= 1924 Auckland Rugby League season =

The 1924 season of Auckland Rugby League was its 15th. Marist won the first grade championship for the first time in their history after defeating Devonport in the final by 20 points to 17 in front of a club record crowd of 17,000 at Carlaw Park. While City won the Roope Rooster competition for the 4th time.

Preceded by 1923	16th Auckland Rugby League season 1924	Succeeded by 1925

== News ==
Leys Institute were a 6th grade side and were affiliated with the Ponsonby club.

Team	1st Grade	2nd Grade	3rd Grade	4th Grade	5th Grade	6th Grade A	6th Grade B	Total
Ponsonby United	1	1	1	2	1	1	0	7
Richmond Rovers	1	1	1	1	1	1	1	7
City Rovers	1	1	1	1	0	2	1	7
Manukau Rovers	0	1	1	1	1	1	1	6
Newton Rangers	1	1	0	1	1	1	0	5
Marist Old Boys	1	1	0	1	0	1	1	5
Athletic	1	0	1	0	1	1	1	5
Ellerslie United	1	1	0	1	1	0	1	5
Māngere United	1	1	1	1	0	0	0	4
Devonport United	1	1	1	1	0	0	0	4
Parnell	0	0	1	1	0	1	1	4
Otahuhu Rovers	0	1	1	0	1	0	0	3
United Suburbs	0	1	1	1	0	0	0	3
Kingsland Rovers	0	1	1	0	0	0	0	2
New Lynn	0	0	1	0	1	0	0	2
Point Chevalier	0	0	1	0	1	0	0	2
Takapuna	0	0	0	1	0	0	0	1
Coromandel Old Boys	0	0	1	0	0	0	0	1
Northcote & Birkenhead Ramblers	0	0	0	0	1	0	0	1
Leys Institute (Ponsonby)	0	0	0	0	0	1	0	1
Total	9	12	14	13	10	10	7	75

=== First grade competition ===
At a Management Committee meeting on 9 April, the Mangere United team, and Ellerslie clubs who had requested to enter senior teams in the First Grade competition were accepted, bringing the total number of teams to nine. The Mangere team registered its colours and green and black. The suggested format was one where after the first round the top six teams would continue while the bottom three teams would have other matches arranged for them. However all nine teams remained in the grade until the end of the season. The Mangere United team was a combined team from the Manukau and Mangere clubs. Both clubs retained their own identity in the junior grades.

On the opening day of the season all four First Grade matches were played on Carlaw Park. The junior matches on the same day were postponed as the railway workers were on strike and there was no way for the players to reach the outer suburban grounds which were used for matches in these grades.

=== Lou Brown transfer issue ===
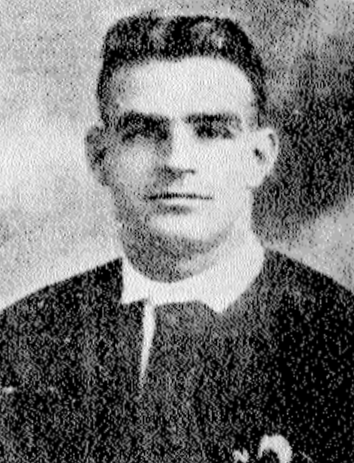
Lou Brown

Lou Brown, the New Zealand international had played for Newton Rangers in 1922 and 1923 however at the end of the season he moved to England to play for Wigan. He had been granted a release by Newton and New Zealand Rugby League. Upon his return he wished to play for the City Rovers club and he turned out for them despite being told by the Auckland Rugby League that he was not eligible to play for them. City were adamant that he had been fully released and could play for any team. The New Zealand Rugby League Council supported the decision but Brown played anyway. He was subsequently suspended for 3 matches. City took the extraordinary step of withdrawing its team from the competition and they defaulted their Round 9 match with Mangere United. On 18 July Newton held a special board meeting and agreed to grant Brown a transfer and thus the issue was finally settled.

=== Manukau Rovers club switches to rugby union ===
The entire Manukau Rovers club switched to rugby union after a dispute with Auckland Rugby League. The issue arose after one of their players (King) was suspended for four playing Saturdays. He had been suspended because he was registered with the Manukau club but "suddenly joined, or played, for the Māngere United team without having been granted a transfer". An opposing team had protested and King had in the meantime moved back to the Manukau club. The Manukau club took exception to the decision and refused to play any of its six teams in the following grades: Second, Third, Fourth, Fifth, Sixth A, and Sixth B. It then went a step further by switching the entire club to rugby union with the Auckland Rugby Union accepting them. The Secretary of the club, C.J, Williams disputed the way the ARL had handled the matter and several of the facts in a letter to the Auckland Star. The ARL Chairman, Mr. W. Hammill replied to the letter "that the matters contained therein were hardly correct".

=== United Suburbs club formation ===
At the Auckland Rugby League meeting of April 2 the affiliation of the United Suburbs club was approved. Their club colours were gold with a black badge. Two weeks later at the management committee meeting their colours were registered however they were now maroon and gold.

=== New Lynn club formation ===
A club was also formed at New Lynn in early March. They only lasted until around 1930 however and are not the present day New Lynn Stags club. They played around the Kelston area opposite the present day Kelston Shopping Centre, possibly at the site of present day Kelston Girls College. At their formation meeting the Auckland chairman, Mr. W.J. Hammill was present along with A. Powell from the New Zealand Council (rugby league). The following officers were elected:- Patron, hon. Christopher James Parr; vice patron, Mr. Albert Crum, senr.; president, Mr. C.F. Gardiner; secretary and delegate to the league, Mr. Colin Crum; treasurer, Mr. Mathieson; auditor, Mr. Ivan Culpan; management committee, Messrs. T. Brown and R. Brown, in addition to the chairman, secretary and treasurer. They decided to enter three teams in junior grades though ultimately fielded 2 sides in the 3rd and 5th grades. The Tahurangi/Crum Park in nearby Titirangi is named after Albert Crum who was a well known figure in the New Lynn pottery industry.

=== Goals from marks ===
At the ARL Management Committee meeting on 13 August, the Referee's Association reported that goals from marks would no longer be permitted. This rule would come into place from Saturday, 23 August onwards.

== Monteith Shield (1st grade championship) ==
A record nine teams competed in the First Grade competition in 1924 with the addition of the Māngere United and Ellerslie senior teams. Mangere had their colours registered as green and black. It was initially decided that after the first round the bottom three teams would drop out of the competition for the second round. At the end of the first round these teams were Māngere United, and Ellerslie. However, this was later rescinded and all teams remained in the competition until the end of the season.

=== Monteith Shield standings ===
Team	Pld	W	D	L	F	A	Pts
Marist Old Boys	15	11	1	3	345	147	23
Devonport United	16	11	1	4	272	191	23
City Rovers	15	8	3	4	201	107	19
Athletic	15	8	2	5	257	206	18
Ponsonby United	15	8	0	7	188	144	16
Māngere United	14	5	0	9	154	252	10
Richmond Rovers	16	5	0	11	97	194	10
Newton Rangers	15	5	0	10	133	250	10
Ellerslie	15	3	1	11	95	210	7

=== Monteith Shield fixtures ===
==== Round 1 ====
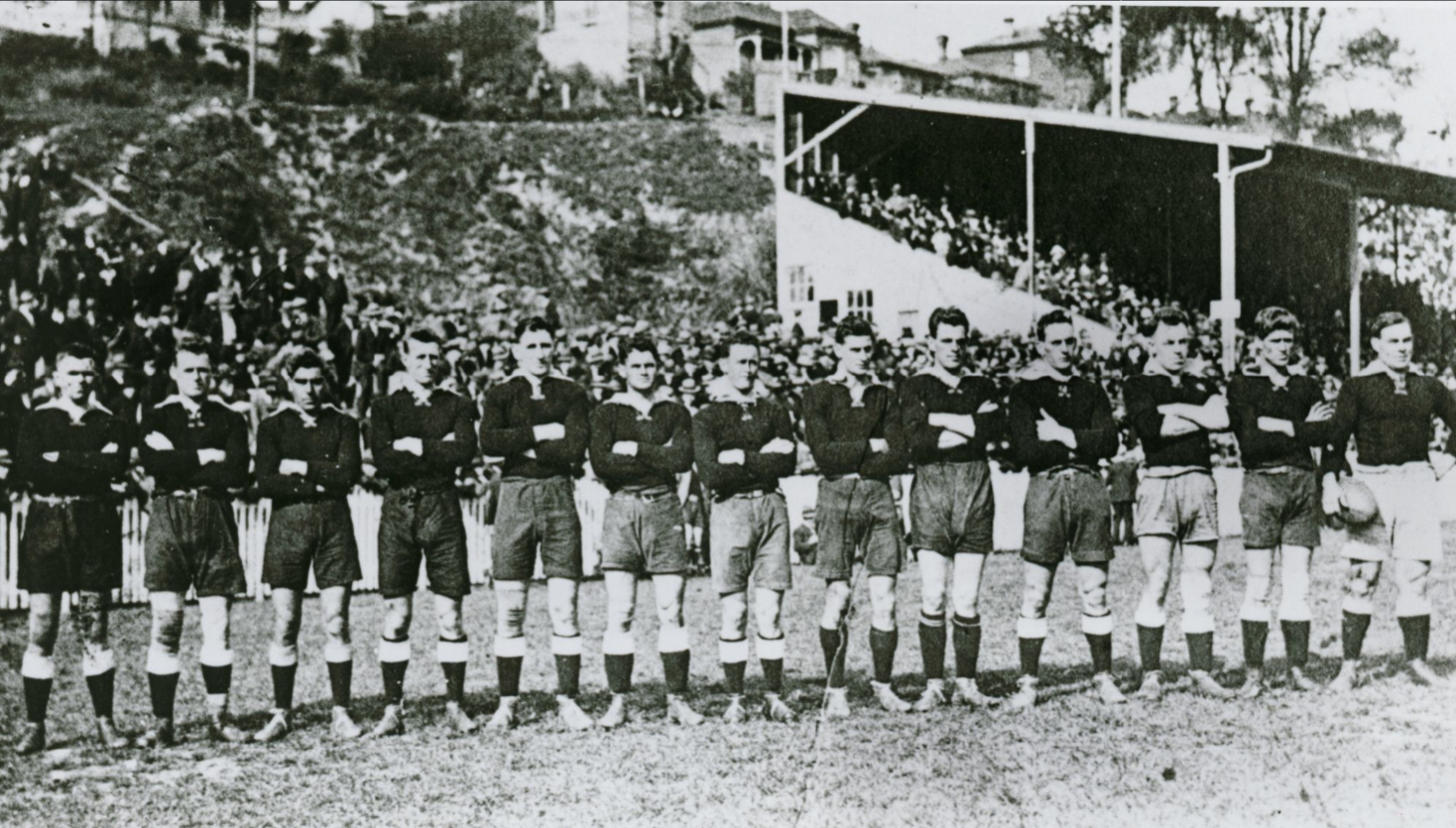
The North Shore senior side photographed in front of the main stand during the season. Captain, Bert Laing is holding the ball.

26 April	Ponsonby	24–5	Māngere	Carlaw Park 1
1:30	Try: Cooke, Moore, J Shirley, Mormon, Wilfred McNeil, Ivan Littlewood; Con: Frank Delgrosso 2 Pen: Frank Delgrosso		Try: Lipscombe; Pen: Jack Pai	Attendance: 4,500; Referee: Bert Gallagher

26 April	City	17–2	Newton	Carlaw Park 1
3:15	Try: Vic Thomas, C Mitchell, George Davidson, Ben Davidson 2 Con: Mike Flynn		Pen: Alan Clarke	Attendance: 4,500; Referee: Les Bull

26 April	Athletic	6–2	Richmond	Carlaw Park 2
3:15	Try: Wilson Hall, Austin		Pen: Trevor Hanlon	Attendance: 4,500; Referee: Walter Ripley

26 April	Marist	10–7	Ellerslie	Carlaw Park 2
1:30	Try: Sweeney, Edmund Carroll; Con: John Lang; Pen: John Lang		Try: Bryan; Pen: Peebles; Drop: Peebles	Attendance: 4,500; Referee: T Hill

==== Round 2 ====
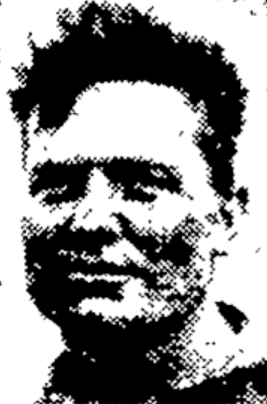
Andrew (Jim) O'Brien

Jim O'Brien debuted for Marist. He had previously played for the New Zealand national rugby team in 3 matches in 1922. Baden Foss went off with an injury to his nose and a cut eye and was replaced by Jim Stormont, with his brother Bill Stormont moving into Foss's position in the backline. Jim Rukutai made his first appearance in a jersey for two years when he played for Mangere, who he was coaching. He had only played a handful of times since 1919 and was aged about 45. Despite his age he played well, scoring two of their three tries.

3 May	City	20–2	Marist	Carlaw Park 1
3:00	Try: Maurice Wetherill, George Davidson, Hec McDonald, Ben Davidson; Con: Mike Flynn, Selby Crewther; Pen: Arthur Sutton; Drop: Ben Davidson		Pen: Jim O'Brien (1 mark)	Attendance: 6,000; Referee: Walter Ripley

3 May	Ponsonby	18–3	Newton	Carlaw Park 2
3:00	Try: Hector Cole, Frank Delgrosso, Ivan Littlewood, Dooley Moore; Con: Frank Delgrosso 3		Try: Wally Somers	Attendance: 6,000; Referee: A Saunders

3 May	Devonport	26–16	Ellerslie	Devonport Domain
3:00	Try: Alf Harper, Norman Veart 2, Norton, Harry Douglas, Alex Godick (obstruction try); Con: Alf Harper 2, Neville St George, Alex Godick		Try: Baker 2, Peebles, G Slater; Con: Brien; Pen: H Wynn	Referee: Bert Gallagher

3 May	Richmond	16–11	Mangere	Auckland Domain
3:00	Try: Parkes 2, Campney, McMillan; Con: McDonald; Pen: Avery		Try: M Paul, Jim Rukutai 2 Con: Lou Wilson jun.	Referee: Billy Murray

==== Round 3 ====
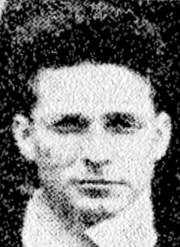
Charles Gregory

In the match at Devonport Domain between Devonport and City, Ben Davidson the City centre three quarter, was knocked unconscious and had to be taken to hospital. It was reported days later that his condition was not reported as serious. City had a bye the following weekend and he returned to play in Round 5. Neville St George and Alf Townsend were ordered off in the same match. They were the two hookers and there had been issues with the scrum with referee Les Bull having enough and giving them their marching orders. Stan Webb and Bert Laing both made their first appearances of the year for Devonport. Charles Gregory debuted for Marist at fullback and played a good game, converting both of their tries. He had played 12 games for Auckland rugby union team in 1922 and 1923 before switching codes, though he had played some rugby league before that. Gregory would go on to play over 80 games for Marist becoming one of their all time leading scorers and represented New Zealand on 40 occasions.

10 May	Marist	10–3	Ponsonby	Carlaw Park 1
3:00	Try: Bernard Sweeney 2 Con: Charles Gregory 2		Try: R Cook	Attendance: 3,000; Referee: Billy Murray

10 May	Richmond	6–0	Newton	Carlaw Park 2
3:00	Try: Unknown, Jack Campney			Attendance: 3,000; Referee: McCowatt

10 May	Athletic	14–6	Mangere	Victoria Park
3:00	Try: George Yardley 2, Young, Graham; Con: Craddock Dufty		Try: Jim Rukutai, M Paul	Referee: Bert Gallagher

10 May	Devonport	2–2	City	Devonport Domain
3:00	Pen: Bert Laing		Drop: Vic Thomas	Referee: Les Bull

==== Round 4 ====
Two matches were postponed in Round 4 as the league decided that they wanted the #1 field in the best possible condition for the exhibition match between City Rovers and Marist Old Boys of Christchurch. The weather had been particularly poor in the lead up with the previous weekend seeing all football in Auckland cancelled. These postponed matches were unique in that they were eventually played 10 days later on a Tuesday morning at 9.30am. This would surely be one of the only times a senior match had been played on a working weekday morning in the competitions history. In Richmond's game at Devonport Domain, their centre Jack Campney broke his rib in the first half and a local doctor sent him to hospital for treatment.

24 May	Mangere	35–10	Newton	Carlaw Park 2
3:00	Try: Lou Wilson jun. 3, Jack Pai, Jim Rukutai, P Tutaki 2, M Paul 2 Con: Lou Wilson jun. 2, L Moyle, M Paul		Try: Lindsay, Wally Somers; Con: Clarrie Polson 2	Referee: William Mincham

24 May	Devonport	13–7	Richmond	Devonport Domain
3:00	Try: G Smith, Stan Webb, Harry Douglas; Con: Bert Laing; Pen: Bert Laing		Try: Ray Hyland; Pen: McDonald 2	Referee: Walter Ripley

24 May	Marist	PPD	Athletic	Carlaw Park 1
1:45				Referee: Leonard Neild

24 May	Ponsonby	PPD	Ellerslie	Carlaw Park 2
1:45				Referee: Bert Gallagher

==== Round 5 ====
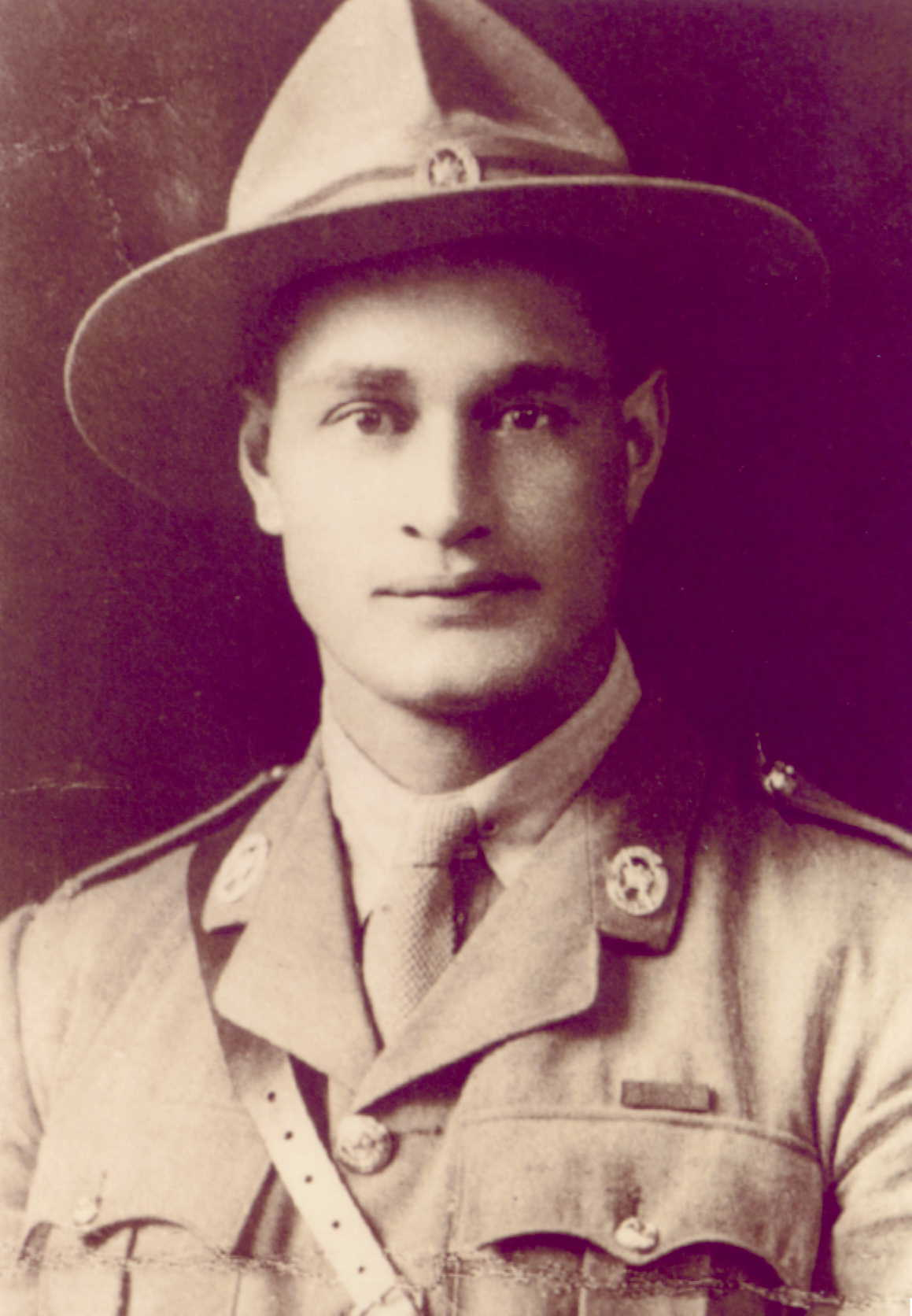
George Gardiner

George Gardiner debuted for Marist. He had played rugby union for the Māori Pioneer Battalion side in 1918-19 and for the Bay of Plenty rugby team. In rugby league he went on to represent Auckland 4 times and New Zealand 21 times on their 1926 tour of England. In the early 1930s he moved to Australia to emabark on a professional wrestling career. After the outbreak of World War 2 he enlisted but was killed fighting in Libya.

31 May	Devonport	6–0	Ponsonby	Carlaw Park 1
3:00	Try: Bert Laing, Alf Scott			Attendance: 3,000; Referee: Bert Gallagher

31 May	Marist	26–2	Richmond	Carlaw Park 2
3:00	Try: Jim O’Brien 2, W Kirkland 2, Bill Stormont, John Lang; Con: Jim O'Brien, Charles Gregory 2, W Kirkland		Pen: Butler	Attendance: 3,000; Referee: Leonard Nield

31 May	Athletic	33–23	Newton	Victoria Park 1
3:00	Try: Austin 2, Craddock Dufty 2, Wilson Hall 2, Woolley; Con: Craddock Dufty 6		Try: R Callaghan, Clarrie Polson, J Biggs, Robert Stack, John Wareing; Con: Clarrie Polson 2, John Wareing 2	Referee: T Hill

31 May	City	32–0	Ellerslie	Auckland Domain 3
3:00	Try: Ben Davidson, Nelson Bass, Selby Crewther 2, Alf Townsend, Maurice Wetherill 2, George Davidson; Con: Selby Crewther 3, Alf Townsend			Referee: McCowatt

==== Round 4 postponed matches ====
The postponed games were played on the Tuesday morning of King's Birthday and given the 9:30am start time and other attractions drew a decent crowd of 2,000.

3 June	Marist	8–8	Athletic	Carlaw Park 1
9:30	Try: Bernard Sweeney, Hec Brisbane; Con: Charles Gregory		Try: Woolley, Ernie Herring; Con: Wilson Hall	Attendance: 2,000; Referee: A Saunders

3 June	Ellerslie	6–5	Ponsonby	Carlaw Park 2
9:30	Try: Brien, Murray		Try: John Shirley; Con: John Shirley	Attendance: 2,000; Referee: Taylor

==== Round 6 ====
The match played at Ellerslie Reserve between Richmond and Ellerslie was the first senior match played there since 1912.

21 June	Devonport	16–15	Athletic	Carlaw Park 1
2:45	Try: Bert Laing, Jim O'Brien, Stan Webb, Norman Veart; Con: Bert Laing, Alf Scott		Try: Craddock Dufty, Bert Avery (obstruction try), Graham; Con: Craddock Dufty 3	Referee: A Saunders

21 June	Ponsonby	14–2	City	Carlaw Park 2
2:45	Try: Frank Delgrosso, H Godley; Con: Frank Delgrosso 2 Pen: Frank Delgrosso 2		Drop: Nelson Bass	Referee: Les Bull

21 June	Marist	44–3	Mangere	Victoria Park
3:00	Try: Jim O'Brien 2, Bernard Sweeney, Mick Sherlock, George Gardiner, Jim Stormont, Hec Brisbane, John Lang 2, B Keary; Con: Jim O'Brien, George Gardiner 3, Hec Brisbane, John Lang; Pen: George Gardiner		Try: Arthur Ansell

21 June	Richmond	5–0	Ellerslie	Ellerslie Reserve
3:00	Try: Unknown x 1 Con: Unknown x 1

==== Round 7 ====
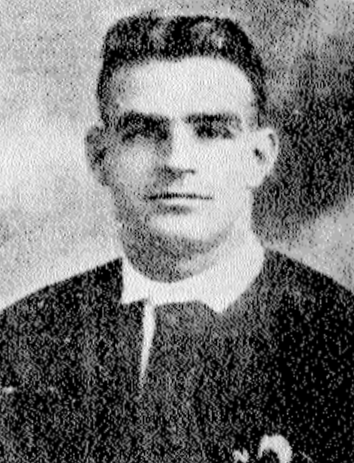
Lou Brown

Referee Bill Murray was refereeing his 50th first grade match in the clash between Devonport and Mangere at the Devonport Domain. He became only the second referee to achieve this feat after Archie Ferguson 2 years earlier. There was controversy in the match between City Rovers and Richmond as the City team fielded Lou Brown who had not been granted clearance by either Auckland Rugby League or New Zealand Rugby League. Brown had previously played for Newton and had been released to play for Wigan in England. After returning he wanted to turn out for the City club but Newton claimed that he had been released on the grounds that he would return to play for them alone. Brown was later suspended for 3 matches before rejoining the Newton team for their match against Marist. The match between Marist and Newton at the Auckland Domain was played in a "sea of mud" and within a few minutes Newton halfback Clarrie Polson after he received a bad kick and had to go off. George Gardiner had a big game scoring 3 tries and converting 4 tries. Bill Te Whata played his first game of rugby league for two seasons when he turned out for Athletic in their 14-5 win over Ellerslie. He had tried several times to be reinstated into rugby union with the case being controversial as the New Zealand Rugby Union contended that he had been paid to play, however it was later clarified that the money he received was from the New South Wales rugby league, not the New Zealand Rugby League. A month later he debuted for New Zealand in their series with England.

28 June	City	32–7	Richmond	Carlaw Park 1
2:45	Try: Lou Brown 3, Selby Crewther, Harry Hawkes 2, George Cargill, Ben Davidson; Con: Selby Crewther 4		Try: Whittington; Pen: Butler 2	Referee: Robert A Bovaird

28 June	Athletic	14–5	Ellerslie	Carlaw Park 2
2:45	Try: Jack McGregor 2, Woolley, Joe Hadley; Con: George Yardley		Try: Andrews; Con: Hettet	Referee: Percy Rogers

28 June	Marist	41–3	Newton	Auckland Domain 1
2:45	Try: W Kirkland 2, Hec Brisbane 2, George Gardiner 3, Jim Stormont, Baden Foss, Mick Sherlock, Jim O'Brien; Con: George Gardiner 4		Try: Dick Stack	Referee: T Hill

28 June	Devonport	24–3	Mangere	Devonport Domain
2:45	Try: Charles Hand, Alex Godick, Harry Douglas 2, Bert Laing, Norman Veart; Con: Julius Laing, Alf Scott; Pen: Julius Laing		Try: M Paul	Referee: Billy Murray

==== Round 8 ====
The match between Māngere and Ellerslie was the first ever rugby league match played at present day Ferguson Park in Onehunga.

5 July	Athletic	6–6	City	Carlaw Park 1
2:45	Try: Bill Te Whata, George Yardley		Try: Ben Davidson 2	Referee: Billy Murray

5 July	Ponsonby	11–6	Richmond	Carlaw Park 2
2:45	Try: Ward, Ivan Littlewood, J Shirley; Pen: Frank Delgrosso		Try: Butler, Redwood	Referee: Les Bull

5 July	Mangere	18–10	Ellerslie	Manukau 3 (Ferguson Park, Onehunga)
2:45	Try: Unknown 18 points		Try: Unknown 10 points	Referee: Walter Ripley

5 July	Devonport	WBD–LBD	Newton	Devonport Domain
3:00				Referee: Leonard Nield

==== Round 9 ====
City defaulted their match against Mangere United in protest at the decision to not allow Lou Brown to register for the club after returning from England.

12 July	Marist	37–0	Devonport	Carlaw Park 1
2:45	Try: John Lang, George Gardiner, Baden Foss, Bernard Sweeney, Hec Brisbane 2, John Stormont; Con: George Gardiner 6 Pen: John Lang; Drop: Baden Foss			Attendance: 10,000; Referee: Leonard Nield

12 July	Ponsonby	15–9	Athletic	Carlaw Park 2
2:45	Try: Thomas McClymont, Len Ward, George Mormon; Con: Frank Delgrosso; Pen: Frank Delgrosso 2		Try: George Yardley, Bert Avery, Len Mason	Attendance: 10,000; Referee: Wally Ripley

12 July	Mangere	WBD–LBD	City	Victoria Park 1
3:00				Referee: McCowatt

12 July	Newton	11-5	Ellerslie	Victoria Park 2
3:00	Try: Unknown 11 points		Try: Unknown 5 points	Referee: W Hill

==== Round 10 ====
In the Athletic match with Richmond, Graham was ordered off for Athletic as was McMillan for Richmond. Richmond had lost William Whittington to a fractured right leg early in the second half and with the score 25–0 with 6 minutes to go they asked for the game to end and their opponents and the referee obliged. Aside from the score there was no individual scoring reported from the Ellerslie v Mangere game from the Ellerslie Reserve.

19 July	Marist	13–2	City	Carlaw Park 1
2:45	Try: John Lang, Hec Brisbane, Bernard Sweeney; Con: George Gardiner 2		Pen: Selby Crewther	Attendance: 7,000; Referee: Les Bull

19 July	Athletic	25–0	Richmond	Carlaw Park 2
2:45	Try: Joe Hadley 2, Len Mason 2, Craddock Dufty, Bill Te Whata, Bert Avery; Con: Len Mason 2			Attendance: 7,000; Referee: Percy Rogers

19 July	Devonport	3–6	Ponsonby	Devonport Domain
3:00	Try: Monteith		Try: Frank Delgrosso, Thomas McClymont	Referee: Billy Murray

19 July	Ellerslie	8-19	Mangere	Ellerslie Reserve
3:00				Referee: Leonard Nield

==== Round 11 ====
The round 11 was perhaps the only year in all of Auckland Rugby League from 1909 to 1945 where every single senior team lineup was published in the match day reports. Twin brothers Lou Ernest Brown and Roy (Ernest) Brown played together in the City senior side for the first time. Lou typically played on the wing with Ernest at fullback over the following 2 seasons.

9 August	Ponsonby	17–4	Richmond	Carlaw Park 1
3:00	Try: A Watson 2, Joseph Peckham, H Goodley, Eric Grey; Con: Ivan Littlewood		Pen: McDonald 2	Referee: Les Bull

9 August	City	35–10	Athletic	Carlaw Park 2
3:00	Try: George Davidson, Selby Crewther, George Cargill, Nelson Bass 2, Lou Brown 3, Ernie Mackie; Con: George Davidson, Selby Crewther 3		Try: Seagar, John McGregor; Con: Seagar; Pen: Seagar	Referee: A Saunders

9 August	Devonport	21–6	Ellerslie	Victoria Park 1
3:00	Try: Alf Harper 3, Walter Voysey, Stan Webb; Con: Alf Scott 3		Pen: Peebles, John Shand 2	Referee: H C Taylor

9 August	Newton	12–11	Mangere	Victoria Park 2
3:00	Try: Frank Moran, Jack Keenan; Con: Arthur Mansill; Pen: Arthur Mansill 2		Try: Tommy Pai, Lou Wilson jr., Jim Rukutai; Con: Tommy Pai	Referee: R McCowatt

==== Round 12 ====
16 August	Ponsonby	25–10	City	Carlaw Park 1
3:00	Try: George Mormon, Ivan Littlewood 2, Donovan, Joseph Peckham; Con: Frank Delgrosso 2, Ivan Littlewood; Pen: Frank Delgrosso 2		Try: Nelson Bass, George Cargill; Con: George Davidson; Pen: George Davidson	Attendance: 4,500; Referee: Billy Murray

16 August	Athletic	23–16	Marist	Carlaw Park 2
3:00	Try: Joe Hadley 2, Craddock Dufty, George Yardley, John McGregor; Con: Craddock Dufty 3 Pen: Craddock Dufty		Try: Jim Johnson, Bernard Sweeney, John Stormont, Short; Con: George Gardiner 2	Attendance: 4,500; Referee: Wally Ripley

16 August	Richmond	10–3	Ellerslie	Victoria Park
3:00	Try: J Swift, Jack Campney; Con: McDonald; Pen: McDonald		Try: Harrison	Referee: William Mincham

16 August	Devonport	27-9	Newton	Victoria Park
3:00	Try: Alf Scott 2, Julius Laing, Stanley Butland, Alf Harper, G Smith, Charles Hand; Con: Proctor, Unknown x 1 Pen: Tommy Taylor		Try: Moran; Con: Arthur Mansill; Pen: Arthur Mansill 2	Referee: Robert A Bovaird

==== Round 13 ====
23 August	Marist	16–10	Ponsonby	Carlaw Park 1
3:00	Try: George Gardiner 2, Bernard Sweeney, W Kirkland; Con: George Gardiner 2		Try: Frank Delgrosso, Wilfred McNeil; Con: Frank Delgrosso; Pen: Frank Delgrosso	Attendance: 9,000; Referee: Les Bull

23 August	Newton	11–5	Richmond	Carlaw Park 2
3:00	Try: Arthur Mansill, Clarrie Polson, M Brown; Con: Arthur Mansill		Try: Ray Hyland; Con: McDonald	Attendance: 9,000; Referee: Hill

23 August	Devonport	32–13	Mangere	Victoria Park 1
3:00	Try: Alf Harper, Alf Scott, Tommy Taylor, Proctor, L Voysey, Bert Laing; Con: Alf Scott 3, Neville St George, Bert Laing, Charles Hand; Pen: John Laing		Try: M Paul, J Pai, Lou Wilson jun. Con: M Paul, Arthur Ansell	Referee: Percy Addleburt Lupton

23 August	Ellerslie	10–10	City	Ellerslie Reserve
3:00	Try: J Crotty, G Slater; Con: Peebles, J Shand		Try: Ernest Ruby 2 Con: George Davidson 2	Referee: McCowatt

==== Round 14 ====
Craddock Dufty converted 6 of Athletic's 8 tries on his way to the leading scorer title for the year.

30 August	Athletic	36–21	Ponsonby	Carlaw Park 1
3:00	Try: Joe Hadley 2, Graham, Jack McGregor, Woods, Bert Avery 3 Con: Craddock Dufty 6		Try: A Snedden 2, Joseph Peckham, Ivan Littlewood, John Shirley; Con: Frank Delgrosso 2 Pen: Frank Delgrosso	Referee: William Mincham

30 August	Marist	19–2	Ellerslie	Carlaw Park 2
3:00	Try: Reg Malloy 2, Jim O'Brien, Billy Ghent, MacDonald; Con: Bill Stormont; Pen: Bill Stormont		Pen: John Shand	Referee: Wally Ripley

30 August	Māngere	5–10	Richmond	Māngere 3 (Ferguson Park, Onehunga)
3:00	Try: M Paul; Con: M Paul		Try: Jack Campney 2 Con: Trevor Hanlon 2	Referee: Leonard Nield

30 August	City	16–3	Newton	Victoria Park
3:00	Try: R Purdy, Thorburn, Lou Brown, Ben Davidson; Con: Lou Brown; Drop: Ben Davidson		Try: Arthur Mansill	Referee: A Saunders

==== Round 15 ====
The win by City over Devonport was a competition milestone as it was City's 100th win in First Grade. They were the first club to achieve this milestone and did so in their 15th season and 149th game.

6 September	City	17–13	Devonport	Carlaw Park 1
3:00	Try: C Mitchell, George Davidson, Harry Hawkes; Con: George Davidson 3 Pen: W Sandham		Try: Alf Harper, Walter Voysey, Norman Veart; Pen: Bert Laing 2	Attendance: 7,000; Referee: Leonard Nield

6 September	Newton	26–18	Athletic	Carlaw Park 2
3:00	Try: Watson, Alan Clarke, Thompson, Arthur Mansill 2, R Callaghan; Con: Alan Clarke, Thompson, Arthur Mansill 2		Try: Joe Hadley 2, Craddock Dufty, C Timmins; Con: Craddock Dufty 2 Pen: Craddock Dufty	Attendance: 7,000; Referee: Robert A Bovaird

6 September	Māngere	5–29	Marist	(Ferguson Park, Onehunga)
3:00	Try: Daniels; Pen: Wilson		Try: Jim Stormont 3, W Kirkland, Jim Johnson, Lyall Stewart 2 Con: Bill Stormont, Jim O'Brien, Charles Gregory; Pen: Bill Stormont	Referee: Percy Rogers

6 September	Ellerslie	11–7	Ponsonby	Ellerslie Reserve
3:00	Try: A Dance, Peebles, Brien; Con: J Shand		Try: George Mormon; Pen: Frank Delgrosso 2	Referee: Les Bull

==== Round 16 ====
Near full-time in the match between Marist and Devonport, Kiwi international Bill Stormont was ordered off. In the Newton match with Ponsonby a very unusual incident took place. L Williams for the Newton team was dribbling the ball down field and when he kicked ahead to chase, the ball went over the cross bar. He ran through to 'score the try' but the referee awarded a drop goal rather than a try. M Paul for Mangere scored on the stroke of full time in the corner to hand them the win 20-19 over Athletic. Richmond defaulted their first ever 1st grade match after a number of the players were reportedly injured or suffering from influenza.

13 September	Devonport	25–19	Marist	Carlaw Park 1
3:00	Try: Walter Voysey, Harry Douglas 2, Norman Veart, Alf Scott (obstruction try); Con: Bert Laing 2, Alf Scott 2 Pen: Bert Laing		Try: Lyall Stewart, George Gardiner, Bernard Sweeney, Reg Malloy, Billy Ghent; Con: George Gardiner 2	Attendance: 7,000; Referee: Wally Ripley

13 September	Mangere	20–19	Athletic	Carlaw Park 2
1:15	Try: Lou Wilson jun. 2, Jack Pai, Rau, M Paul 2 Pen: Norman Lipscombe		Try: Joe Hadley, Craddock Dufty, Jack McGregor, Draffin, Winkie; Con: Craddock Dufty 2	Attendance: 7,000; Referee: Billy Murray

13 September	Newton	17–12	Ponsonby	Carlaw Park 1
2:00	Try: Watson 2, Clarrie Polson, Con: Arthur Mansill 2 Pen: Arthur Mansill; Drop: L Williams		Try: Henderson, John Shirley; Con: Eric Grey 2 Pen: Eric Grey	Attendance: 7,000; Referee: Hill

13 September	City	WBD – LBD	Richmond	Carlaw Park 2
1:15				Referee: A Saunders

==== Round 17 ====
It is unlikely that the Māngere v Ponsonby match took place as the Auckland representative team was playing a match against the South Auckland team in Hamilton at the same time. Many of the selected players chose to stay and play for their Auckland club teams in important matches. The team that did end up playing in the representative match featured seven players from the Ponsonby and Māngere teams and there were no reports of a match between the two sides in any newspaper. A table published at the end of the season also only credited Māngere with 14 matches, not 15 which is what they would have played had the match taken place.

20 September	Devonport	47–21	Athletic	Carlaw Park 1
3:00	Try: Allan Seagar 3, Harry Douglas, Bert Laing, Walter Voysey 3, G Smith, Stan Webb, Alf Harper; Con: Bert Laing 2, Alf Scott 3, Stan Webb, Julius Laing		Try: Craddock Dufty 2, Weeks, C Timmins, Jack McGregor; Con: Craddock Dufty 2 Pen: Craddock Dufty	Referee: Les Bull

20 September	Marist	34–17	Richmond	Carlaw Park 2
3:00	Try: Jim Johnson 2, W Kirkland, John Stormont, George Gardiner, Reg Malloy, Bernard Sweeney, Edmund Carroll; Con: Charles Gregory 5		Try: Ken Hyland 2, Trevor Hanlon; Con: Trevor Hanlon 3 Pen: Trevor Hanlon	Referee: Billy Mincham

20 September	Ellerslie	6–3	Newton	Ellerslie Reserve
2:00	Try: Brien, J Shand		Try: Thompson	Referee: Hill

20 September	Mangere	cancelled	Ponsonby	Manukau
3:00				Referee: Alfred James Coulam

==== Final ====
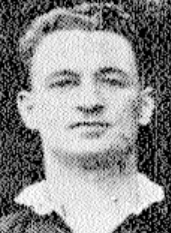
Jack Kirwan

Jack Kirwan debuted for Marist in the final. It was slightly controversial that a team in a significant match had signed and registered players midweek to play though not unprecedented. Many teams would debut prospective players later in the season and in particular they would trial (disgruntled) rugby players. Kirwan would go on to represent New Zealand and later serve on the Marist committee for many years. He scored a try in their narrow in, with Charles Gregory kicking 4 goals. For the losers Bert Laing scored a try and kicked 2 goals. Jack Kirwan's grandson John Kirwan played for the All Blacks in the 1980s and 90s.

27 September	Marist	20–17	Devonport	Carlaw Park 1
3:00	Try: John Stormont, Jack Kirwan, Billy Ghent, Reg Malloy; Con: Charles Gregory 3 Pen: Charles Gregory		Try: Bert Laing, Alf Harper, Harry Douglas; Con: Bert Laing, Alf Scott; Pen: Bert Laing 2	Attendance: 17,000; Referee: Bill Murray

== Roope Rooster knockout competition ==
City Rovers won the Roope Rooster for the 4th time in their history, defeating Ponsonby who were attempting to win their third consecutive title, in the final by 6 points to 5.

=== Round 1 ===
27 September	Richmond	11–7	Ellerslie	Carlaw Park 2
3:00	Try: Hunt, Echrafft, Ray Hyland; Con: Trevor Hanlon		Try: Clarke; Con: John Shand; Drop: John Shand	Referee: Les Bull

=== Round 2 ===
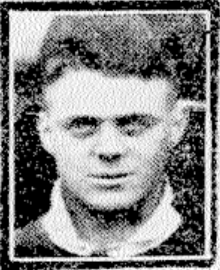
Roy Hardgrave

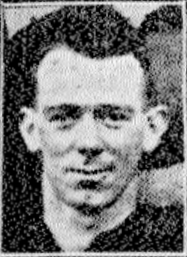
Frederick Bass (Richmond)

Roy Hardgrave debuted for Newton. He went on to play 58 games for them, scoring 39 tries and kicking 6 goals before signing for St Helens R.F.C. in 1929. For St Helens he played 212 times and scored 173 tries. In 1934 he returned to Newton playing twice before joining Mt Albert for 2 matches. He then went back to England and played 89 games for York scoring 52 tries, and then joined Toulouse in France before once again returning to New Zealand. He then rejoined the Mt Albert side playing 22 games and scoring 1 try before retiring. He later coached Newton Rangers from 1941 to 1943. Frederick Bass debuted for Richmond and went on to play five seasons for them.

4 October	Devonport	5–3	Marist	Carlaw Park 1
3:00	Try: Alf Harper; Pen: Bert Laing		Try: Jim O'Brien	Referee: Les Bull

4 October	City	17–8	Newton	Carlaw Park 2
3:00	Try: Ben Davidson, Ernest Ruby, Harry Hawkes, Lou Brown; Con: Nelson Bass		Try: Roy Hardgrave 2 Con: Arthur Mansill	Referee: McCowatt

4 October	Athletic	21–2	Richmond	Carlaw Park 2
1:45	Try: Joe Hadley, George Yardley, Bert Avery, Charles Webb, Ernie Herring; Con: Craddock Dufty 3		Drop: Sonny Hing	Referee: Saunders

4 October	Ponsonby	24–5	Mangere	Carlaw Park 1
1:45	Try: Leonard Riley 2, Ivan Littlewood, John Shirley, Woodleigh 2 Con: Ivan Littlewood, John Shirley; Drop: Eric Grey		Try: Marshall; Con: Unknown x 1	Referee: Billy Mincham

=== Semi finals ===
11 October	City	29–11	Athletic	Carlaw Park 1
3:00	Try: George Davidson 3, Ernie Mackie, Sandham, Lou Brown 2 Con: Selby Crewther, W Sandham 3		Try: Charles Webb, Ernie Herring, Joe Hadley; Con: Craddock Dufty	Attendance: 6,500; Referee: William Mincham

11 October	Ponsonby	14–10	Devonport	Carlaw Park 2
3:00	Try: Dempsey, D Moore; Con: Frank Delgrosso, Dempsey; Pen: Frank Delgrosso 2		Try: G Smith, Walter Voysey; Con: Bert Laing	Attendance: 6,500; Referee: McCowatt

=== Final ===
18 October	City	6–5	Ponsonby	Carlaw Park 1
3:00	Try: Ernie Mackie, Lou Brown		Try: Bill Walsh; Con: Frank Delgrosso	Attendance: 2,000; Referee: Les Bull

== Top try scorers and point scorers ==
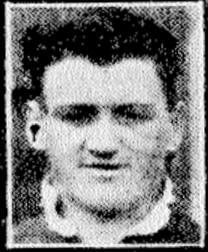
Craddock Dufty

The lists include points scored in the First Grade competition and the Roope Rooster. Joe Hadley of Athletic led the league in tries scored with 12, while Craddock Dufty was once again the top scorer with 91 points from 9 tries, 29 conversions and 3 penalties. Devonport had a try and conversion unattributed in a match. While the match between Mangere United and Ellerslie won by Mangere United 18 to 10 had no points attributed to any player and the round 10 match between the same two teams had no points attributed to either team. It is possible that M Paul for Mangere scored more tries than the 9 he is credited with and more than the 3 goals he kicked.

Top try scorers
Rk	Player	Team	Gms	Tries
1	Joe Hadley	Athletic	12	12
2=	Lou Brown	City	9	11
2=	Bernard Sweeney	Marist	14	11
3	Alf Harper	Devonport	14	10
5=	Ben Davidson	City	12	9
5=	Craddock Dufty	Athletic	15	9
5=	George Gardiner	Marist	11	9
5=	M Paul	Mangere	12	9
8=	Jim Stormont	Marist	15	9
8=	Harry Douglas	Devonport	14	8
8=	J Voysey	Devonport	9	8
8=	George Davidson	City	15	8

Top point scorers
Rk	Player	Team	G	T	C	P	M	Pts
1	Craddock Dufty	Athletic	15	9	28	3	0	89
2	George Gardiner	Marist	11	9	21	1	0	71
3	Frank Delgrosso	Ponsonby	16	4	15	14	0	70
4	Bert Laing	Devonport	14	6	8	8	0	50
5	Alf Scott	Devonport	14	5	14	0	0	43
6	George Davidson	City	15	8	7	1	0	40
7=	Arthur Mansill	Newton	8	4	8	5	0	38
7=	Selby Crewther	City	13	4	12	1	0	38
9	Joe Hadley	Athletic	12	12	0	0	0	36
10	Lou Brown	City	9	11	1	0	0	35

== Exhibition matches ==
City Rovers played Marist of Christchurch at Carlaw Park in May and were victorious by 16 points to 9. At the end of the season Marist, who had won the First Grade Championship met City Rovers, who had won the Roope Rooster and the two teams played out a 10 all draw on Monday morning as part of the Labour Day celebrations to officially finish the season for Auckland Rugby League. On Wednesday the Marist side played Hamilton at Steel Park in Hamilton and won 28 to 3.

=== City v Marist (Christchurch) ===
On the call of time Mike Flynn, the City fullback, and a well known featherweight boxer from Australia broke his left leg at the shin when being tackled by a Marist player. The break was audible to the spectators nearby. He was taken to Auckland Hospital. Flynn had broken his collarbone in a game in 1923. J McCormick, a Marist forward was cut over the eye which required stitches and he was replaced by A Bateman. The match drew 10,000 spectators with the 'home' side winning through a four try effort with forward George Reid getting two of them.

24 May	City	16–9	Marist (Christchurch)	Carlaw Park 1
3:00	Try: Selby Crewther, George Reid 2, Arthur Sutton; Con: Selby Crewther 2		Try: G Batchelor; Con: C Fitzgerald; Pen: C Fitzgerald, E Brosnahan	Attendance: 10,000; Referee: Billy Murray

=== City v Marist ('champion of champions') ===
The winners of the championship (Marist), and the winners of the Roope Rooster (City) met in a special fixture at the end of the season. It was the second year that such a game had been arranged and following the death of Bill Stormont the following year the game became an annual fixture which was played for the Bill Stormont Memorial Shield after it was donated by his family.

27 October	City	10–10	Marist	Carlaw Park 1
3:00	Try: Nelson Bass, Lou Brown; Con: Selby Crewther; Pen: E Brown		Try: Reg Malloy, Jack Kirwan; Con: Charles Gregory; Pen: Charles Gregory	Attendance: 4,000

== Lower grades ==
There were 6 lower grade competitions in 1924 with the 6th grade split into an A and B division.

=== Second grade ===
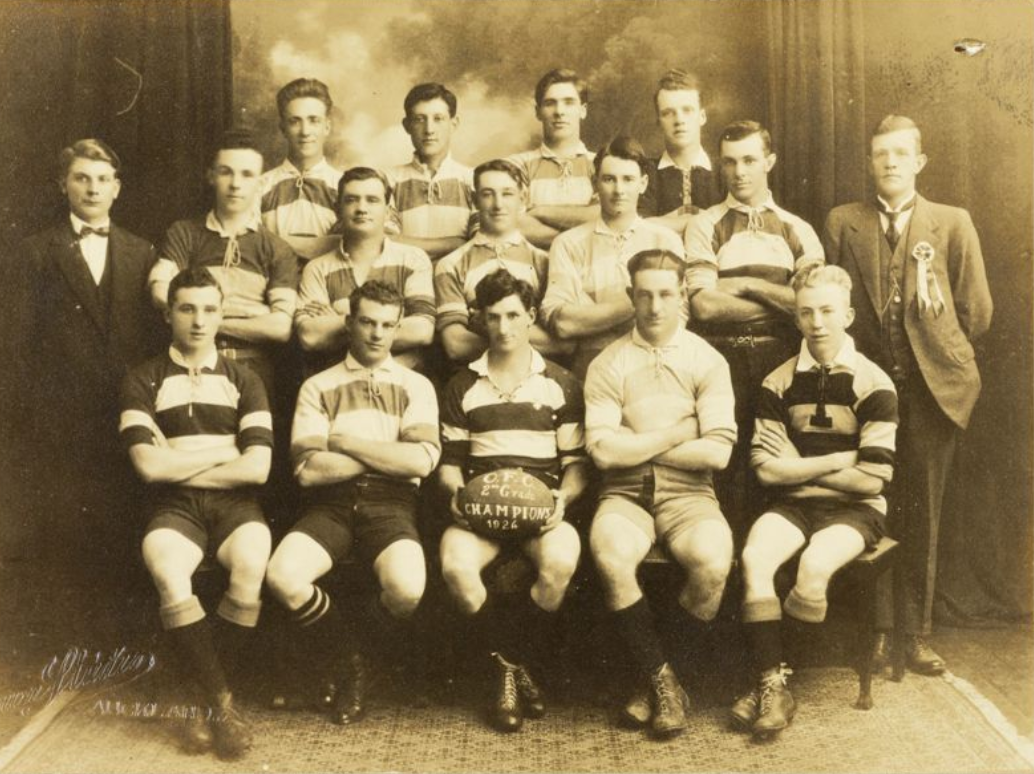
Otahuhu second grade champions.

Otahuhu Rovers won the competition after defeating Richmond Rovers 17-5 on September 6 in the final. Otahuhu had won the A Section and Richmond the B Section. The standings are incomplete with around 18 rounds being played. Athletic withdrew after 3 rounds, Marist and Ellerslie withdrew after 7 rounds, and the Manukau side withdrew when the Manukau board switched to rugby union in protest at a decision by Auckland Rugby League in July. Kingsland won the knockout final when they defeated Otahuhu 6 points to 3 on October 18.

Team	Pld	W	D	L	B	F	A	Pts
Otahuhu Rovers	12	11	0	1	0	214	27	22
Richmond Rovers	8	4	0	4	0	38	79	8
United Suburbs	6	5	0	1	0	62	25	10
Ponsonby United	6	4	0	2	0	91	23	8
Devonport United	4	3	0	1	0	41	15	6
Kingsland Rovers	5	2	0	3	0	52	34	4
City Rovers	6	2	0	4	0	60	53	4
Manukau	2	2	0	0	0	20	0	4
Māngere United	2	0	0	2	0	2	25	0
Newton Rangers	2	0	0	2	0	5	85	0
Ellerslie United	2	0	0	2	0	14	24	0
Marist Old Boys	2	0	0	2	0	0	66	0

=== Third grade (Hayward Shield) ===
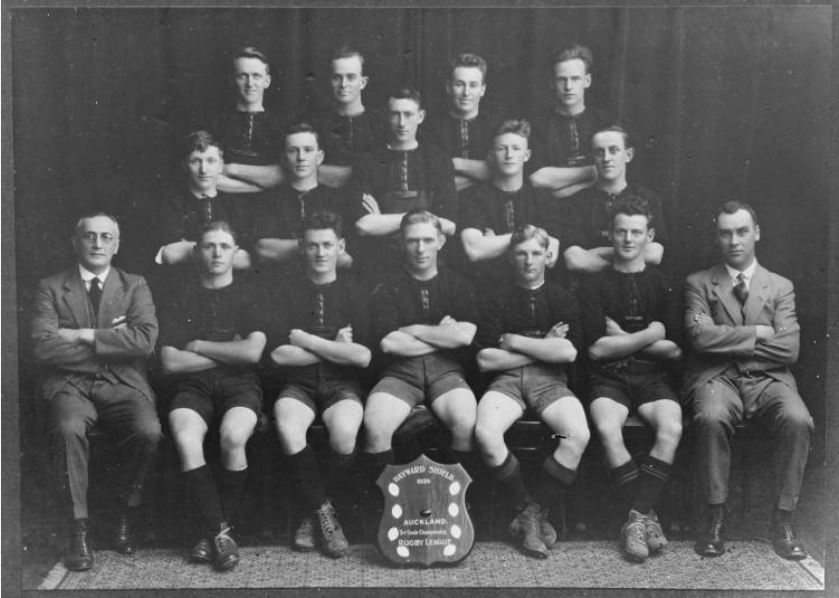
City Rovers 3rd Grade side which won the championship. Ernie Asher is seated on the left.

City Rovers won the competition after defeating Devonport United 12-2 on September 6 in the final. The standings are incomplete with 16 rounds being played but with most teams only having 3-5 results reported. City also won the knockout final on October 4 when they beat Athletic in the final 18-8. Marist were listed to play in round one but withdrew after that, Victoria Cruising Club also entered a team but had no fixtures after round 2, and Kingsland B also did not have any fixtures beyond round 2 so have not been included in the standings. Manukau withdrew in July after their boards decision to switch to rugby in protest at a transfer suspension of one of their players.

Team	Pld	W	D	L	B	F	A	Pts
City Rovers	8	8	0	0	1	156	31	16
Devonport United	4	3	0	1	3	66	20	6
Parnell	8	6	0	2	3	119	32	12
Athletic	3	3	0	0	2	71	7	6
Richmond Rovers	3	3	0	0	3	33	10	6
New Lynn	6	3	0	3	2	59	61	6
Kingsland Rovers	5	3	0	2	1	14	38	6
United Suburbs	5	2	0	3	3	34	87	4
Coromandel Old Boys	11	1	0	2	3	18	48	2
Otahuhu United	5	1	0	4	3	26	87	2
Ponsonby United	5	0	0	5	2	18	76	0
Māngere United	5	0	0	5	3	27	112	0
Point Chevalier	2	0	0	2	2	3	6	0
Manukau	3	0	0	3	2	2	31	0

=== Fourth grade ===
The competition was played over 14 rounds. Ponsonby United B won the championship after beating Richmond 10-8 in the final on August 30. Ponsonby B had won the A Section and Richmond the B Section. Parnell won the knockout final when they defeated Richmond 3-2 on October 11. City withdrew after 7 rounds, while Takapuna, and Māngere United, and withdrew after round 11 rounds. The Manukau side withdrew in July along with their entire club which switched codes to form the Manukau rugby side.

Team	Pld	W	D	L	B	F	A	Pts
Ponsonby United B	5	4	0	1	2	37	31	8
Richmond Rovers	7	6	0	1	2	61	16	12
Ponsonby United A	5	5	0	0	2	116	9	10
Parnell	6	4	0	2	2	86	11	8
Marist Old Boys	6	2	1	3	1	24	57	5
Ellerslie United	5	2	0	3	2	50	28	4
United Suburbs	8	2	0	6	1	35	115	4
Takapuna	6	1	1	4	1	19	114	3
Manukau	3	1	1	1	2	3	11	3
Newton Rangers	2	1	0	1	3	13	6	2
Devonport United	4	1	0	3	2	0	15	2
City Rovers	3	0	1	2	1	0	27	1
Māngere United	2	0	0	2	1	0	4	0

=== Fifth grade ===
Ponsonby won the championship after Newton defaulted to them in round 20. Marist entered a team but withdrew either prior to or after one week. The 1949 Rugby League Annual written by Bill Davidson states that Athletic won the A Section and Ellerslie the B Section. Richmond won the B Section knockout when they defeated Maritime. Devonport withdrew after 2 rounds and have not been included in the standings, while Manukau withdrew along with the rest of their club which switched to rugby union in July. The majority of match results were not reported so the standings are very incomplete. In round 5 it was reported in both the Auckland Star and the New Zealand Herald that Newton had beaten Athletic 82-0.

Team	Pld	W	D	L	B	F	A	Pts
Ponsonby United	8	7	0	1	1	143	42	14
Athletic	8	6	0	2	0	112	125	12
Otahuhu Rovers	6	4	0	2	0	65	42	8
Richmond Rovers	7	4	0	3	0	61	67	8
New Lynn	8	3	1	4	0	36	101	7
Newton Rangers	10	3	0	7	0	114	91	6
Ellerslie United	6	3	0	3	1	27	30	6
Northcote & Birkenhead Ramblers	6	2	1	3	0	28	66	5
Point Chevalier	7	1	0	6	0	27	54	2
Manukau	1	1	0	0	0	5	0	2

=== Sixth grade A ===
Athletic won the championship when they beat City A 6-3 in the final on October 11. Two weeks prior City A defeated Athletic 5-3 in a 'semi-final' which forced the playoff for the championship. It had been Athletics only defeat of the season. Leys Institute scored their first try of the season in a 25-3 loss to Parnell on September 13.

Team	Pld	W	D	L	B	F	A	Pts
Athletic	17	16	0	1	1	77	20	32
City Rovers A	8	5	0	3	1	120	18	10
Richmond Rovers	9	6	0	3	1	119	33	12
Marist Old Boys	7	4	1	2	1	25	29	9
Newton Rangers	7	3	0	4	1	40	66	6
Parnell	7	2	0	5	0	34	35	4
City Rovers B	4	2	0	2	1	17	33	4
Manukau	3	0	1	2	1	3	20	1
Ponsonby United	5	0	0	5	0	4	48	0
Leys Institute (Ponsonby)	8	0	0	8	0	8	145	0

=== Sixth grade B ===
Ellerslie United finished with a 12 win 0 loss season to win the championship. They scored 125 points and conceded 33, and were managed by Mr E. Chapman, and J. Poland. Ellerslie and Richmond met in the knockout final on September 20 but the result was not reported. Ponsonby seemingly withdrew after 2 rounds so have not been included in the standings. Manukau withdrew along with all their other sides when they switched to rugby union midseason in protest.

Team	Pld	W	D	L	B	F	A	Pts
Ellerslie United	12	12	0	0	1	125	33	24
Richmond Rovers	10	5	1	4	1	87	28	11
Parnell	7	3	1	3	1	50	37	7
City Rovers	7	2	0	5	1	34	33	4
Marist Old Boys	8	2	0	6	1	36	50	4
Manukau	3	2	0	1	1	9	29	4
Athletic	7	0	0	7	0	36	108	0

=== House matches ===
A series of house matches were played during the season between the following sides:

- Sharland and Company
- Kempthorne
- Ross and Glendining
- Palmer, Collins and Whittaker
- Unity and Leightons
- Clarke and Matheson
- Herald
- Mennie and Dey's
- Hayman's Limited
- Wisman's Limited
- Star
- Nathan
- United Printers (won the Morrison shield when Combined Printers defaulted to them in their one-off match)
- Combined Printers
- Smith and Smith
- Herbert Brothers

== Representative fixtures ==
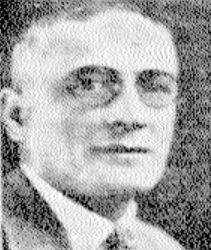
Ernie Asher

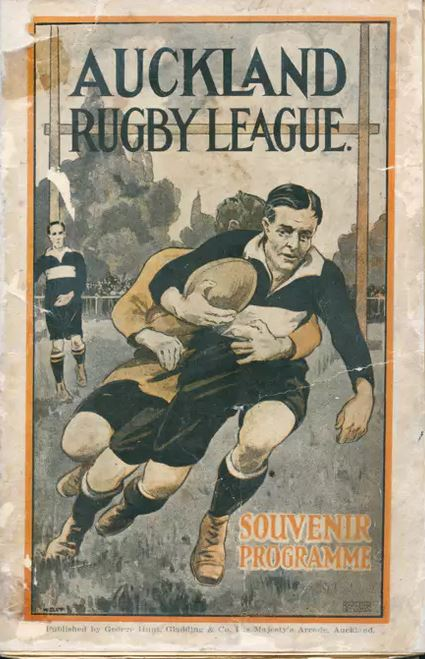
Auckland v Australian Universities souvenir program

Ernie Asher, Edwin Fox, and Ronald MacDonald were appointed selectors for the season with Bill Davidson the coach and Henry Donovan the manager. Auckland played three matches against Australian Universities on 4, 7, and 14 June. In the first match Auckland defeated the University side by 15 to 7. In the second meeting Auckland again won, this time more easily by 17 points to 2. The visiting captain congratulated the Auckland team but made mention of the conditions by saying that “yours are certainly better wet day footballers than we are but this is to be expected when you realise that my club, Sydney University has not played on a wet ground since early in 1922 season”. They had their wish somewhat in the third match with much improved weather conditions and were able to come home strongly in the second half to draw the match 14–14 in front of 11,500 people.

On 26 July in front of 20,000 spectators the touring England side defeated Auckland by 24 points to 11. In the curtain-raisers Ellerslie Sixth Grade B defeated City Sixth Grade B by 5 points to 2, and City Second grade defeated their Richmond counterparts by 8 points to 7. On the Wednesday following, an Auckland provincial team featuring Auckland players from the greater region including the Waikato region played England and lost 28 to 13 in front of 7,000 spectators.

On 20 September an Auckland team played South Auckland in Hamilton and were defeated easily by 21 points to 5. The team was supposed to be a full strength Auckland team but as the club competition was entering its key stages many of the first team players remained behind to play for their clubs. As a result, many players from the struggling Newton team made the trip to Hamilton.

=== Auckland v Australian Universities ===
4 June	Auckland	15–7	Australian Universities	Carlaw Park 1
3:00	Try: George Davidson, Ivan Littlewood 2 Con: Craddock Dufty, Bert Laing; Pen: Craddock Dufty		Try: T Barry; Con: E J Ryan; Pen: E J Ryan	Attendance: 7000; Referee: Leonard Neild

=== Auckland v Australian Universities ===
7 June	Auckland	17–2	Australian Universities	Carlaw Park 1
3:00	Try: Ben Davidson, M McNeil, Nelson Bass; Con: Craddock Dufty 3 Pen: Craddock Dufty		Pen: E J Ryan	Attendance: 4000; Referee: Bert Gallagher

=== Auckland v Australian Universities ===
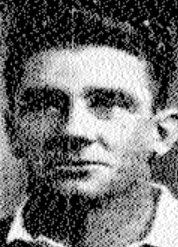
Frank Delgrosso

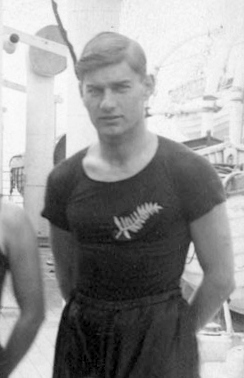
George Davidson

Frank Delgrosso had to come on the replace George Davidson after he collided badly with teammate Clarrie Polson when they were both going after the ball. Polson received a bad cut over his eye and he also later had to retire and was replaced by Billy Ghent.

14 June	Auckland	14–14	Australian Universities	Carlaw Park 1
3:00	Try: Bert Laing 2, Clarrie Polson, Harry Douglas; Con: Maurice Wetherill		Try: Ryan 2, Frank O'Rourke, Les Halberstater; Con: Dunworth	Attendance: 12,000; Referee: W Ripley

=== Probables v Possibles trial match ===
14 June	Probables	9–14	Possibles	Carlaw Park 1
1:30	Try: Paul, Webb, Norman Veart		Try: Hec Brisbane, Peebles 2, Ernie Herring; Con: Charles Gregory	Attendance: 12,000; Referee: W. L. Bull

=== Auckland B v Hamilton ===
Wilson Hall broke his collar bone during the second half and had to leave the field. The Auckland B team consisted of Charles Gregory, M Paul, Hec Brisbane, Ivan Littlewood, Lyall Stewart, Wilson Hall, A Garrett, Wally Somers, Jim O'Brien (Devonport), Len Mason, Wilfred McNeil, John Shirley, and Bill Te Whata.

16 July	Auckland B	28–18	Hamilton	Carlaw Park 1
3:00	Try: Bill Te Whata 2, John W Shirley 2, M Paul, Ivan Littlewood; Con: Wilson Hall, Charles Gregory 2 Pen: John Shirley, Len Mason		Try: McGerty, Hemingway; Con: Joseph Dufty 2 Pen: Joseph Dufty 3 Drop: Hemingway	Referee: William Mincham

=== Auckland v England ===
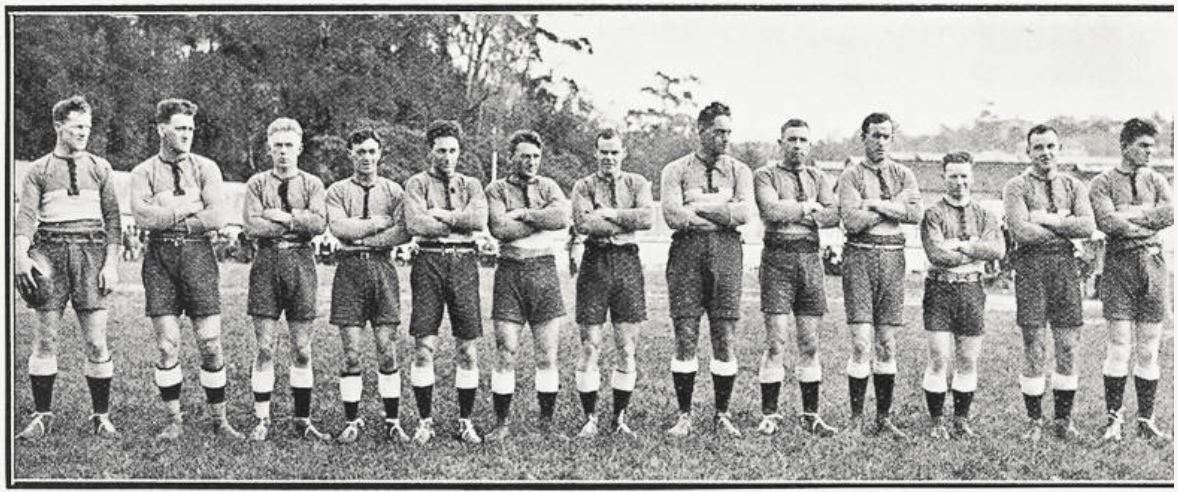
The Auckland team. During the film footage of this match it shows them posing for this photograph with Craddock Dufty joking with teammates.

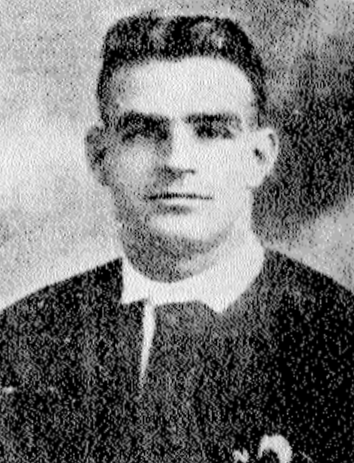
Lou Brown

There is film footage of the match taken by Tarr Film and archived on the New Zealand Archive of Film, television and Sound Ngā Taonga website. In scoring on halftime Ben Davidson was knocked out. At the start of the second half Auckland attempted to replace him with Lou Brown who ran out on to the field. However the England captain when seeing this objected as replacements were forbidden in the second half of rugby league matches at this time. Auckland were forced to play with 12 players for a time until Davidson recovered well enough to return to the field.

26 July	Auckland	11–24	England	Carlaw Park 1
3:00	Try: Ben Davidson 2, Nelson Bass; Pen: Craddock Dufty		Try: Johnny Ring 2, Frank Evans, Jack Bennett, Charlie Carr, Stan Whitty; Con: Jonty Parkin 2, Ernest Knapman; Pen: Jonty Parkin	Attendance: 20,000; Referee: Les Bull

=== Auckland Province v England ===
The team was made entirely from Auckland 'city' players with the exception of Huatahi 'Brownie' Paki and B Johnson from the Waikato (South Auckland) competition. During the first half Paki was injured and replaced by Frank Delgrosso who scored a try after a passing movement. Paki had spent the 1923 season playing in Australia for St. George.

30 July	Auckland Province	13–28	England	Carlaw Park 1
3:00	Try: Hec Brisbane, B Johnson, Frank Delgrosso; Con: Craddock Dufty; Pen: Craddock Dufty		Try: Ben Gronow, Sid Rix, Tommy Howley 2, Joe Darwell, Jack Price; Con: Ben Gronow 4 Pen: Ben Gronow	Attendance: 7,000; Referee: Leonard Neild

=== Auckland B v Lower Waikato ===
20 August	Auckland B	15–14	Lower Waikato	Carlaw Park 1
3:00	Try: John Shirley, Henry Hawkes, McDonald; Con: Arthur Mansill 2		Try: Hall, W Jackson, Welch, Alman; Con: Hall	Referee: A Bovaird

=== Auckland v South Auckland (Waikato) ===
20 September	South Auckland (Waikato)	21–5	Auckland	Steele Park, Hamilton
3:00	Try: Dufty, Hemingway, Stevenson, Raynor, Allen; Con: Dufty, Raynor; Pen: Dufty		Try: Lou Brown; Pen: Alan Clarke	Referee: W Waring

=== Junior representative fixtures ===
	Date		Score		Score	Venue
Junior representative match	30 Aug	Auckland Juniors	14	Hamilton Juniors	8	Carlaw Park # 1
Junior representative match	4 Oct	Hamilton Juniors	8	Auckland Juniors	17	Steele Park, Hamilton

== Auckland representative matches played and scorers ==
No	Name	Club Team	Play	Tries	Con	Pen	Points
1	Craddock Dufty	Athletic	4	0	4	3	14
2	Ben Davidson	City	4	3	0	0	9
3	Bert Laing	Devonport	2	2	1	0	8
4	Ivan Littlewood	Ponsonby	3	2	0	0	6
5	Nelson Bass	City	4	2	0	0	6
5	George Davidson	City	3	1	0	0	3
5	Clarrie Polson	Newton	3	1	0	0	3
8	Wilfred McNeil	Ponsonby	3	1	0	0	3
8	Harry Douglas	Devonport	1	1	0	0	3
10	Lou Brown	City	1	1	0	0	3
11	Maurice Wetherill	City	5	0	1	0	2
11	Alan Clarke	Newton	1	0	0	1	2
13	A Garratt	Devonport	1	0	0	0	0
14	Jim O'Brien	Marist	2	0	0	0	0
14	Alf Townsend	City	3	0	0	0	0
14	Bill Stormont	Marist	2	0	0	0	0
14	Hec McDonald	City	3	0	0	0	0
14	Bert Avery	Athletic	2	0	0	0	0
14	Frank Delgrosso	Ponsonby	3	0	0	0	0
14	Jim O'Brien	Devonport	2	0	0	0	0
14	Billy Ghent	Marist	1	0	0	0	0
14	Charles Gregory	Marist	1	0	0	0	0
23	Hec Brisbane	Marist	1	0	0	0	0
24	Ernie Herring	Athletic	1	0	0	0	0
24	Wally Somers	Newton	1	0	0	0	0
24	George Gardiner	Marist	1	0	0	0	0
24	Selby Crewther	City	1	0	0	0	0
24	Robert (Bob) Crewther	City	1	0	0	0	0
24	Tommy Pai	Māngere	1	0	0	0	0
24	George Mormon	Ponsonby	1	0	0	0	0
24	Lipscombe	Māngere	1	0	0	0	0
24	Jack Pai	Māngere	1	0	0	0	0
24	Ernie Mackie	City	1	0	0	0	0
24	John Wallett Shirley	Ponsonby	1	0	0	0	0

There were several members of the Lipscombe family playing for the Māngere club and it is unclear which of them played in the forwards for Auckland in their match with South Auckland on September 20.
