= Bill Te Whata =

NZ international rugby league & union footballer

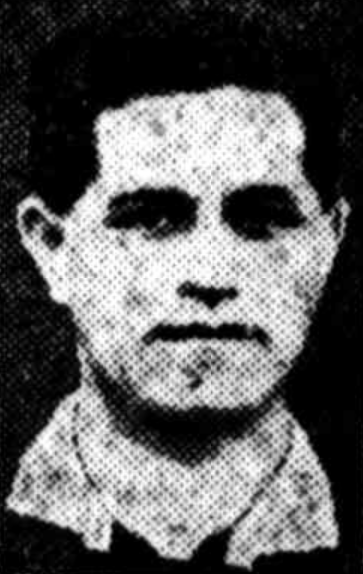

Personal information
- Full name: Wiremu (William) Te Whata
- Born: 1893 Kohukohu, Northland, New Zealand
- Died: 19 September 1957 (aged 63–64) Gisborne, New Zealand

Playing information
- Height: 5 ft 11 in (1.80 m)
- Weight: 87 kg (13 st 10 lb)

Rugby union
Club
Years	Team	Pld	T	G	FG	P
1918–21	Waima RC
1920–21	Tokomaru (sub union)	3	3	0	0	9
	Total	3	3	0	0	9
Representative
Years	Team	Pld	T	G	FG	P
1921	East Coast	1	0	0	0	0
1921	Poverty Bay	1	1	0	0	3
1921	Poverty Bay/Hawke's Bay combined	1	0	0	0	0
1921	New Zealand Māori	1	0	0	0	0

Rugby league
- Position: Second-row
Club
Years	Team	Pld	T	G	FG	P
1922	Fire Brigade	3	0	0	0	0
1924–26	Athletic/Grafton Athletic	16	4	0	0	12
	Total	19	4	0	0	12
Representative
Years	Team	Pld	T	G	FG	P
1922	New Zealand Māori	9	5	1	0	17
1922–25	Auckland Province	3	0	0	0	0
1922	Australasia	2	3	2	0	13
1924–25	Auckland B	4	8	0	0	24
1924	New Zealand	1	0	0	0	0
1925	Auckland	1	0	0	0	0

Bill (Wiremu/William) Te Whata was a New Zealand Māori rugby union and rugby league representative. He also played one test for the New Zealand rugby league team in 1924 becoming Kiwi number 159.

== Early life ==
Wiremu Te Whata was born in Northland, New Zealand, in 1893. His father was Eru Te Whata, and mother Ripeka Ruku Te Whata (nee Kaihe). Eru died in 1907 aged 35. He had a brother, John William Te Whata. In the 1910s Wiremu (also known as William, or Bill) moved to live in Tokomaru Bay on the East Coast of the North Island.

== Playing career ==
=== Rugby Union playing days ===
Bill Te Whata began playing rugby on the East Coast of the North Island. He played for the Waima Rugby Club from 1918 to 1921. On 28 August 1920 he played for 'Waiapu County' (situated near Ruatoria) against Hawkes Bay. After a "forward sweep" Te Whata "got over and scored" their only try in a 12–3 loss where a trumpet was blown to announce the end of the match. When they played four days later against a Hawke's Bay Māori side their manager told the Hastings Standard that they were in fact a "country team, picked in Tokomaru, from a population of from 1000 to 1500 people" rather than the Waiapu district. They were therefore called Tokomaru for this match which was drawn 9 all after they scored a try on full-time. Te Whata had earlier scored a try following "a splendid bit of passing" among his teammates.

In 1921 Te Whata again turned out for the Tokomaru side. They played a match against the visiting Tolaga Bay side which saw a 6–6 draw with Te Whata continuing his try scoring feats notching a try for the hosts. Te Whata was then named in the East Coast side to play against Poverty Bay on 13 August at the Childers Road Reserve. East Coast was just beginning as combined rep team with players made up from Te Araroa, Tokomaru, Tolaga Bay, Tikitiki, and Ruatoria. Te Whata's weight was listed as 13 stone. East Coast won the match 8–6 in front of a big crowd. A week later Te Whata was to gain selection for his opponent when he was picked in the Poverty Bay side to play against Hawkes Bay on 27 August. The East Coast team he had played for was not a fully fledged union and therefore the players from there were eligible to play for Poverty Bay. Poverty Bay lost the match 12 points to 3 with Te Whata scoring their only points after a scrum on the Hawke's Bay line. The game saw considerable interest because the match was essentially a trial to see who would be picked in the combined team to play against the touring Springboks. This saw a crowd of around 2,500 in attendance though the game was generally regarded as disappointing.

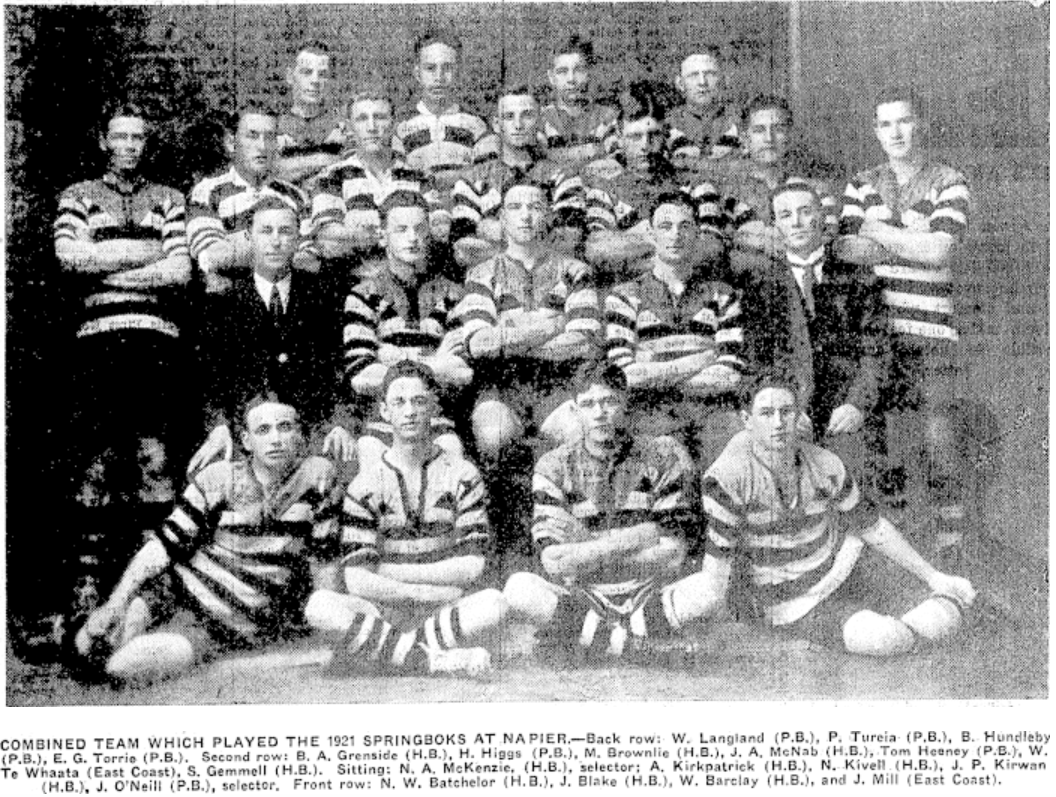

Te Whata was then selected for the combined Poverty Bay & Hawke's Bay side to play against the Springboks on 3 September at McLean Park in Napier. The Springboks won 14–8 in front of a crowd of between 7 and 8 thousand with Te Whata playing in the forwards. He was then picked in the New Zealand Māori team to play the Springboks at the same venue four days later on 7 September. The Springboks won by a solitary point 9–8 before a crowd of 6,000 spectators.

=== Switch to Rugby League ===
In 1922 Bill Te Whata made the move to rugby league. A story is related where George Gillett, the famous All Black and New Zealand rugby league player was working as a publican in the Gisborne area at the time. He approached Joe Lockwood, his twin brother Mason, and Te Whata and asked them if they would go to Auckland "for a trial of league".

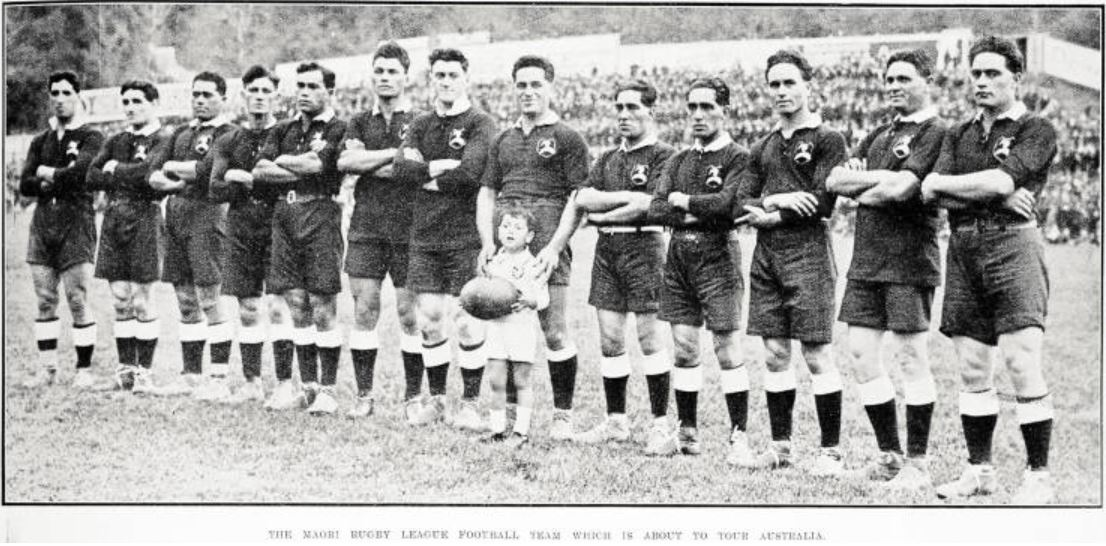
Te Whata, behind the ball boy in the NZ Māori team to play Auckland at Carlaw Park on 20 May 1922

It is unclear if there was a trial but Te Whata was to play for New Zealand Māori against Auckland on 20 May at Carlaw Park as part of their build up to their Australian tour. The Māori side won by 28 points to 18 against a strong Auckland team which featured 12 current or future Kiwi internationals. Te Whata was listed as being 26 years of age at the time. He was to score a try which sealed the game which he also converted in front of 7,000 spectators. The match also saw £297 2s 6d raised at the gate. They then played an inter squad exhibition match before the departure of the team for Australia. The match was described as "more or less of a scramble" with the A team winning 44 points to 14 despite many tries not even seeing a conversion attempted and Te Whata scoring 5 tries for the winning side. Many spectators who had paid for admission asked for their money refunded and the Auckland Rugby League decided to recommend to New Zealand Council that the gate money be donated to charity. Te Whata was then officially named in the touring side alongside the likes of Huatahi Paki, George Gardiner, Sam Lowrie, George Paki, and Craddock Dufty.

In their first tour match they were destroyed by the Metropolis team at the Sydney Cricket Ground in front of an enormous crowd of 35,000. At the end of the match the scoreboard read "Metroplis 77 New Zealand Māori 13" while a headline read "Defence shattered like chaff before a storm". Te Whata played in the second row but went off injured just after halftime. They had a much better time of it in their next match against the New South Wales 2nd XIII, this time losing by the more respectable margin of 31 points to 14 in front of a 30,000 strong crowd with Te Whata again playing in the second row.

The side then moved to Queensland where they met the Queensland side at Davies Park in Brisbane. Te Whata played his third consecutive match in the second row and he scored a try. New Zealand Māori won 23 points to 22 after a storming comeback. They had fallen behind 5–22, and a try on full-time snatched victory in front of 7,000 spectators. The 4th tour match was against Toowoomba at Athletic Oval in Toowoomba where he was again in his customary position of the second row. The local side won 26 to 6 with Te Whata scoring a try and his line kicking being "a feature of the game". Just one day later the New Zealand Māori side played Ipswich and were defeated 20 points to 3 with several of the touring side backing up, including Te Whata. The team was coming in for a lot of criticism for its lack of team work and unusual selection policies though Te Whata was described as a "fine individual player"

He scored his third try of the tour in a 31–19 loss to Queensland in their second match with that opponent on Davies Park in Brisbane. There were 6,000 spectators at the match which saw New Zealand Māori "show improvement in combination". Te Whata's try came in the second half which also saw Craddock Dufty ordered off for insulting the referee. The New Zealand Māori side then secured their second win of the tour when they beat Stanthorpe 6 points to 3 with Te Whata scoring New Zealand's second try. They then rounded out the tour with a 32–0 loss to the Metropolis team who had trounced them at the beginning of the tour, Te Whata again lining out in the second row, before a final match with Orange which they won 25–15 before they returned to New Zealand. He had ultimately played in at least 7 of the 9 matches.

At the end of the season Te Whata was awarded a gold medal, which was presented to him by Mr. W. Pascoe of Auckland "for the best all-round player" of the Australian tour. In the meantime he had returned to Auckland where he joined the Fire Brigade club (previously known as Grafton Athletic) in Auckland's first grade competition. Te Whata was to play alongside his Māori teammates George Gardiner, B Pitman, and Moses Yeats in the side to play on 8 July against City Rovers.

Towards the end of the season on 20 September he was selected for the Auckland Provincial team to play the touring New South Wales side. They were beaten 21–20 on the Auckland Domain in front of 5,500.

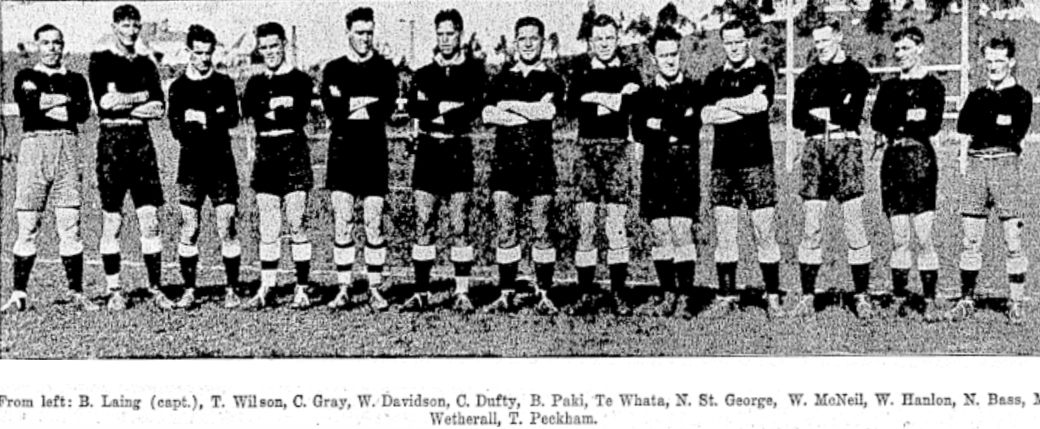

Te Whata was then selected to play in a combined New Zealand and New South Wales team to play against the touring 'Australian' side (New South Wales in reality). This team became known as "Australasia" and because of an unsurprising lack of combination were thrashed in both matches they played against some of the best players in the world. They were composed of seven Auckland club players including Te Whata and six players from Australia. On the Auckland Domain before 12,000 spectators Te Whata's Australasian team was beaten by New South Wales 65 to 27, though he did score three tries for the 'home' side. Te Whata's first try came after he broke away with Nelson Bass and Johnson, the second when he broke away with Bert Avery "scoring brilliantly", and the third in the second half when the match became very loose. Both teams had a player ordered off (Wally Somers and Alf O'Connor), and lost a player through injury (Dick Vest and George Davidson) thus finishing with 11 men aside. The same two teams met on 29 September in Taumarunui however the score line was even more lopsided and the newspaper headline which said it was a "High Scoring Match" was not exaggerating. The New South Wales team winning by the incredible score of 87 to 16 in front of 2,000 spectators. Te Whata contributed 4 points as he converted 2 tries.

=== Rugby Union reinstatement controversy ===
At the start of the 1923 season Bill Te Whata attempted to be reinstated into the rugby union ranks. He appeared before the New Zealand Rugby Union Executive to state his case on 23 May. In what was to become a somewhat infamous case that was widely reported in newspapers throughout New Zealand Te Whata admitted to receiving money to play rugby league. This was a moment that New Zealand Rugby had been waiting for years to substantiate their consistent allegations that the rugby league code in New Zealand had been paying its players. What Te Whata did not make clear until much later however was that the money he was referring to had largely come from the New South Wales Rugby League body, and not from New Zealand Rugby League. The later organisation only paying him for out of pocket expenses as was what they maintained was the case for all representative players throughout this period. Te Whata was asked if he had received money and replied "Yes, £4 10s a week, a total of £73 10s. For two months in Australia £36, and a bonus of £24 (1922), and while with the New Zealand League representatives between 9 September 1922, and 6 October 1922, the sum of £13 10s". He went on to say in his application that he realised he had "made a mistake in playing League, but I have left the League, and wish to rejoin my old club or any club". His appeal was endorsed by the East Coast Rugby Union. The NZ Rugby Union rather matter of factly refused his application with Mr. A. C. Kitto stating "he has expelled himself. We cannot admit him".

=== Continuation in Rugby League ===
Te Whata was to try to appeal again three more times but was knocked back each time including in June of the 1924 season. They did however state that if he wished he could appeal again in 12 months time. It appears that rather than miss another year of playing when he would have been in his prime oval ball playing years he decided to return to the rugby league field.

In a story in the Gisborne Herald on 26 June it was said that he was "joining the ranks of the Benedict's on Wednesday", and "after going to Timaru for his honeymoon, Mr Te Whata goes to Auckland, where he is to play against the English League team". It was noted in the same story that other players on the same tour had been re-instated. Te Whata said that he was disappointed and could not understand the attitude of the rugby union and said "play league again; Can you blame me?".

Rather astonishingly the match Te Whata was referring to was the first test between New Zealand and England at Carlaw Park. Considering the match was 5 weeks away and the team was a similar number of weeks away from being selected this claim was somewhat interesting. His statement did however turn out to be true.

On 4 July Te Whata had to appear before the New Zealand (rugby league) Council to explain his application to be reinstated into rugby union and the remarks he had made about receiving money to play rugby league. Te Whata said "I stated clearly on the application I sent in that I received money from the New South Wales League". He went on to sign a declaration that he had not received money from the New Zealand League, and "that he had never received any money other than out of pocket expenses while playing under the League's jurisdiction". He then had his application approved by the council.

He joined the Athletic club after being granted a transfer by the Auckland Rugby League subject to approval by the New Zealand Council. He had played for Athletic the weekend prior on June 28 in a 14–5 win over Ellerslie. And on 5 July he scored a try in a 6–6 draw. He was on the end of a pass from his former New Zealand Māori teammate Craddock Dufty and "literally dived over and scored Athletic's first try". He played another match against Ponsonby United before being selected in the Auckland B team to play against Hamilton. Te Whata scored 2 tries in a 28–18 win in the match played at Carlaw Park. The following weekend he scored a further try for Athletic in a 25–0 win over Richmond Rovers.

The England team then arrived in New Zealand. Te Whata was selected to play for the Auckland Provincial team to meet them in their 3rd tour match on 30 July. England won by 28–3 in front of 7,000 spectators at Carlaw Park. Te Whata played in the front row alongside Bert Avery and Hec McDonald. He was heavily involved in the match where he "distinguished himself in smothering movements by the visitors" and "working hard", he also took a long pass and passed on to Hec Brisbane who ran in for a try. The Auckland Star also noted that in "Te Whata and McDonald we had two forwards as good as the visitors".

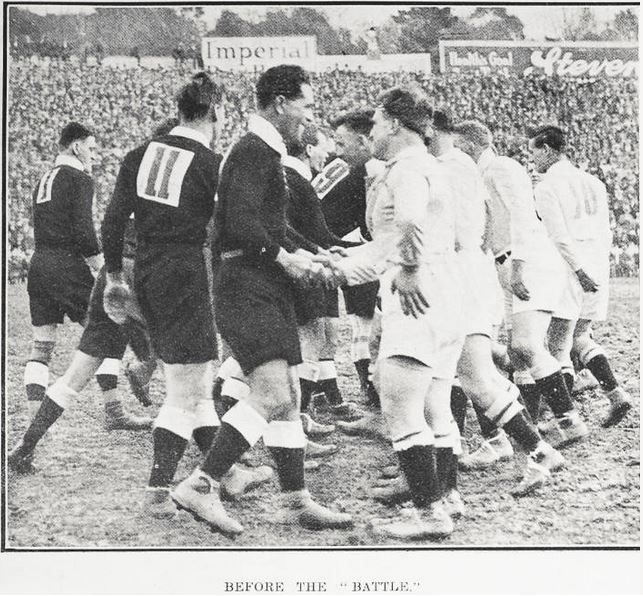
Te Whata shaking the hands of an opponent before the 1st test on 2 August 1924

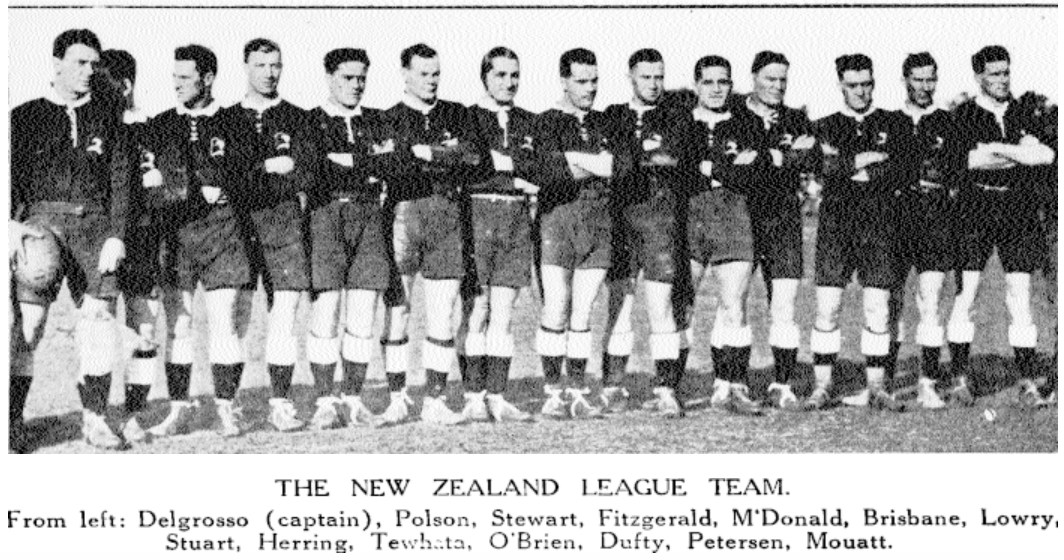

Following this match Te Whata was chosen to play in the first test match against England. This was to be his one and only appearance in the New Zealand jersey. The test was played at Carlaw Park in front of 22,000 spectators, where the ground was covered in mud and the players struggled in the conditions. New Zealand prevailed with an historic 16–8 victory. Te Whata was to play in his more familiar position of the second row where he was supported by Neil Mouat, and Bert Avery. He broke through with the ball at his feet and from the resulting play Ernie Herring picked the ball up and scored queuing "deafening cheers" which put New Zealand 11–3 ahead. Te Whata was then named in the squad to play in the second test won by New Zealand 13–11 but did not take the field and the same happened for the third test won by England 31–18.

Te Whata did not return to play for Athletic until midway through the 1925 season. Like he often did he returned to Tokomaru in the off season. He caught the Wainui ship to Auckland on 24 May. In 1925 Te Whata was first named to play in the round 6 match with Ponsonby United on 30 May where he was to play in the unfamiliar position of centre where he was said to have been only "fair". He scored his only try of the season in a 50–23 loss in the Roope Rooster to Ponsonby.

Te Whata missed selection for the New Zealand team to tour Australia but was picked for the Auckland B team to embark on a southern tour of the West Coast, Canterbury, and Wellington. His weight was listed at 13 stone, 10 pounds and his age 29 which would mean he was born around 1896, not the 1893 that other records show. Auckland defeated West Coast 22–15 before a 6–5 loss to Canterbury where Te Whata scored Auckland B's only try. He then had a field day against Wellington with a 5 try performance in a 68 to 9 win at Newton Park. The Evening Post described Te Whata as "one of the sturdiest of the Auckland team" and when compared to Ben Davidson who scored 3 tries and who would soon go on to play for Wigan as being "easier to catch, but harder to stop".

When Te Whata returned to Auckland he made his debut in the full Auckland team to play in a Northern Union Challenge Cup match against South Auckland. Auckland had won the trophy off South Auckland six weeks earlier and were seeking to retain it and they did so with a comfortable 36–19 win. Then on 10 October Te Whata played for the Auckland Province team against the touring Queensland side. He was named in the reserves but took the field when the Auckland fullback Raynor was carried off on a stretcher just before halftime. At the start of the second half Te Whata surprisingly took the field in the wing three-quarter position. The match was already over from a competitive stand point as Queensland led by 28 points to 6 at halftime and they went on to win 54–14. He was beaten by Cecil Aynsley who scored a try shortly before halftime but later got revenge of a sort when "he beat Aynsley for possession, and nearing the twenty-five passed to Singe, who ran over to score".

In 1926 Te Whata again turned out for the Athletic team who had now assumed the name of Grafton Athletic. He scored a try in a 13–6 win over Devonport United on the Devonport Domain.

It seems that this was to be the last time that Bill Te Whata put on either a rugby league or a rugby union jersey. He returned to Tokomaru Bay and 7 years later in 1934 the East Coast Rugby Union was asked by the Tokomaru Bay sub-union to recommend the reinstatement of W. Te Whata with the New Zealand Rugby Football Union. The East Coast Union's management committee gave strong support to the proposal. It was said in the Poverty Bay Herald that as the league game was not played on the East Coast he had no opportunity to play and had been "out of football for several years". The application was refused and the East Coast Rugby Union decided "after considerable discussion" to apply once again. It is unclear if he ever was reinstated but there is no link with him and the rugby game after this time though he remained active in athletics, cycling and bowls throughout the 1930s and 40s in the Poverty Bay area.

== Personal life ==
Bill (Wiremu) Te Whata married May Violet Te Whata (nee Hale) on 23 July 1919 however she died just 3 years later in 1922 aged 26. He then married Irene Mary Potaka on 25 June 1924. They had 4 children, Edna Passcendale Te Whata (surname Olsen after marriage), born in 1919, Douglas William Te Whata who was born on 7 April 1928, Phillip Te Whata, and Clarence Clair Te Whata.

In 1925 in the electoral roll records Te Whata's occupation was recorded as "native interpreter" and he was resident in Tokomaru Bay.

After retiring from rugby league Te Whata spent many years involved in sport such as Athletics and cycling in the Poverty Bay area as well as being on the Tokomaru Bay Public School committee. On 7 February 1945 Bill's brother Johnny died as the result of an accident in Gisborne. His death notice in the Gisborne Herald stated that he was the "beloved son of Edward and Repeka Te Whata, of Hokianga" and was aged 40 years. He was driving a tractor along the river bank between Peel Street and Lowe Street when under the employ of the Gisborne Borough Council. The tractor rolled over and pinned him underneath it. He was said to have come to live on the East Coast after leaving Hokianga 23 years earlier with a party of Ngāpuhi bushfellers. His funeral took place at Poho-o-rawiri Pa, Kaiti on 10 February.

=== Death ===
Bill Te Whata died on 19 September 1957 aged 64. He was buried at Taruheru Cemetery in Gisborne. His son Douglas William Te Whata died in 1969 aged 41. His wife Irene died in 1973 aged 67 while their daughter Edna died in 1984 aged 65.
