= George Gardiner (rugby league) =

New Zealand international rugby league player

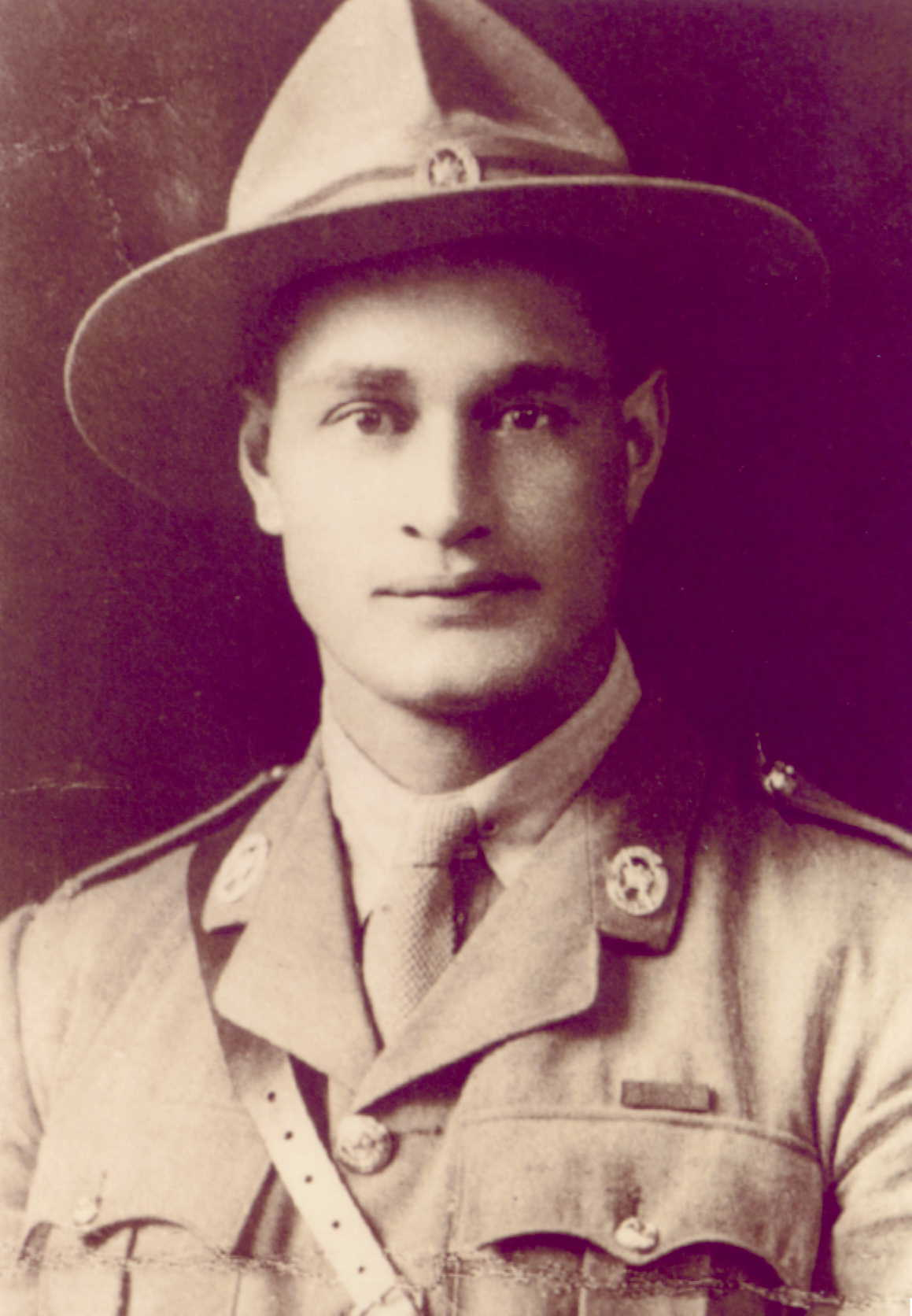
- Gardiner in military uniform during World War I

Personal information
- Full name: Tekati George Gardiner
- Born: 23 April 1898 Tauranga, New Zealand
- Died: 18 May 1941 (aged 43) Cyrenaica, Libya

Playing information
- Height: 185 cm (6 ft 1 in)
- Weight: 85 kg (13 st 5 lb)

Rugby union
- Position: Centre, Loose forward
Club
Years	Team	Pld	T	G	FG	P
1912	Matakana	3	0	0	0	0
1913–19	United	4	2	0	0	6
1920	Rangataua
	Total	7	2	0	0	6
Representative
Years	Team	Pld	T	G	FG	P
1913–19	Te Puke (sub-union)	7	1	2	0	7
1914	Tauranga (sub-union)	1	1	0	0	3
1918–19	New Zealand Maori Pioneer Battalion	6	2	1	0	8
1919	Bay of Plenty	1	0	1	0	2

Rugby league
- Position: Wing, Centre, Second-row
Club
Years	Team	Pld	T	G	FG	P
1922	Fire Brigade	1	0	0	0	0
1924	Marist Old Boys	12	9	22	0	71
1925–32	Ponsonby United	93	46	49	0	236
1931	Waterside Workers (Akl)	6	2	5	0	16
	Total	112	57	76	0	323
Representative
Years	Team	Pld	T	G	FG	P
1922	New Zealand Māori	9	5	3	1	23
1922	Tauranga (sub-union)	1	1	0	0	3
1922	Bay of Plenty	2	2	3	0	12
1922	Te Puke (sub-union)	1	0	0	0	0
1924–25	Auckland	4	3	1	0	11
1925	Auckland Province	1	0	0	0	0
1926	New Zealand	21	10	13	0	53

George Gardiner was a New Zealand rugby league representative player. He played for New Zealand in 1926 becoming the 185th New Zealand representative. He was also a Bay of Plenty rugby representative as well as playing for the first ever Bay of Plenty rugby league team. After he finished his rugby league career he became a professional wrestler fighting mainly in Australia. He fought in World War 1 for New Zealand and fought and died serving in the Australian forces in World War 2.

== Early life ==
Tekati George Gardiner's date of birth was April 23, 1898 however it was given as 1 February 1894 on his enlistment papers for World War 1. This was a fake date which enabled him to be accepted into the forces. Later when he enlisted in the Australian forces for World War 2 he gave his date of birth as 3 August 1903. In an article from the Bay of Plenty Times on 16 April 1917 about his special medal during World War 1 he was said to be 19 years old. His obituary also stated that he was playing rugby for Matakana seniors in 1914 aged 16. Both of these articles suggest his birth year would have been around 1898.

Gardiner was born at Rangiwaea, Tauranga. His father was Petera Callighan Te Karehana (Gardiner) (1879–1963, and his mother was Rewa Te Rani Karehana Gardiner (1878–1903). He belonged to the Ngāi Te Rangi iwi and was a member of the Catholic faith. He was a member of the Tauranga cadets until he left the Matakana Native School and became a mechanical engineer, and worked for Herbert Clark of Tauranga before the outbreak of World War 1.

== Playing career ==
=== Junior rugby beginnings ===
Gardiner began playing rugby at a young age, first playing for the Matakana juniors in 1912 aged around 14. He played for them against Star on 25 May 1912 in a 0–13 loss and was mentioned as being "conspicuous" in the losing side. He was a well known local athlete and competed at many local athletic events. In the 1913 season he began playing senior rugby for United and in 2 games for them in June he scored a try in each match against Paengaroa and Rangiuru respectively. He was then selected to play for the Te Puke sub-union representative team aged around 15. He played 3 matches for them, the first being in a 6–0 win against Tauranga. He then appeared in 2 losses against Rotorua (3–23, and 6–10). It was said that he played a "good defensive game… but appeared to be rather weak on attack". The 1914 season saw him starting for the Matakana seniors in a 7-aside competition on 5 June, and then in the forwards for the full side against Rangataua on 22 June in a Jordan Cup match. Then on 8 October he played in a match for the Tauranga sub-union team against the visiting Waihi. Gardiner scored a try in an easy 22–3 win.

== World War 1 ==
World War 1 had broken out and Gardiner enlisted for the army. He served in the 1st Maori Contingent. He left Tauranga for Auckland on board the Ngapuhi to go into camp on 20 October. he commenced his duty on 2 February 1915 and spent 1915–16 in Egypt before moving to the Egyptian Eastern Front in 1916, and was at Gallipoli in 1915. He spent time on the Western Front from 1916, 17 and 18. Gardiner sent a letter home dated 2 December 1915 from the Dardanelles saying "we are doing fine here; slow but sure. Mr Turk occasionally breaks out with fresh energy, but it is no use. What we have we hold, and I think the Turks are fed up with it. There have been a lot of prisoners taken including German officers, and if you take anything by looks they seem to be glad to be taken. They are a motley crowd, young and old. Some of them you would think hardly had enough strength to fight, but of course they are driven to it. We are all hoping that the war here will not last much longer, as the Turks are being hemmed in, and their casualties are heavy. I expect everybody at home is quite gloomy in finding no time for holidays, but I cannot see why they should be so. They ought to come out here for a week or two and see the antics of some of the boys. It would liven them up. I went to an open air concert behind the firing lines, and I can tell you there were some good turns, only every now and then the bag of a French battery would upset the programme". He was wounded twice while at war in 1916 and 1917. Word was received in July 1916 by his father George Gardiner (snr) from the Minister of Defence, the Hon. James Allen that he had been "slightly wounded in the head and face on 27 June" but was remaining with his unit. In April 1917 Gardiner's father received word from the Minister of Defence once again however this time it was regarding an award he had won. He was "awarded the Cross of Karageorge, First Class, for gallantry on the Field of action". The cross was awarded by the King of Serbia.

Late on in the war when he "slipped over in a trench and hit his elbow so hard he was forced to recover in hospital". Then in 1918 with the war drawing to a close Gardiner was selected to play in the New Zealand Maori Pioneer Battalion rugby team which played 7 matches in Egypt, 17 in continental Europe, and 7 in England with 29 wins and only 2 losses. Gardiner returned from the war on the Westmoreland in early April, 1919. After it arrived in Auckland he caught the Ngapuhi to the Bay of Plenty on 8 April where they were welcomed home by the mayor. Lieutenant Gardiner was in charge of the men and after the Reverend Waaka spoke to them Gardiner replied "briefly". Many relatives and friends of the men had travelled to Auckland to meet the men and travelled with them back to Tauranga.

He was awarded the 1914-1915 Star "for distinguished services rendered during the course of the campaign", the British War Medal (1914–1920), the Victory Medal, the Cross of Karageorge, 1st Class with Swords (Serbia), and the ANZAC Commemorative Medallion.

== Post war club and representative rugby career ==
=== New Zealand Māori Pioneer Battalion tour of New Zealand ===
In mid May the New Zealand Māori Pioneer Battalion team embarked on a nine match tour of New Zealand. Their first match was against Hawkes Bay at McLean Park, Napier on 17 May. They won the match 8 to 3 with Gardiner playing in the forwards. They then travelled to Otago and Southland though Gardiner not play in either of these two matches lost 6–9 and won 18–6 respectively. Their next match was against Canterbury on 31 May with Gardiner resuming his position in the forwards and leading the side. They lost the game 6–16 at the Addington Showgrounds in Christchurch. He didn't play in their drawn match with Wellington before next taking the field in Auckland against the local side. They again went down 11–22. He played again against Manawatu at Palmerston North where the Pioneers were 22–9 winners. He then scored his first try of the tour crossing the line to give them a 17–6 lead in an eventual 25–6 win over Hawke's Bay in Napier. Their final match of their tour was on 21 June against Poverty Bay at Childers Road Reserve in front of 3,000 spectators. Gardiner scored in the corner from a scrum and he converted his own try with the Pioneer side finishing with an entertaining 24–12 win.

=== United, Te Puke, and Bay of Plenty ===
Following the Pioneer teams tour Gardiner joined the United club and played against Paengaroa on 30 June. In the meantime he had gone into business with Davis as tobacconist and billiard saloon proprietors. Their business was named simply ‘Davis & Gardiner’ and they were based at the Alliance Hall in Te Puke. He played for United again against Rangataua before being selected for Te Puke to contest the Kusabs Cup against Whakatāne. The home team Te Puke won the match 5–0 meaning they would play Rotorua in the final. The Kusabs Cup final was played on the Arawa Park racecourse ground in Rotorua in front of a large crowd. Gardiner was heavily involved in many of Te Puke's attacks and he kicked a conversion in their comfortable 22–0 win. Gardiner then played against Rotorua again on 6 September at Te Puke. He scored their only try in a 3–6 loss where "from loose play [he] forced his way across and touched down" and was said to have played a "slashing game". His final appearance for Te Puke for the season came in a 29–3 win over Tauranga on 20 September. Te Puke won easily by 29 points to 3.

Gardiner was then selected to make his debut for the Bay of Plenty team in their match against Auckland on 27 September in the "supports" position. The match was played at Eden Park and saw Bay of Plenty upset the local side by 25 to 16 with Gardiner kicking a conversion.

In April 1920 he competed as a runner for Te Puke at the Tauranga sports meeting and was said to be "the most successful athlete at the gathering". He won the ‘sheaf tossing’ event in a field of nineteen, was second in the Returned Soldiers’ 100 yard race, second also in the ‘stepping the chain’ event, and first in the Returned Soldiers’ Maori only race.

He began the 1920 season playing in the Te Puke club competition for Rangataua in a match with Maketu on 8 May. His appearances for them appear limited to the start of the season as the majority of his season was spent playing representative rugby for Te Puke and Bay of Plenty. He played for Rangataua against the Te Puke club side on 29 May and was then selected to play for the Te Puke sub-union team against Tauranga on 12 June. Gardiner shone for Te Puke in the ‘rover’ position, and scored all of their points in a 13–12 win with 2 tries, 2 conversions, and a penalty. It was said in the Bay of Plenty Times that he was "one of the greatest forwards in the Dominion".

He captained the Bay of Plenty side for their match against Poverty Bay at Whakatāne on 18 June. They won 8 to 0 in torrential rain. They then played a trial match with Rotorua and won 9–6 with Gardiner kicking 2 penalties. The purpose of the match was to prepare for their southern tour where they would play Wellington for the Ranfurly Shield followed by a match with Wanganui. The match with Wellington resulted in a 23 to 3 loss on Athletic Park in Wellington. The match against Wanganui on 3 July at the recreation ground there saw a 0–0 draw.

Gardiner's next match was for Te Puke against the Grafton club side from Auckland. The match saw another draw, this time 3–3. He played for Bay of Plenty against Auckland on 31 July with the Bay side winning 17–10 and Gardiner scoring a try at the Tauranga Domain in front of a crowd of 2,000. His try came about after he "secured the ball forty yards out and running at top speed outpaced the Auckland backs and scored the best try of the day, grounding between the posts". A match for Te Puke against Tauranga followed on 14 August which was lost 6–9. Sometime soon after this Gardiner's business interests changed with his business in Te Puke with Mr W. Davis moving solely into Davis’ hands. Gardiner then moved back to the Tauranga area as on 22 October he turned out for Tauranga in their match with Te Puna in the Jordan Cup final. He scored a try, and kicked a penalty and a goal from a mark to score all 9 of their points in a 9–17 loss. He then finished his season with another match for Tauranga against Whakatāne on 29 October which was also lost 6–9.

=== Disqualification and boxing ===
Controversy marred the beginning of the 1921 season for Gardiner as he had played for Tauranga while under suspension by the Te Puke Union and without a clearance to play for Tauranga at the end of the previous season. Te Puke had disqualified him from playing for 12 months but Tauranga had asked for full evidence. Te Puke then wrote a letter requesting that his disqualification be lifted.

On 28 June it was reported that a boxing school was being started in Te Puke with Gardiner one of those who would be joining it. He was already being coached by Mr W.A. Voice and Mr B. Treweek who were to be the schools coaches. On 11 July he fought A. James in Auckland as part of the Auckland provincial amateur boxing championships at the Auckland Town Hall. Gardiner was weighed in at 13st 2lb while his opponent was 11st 9lb. Gardiner lost the fight after going down for a six count after taking a right punch, while earlier in the fight he had fallen through the ropes after backing away from James’ punches.

=== Return to rugby field with Rovers (Te Puke) ===
Gardiner began the year competing at an athletics meeting at Matatā. He won the hop, step, and jump event, and placed first in the 100 yards handicap. He also won the ‘maiden race’ but was disqualified having previously won a race.

Gardiner had begun playing rugby again but was once again playing for a new team. He was named to captain the Rovers side in Te Puke in their match against Tauranga Football Club on 22 April. He was well involved in an 8–3 win. He played further matches for them against Rangiuru, Railway, and United where he scored 2 tries in a 28–5 win. This was to be his last ever official rugby union game.

== Rugby league playing career ==
=== New Zealand Māori tour ===
In April Jim Rukutai had sent George Iles, based in Tauranga a letter telling him that he wished to establish the league code in the area. He said that he had heard a lot about Gardiner (amongst others) and was organising a team of Māori footballers to go to Australia later in the year. Gardiner was indeed selected and agreed to go on the tour as vice-captain. They had assembled in Auckland in late May and he was joined by his Rovers teammate Fred Harawira.

Their first match was against Auckland at Carlaw Park on 20 May prior to their departure and saw New Zealand Māori win 28 to 16. After arriving in Australia they played a very powerful Sydney Metropolis side and were thrashed 12–77 at the Sydney Cricket Ground in front of an enormous crowd of 35,000. Gardiner played in the loose forward position and kicked 2 conversions. He then played lock in a 32–14 loss to New South Wales 2nd XIII. He kicked 2 conversions and a penalty before 30,000 spectators once again at the Sydney Cricket Ground. Gardiner than played in the centres in an upset 23–22 win over Queensland in Brisbane on 10 June. The Māori side trailed by 22 to 5 before a huge late surge saw them score 4 tries to take the match. Three days later he played centre again against Toowoomba, this time they went down 26–6 before 2,000 spectators. Further losses followed to Ipswich (3–20), and then Queensland (19–31). Gardiner had been moved to the wing and he scored 2 tries there against Queensland in their narrow loss. Gardiner then played in match 8 of the tour against Stanthorpe which they won 6–3, and Orange on 28 June which they also won by 25 points to 15 with Gardiner scoring 3 tries. This was the final match of the tour. Overall the tour was regarded as somewhat of a failure, especially compared to previous New Zealand Māori rugby league tours. As a result, the crowds dwindled and financially the tour lost money.

=== Application for reinstatement and Bay of Plenty rugby league ===
A month after the last match was played Gardiner applied for reinstatement to rugby. Rugby league was not played in the Bay of Plenty at this time which is where he had returned to. However, the Rotorua Rugby Union declined the application.

Fortunately for Gardiner moves were underway in the Bay of Plenty to establish the league game there thanks largely to the efforts of former New Zealand player George Iles. Gardiner was selected to play for Tauranga against Rotorua on 16 September. The match was the first rugby league game ever played in Tauranga and saw the visiting side win 29–28 with Gardiner scoring a try under the posts after a breakaway.

He was then picked to play for the Bay of Plenty side against a very powerful New South Wales touring side. The match was played at Arawa Park before 2,000 spectators in Rotorua, and Gardiner scored Bay of Plenty's only try in a 29–5 loss. His try was from 30 metres out beating the opposition fullback along the way. His next league match was for Te Puke (their first ever league side), though this time he was playing against Tauranga. Te Puke won by 26 points to 20 in Te Puke. Gardiners final game of the season came in another appearance for Bay of Plenty against the touring Auckland team. The Auckland team won 33–26 on the Tauranga Domain with Gardiner scoring a try, and kicking 2 conversions and a penalty.

=== Fire Brigade club in Auckland ===
After returning to New Zealand Gardiner along with several of his Māori teammates joined the Fire Brigade club and he debuted for them on July 8 against City Rovers.

=== Marist Old Boys and Auckland debut ===
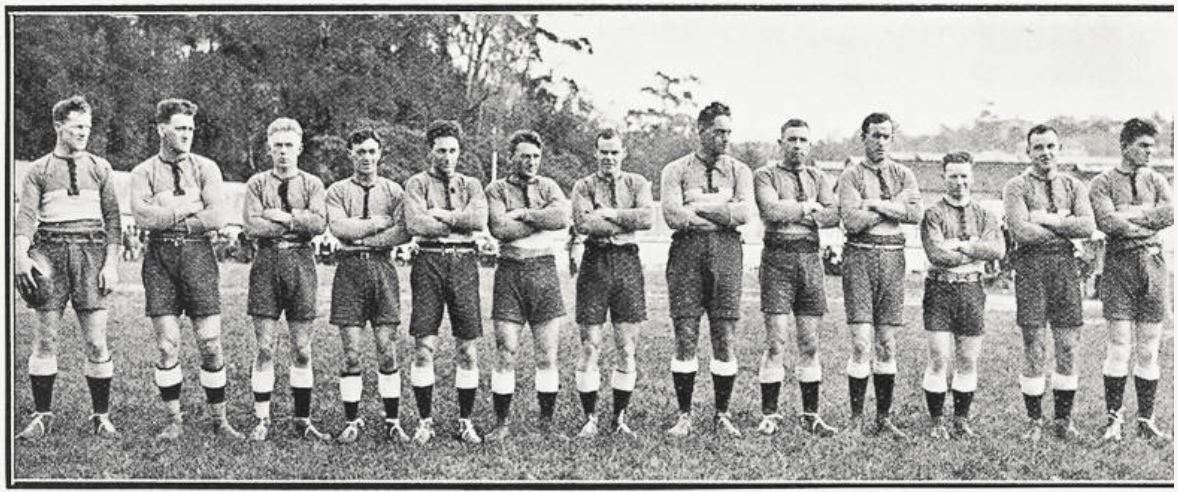
Gardiner, 6th from the right in the Auckland team to play England at Carlaw Park on July 26, 1924.

Unfortunately for Gardiner the league game did not become established in the Bay of Plenty area and the 1923 season saw him playing no football whatsoever. He applied for reinstatement to rugby union again in May 1924 but was turned down once more, though this time by the New Zealand Rugby Union. Gardiner then moved to Auckland and was named to play in the Athletic side for a 24 May game in the Auckland rugby league competition however the match was postponed. There was then mention of him possibly being included in the pack for the Marist Old Boys side against Richmond Rovers, and he did indeed make his debut in this match on 31 May. He was extremely impressive in his early matches for Marist scoring a remarkable 61 points in his first 7 matches. He was picked during this period for Auckland where he played in the second row against the touring England side. Auckland lost 24–11 in front of an enormous crowd of 20,000 at Carlaw Park. Gardiner finished the season scoring 71 points which was the second highest of any player. Marist won the 1924 senior competition defeating Devonport United in the final.

=== Transfer to Ponsonby United ===
The 1925 season was an extremely busy one for Gardiner. He was having financial issues, declaring bankruptcy and blaming Marist for not meeting promises they made that led to him coming to Auckland. Gardiner had three children by this point and the Auckland Star detailed his statement to the office of the Official Signee on 17 March. There was then talk of him moving to the Ponsonby United club prior to the season starting. A transfer was then put in but not initially granted before it was eventually approved on 13 May, although it was erroneously reported as a transfer to Devonport United in the newspaper.

There he played 14 games including the finals of both the Roope Rooster and Stormont Shield with both matches resulting in wins. In an 8 August match against Athletic, Gardiner scored 3 tries and kicked 7 conversions for 23 individual points which was a record individual points haul in Auckland club league to this point.

During the season he also made 3 appearances for Auckland against New Zealand, South Auckland, and then New Zealand again, where he scored 3 tries and kicked 1 conversion in total. He then played for the Auckland Provincial team against the touring Queensland side on 10 October.

=== New Zealand debut ===
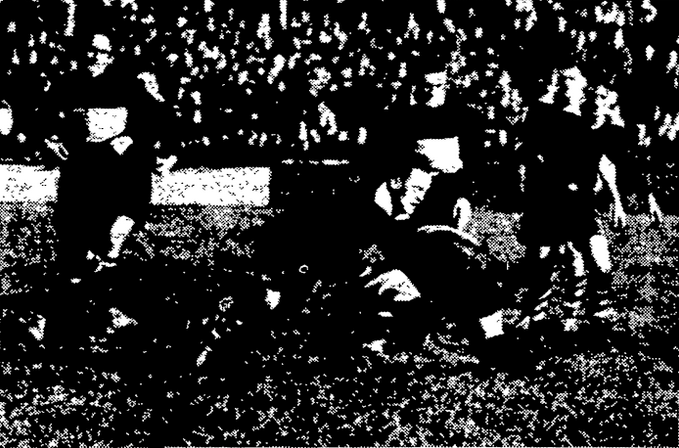
Gardiner on the left watching Stan Webb tackle a Ponsonby teammate.

The 1926 season saw Gardiner selected for the New Zealand team to tour England and Wales. He played 7 matches for Ponsonby and was then picked to play for an ‘A Team’ as part of a series of New Zealand trial matches. He kicked 6 conversions in a 30–28 win for his side, and then came on as an injury replacement for the New Zealand Possible side who played immediately afterwards.

Gardiner was then named in the New Zealand side and prior to their departure he made his debut for New Zealand against Auckland. New Zealand did not take the match seriously and lost 52–32 with Gardiner kicking 3 conversions.

==== New Zealand tour of England and Wales ====
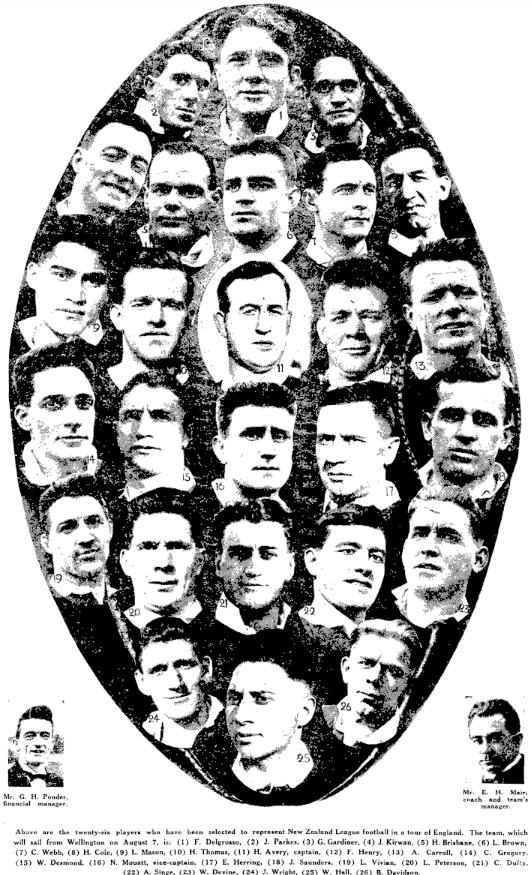
The NZ team to tour England and Wales with George Gardiner in the top row on the right.

On 3 August the New Zealand team departed on board the Aorangi. They travelled to Suva, Fiji where an exhibition match was played before moving on to Hawaii. During that part of the voyage three of the Māori players on tour (Gardiner, Lou Brown, and Craddock Dufty) dressed in traditional Māori costume for a fancy dress ball onboard and were the "hit of the evening. Their effort evoked one continuous roar of laughter from the passengers". When in Hawaii the team held canoe races with a crew led by Gardiner comprising himself, Stan Webb, Frank Delgrosso, Alphonsus Carroll winning.

After arriving in England, he played in the first tour match on 11 September against Dewsbury which New Zealand won 13–9 with Gardiner's play described as being "excellent". A crowd of 16,000 had been on hand to watch the match at Dewsbury's Crown Flatt stadium ground with Gardiner leading the haka. Gardiner who was playing on the wing was said to have "proved a strong-running wing and handled and kicked well all day". At one point he made a good run and crossed the try line but could not pull up fast enough before crossing the dead ball line in the very short in goal areas. Gardiner then played in New Zealand's 23–16 win over Leigh on 15 September. He was once again on the wing and scored two tries after finishing off "excellent pieces of concerted play". The first came after Ben Davidson put in a strong run before sending on a pass to Gardiner who went over in the corner. The second came after Gardiner made a strong fending run down the touch line and eventually received the ball back from Davidson to score again. Three days later Gardiner again found himself on the win for their match against Halifax. However, this time New Zealand lost, by the score of 19–13.

Gardiner wouldn't play again until 6 October when he scored 12 of New Zealand's 19 points in a 19–11 win over York. He scored a try, kicked 3 conversions, and 2 penalties. His try was the final one for New Zealand and his goal kicking was a flawless 5 from 5. His try was described as "the finest try [to that point] on the tour, and [his was] admitted by Yorkites to be the best individual wing effort they had seen on their ground". He received the ball "on the touch line at halfway, raced down at top speed, brushing all opposition and scoring a magnificent try". Gardiner led the haka before their match with Warrington on 9 October but New Zealand played poorly and went down 17–5 with Gardiner converting New Zealand's only try by Len Mason. He again kicked a solitary conversion in New Zealand's easy win over Bramley on 13 October. They won 35–12 in front of 2,000 spectators.

Around this point of the tour it became marred by several players, predominantly forwards going on strike. They refused to play under the coaching and managing of Ernest Mair due to his selections, coaching methods and other financial and management issues from very early in the tour. As a result, several backs had to move into the forwards and Gardiner was one of these partly due to his size. He was alongside Ernie Herring and Bert Avery in a "meritorious" win over Hull on 13 October by 15 points to 13 with a last minute conversion winning the match. Hull had not lost at home for 25 matches. He was again in the forwards for the match with Oldham on 23 October which was lost 15–10. It was commented on in the New Zealand Herald the strangeness with the selections with Gardiner and now Dufty being picked in the forwards ahead of other forwards who were not playing. The news of the fall out between some players and management had not reached the New Zealand shores. Gardiner played in the second row for the next three matches against Leeds (27 October), St Helens (30 October), and Salford (3 November). Leeds were defeated 13–11 with Gardiner involved in some passing which led to a try to Ben Davidson. New Zealand then lost to St Helens 28 to 14. Gardiner scored a try in the win over Salford by 18 points to 10. He played despite "still suffering" from influenza but was rested after this to help him recover more fully. In December a letter was received in Auckland by an Auckland member of the touring side complaining about selections and he specifically mentioned how Gardiner "has been up in the forwards, and has proved the right man in the right place for the ‘mixed stuff’ that has to be faced in some of these game".

Gardiner's next game was against Wigan Highfield on 17 November where he found himself back on the wing with many of the striking forwards now back playing. He scored two tries in a 14–2 win. His first try came after a scrum where the ball reached him via Jack Kirwan and he scored in the corner after "using his weight to his advantage". His second came after he fell on a kick in the in goal from Wally Desmond. On 20 November Gardiner was part of the side defeated by Batley 19–17. He set up a try in "atrocious" conditions due to "heavy rain and a wet ground" scored by Frank Henry. He then scored an unconverted try which had given New Zealand a 15–14 lead at the halftime break.

The match against St Helens saw Gardiner involved in a remarkable incident. New Zealand lost 22–12 with Gardiner scoring a try. However, the match was marked by the sending off of Gardiner after he struck the touch judge near the end of the match. Gardiner admitted striking the blow and said it was due to the touch judge using an insulting expression with the touch judge refusing to make a statement. When interviewed later Gardiner said "the touch judge signalled a try when Ellaby crossed. I disagreed and said so. The judge said: Keep your eyes open, you dirty dago’. I lost my temper and struck him". The Daily Mail then reported that Gardiner "was disinclined to leave the field, but eventually he and the referee went off arm in arm amid cheers". Gardiner played 3 days later on 11 December against Wigan with New Zealand losing heavily by 36 points to 15 in front of 8,000 spectators. Four days later a hearing was held into Gardiner's earlier sending off and he was suspended by the English Rugby League for three matches.

After his suspension ended Gardiner again appeared on the wing for New Zealand in a 32–8 win over Broughton Rangers on 27 December. This was followed by a 29–24 win over Wakefield Trinity on just a day later on 28 December before a crowd of 7,000. Gardiner scored a try in a team performance described as the "best display of attacking seen in Wakefield for a long time". This was followed on New Years Day with a 20–15 loss to Hull Kingston Rovers before 8,000 spectators with Gardiner again on the wing. Gardiner's penultimate match of the tour was against Cumberland and saw New Zealand win 18–3. He scored a try and kicked 2 conversions and a penalty giving him a tour haul of 10 tries and 10 goals from what was to end up at 20 appearances. He had been moved back into the second row, because there had been more trouble between the same group of players and coach Mair. His final match of the tour was against England in the third and final test. New Zealand had lost the first two tests and they would again lose, going down 32–17 with Gardiner in the second row. It was played in wet weather with 8,000 in attendance in Leeds on 18 January.

=== Continuation with Ponsonby ===
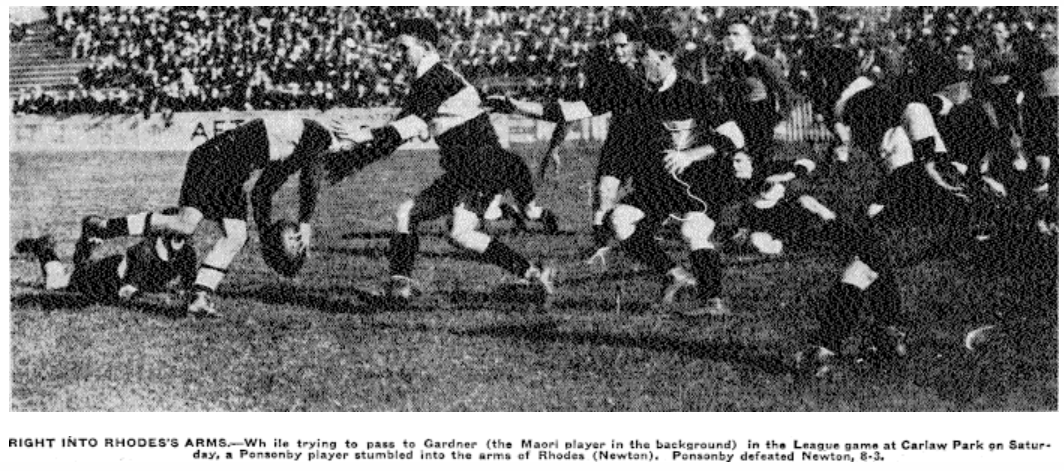
Ponsonby v Newton on May 4, 1929. Gardiner is approaching in the background.

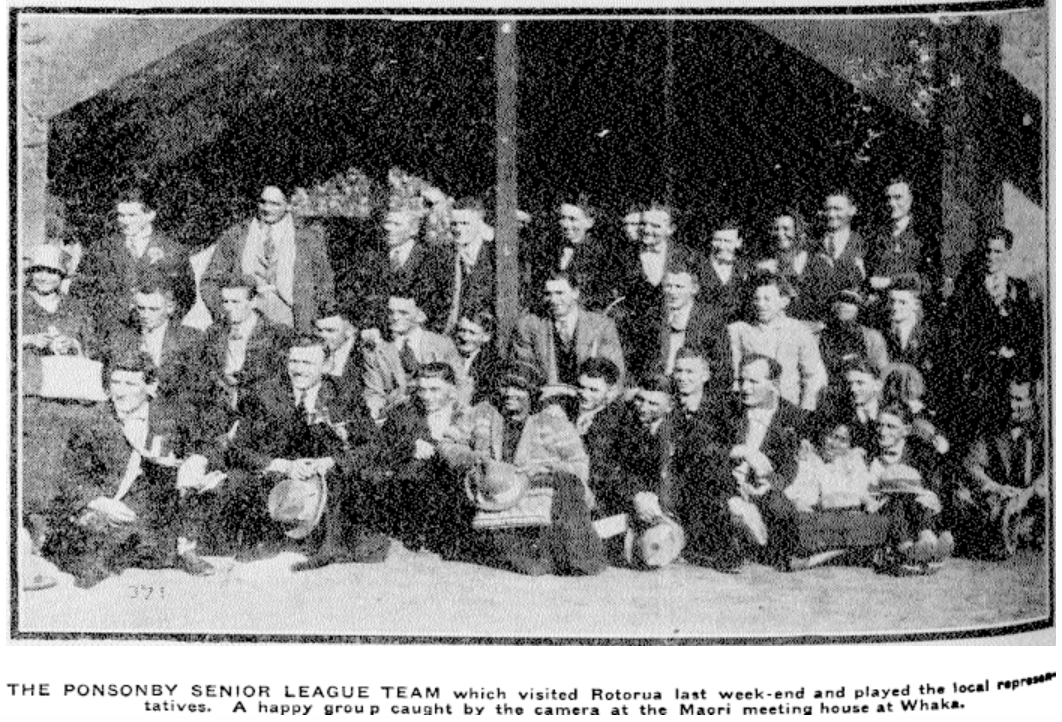
Gardiner in the back row, second from left, with the Ponsonby side which toured Rotorua mid season.

After returning to New Zealand the returning members of the side who were from Auckland played a match against an Auckland side. The match at Carlaw Park saw the returning NZ players go down 24–21 with Gardiner kicking a penalty before a crowd of 14,000. He then resumed his playing career at Ponsonby United and played 16 matches for them including in the championship final against Newton Rangers which they lost 6–3. He scored 6 tries and kicked 13 goals for 44 points total over that 1927 season which meant he was the third highest scorer. In 1928 he played 14 matches for Ponsonby, scoring 6 tries and kicking 3 goals.

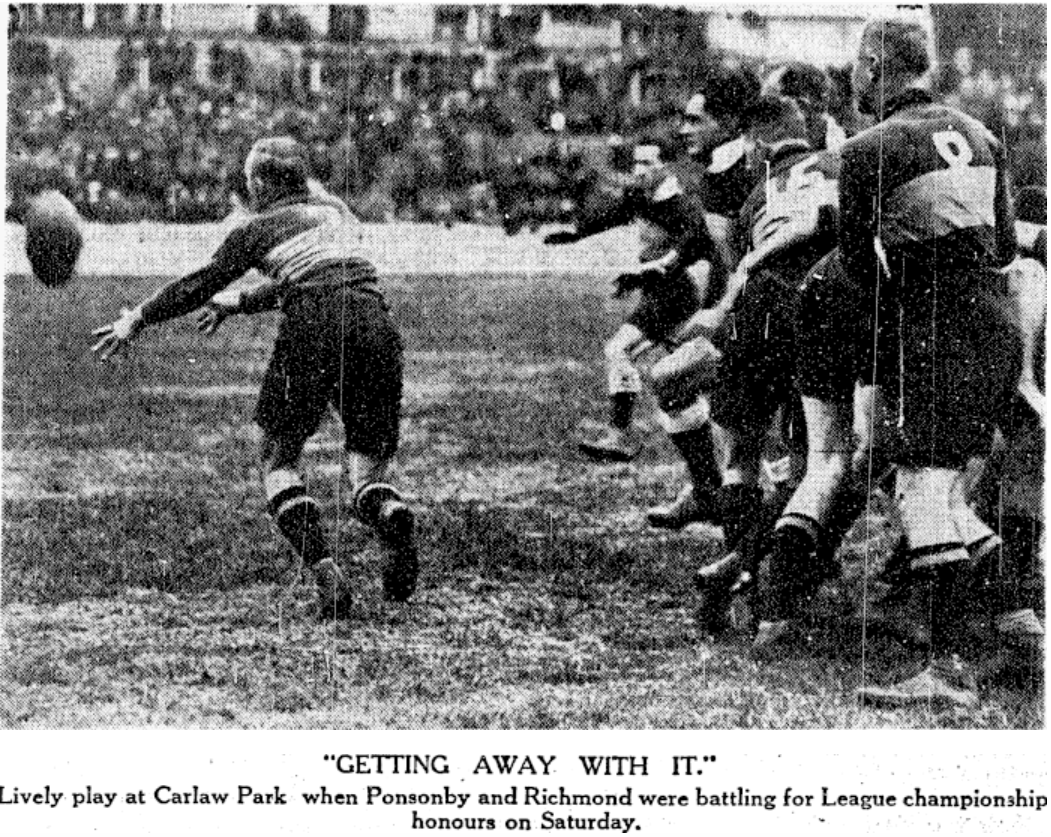
Gardiner emerging from a scrum in Ponsonby's game against Richmond on May 26, 1928.

It was notable by this point that he was no longer being selected for representative football. In 1929 he played 16 matches for Ponsonby scoring 3 tries and kicking 5 goals.

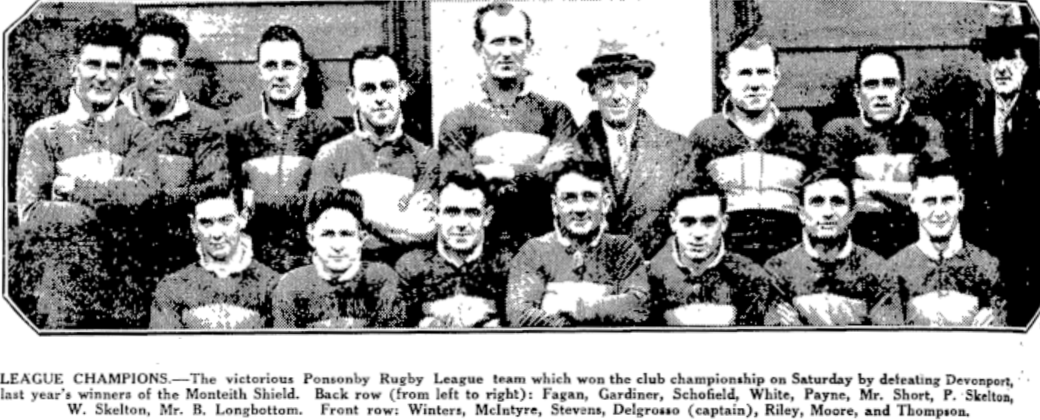
The Ponsonby side which won the championship. Gardiner is standing in the back row, second from left.

One of his tries came in the championship final when his Ponsonby side defeated Devonport United by 5 points to 0 before a crowd of 11,000. He also played in the side which lost the Roope Rooster final to Marist Old Boys 17–9 and the side which lost to Marist 28–14 in the Stormont Shield final. In October the South Sydney side toured New Zealand and Gardiner taught them a haka whilst on a picnic with the team which was said to mean they were "the first Sydney team to possess a Māori war cry". The 1930 season was to be Gardiner's last full season for Ponsonby but it was one of his more successful ones with them. He played 15 matches and scored 2 tries and kicked 3 goals. He was part of the team which comfortably won the championship and then defeated Richmond Rovers 15–7 to win the Roope Rooster with Gardiner scoring a try.

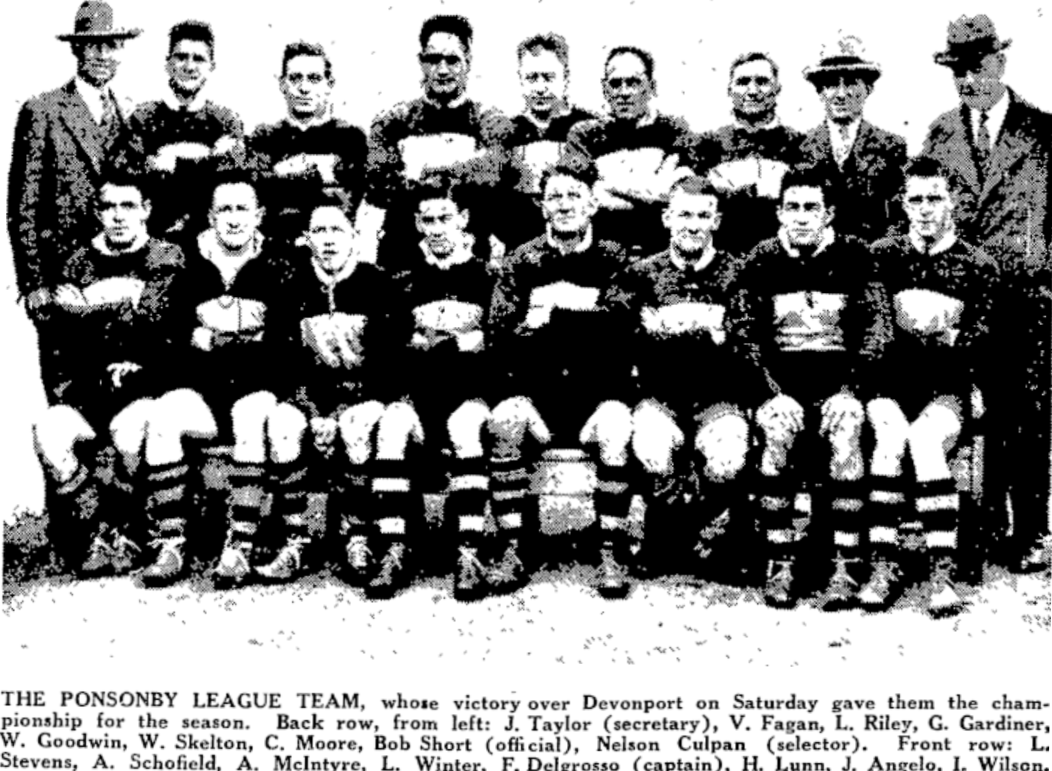
The Ponsonby United side which won the 1930 championship. Gardiner is standing, 4th from the left.

They then went down to Devonport United 17–5 in the final of the Stormont Shield. Their final match of the season was in a provincial ‘club championship’ match with the winners of the South Auckland competition, Ngaruawahia with Ponsonby winning 32–29 and Gardiner scoring a try. In 1931 Gardiner just played 2 matches for Ponsonby after there had earlier been doubts that he would play at all. Then on 15 July he turned out for the Waterside Workers team in the midweek competition which was played between various business league teams. He ultimately played for them at least six times and scored 2 tries and kicked 5 goals including 1 in their final win over Stonex and Stormont. He was then drawn back into the Ponsonby side to play their Roope Rooster semi-final with Richmond Rovers which saw them win 28–20 after extra-time. Followed by the final where he scored a try in a 34–17 loss. His final ever appearances for Ponsonby came at the end of the 1932 when he was pulled into the side again for their Roope Rooster round 1 match with Newton Rangers which they won 36 to 10 with Gardiner scoring 2 tries. He then travelled to New Plymouth to play Devonport United in an exhibition match at Pukekura Park. The match was drawn 28–28 with Gardiner scoring a try in what was to be the final ever official football match of his career.

== Professional wrestling career ==
=== New Zealand matches ===
In 1931 Gardiner had begun professional wrestling. On 14 July he wrestled E.A. Brown, the amateur heavyweight of Wellington in a three-minute round fight which resulted in a draw at the Auckland Town Hall. Gardiner was said to weigh 15 stone. In August 1932 he wrestled Limutkin a Russian wrestler, and Ike Robin. He was defeated in both bouts but "was responsible for a very creditable display".

=== Move to Australia to wrestle ===
In 1933 Gardiner had moved to Australia to embark on a more serious professional wrestling career. By this stage he was around 35 years of age. He was wrestling under the name of “George Tiki” or “Hori Tiki”. In a February 27 bout with Tom Lurich of Poland he lost by two falls to one in five rounds of wrestling at Leichhardt Stadium. Then in June he lost to fellow New Zealander Charlie Pollard. In July he fought “Nugget” Potaka in Queensland and it was described as featuring “such and amount of horseplay, frivolity and synthetic roughness that the police stopped the bout”. Then on October 3 he wrestled George Pencheff of Bulgaria in Perth and lost by two falls to one. Pencheff weighed in at 97.5 kilograms while “Tiki” was 93.4 kilograms. Then he fought Leon Labriola in Perth on November 26 in an “all-in wrestling match at the stadium after the latter had refused to shake hands. Tiki then attacked Labriola with his bare fists, but the fight was stopped by the police”. His next fight was against Ali Bey in Perth and he lost failing “to break his very persistent run of bad luck”. In July he wrestled the Chinese-American fighter Wong Buck Cheong who weighed in at 14st 3lb. Near the end of the fight Tiki stopped wrestling and was merely warding off Cheong. It was later discovered that he had broken a rib. He did however win the fight after both wrestlers had earlier won a fall but Tiki was the stronger overall. He fought Billy Meeske in September at Fitzroy Stadium and by this time his weight had increased significantly to 102.5 kilograms. They battled to a draw in a match described as a “wild ten-round contest and resulted in a draw after the Māori had exercised his right to demand two extra rounds, each man securing a fall”. The match was unpopular with Sydney patrons with “the throwing of pennies into the ring”. In March 1939 he fought Fred Atkins at Leichhardt Stadium and lost after crashing through the ropes in the fifth round. He hit his head on the press benches and was injured badly enough where he was unable to continue fighting. Then in late June he fought King (Kingsley) Elliot of Auckland (though he had been living in the USA) in an exhibition described as “fast, open, and scientific” at the City Hall in Hobart. Tiki won the eight round fight after forcing Elliot to submit with a “crucifix” hold in the seventh round before the judges awarded him the fight at its conclusion.

== World War II and death ==
Following the outbreak of World War II, Gardiner, now aged over 40, enlisted in the Australian Forces. He was part of the Australian 2/23rd Battalion. He left Australia for the Middle East in November 1940. In early 1941 a German advance in Libya pushed British and Commonwealth forces back towards the Egyptian border. In early May the Germans captured part of Tobruk’s outer area and this area became known as the Salient. In “the early hours of 17 May the 2/23rd Battalion participated in an unsuccessful attempt to recapture the lost ground”. They made some gains but ultimately most of the Australian attacking forces were forced back and they suffered heavy casualties. After the operation there were 95 Australians reported missing including Gardiner amongst six other officers. There were conflicting reports of what had happened to him including him being taken to a hospital in Egypt, or that he had been captured. It was later determined after an inquiry that he had been shot “through the abdomen and died of his wounds the day after the battle”. His death occurred in fighting at Cyrenaica near Tobruk with the cause of death recorded as peritonitis. George Gardiner was buried in the Knightsbridge War Cemetery in Acroma, 30 km (19 mi) west of Tobruk in Libya.

On May 13, 1942, the Bay of Plenty Times published an obituary for George Gardiner. On 10 April 2016 the Australian War Memorial held a ceremony to commemorate Lieutenant George Gardiner's life and service.

== Personal life ==
Gardiner married Mere (Mary) Anna Whitaker (1901–84). They had seven children; Darcy Herbert Gardiner (1922–64), Patrick Gardiner (1927–?), George Augustine Gardiner (1930–2006), Rew Patricia Gardiner (?–1933), Ngaroma Agnes Gardiner, Susie Glady Gardiner, and Mary Cecilia Gardiner (?–1995).
