= Charlie Carr (rugby league) =

GB & England international rugby league footballer

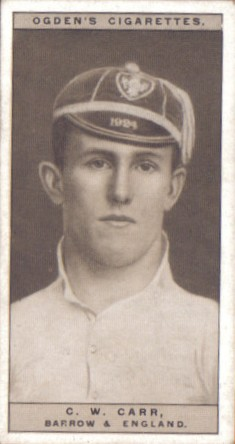
- Ogden's Cigarette card featuring Charles Carr

Personal information
- Full name: Charles William Carr
- Born: 1903 East Riding of Yorkshire, England
- Died: 13 December 1959 (aged 56) Barrow-in-Furness, England

Playing information
- Position: Wing, Centre
Club
Years	Team	Pld	T	G	FG	P
1922–34	Barrow	396	61	45		570
Representative
Years	Team	Pld	T	G	FG	P
≥1922–≤34	Lancashire	16	15	3
1924–28	England	7	9	0	0	27
1924–26	Great Britain	7	6	0	0	18

Charles "Charlie" William Carr (1903 – 13 December 1959) was an English professional rugby league footballer who played in the 1920s and 1930s. He played at representative level for Great Britain, England and Lancashire (despite having been born in the East Riding of Yorkshire, England, he was playing his rugby in Barrow-in-Furness, Lancashire), and at club level for Askam ARLFC and Barrow, as a wing or centre.

== Playing career ==
=== Career records ===
As of 2011, Carr is fifth in Barrow's all time try scorers list with 161-tries. He is an inductee to the club's Hall of Fame.

=== International honours ===
Carr won caps for England while at Barrow in 1924 against Other Nationalities, in 1925 against Wales (2 matches), in 1926 against Wales, and Other Nationalities, in 1927 against Wales, in 1928 against Wales, and won caps for Great Britain while at Barrow in 1924 against Australia (2 matches), and New Zealand (2 matches), in 1926–27 against New Zealand (3 matches).
