= 1921 Auckland Rugby League season =

The 1921 season of Auckland Rugby League was its 13th. Seventy two teams played across its six main grades.

Preceded by 1920	13th Auckland Rugby League season 1921	Succeeded by 1922

The first grade competition featured seven teams, City Rovers, Marist Old Boys, Maritime, Devonport, Fire Brigade (formerly Grafton Athletic), Newton Rangers, and Ponsonby United. City Rovers comfortably won the senior championship for the 4th time with a 8 win, 1 draw, 0 loss record ahead of Maritime who were unable to repeat their title win from the previous season. City had previously won the title in 1910, 1911, and 1916. This was to be the first of 3 consecutive titles for them. They also won the Roope Rooster knockout competition for the 3rd time after previous wins in 1916 and 1918.

== News ==
=== Club teams by grade participation ===
Team	1st Grade	2nd Grade	3rd Grade	4th Grade	5th Grade	6th Grade A	6th Grade B	Total
Marist Old Boys	1	1	1	0	3	0	1	7
Ponsonby United	1	1	1	1	1	0	1	6
City Rovers	1	1	0	1	1	1	1	6
Maritime	1	1	0	1	0	1	1	5
Manukau Rovers	0	1	0	1	1	1	1	5
Devonport United	1	1	1	0	1	0	0	4
Kingsland Rovers	0	0	1	1	1	0	1	4
Richmond Rovers	0	0	0	1	1	1	1	4
Newton Rangers	1	1	1	0	0	0	0	3
Ellerslie United	0	1	1	0	0	0	0	2
Otahuhu Rovers	0	1	0	1	0	0	1	3
Northcote & Birkenhead Ramblers	0	1	0	0	1	0	0	2
Takapuna	0	0	0	0	1	1	0	2
Parnell	0	0	0	0	0	1	1	2
Fire Brigade (Grafton Athletic)	1	0	0	0	0	0	0	1
Point Chevalier	0	0	1	0	0	0	0	1
Māngere Rangers	0	0	0	0	1	0	0	1
Total	7	10	7	7	12	6	9	58

=== Junior Management Committee ===
The Junior management committee elected for the season was: G. Stevens, W. Church, J. Ball, H. Clayton, W. Dowle, A.E. Smith, W. Lusty, W.J. Davidson (Hon. Sec), T. Fielding (Chairman), J. Aggers, K. Lippiatt.

=== Club name changes and mergers ===
On 13 April the Management Committee of the Auckland Rugby League met. At the meeting Grafton was granted permission to change its name to "Fire Brigade Club". Devonport United notified the league that the Devonport Borough Council had allocated the Devonport Domain for its use. During the season the club was named 'North Shore' and 'Devonport' interchangeably by both The New Zealand Herald and the Auckland Star. In 1920 the club had seen a merger between North Shore Albions and the Sunnyside club and agreed on the name Devonport United but it appears that the stronger club's name was still more favoured by those reporting on the games, and it was eventually the name adopted by the club. While the Kingsland Rovers club wrote asking for advice on what it should do regarding a ground for the club to play at.

=== Carlaw Park open for business ===
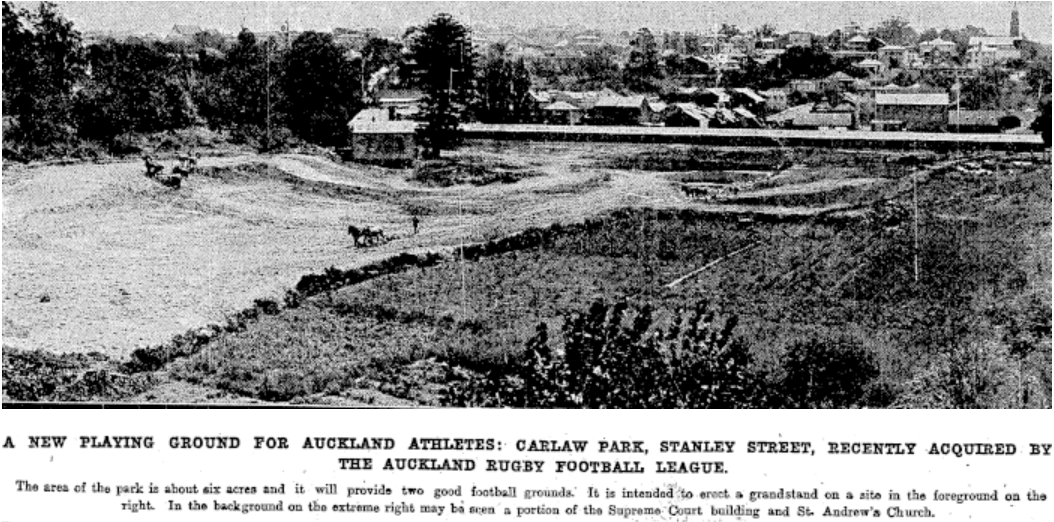
The site of Carlaw Park prior to construction of the ground beginning.

Carlaw Park was named after James Carlaw who had been heavily involved in the development of rugby league in the Auckland area for many years. History was made on 25 June when the first ever match was played on Carlaw Park between City Rovers and Maritime. The match was won by City Rovers 10 points to 8. Prior to the match an official opening ceremony was held. "The park was declared open by Hon. Arthur Myers, MP. Mr and Mrs. Carlaw were each presented with a gold badge and certificate of life membership on the ground, and at the conclusion of the ceremony Mrs Carlaw kicked off for the first game on the new park".

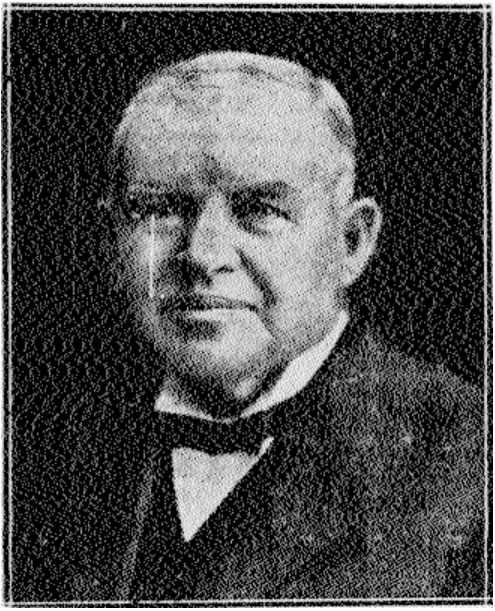
James Carlaw, who Carlaw Park was named after.

City Rovers capped their season by winning the Thacker Shield from Ponsonby United on the final day of the season after having already won the Monteith Shield by winning the First Grade Championship, and the Roope Rooster Knock-out trophy.

=== Female football club denied by the league ===
On 12 July a meeting was held in Parnell to form a "girls" rugby league competition with over 40 enrolling. They were to play a game on Carlaw Park on the following Saturday afternoon. They were all aged between 16 and 20 years of age. The chairman of the Parnell club, Mr. A.R. Turner explained "that it wished to develop the girls as well as the men, and to this end the club was being formed at the suggestion of the girls". A trophy "similar to the Monteith Shield" had been donated, and "members of the Auckland League Management Committee had donated a football, and were providing assistance in supplying jerseys. At the meeting when the time for enrollment came it was described that "they rose in a body and fairly rushed the table, which was in danger of being overturned in the excitement of the moment" Ivan Culpan, secretary of the league told the girls that the league would train them every evening in the lead up to the match. Over the next week the number of girls enrolled increased to 65. It later transpired that the members of the Auckland Rugby League who had attended had done so by invitation and were not necessarily acting on behalf of the league with the comments they had made. At the Auckland Rugby league Management meeting the following night the decision on whether to support the girls playing and affiliate the club with the league was deferred. Both George Hunt and E Phelan spoke against allowing the girls to play. And at a meeting on 20 July the Auckland Rugby League decided to oppose the girls playing football. Mr. James Carlaw said that medical opinion was in opposition to females playing the sport. Mr Stallworthy and Mr. E. Feilding suggested a trial game with modified rules take place with doctors watching but the request was declined.

=== Arthur Singe switches to rugby league ===
At the beginning of the season Marist Old Boys enticed Arthur Singe to join the club. He was an outstanding rugby player playing in the wing-forward position (flanker in today's terms). He played for the New Zealand Army rugby team which toured Great Britain and then South Africa at the end of the war. When he returned to New Zealand he played for the Marist rugby club and played for Auckland 8 teams. He narrowly missed the New Zealand rugby team to tour Australia after playing just 10 minutes in the North Island v South Island match which acted as a trial of sorts. He switched codes and joined Marist, playing for them in 1921–22 and 1925–26 before going on tour with the New Zealand team on their ill-fated tour of England. Seven players went on strike due to issues with management on the tour and were ultimately banned for life. Singe was the only Auckland player among the strikers. The ban was lifted in 1962, 26 years after his death in 1936. Singe was to play 48 games for Marist scoring 148 points, 15 games for Auckland scoring 25 points, and 8 matches for New Zealand.

== Monteith Shield (first grade championship) ==
=== Monteith Shield standings ===
Team	Pld	W	D	L	F	A	Pts
City Rovers	9	8	1	0	241	50	17
Maritime	9	6	0	3	126	112	12
Marist Old Boys	9	5	0	4	158	122	10
Ponsonby United	9	5	0	4	129	99	10
Newton Rangers	9	3	1	5	74	129	7
Devonport United	7	1	0	6	54	132	2
Fire Brigade	8	1	0	7	41	179	2

=== Statistics ===
Including the knockout games there were 38 first grade games played with 239 tries, 110 conversions, 31 penalties, 3 drop goals, and 4 goals from a mark. The average number of points per game was 26.7, an increase of 1.7 points from the previous season. There were 6.3 tries per game, compared to 5.8 the previous season. With 110 conversions from 239 attempts the successful percentage was only 46.

=== Monteith Shield fixtures ===
==== Round 1 ====
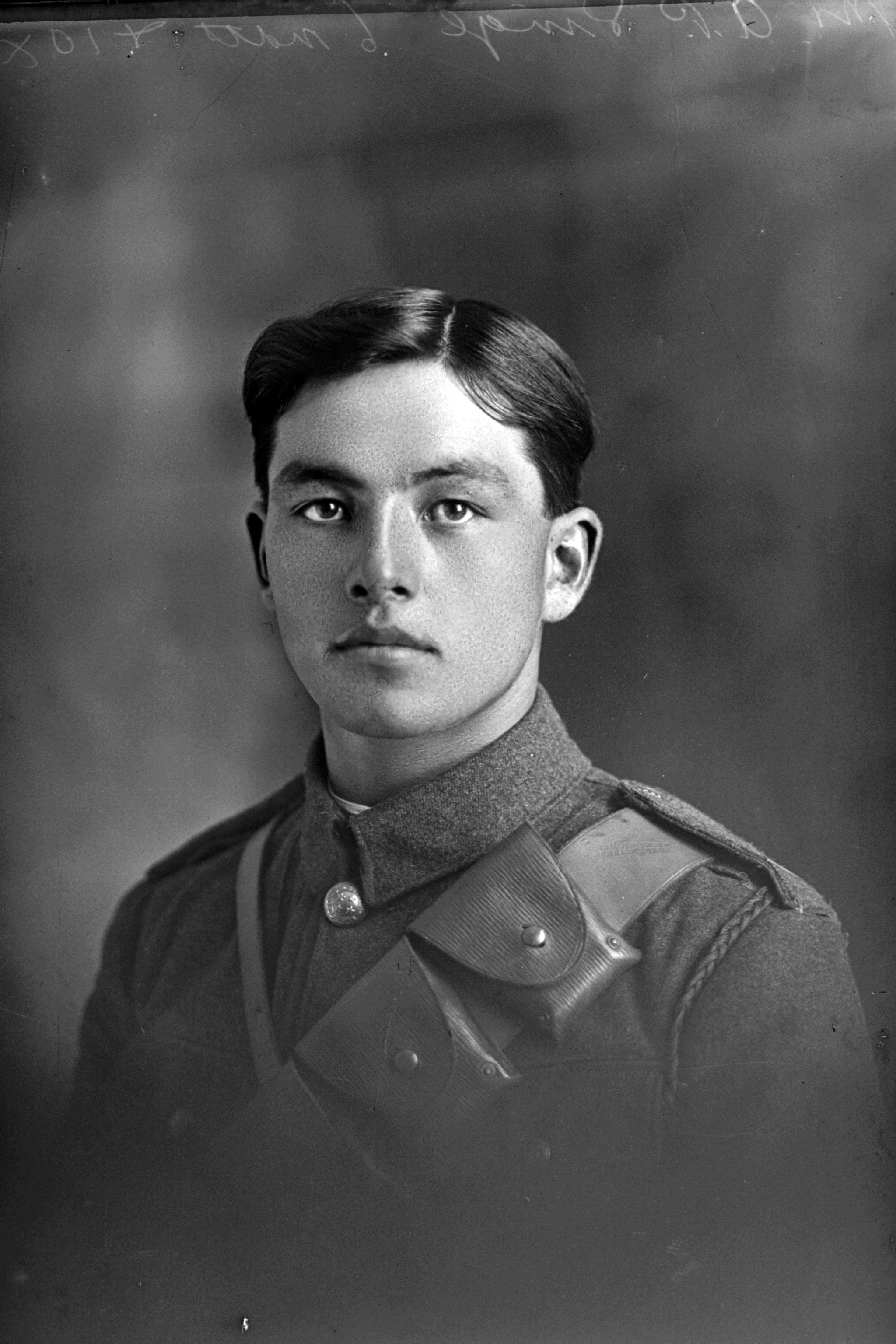
Arthur Singe

Arthur Singe debuted for Marist. His mother was Irish and father Chinese, making him one of the first ever players of Asian heritage in New Zealand representative rugby league along with James Hing who played in the same era for Marist and later coached Point Chevalier. Singe had played for the New Zealand Army rugby union team during World War 1. Singe narrowly missed out on selection for the All Blacks in 1920 after playing for the North Island in a trial match and soon after switched to rugby league. He was a loose forward and went on to play rugby league for Auckland and New Zealand. On the 1926-27 tour of England he was one of several players who boycotted matches due to a disagreement with the coach/manager and was suspended for several matches. Following the tour he was banned for life by the New Zealand Rugby League. In 1962 the New Zealand Rugby League lifted the ban on Singe and his 6 teammates. However by this time 4 of the 6 players had already passed away including Singe who died in 1936.

23 April	City	22–5	Marist	Victoria Park 1
3:00	Try: Alf Townsend, Bill Davidson, Bert Laing, Harry Hawkes; Con: Bill Davidson 4 Pen: Bill Davidson		Try: Bill Stormont; Pen: Bill Stormont 1 mark	Attendance: 6,000; Referee: Bill Murray

23 April	Devonport	3–2	Fire Brigade	Victoria Park 2
3:00	Try: J Price		Pen: Charles Woolley	Attendance: 6,000; Referee: Clayton

23 April	Newton	13–3	Ponsonby	Auckland Domain
3:00	Try: Bill Cloke, Clarrie Polson, Leonard Newdick; Con: Craddock Dufty 2		Try: William Edwards	Referee: Walter Ripley

==== Round 2 ====
30 April	City	33–2	Maritime	Auckland Domain 1
3:00	Try: Ben Davidson 2, Bert Laing 2, Tim Peckham, Vic Thomas, Alf Townsend; Con: Bill Davidson 5 Pen: Bill Davidson 1 mark		Pen: Eric Grey	Attendance: 7,500; Referee: Archie Ferguson

30 April	Newton	16–10	Devonport	Auckland Domain 2
3:00	Try: Thomas Virtue, Arthur James, Wally Somers, Unknown x 1 Con: Craddock Dufty; Pen: Craddock Dufty		Try: Alf Scott, D Doran; Con: E Johnson 2	Attendance: 7,500; Referee: Walter Ripley

30 April	Marist	43–8	Fire Brigade	Auckland Domain 3
3:00	Try: Arthur Eustace, Arthur Singe, Unknown x 7 Con: Bill Stormont, Unknown x 6 Pen: Bill Stormont		Try: R Coates, Unknown x 1 Con: Charles Woolley	Attendance: 7,500; Referee: Frank Thompson

==== Round 3 ====
An enormous crowd of 6,000 attended the Marist v Newton match which was somewhat of a surprise as Marist were relatively new in the grade and had only won one of their two opening matches. The game was delayed 20 minutes as officials took that amount of time to clear the #2 field at Victoria Park of spectators. At halftime Newton led 5-4 and as the #1 field was now empty the second half was moved to that field. With 12 minutes remaining Newton still led 5-4 but Percy Gallagher of the Marist side scored a try, converted by Arthur Singe to put them in the lead. Remarkably the same pairing repeated the feat twice more to take a 19-5 lead before Arthur Eustace ran 75 yards to secure the win with the crowd pouring on to the field amidst the action.

7 May	Ponsonby	17–10	Devonport	Auckland Domain 1
3:00	Try: Dougie McGregor, R Mitchell, William Edwards, Bill Walsh, Eric McGregor; Con: Thomas McClymont		Try: J Johnston, Harry Wynn; Con: E Johnston; Pen: E Johnston	Attendance: 2,000; Referee: Mann

7 May	Maritime	17–5	Fire Brigade	Auckland Domain 2
3:00	Try: George Yardley, Eric Grey 2, Woods, W Miller; Con: Eric Grey		Try: S Dunn; Pen: Albert Ivil	Attendance: 2,000; Referee: Len Farrant

7 May	Marist	22–15	Newton	Victoria Park 2 & 1
3:00	Try: Arthur Eustace, Percy Gallagher 3 Con: Arthur Singe 3 Pen: Bill Stormont, Arthur Singe		Try: Arthur James, Leonard Newdick, Bill Cloke; Con: Craddock Dufty 2 Pen: Craddock Dufty	Attendance: 6,000; Referee: T Hill

==== Round 4 ====
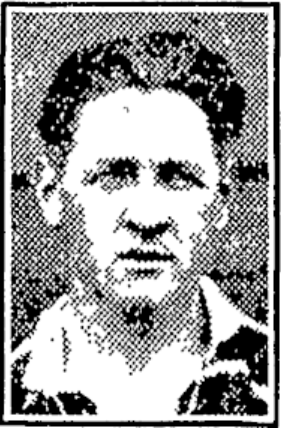
Ivan Littlewood

Ivan Littlewood debuted for Maritime and scored a try in their 12-10 win over Newton. He went on to represent Auckland 22 times from 1921 to 1927 and played for New Zealand in 1 test match in 1925. He was a consistent try scorer with 80 tries from 120 club games from 1921 to 1934 and finished with 12 tries this season which made him the unofficial top try scorer. City accumulated one of the highest ever scores in this era in the first grade competition with their 61 to 7 victory over Fire Brigade at the Auckland Domain. Bill Davidson scored a try and converted 11 of their 13 tries which was a record. Two of their tries were scored by his younger brother, Ben Davidson, while Harry Tancred 2, George Reid, V Thomas, Alf Townsend, and Bert Laing were also among the try scorers.

14 May	Maritime	12–10	Newton	Victoria Park 1
3:00	Try: Ivan Littlewood, Ernie Herring, Jim Brien, George Yardley		Try: Wally Somers, Nelson Bass; Con: Craddock Dufty; Pen: Craddock Dufty	Attendance: 6,500; Referee: Walter Ripley

14 May	Ponsonby	35–3	Marist	Devonport Domain 1
3:00	Try: Eric McGregor 2, Bill Walsh, Dougie McGregor, George Mormon 2, William Hanlon, L Martin, Bernard Longbottom; Con: Thomas McClymont 4		Try: Percy Gallagher	Referee: Frank Thompson

14 May	City	61–7	Fire Brigade	Auckland Domain 2
3:00	Try: Harry Tancred 2, George Reid, Ben Davidson 2, Bill Davidson, V Thomas, Alf Townsend, Bert Laing, Unknown x 4 Con: Bill Davidson 11		Try: Charles Woolley; Con: R Coates; Pen: Albert Ivil	Referee: William Mincham

==== Round 5 ====
The match between Marist and Devonport was originally scheduled to be played at the Devonport Domain. However the Marist club protested to the Auckland Rugby League that they had played at that venue the week before and the ground was particularly hard and also that many of their players could not get away from work early enough to travel to the ground and they would likely forfeit. The league sent a delegation to inspect the ground. It was then decided to move the match to the Auckland Domain number 3 field.

28 May	Newton	6–6	City	Auckland Domain 1
3:00	Try: F Lovelock 2		Try: Bill Minogue, Unknown forward x 1	Attendance: 3,000; Referee: A Ball

28 May	Maritime	19–17	Ponsonby	Auckland Domain 2
3:00	Try: Eric Grey, Jim Brien 2, Ivan Littlewood, Unknown x 1 Con: John Lang, Mike Flynn		Try: Dougie McGregor 2, Eric McGregor, Bill Walsh, Unknown x 1 Con: Unknown x 1	Attendance: 3,000; Referee: H Clayton

28 May	Marist	17–9	Devonport	Auckland Domain 3
3:00	Try: Arthur Eustace 3, James (Sonny) Hing, Percy Gallagher; Con: Edmund (Mick) Carroll		Try: A Nelson, Pat Morgan, Cyril Nicholson	Attendance: 3,000; Referee: T Hill

==== Round 6 ====
Round 6 was somewhat farcical. Devonport fielded several juniors and when the score got to 14–0 in favour of Maritime very quickly four Maritime players changed teams to make it a more even contest. The remainder of the game more resembled a practice match. While Newton defaulted their match with Fire Brigade as only 6 players turned out. The New Zealand Herald match report stated that "counter-attractions proving too strong for the Newton players".

4 June	City	24–3	Ponsonby	Victoria Park 2
3:00	Try: Ben Davidson 2, Alf Townsend 2, Tim Peckham, Ernie Mackie; Con: Ernie Mackie, Ben Davidson; Pen: Maurice Wetherill 1 mark		Try: William Hanlon	Attendance: 3,000; Referee: Len Farrant

4 June	Devonport	5–25	Maritime	Devonport Domain 1
3:00	Try: Unknown x 1 Con: Unknown x 1		Try: Unknown x 7 Con: Unknown x 2	Referee: Henning

4 June	Fire Brigade	WBD-LBD	Newton	Auckland Domain 1
3:00				Referee: Walter Ripley

==== Round 7 ====
11 June	Maritime	15–8	Marist	Auckland Domain 1
3:00	Try: Ivan Littlewood 2, George Yardley; Con: Mike Flynn 2 Pen: Eric Grey		Try: James (Sonny) Hing, Arthur Eustace; Con: Bill Stormont	Attendance: 5,500; Referee: A Ball

11 June	Ponsonby	10–8	Fire Brigade	Auckland Domain 2
3:00	Try: George Mormon, L Martin; Con: Dougie McGregor; Pen: Dougie McGregor		Try: H McNeil, J Corfield; Pen: Albert Ivil	Attendance: 5,500; Referee: Frank Thompson

11 June	Devonport	6–37	City	Devonport Domain
3:00	Try: Charles Hand, H Mann		Try: George Reid 2, Ben Davidson 2, Harry Hawkes, Alf Townsend 2, Bill Minogue, Tim Peckham; Con: George Reid, Ben Davidson 3, Bill Minogue	Referee: Walter Ripley

==== Round 8 ====
John Lang, who had switched to rugby union weeks earlier was denied reinstatement in that code. As a result he returned to rugby league and joined the Marist club, making his debut in their game against City. He went on to represent them for 4 seasons and also made several appearances for Auckland while a Marist member. Ernie Herring also formally of the Maritime club had tried to transfer to the Marist rugby union club but instead turned out for the Marist rugby league side. The Auckland Rugby League cleared their transfers before kickoff. Herring scored a try for Marist in their loss to City. For City Ben Davidson scored two tries and the New Zealand Herald referred to him as 'Harley Davidson' in their match report, presumably after the motorcycle which had become popular at the time. One of City's tries was scored by Harry Hawkes who actually lost the ball over the line but he did so after crashing into a spectator who was on the field of play so the referee awarded the try anyway. Spectators crowding on to the field was a constant problem at the Auckland Domain and Victoria Park matches which drew very large crowds and had almost no fencing.

18 June	City	11–8	Marist	Auckland Domain 1
3:00	Try: Ben Davidson 2, Harry Hawkes; Con: Maurice Wetherill		Try: Ernie Herring, Arthur Eustace; Con: Bill Stormont	Attendance: 7,000; Referee: Archie Ferguson

18 June	Newton	6–5	Ponsonby	Victoria Park 2
3:00	Try: A Jones, Leonard Newdick		Try: Artie Rae; Con: Dougie McGregor	Referee: T Hill

==== Round 9 ====
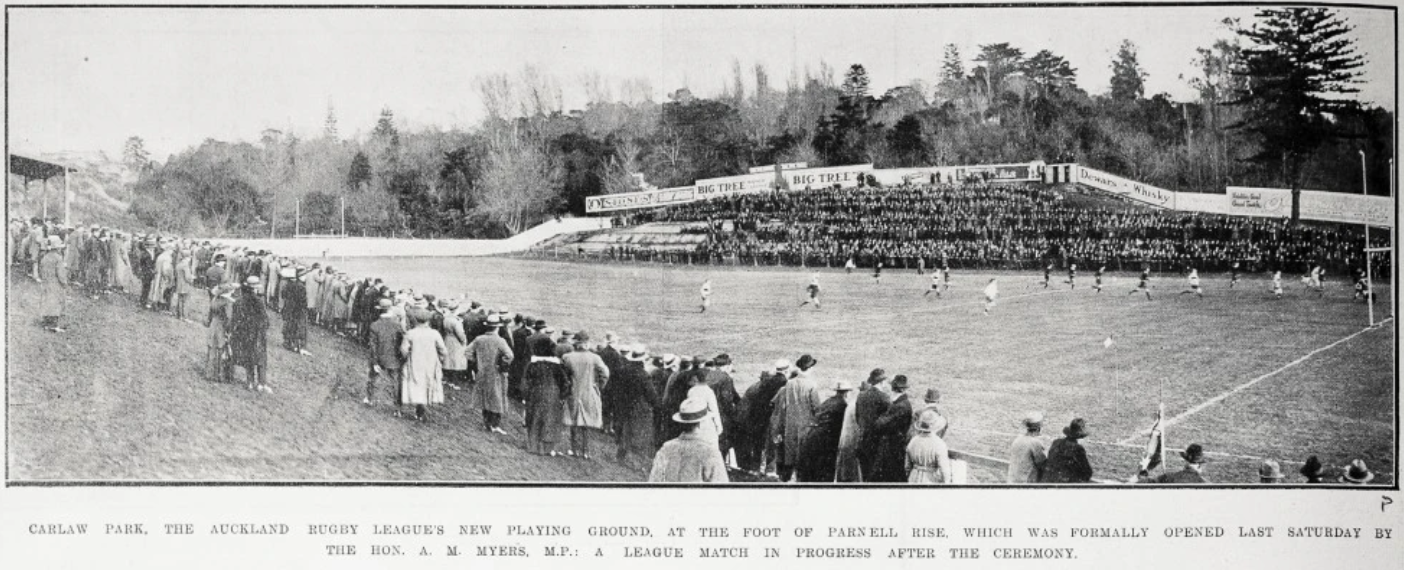
Round 9 saw the opening of Carlaw Park and the first ever match played on its soil. Auckland mayor and Auckland Rugby League president, Arthur Myers officially declared the ground open before 7,000 spectators. James Carlaw and his wife were presented with certificates making them the first two life members of the park. Only one match was played with City Rovers defeating Maritime by 10 points to 8 after overcoming a 0-8 half time deficit. Bert Lunn of the Maritime side had the honour of scoring the first try on the ground. A City player, George Reid was accidentally kicked in the head and was taken to hospital where he was treated for a "minor scalp wound". George Davidson, the New Zealand Olympic sprinter who had run in the 100m and 200m events at the Antwerp Olympics nine months earlier turned out for his Maritime club for the first time this season. He was said to have played very well having "put on weight" and making a couple of "brilliant dashes". The other two matches for this round were postponed. The other game scheduled for Carlaw Park was between Fire Brigade and Marist but the Fire Brigade players "were called to a warehouse fire in the city shortly after mid-day and performed strenuous work suppressing the outbreak". They then arrived late to the ground and so the match was abandoned. The third game was between Newton and Devonport, scheduled for the Devonport Domain. Both captains decided to postpone the match, though the majority of the Devonport players were unaware of this arrangement and arrived at the ground ready to play.

25 June	City	10–8	Maritime	Carlaw Park 1
3:00	Try: Harry Hawkes, Harry Francis; Con: Bill Minogue; Pen: Bill Minogue (1 mark)		Try: Herbert (Herb) Lunn, Ivan Littlewood; Con: Eric Grey	Attendance: 7,000; Referee: Archie Ferguson

25 June	Devonport	PPD	Newton	Devonport Domain
3:00

25 June	Marist	PPD	Fire Brigade	Auckland Domain 2
3:00

==== Round 10 ====
2 July	Marist	34–3	Newton	Carlaw Park 1
3:00	Try: Ernie Herring 2, John Lang, Arthur Singe 2, Puka, Arthur Eustace, Percy Gallagher; Con: Ernie Herring, Bill Stormont, John Lang, Edmund Carroll 2		Try: Charles James	Attendance: 3,700; Referee: T Hill

2 July	Ponsonby	18–11	Devonport	Victoria Park 1
3:00	Try: Dougie McGregor, Ben McGregor, Sam Lowrie, Wilfred McNeil; Con: Dougie McGregor 2 Pen: Dougie McGregor		Try: J Price, Cargill, Alf Townsend; Drop: McAneny	Referee: L Hemming

2 July	Maritime	24–6	Fire Brigade	Auckland Domain 1
3:00	Try: Syd O'Donnell, Ivan Littlewood 3, Bill Ballyntyne, Jack McGregor; Con: Syd O'Donnell, Ivan Littlewood, George Yardley		Try: W Williams, Phil Castles	Referee: William Mincham

==== Round 11 ====
The City v Newton game was discontinued at halftime due to the score line. Newton had started the match a man short and the score line had already blown out to 37–5 by the interval.

9 July	Marist	18–4	Maritime	Carlaw Park 1
3:00	Try: Arthur Eustace, Arthur Singe, John Lang, Leo Casey; Con: Edmund Carroll, Billy Ghent; Pen: Arthur Singe		Pen: George Yardley, Mike Flynn	Attendance: 6,000; Referee: Len Farrant

9 July	City	37–5	Newton	Carlaw Park 2
3:00	Try: Bill Davidson Unknown x 8 Con: Bill Davidson 2, Unknown x 3		Try: S Delaney; Pen: S Delaney	Attendance: 6,000; Referee: H Clayton

9 July	Ponsonby	21–5	Fire Brigade	Victoria Park
3:00	Try: Dougie McGregor 2, Eric McGregor, William Edwards, Bill Walsh; Con: Dougie McGregor 3		Try: R Coates; Con: Unknown x 1	Attendance: 2,000; Referee: L Hemming

=== Roope Rooster knockout competition ===
The first round match between Marist Old Boys and Maritime ended controversially with Marist complaining that the match had finished early (when they were trailing by 10 points to 8). They protested and the match was replayed with Maritime winning 21 to 10. The referee in charge, Walter Ripley announced his resignation in the following week but did referee again for several years and later served on the board of the Referee's Association.

The final was won by City Rovers who defeated Maritime in the final in front of a large crowd by 30 points to 14. Over £230 were taken at the gate which was a record for Carlaw Park, albeit in its first season of use. From this 50 percent went to the Auckland League Sick and Injured Players' Fund, 25 percent to the Hospital Radium Fund, and 25 percent to the St. John Ambulance Association.

==== Round 1 ====
16 July	City	13–7	Newton	Carlaw Park 1
3:00	Try: Bill Davidson, Harry Hawkes, Ben Davidson; Con: Bill Davidson; Pen: Bill Davidson		Try: Thomas Biggs; Con: Craddock Dufty; Drop: Craddock Dufty	Attendance: 7,000; Referee: A Ball

16 July	Maritime	10–8*	Marist	Carlaw Park 2
3:00	Try: Jim Brien 2 Con: Eric Grey; Pen: George Yardley		Try: Unknown 2 Pen: Arthur Singe	Attendance: 7,000; Referee: Walter Ripley

16 July	Ponsonby	34–11	Devonport	Auckland Domain 1
3:00	Try: George Mormon 2, Thomas McClymont 2, R Mitchell, Wilfred McNeil, Bill Walsh, W Hanlon; Con: Unknown x 5		Try: J Price, Alf Scott, Selwyn Chatfield; Pen: McAneny	Referee: T Hill

==== Semi final ====
23 July	City	8–5	Ponsonby	Victoria Park 1
3:00	Try: Bill Davidson, Alf Townsend; Con: Bill Davidson		Try: Penalty Try; Pen: Thomas McClymont	Attendance: 6,500

==== Round 1 replay ====
13 August	Maritime	21–10	Marist	Victoria Park 1
3:00	Try: Ivan Littlewood 3, Bill Ballantyne, Eric Grey; Con: Mike Flynn; Pen: George Yardley, Mike Flynn		Try: Arthur Eustace, Arthur Singe; Con: Billy Ghent; Pen: Bill Stormont	Attendance: 9,000; Referee: Len Farrant

==== Semi final ====
3 September	Maritime	12–7 (7-5)	Fire Brigade	Carlaw Park 1
3:00	Try: Ivan Littlewood, Jim Brien; Con: Mike Flynn 2 Pen: Mike Flynn		Try: R Coates; Con: J Wareing; Drop: Joseph	Attendance: 4,000; Referee: Walter Ripley

==== Final ====
The gate takings for the final were £230 which was a record to this early point in Carlaw Parks history. It was to be divided 50 percent to the Auckland Rugby League Sick and Injured Players' Fund, 25 percent to the Hospital Radium Fund, and 25 percent to the St. John Ambulance Association which provided first aiders to all the league matches.

1 October	City	30–14	Maritime	Carlaw Park 1
3:00	Try: Ben Davidson 3, Bill Davidson, C Mitchell, Harry Hawkes; Con: Bill Davidson 4, Maurice Wetherill; Pen: Bill Davidson		Try: Bert Avery 3, Jim Brien; Pen: Jim Brien	Attendance: 10,000; Referee: Bill Murray

=== Top try scorers and point scorers ===
The lists include points scored in the Monteith Shield first grade competition and the Roope Rooster competition only. Games played are estimates only based on team lists published in the Auckland Star and New Zealand Herald the day before the games, and match reports where generally several players were named.

Top try scorers
Rk	Player	Team	Games	Tries
1	Ivan Littlewood	Maritime	11	12
2	Ben Davidson	City	15	11
3	Arthur Eustace	Marist	10	10
4	Alf Townsend	City	12	8
5=	Jim Brien	Maritime	12	7
5=	Dougie McGregor	Ponsonby	7	7
7=	Bill Davidson	City	7	6
7=	Percy Gallagher	Marist	9	6
7=	Harry Hawkes	City	12	6
10=	Bill Walsh	Ponsonby	9	5
10=	Eric McGregor	Ponsonby	8	5
10=	Arthur Singe	Marist	10	5
10=	George Mormon	Ponsonby	8	5

Top point scorers
Rk	Player	Team	G	T	C	P	M	DG	Pts
1	Bill Davidson	City	7	6	28	3	1	0	82
2	Ben Davidson	City	15	11	4	0	0	0	41
3	Ivan Littlewood	Maritime	11	12	1	0	0	0	38
4	Dougie McGregor	Ponsonby	7	7	6	2	0	0	37
5	Arthur Eustace	Marist	10	10	0	0	0	0	30
6	Arthur Singe	Marist	10	5	3	3	0	0	27
7	Alf Townsend	City	12	8	0	0	0	0	24
8	Jim Brien	Maritime	12	7	1	0	0	0	23
9=	Eric Grey	Maritime	13	4	3	2	0	0	22
9=	Craddock Dufty	Newton	9	0	5	5	0	1	22

== Other club matches ==
=== Thacker Shield ===
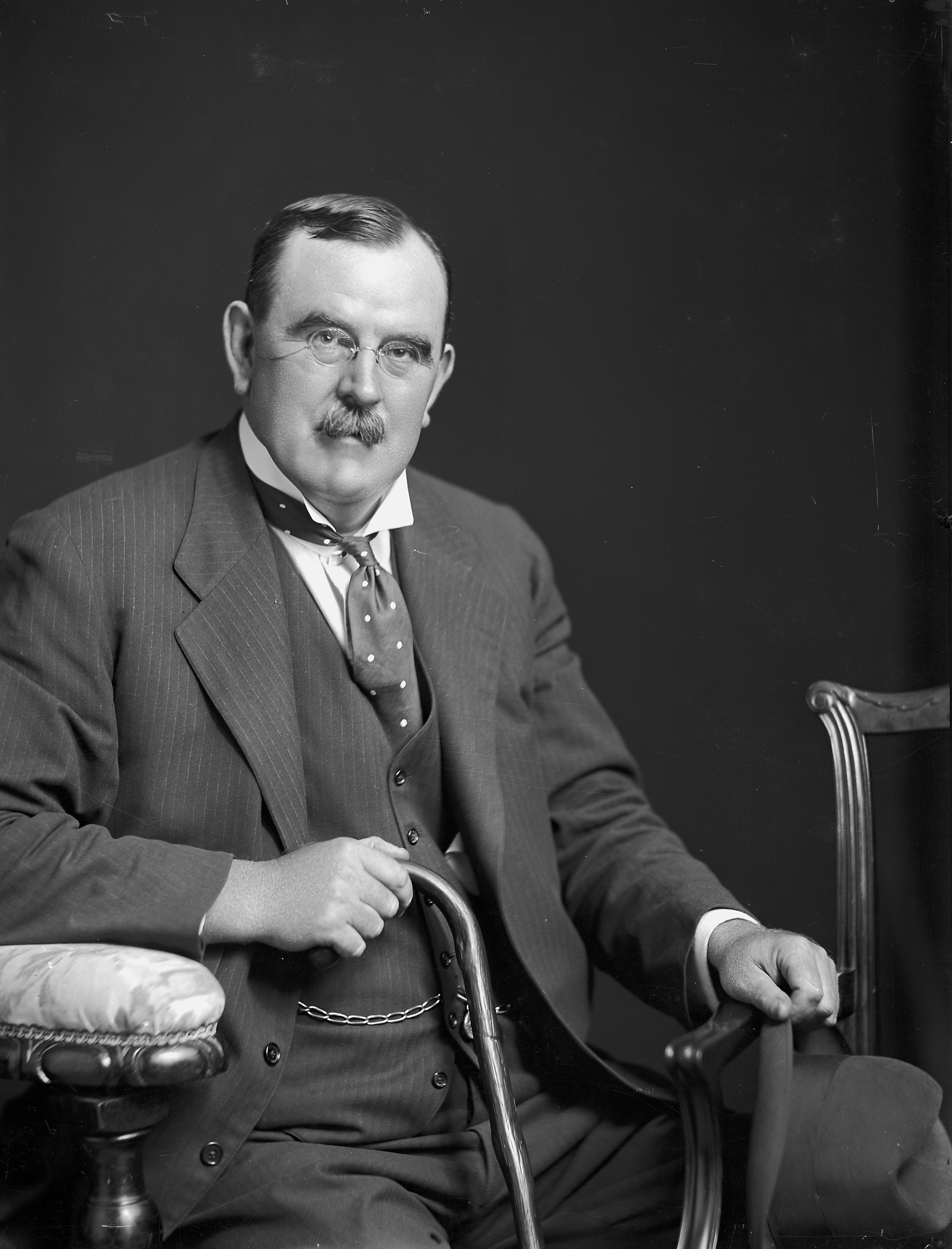
Henry Thacker

The Thacker Shield was held by Ponsonby United coming into the 1921 season however there was a dispute over whether the shield should be held by North Island teams as it was unclear if it had been intended for competition among South Island teams only. The New Zealand council decided that the rules should be amended to allow North Island teams to hold it but the donor, Dr. H.T.J. Thacker and the Canterbury Rugby League would not agree to them. As such the shield was returned to the donor. Mr. C Weaver donated a trophy to take its place and this became known as the Challenge Shield and it was this that Ponsonby went on to defend twice. They first hosted Petone from Wellington who they beat 18–13. In the curtain-raiser Petone juniors were defeated by Richmond by 14 points to 8. In the evening the Petone players were entertained at the Druids' Hall by the Ponsonby club and Auckland League. They later defeated Huntly 19–8 before losing the Shield to local rivals City Rovers

==== Ponsonby v Petone ====
10 September	Ponsonby	18–13	Petone	Carlaw Park 1
3:00	Try: Eric McGregor 2, William Southernwood, Dougie McGregor; Con: Dougie McGregor 3		Try: Horace Nunn, J Shannahan 2 Con: T Balks; Pen: Doc Nicholls	Attendance: 7,000; Referee: Bill Murray

==== Ponsonby v Huntly ====
For the Huntly side Huatahi Paki scored a try. He had previously spent a season in Auckland playing for the City Rovers side along with his brother George Paki and following the 1922 New Zealand Maori tour of Australia was signed by the St George side in Sydney for the 1923 season. The match was played in terrible conditions with heavy rain and as a result the crowd was only around 2,000.

8 October	Ponsonby	19–8	Huntly	Carlaw Park 1
3:00	Try: Thomas McClymont, F Blackie, William Edwards, Wilfred McNeil, James Hing; Con: Thomas McClymont 2		Try: Huatahi Paki, Joe Peckham; Pen: J Raynor	Attendance: 2,000; Referee: Archie Ferguson

==== City v Ponsonby ====
City took the Thacker Shield from Ponsonby and added it to their other trophies gained during the season. Harry Francis (City) and Sam Lowrie (Ponsonby) were sent off for fighting one another during the second half. Ben Davidson had earlier left the field so City only had 11 players for a time before Davidson was able to rejoin the game.

15 October	City	25–10	Ponsonby	Carlaw Park 1
3:00	Try: Harry Francis, Bill Davidson, Tim Peckham, Ben Davidson, Harry Hawkes; Con: Bill Davidson 4 Pen: Bill Davidson		Try: George Mormon, Dougie McGregor; Con: Dougie McGregor, Frank Delgrosso	Attendance: 7,500; Referee: Len Farrant

=== Exhibition matches ===
==== Hamilton v Maritime ====
18 June	Hamilton	19-16	Maritime	Steele Park, Hamilton
3:00	Try: Prickett, E Vernall, Mawhinney; Con: Dufty, E Vernall, Mawhinney; Pen: Dufty 2		Try: Mike Flynn 2, Young, Brake; Con: Mike Flynn 2

==== Cambridge v City Rovers ====
On August 13 the City senior side travelled to Cambridge to play the local team at Victoria Square. City took a young side with just 6 regular first grade players in the travelling party (Paki, Wetherill, Peckham, Francis, Reid, and Hawkes). After leading 6-5 at halftime City eventually lost 16-14. Ernie Asher the City secretary travelled with the side which was entertained afterwards at the Triangle tea rooms, and later the Town Hall Pictures.

13 August	Cambridge	16-14	City	Victoria Square, Cambridge
3:00	Try: Pau, Stewart, Churches, Coe; Con: McMillan 2		Try: Miller, Tim Peckham, Harry Hawkes 2	Referee: W.T. Smith

== Lower grades ==
There were 7 lower grades in 1921.

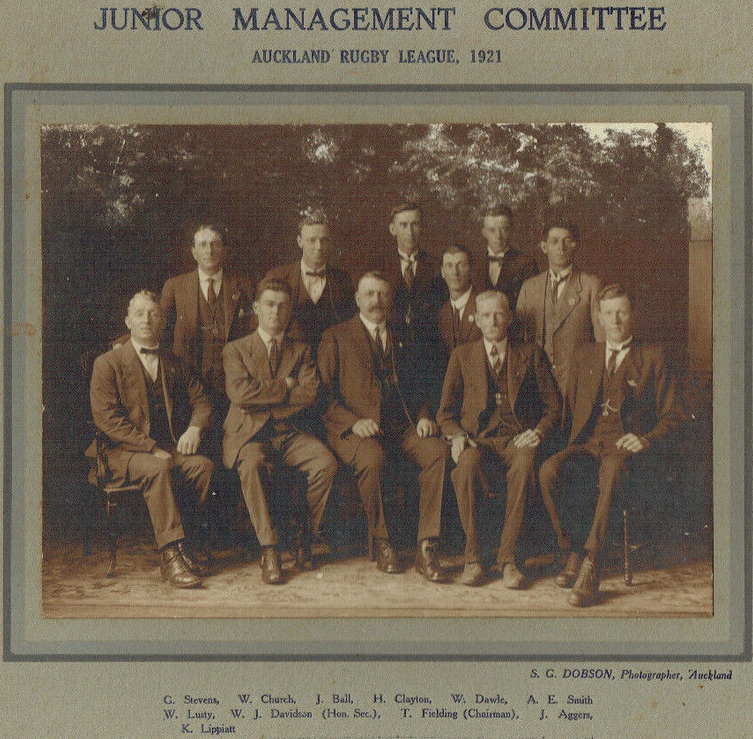

=== Second grade ===
Newton defeated Maritime in the second grade final by 17 points to 11 at Carlaw Park to win the Second Grade Cup. Future New Zealand representative Charles Gregory played for Newton. They ultimately finished the season with a 10 win, 1 draw, 1 loss record, scoring 149 points and conceding 57. North Shore withdrew prior to round 2, Marist withdrew after round 8, Manukau after round 10, and City after round 11. There were very few results reported and Newton's win/loss and for and against record was learned from their championship team photograph.

Team	Pld	W	D	L	F	A	Pts
Newton Rangers	12	10	1	1	149	57	20
Maritime	11	9	1	1	114	54	19
Otahuhu Rovers	4	2	0	2	18	24	4
Ellerslie United	3	1	0	2	35	13	2
Ponsonby United	5	1	0	4	26	50	2
Manukau	2	1	0	1	19	19	2
Northcote & Birkenhead Ramblers	2	0	0	2	8	21	0
City Rovers	2	0	0	2	0	42	0
Marist Old Boys	2	0	0	2	16	24	0
North Shore Albions	0	0	0	0	0	0	0

=== Third grade (Myers Cup) ===
Kingsland Rovers won the competition when they drew with Newton 9-9 on August 6 in round 12. Future New Zealand international Claude List was in the Kingsland side, aged 18. In the first 5 rounds many results were reported however the second half of the season had very few reported. Parnell entered a team in the knockout competition which began on August 13 and had a 3-3 draw with Ellerslie. Marist were scheduled to play Ellerslie in round 1 but there was no result reported and they withdrew from the competition after this.

Team	Pld	W	D	L	F	A	Pts
Kingsland Rovers	4	2	1	1	35	31	5
Point Chevalier	5	4	0	1	70	18	8
Newton Rangers	6	3	1	2	105	58	7
North Shore Albions	3	2	0	1	61	23	4
Ponsonby United	5	1	0	4	32	92	2
Ellerslie United	3	0	0	3	3	84	0
Marist Old Boys	0	0	0	0	0	0	0

=== Fourth grade ===
Otahuhu won the championship though not all results were reported.

Team	Pld	W	D	L	F	A	Pts
Otahuhu Rovers	7	5	0	2	45	26	10
City Rovers	7	5	1	1	64	50	11
Ponsonby United	6	4	0	2	45	25	8
Richmond Rovers	6	3	0	3	67	32	6
Manukau Rovers	6	2	0	4	43	40	4
Marist Old Boys	6	2	1	3	42	48	5
North Shore Albions	3	1	0	2	19	14	2
Kingsland Rovers	2	1	0	1	28	11	2
Takapuna	3	1	0	2	10	17	2
Northcote & Birkenhead Ramblers	3	0	0	3	5	39	0
Marist Old Boys A	2	0	0	2	3	24	0
Marist Old Boys B	1	0	0	1	0	44	0

=== Fifth grade ===
City Rovers defeated Richmond by 5 points to 2 to win the championship. There were very few results reported during the season. Marist entered 2 teams however their B team withdrew after round 3. Kingsland withdrew after round 11, and North Shore and Manukau after round 12. Parnell entered a team late in the season to play a friendly match.

Team	Pld	W	D	L	F	A	Pts
City Rovers	7	5	1	1	64	50	11
Otahuhu Rovers	7	5	0	2	45	26	10
Ponsonby United	6	4	0	2	45	25	8
Richmond Rovers	6	3	0	3	67	32	6
Manukau Rovers	6	2	0	4	43	40	4
Marist Old Boys	6	2	1	3	42	48	5
North Shore Albions	3	1	0	2	19	14	2
Kingsland Rovers	2	1	0	1	28	11	2
Takapuna	3	1	0	2	10	17	2
Northcote & Birkenhead Ramblers	3	0	0	3	5	39	0
Marist Old Boys A	2	0	0	2	3	24	0
Marist Old Boys B	1	0	0	1	0	44	0

=== Sixth grade A ===
Richmond won the competition. There were very few results reported during the season. Parnell entered a team in the competition on July 23 though it is unclear if their 5 matches counted towards the championship. Only one of their results was reported, a 9-2 loss to Maritime.

Team	Pld	W	D	L	F	A	Pts
Richmond Rovers	7	6	0	1	68	22	12
City Rovers	4	4	0	0	56	10	8
Maritime	4	1	0	3	12	26	2
Manukau Rovers	2	1	0	1	16	9	2
Takapuna	4	0	0	4	9	87	0
Parnell	1	0	0	1	2	9	0

=== Sixth grade B ===
Ponsonby won the competition. There were almost no results reported beyond round 6, with only 3 of Ponsonby's results reported. Parnell entered a team on July 16 and played 3 matches. It is unclear if their matches contributed to the final standings, the only game that had a result reported for them was a 33-0 loss to Ponsonby.

Team	Pld	W	D	L	B	F	A	Pts
Ponsonby United	3	2	0	1	0	64	11	4
Marist Old Boys	5	5	0	0	80	10	2	10
Otahuhu Rovers	3	3	0	0	1	39	0	6
Kingsland Rovers	4	2	0	2	1	17	32	4
Richmond Rovers	3	2	0	1	0	10	26	4
City Rovers	3	0	0	3	2	5	26	0
Maritime	2	0	0	2	1	0	8	0
Manukau Rovers	1	0	0	1	2	0	16	0
Parnell	1	0	0	1	0	0	33	0

=== Cadet competition ===
This was the first year that a cadet competition had been played. The 18th Company won the competition. The 34th Cadets were based in Mt Eden while the 51st Senior Cadets were based in Devonport. This competition was won by the 18th Company of Senior Cadets after they won the final game of the season defeating the 13th Company by 7 points to 2. The 23rd Company played a match with the 37th Company which they won 19 to 0. This match was outside of the competition.

Team	Pld	W	D	L	F	A	Pts
18th Company	7	5	1	1	122	7	11
13th A Company	8	5	1	2	85	23	11
4th Company	6	4	0	2	85	17	8
51st Company (Devonport)	4	2	0	2	34	66	4
34th Company (Mt Eden)	6	1	0	5	22	77	2
13th B Company	7	1	0	6	5	163	2

== Auckland representative fixtures ==
It was a very busy season for the Auckland representative team with eleven matches played. Though in reality B and C teams played some of the fixtures as matches were played at the same time in different centres. One of the matches was by the Auckland touring team against Ponsonby on August 13, in the weekend prior to their departure. They won seven matches and lost four. On 20 August Auckland played three matches, which showed off their depth. One at Carlaw Park versus King Country, one in Hamilton against South Auckland, and one against Wellington on the Basin Reserve. They won against King Country and Wellington, with a loss against South Auckland.

=== Auckland v New Zealand ===
21 May	Auckland	16–22	New Zealand	Auckland Domain 1
3:00	Try: Frank Delgrosso, Thomas McClymont, George Cargill, Leonard Newdick; Con: George Yardley, Thomas McClymont		Try: Bill Davidson 3, Jim Sanders, Bill Williams, Henry Tancred; Con: Bill Davidson; Pen: Bill Davidson	Attendance: 11,000; Referee: Archie Ferguson

=== Auckland v Wellington (Northern Union C.C.) ===
30 July	Auckland	31–8	Wellington	Carlaw Park 1
3:00	Try: Bill Davidson, John Lang 2, Bill Stormont, Harry Hawkes, Bert Avery 2 Con: Bill Davidson		Try: K Thompson, Nicholls; Pen: J Kruse	Attendance: 6,000; Referee: Billy Murray

=== Auckland v Hawkes Bay (Northern Union C.C.) ===
6 August	Auckland	18–3	Hawkes Bay	Carlaw Park 1
3:00	Try: Eric Grey, Charles Woolley, Harry Hawkes, Bert Avery; Con: Bill Davidson 3		Try: A Atkins	Attendance: 6500; Referee: Archie Ferguson

=== Auckland v Ponsonby ===
This match was something of a practice match and played as a curtain raiser to the Maritime - Marist Round 1 replay in the Roope Rooster though it had a huge crowd in attendance of nearly 10,000 at Victoria Park. Ben and Bill Davidson scored all of Auckland's points in their 22-12 loss. For the strong Ponsonby side Sam Lowrie and Bill Walsh scored two of their three tries, while Thomas McClymont kicked 5 goals.

13 August	Auckland	12-22	Ponsonby	Victoria Park 1
1:45	Try: Ben Davidson, Bill Davidson; Con: Bill Davidson 2 Pen: Bill Davidson		Try: Henderson, Sam Lowrie, Bill Walsh; Con: Thomas McClymont 4 Pen: Thomas McClymont	Attendance: 9,000

=== Auckland v King Country ===
20 August	Auckland	58–25	King Country	Carlaw Park 1
3:00	Try: Wally Somers 3, Charles Woolley, Bill Davidson, Bert Avery 5, Thomas McClymont 3, Arthur Singe; Con: Wally Somers, Bill Davidson 2, Thomas McClymont 3, Eric Grey, Arthur Singe		Try: Lyall 2, Wallace 2, Jumbo; Con: Cribb, Henry 3 Pen: Henry	Attendance: 4,000; Referee: Billy Murray

=== South Auckland (Waikato) v Auckland ===
20 August	South Auckland (Waikato)	13–3	Auckland	Claudelands Showgrounds, Hamilton
3:00	Try: Hemmingway 2, Wilson; Con: J Dufty; Pen: J Dufty		Try: George Paki	Attendance: 2,500; Referee: T Smith

=== Wellington v Auckland ===
20 August	Wellington	21–23	Auckland	Basin Reserve, Wellington
3:00	Try: Hodges, J Shanahan 2 Con: Nicholls 2 Pen: Nicholls 2 (and 1 mark), Balks		Try: Ivan Littlewood, Tim Peckham, Wilfred McNeil, Bill Stormont, Harry Hawkes; Con: Mike Flynn 3, Bill Stormont	Referee: C Snow

=== West Coast v Auckland ===
24 August	West Coast	7–47	Auckland	Victoria Park, Greymouth
3:00	Try: A McElwee; Con: A McElwee; Pen: Charlie McElwee		Try: Harry Hawkes 4, Ivan Littlewood 2, Tim Peckham, George Cargill 2, Mike Flynn, Maurice Wetherill; Con: Harry Hawkes, Mike Flynn 2, Maurice Wetherill, Bill Stormont, Arthur Eustace, George Cargill	Referee: B Munson

=== Hawkes Bay v Auckland ===
The Auckland team was mentioned as "Auckland B" in 2 sources however they were named as Auckland on multiple occasions and was essentially the same team which played South Auckland the week prior where it was considered Auckland and therefore they have been considered a full Auckland side.

27 August	Hawkes Bay	18-15	Auckland	Nelson Ground, Napier
3:00	Try: Con McCarthy, W Gibson 2, H Douglas; Con: P Exeter; Pen: N McCarthy, P Exeter		Try: Percy Gallagher 2, S Delaney; Con: Craddock Dufty; Pen: Craddock Dufty 2	Attendance: 1,000

=== Canterbury v Auckland ===
27 August	Canterbury	14–39	Auckland	Sydenham Park, Christchurch
3:00	Try: W Green, Jim Sanders, R Watts, W Healey; Con: Jim Sanders		Try: Ben Davidson 2, John McGregor, George Yardley, Maurice Wetherill, Charles James, Bill Stormont, Harry Hawkes 2 Con: Mike Flynn 5, Tim Peckham	Attendance: 5000; Referee: A Morris

=== Hawkes Bay v Auckland B ===
27 August	Hawkes Bay	18–15	Auckland B	Napier
3:00	Try: Douglas, Gibson 2, McCarthy; Con: Exeter; Pen: McCarthy, Exeter		Try: Percy Gallagher 2, S Delaney; Con: Craddock Dufty; Pen: Craddock Dufty 2

=== Auckland v South Auckland (Waikato) ===
17 September	Auckland	35–13	South Auckland (Waikato)	Carlaw Park 1
3:00	Try: Ben Davidson 4, Bill Davidson, Harry Hawkes 2, Bert Avery, George Paki; Con: Bill Davidson 4		Try: Lyall Stewart, H Manning, S Neill; Con: A. Wilson-Hall; Pen: A. Wilson-Hall	Attendance: 5500

=== Auckland representative matches played and scorers ===
No	Name	Club Team	Play	Tries	Con	Pen	Points
1	Bill Davidson	City	5	4	16	1	46
2	Harry Hawkes	City	6	11	1	0	35
3	Bert Avery	Marist	4	9	0	0	27
4	Mike Flynn	Maritime	6	1	10	0	23
5	Thomas McClymont	Ponsonby	4	4	4	0	20
6	Ben Davidson	City	5	7	0	0	21
7	Bill Stormont	Marist	5	3	2	0	13
8	Wally Somers	Newton	2	3	1	0	11
8	George Cargill	Marist	4	3	1	0	11
10	Ivan Littlewood	Maritime	2	3	0	0	9
11	Tim Peckham	City	5	2	1	0	8
11	Maurice Wetherill	City	7	2	1	0	8
11	George Yardley	Maritime	4	2	1	0	8
14	Craddock Dufty	Newton	2	0	1	2	6
14	Charles Woolley	Fire Brigade	5	2	0	0	6
14	John Lang	Maritime	4	2	0	0	6
14	George Paki	City	3	2	0	0	6
14	Percy Gallagher	Marist	3	2	0	0	6
19	Arthur Singe	Marist	4	1	1	0	5
19	Eric Grey	Maritime	4	1	1	0	5
21	S Delaney	Newton	3	1	0	0	3
21	Frank Delgrosso	Ponsonby	2	1	0	0	3
21	Leonard Newdick	Newton	3	1	0	0	3
21	Wilfred McNeil	Ponsonby	2	1	0	0	3
21	Charles James	Newton	4	1	0	0	3
21	John McGregor	Maritime	3	1	0	0	3
26	Arthur Eustace	Marist	2	0	1	0	2
27	Sam Lowrie	Ponsonby	3	0	0	0	0
27	Bill Williams	Newton*, Fire Brigade	3	0	0	0	0
27	Harry Wynn	Devonport	4	0	0	0	0
27	Neil Ballantyne	Maritime	2	0	0	0	0
27	M Clark	Maritime	2	0	0	0	0
27	Billy Ghent	Marist	2	0	0	0	0
27	George Mormon	Ponsonby	2	0	0	0	0
27	Alf Townsend	City	3	0	0	0	0
27	Vic Thomas	City	2	0	0	0	0
27	Frank Turner	Marist	2	0	0	0	0
27	Clarence Webb	Devonport	2	0	0	0	0
27	R Coates	Fire Brigade	2	0	0	0	0
27	E Elliott	Fire Brigade	2	0	0	0	0
27	J Price	Devonport	2	0	0	0	0
27	Nelson Bass	Newton	1	0	0	0	0
27	Ray Harley	City	1	0	0	0	0
27	James (Sonny) Hing	Marist	1	0	0	0	0
27	Joe Meadows	Ponsonby	1	0	0	0	0
27	A Nelson	Devonport	1	0	0	0	0
27	Bill Walsh	Ponsonby	1	0	0	0	0
27	Bill Cloke	Newton	1	0	0	0	0
27	Alf Scott	North Shore	1	0	0	0	0

Bill Williams began the season playing for Newton Rangers however after they were struggling for numbers and defaulted a game he transferred to the Fire Brigade team where he played 3 matches in June and July.

== New Zealand representatives from Auckland ==
Team to tour Australia

Backs

- Eric Grey (Maritime)
- Charles Woolley (Fire Brigade)
- Bill Davidson (City Rovers)
- Bert Laing (City Rovers)
- Clarrie Polson (Newton Rangers)

Forwards

- Wally Somers (Newton Rangers)
- Bill Williams (Newton Rangers)
- Henry Tancred (City Rovers)
- George Paki (City Rovers)
- Joe Meadows (Ponsonby)
- Bert Avery (Maritime)
