= Takapuna Rugby League Football Club =

Defunct NZ rugby league club, based in Auckland

Club information
- Full name: Takapuna Rugby League Football Club
- Nickname: Takapuna Pacific
- Short name: Takapuna
- Colours: Unknown
- Founded: 1921
- Exited: 1925

Former details
- Ground: Takapuna
- Competition: Auckland Rugby League

Takapuna Rugby League Football Club were a rugby league club in Auckland. They competed from 1921 until 1925. They represented the Takapuna suburb on the North Shore of Auckland.

== History ==
=== 1921 Takapuna Rugby League Football Club ===
A club had previously existed in the Takapuna area and was named Pupuke however they only lasted for the 1917 season before ceasing to exist and had no obvious connection to the Takapuna club which formed 4 years later.

It was reported at the Auckland Rugby League meeting on March 9, 1921, that “a meeting would be held at Takapuna this evening [March 10] for the purpose of forming a league club there”. On March 12 they posted advertisements in the Auckland Star and New Zealand Herald that they were holding a general meeting on Tuesday, March 15 in the Parish Hall in Takapuna. With all interested and intending players requested to attend. The notice was published by W. Dowle, their honorary secretary. Dowle was Wilfred Wesley Dowle who was aged 21 at the time.

The club entered teams in the 5th and 6th grades. The 5th grade side only had 3 games reported with a win and 2 losses. While the 6th grade side playing in the A section had 4 results reported which were all losses. The 5th grade team's first ever match was a preseason game against Kingsland Rovers on April 30 at Takapuna. The club's first ever competition games were on May 7 with both the 5th and 6th grade teams both playing at Takapuna. The 6th grade team played at 2pm against City Rovers with Mr. Belcham refereeing. They lost the match 16–0. While the 5th grade team played their neighbouring club, North Shore Albions at 3pm but the result was not reported. The 5th grades first reported result was in their second match against Otahuhu on May 14, losing 7 to 2. Their only reported win came at the Auckland Domain #2 field against Manukau on July 23 when they won 5–0 with a try to Hyland which was converted by Holmes.

=== 1922 Fifth grade champions ===
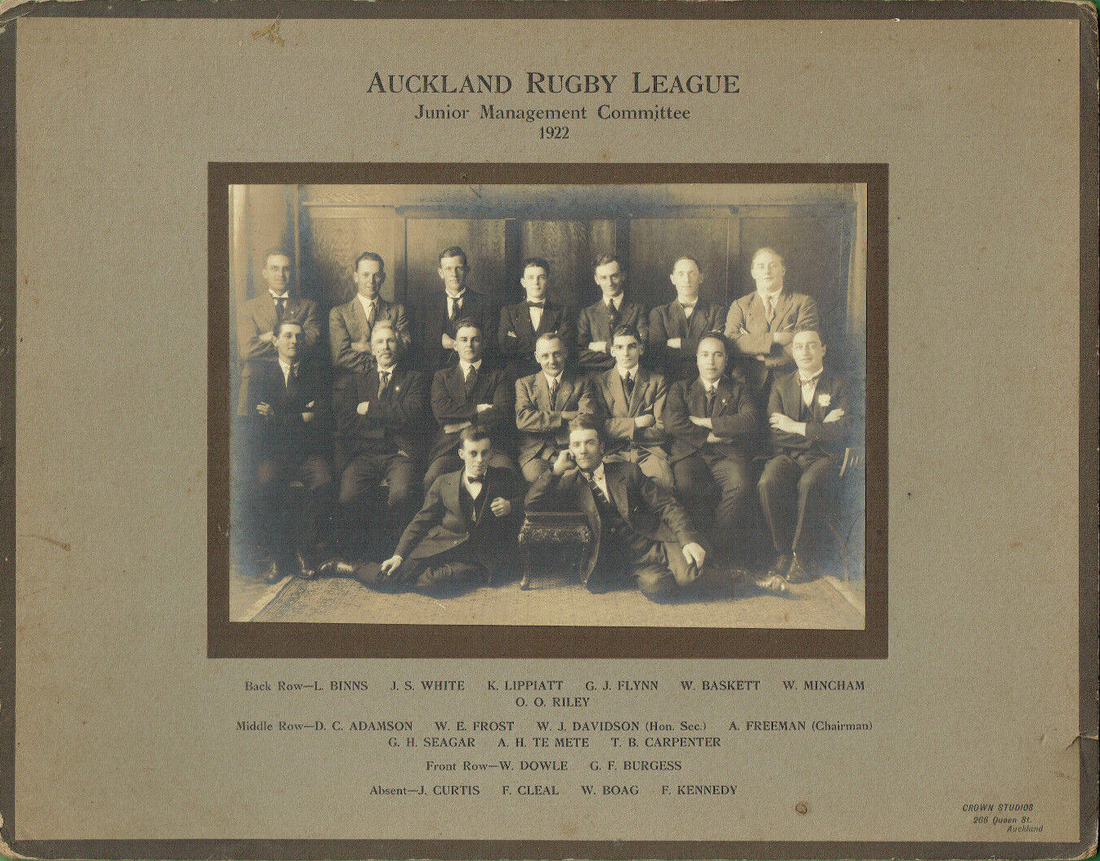
Takapuna secretary (Wilfred Dowle) in the front left

The 1922 season saw Takapuna only field one team which played in the 5th grade. The team performed particularly well and won the championship, lifting the Endean Memorial Shield in the process. Many results were not reported during the year however of the results reported Takapuna won 7 and lost 1 of the games that had results submitted to the newspapers. At the start of the season they held practices at the Show Grounds with their last preseason practice on April 29. Their honorary secretary was still Wilfred Dowle. The showgrounds were located close to the present day Takapuna Golf Course.

They began the year with a 13–2 win over Northcote & Birkenhead Ramblers on May 6 at Northcote which was based at Stafford Park at this time. They then had wins over Richmond on May 13 by 17 points to 5, before a default win over Marist Old Boys on May 20. They beat Manukau 12–11 on June 10 and then beat Ponsonby United 12-0 a week later. On July 15 they defeated Marist 14–0 with the scorers reported. They were Paul, Petit, Gibbons, and Sweetman. On July 22 they lost to Richmond 8–3 with Holmes scoring their try however the league ordered the match to be replayed. The ARL said “an appeal by Richmond against a decision of the junior committee that the fifth grade game Richmond v. Takapuna be replayed was upheld, on the ground that the question was on a matter of fact in which the referee's decision must be held to be final”. On August 5 Takapuna beat Manukau 16-8 however the Manukau club appealed the decision of the junior management committee not to grant a replay of the match and the management committee agreed with a replay ordered. No reason was given for the appeal.

On August 26 the club got to play most likely its first ever game on Carlaw Park which had been opened the previous season. The match was their rescheduled game against Manukau on the number 2 field at 2pm with Mr. Rogers refereeing. The following week Takapuna played Richmond in the match to decide the championship at Carlaw Park no. 1 at 1.45pm. The game was the curtain raiser to the Auckland match against South Auckland. The result of the game was not reported.

A Cadet competition was also being held involving military cadets and A team from Takapuna joined the competition mid season on July 8. They played 9 games but only had 2 results reported which were both losses.

=== 1923 Fifth grade ===
The 1923 season saw Takapuna only field one team again which was once more their fifth grade side. This year they finished runners up to their rivals Richmond. Takapuna won 9 games with a draw and 3 losses and didn't compete in the knockout competition at the end of the season. They held their annual meeting at Greenwood's Gymnasium at Hall's Corner on Thursday, March 29. Their honorary secretary was W. Allen. Then on the 31st of May they held “an important general meeting” in the Takapuna Borough Council Chambers with the notice posted by honorary secretary J. Wilson. On June 9 they defeated Richmond 9–0 with Warman, Stewart, and Paul scoring tries for Takapuna. The following week their team list for their upcoming game against Newton Rangers was published. Previously they had never done this. The team was Wilson (2), Holmes (2), Warman (2), Davis, Polkinghorne, Coleman, Gibbons, Stewart, Ogilvie, Hicks, Cruther, Paul, and Morrison. Takapuna won the game 9–0 at the Auckland Domain with Stewart scoring 2 tries and W. Wilson 1. A week later they beat Northcote 6–3 with Holmes and Coleman scoring their 2 tries.

At the conclusion of the championship the New Zealand Herald published the points of the respective leading teams: “the fifth grade competition has been won by Richmond 20 points, with Takapuna, 19 points, second. City, 16, and Newton, 14, are next in order”. The season was somewhat controversial however as Takapuna contested a loss to Richmond a week earlier by 7 points to 0. On August 22 it was reported that “an appeal was received from the Takapuna club against the finding of the junior management committee in a protest against the Richmond fifth grade team on the ground that the Richmond team had played a man who had not been regraded from a higher grade. The finding of the Junior Management Committee was upheld”. They were not finished however and protested once more with it being sent to the Junior Board to be forwarded to the New Zealand Rugby League on September 19. The New Zealand Rugby League then dismissed the protest the following week for “being out of order”.

At the conclusion of the season the club held a general meeting on November 22 at Marshall's Billiard Saloon. Their honorary secretary J. Wilson advertised the meeting.

=== 1924 (Fourth Grade) ===
In 1924 the Takapuna club promoted their solitary team to the 4th grade. They struggled in the competition and in July withdrew when they had 1 win, 1 draw, and 4 losses. Their annual meeting was at Marshall's Billiard Saloon on March 6.

At the beginning of the season the Auckland Rugby League applied for permission to play games at the Takapuna Racecourse (on the centre field). They were however sent a letter from the Takapuna Jockey Club that no grounds would be available or the season for football.

Takapuna's first game of the season was against the newly former United Suburbs club at Birkenhead on May 11. They won by 11 points to 5 at Takapuna. Their team had been published in the Auckland Star prior to the match and was: Richards, Ogilvie, Coleman, Gassey, Davies, Edwards, Warman, Paul, Polkinghorne (2), Hicks, Tatton, Gibbons, Thomas, Morrison, Bennett, Sherritt, and Lawrence. On June 14 they played Parnell at Carlaw Park as one of the curtain raisers to the Auckland game against the touring Australian University side. They began to seriously struggle at this point of the season losing to Ellerslie 29–3 at the Ellerslie Racecourse ground. Then on July 12 they were thrashed by Ponsonby United 59–0 at Birkenhead. Every single member of the Ponsonby side reportedly scored and this was the last match of the season which Takapuna played. They were drawn to play Marist the following week at the Outer Domain but no result was reported and they were not drawn to play any further fixtures.

=== 1925 Takapuna Pacific ===
In 1925 the Takapuna club failed to field a team however late in the year a "Takapuna Pacific" side entered the 4th grade competition featuring several of the Takapuna players from the previous season. It is unclear if they were the same club however given the Auckland Rugby League made no mention of a new club being registered they were most likely ostensibly the same club. Their team to play on 8 August was Wheatley, Herbert, S. Wagstaff, T. Blomfield, Brawn, Patrick, R. Webster, Cryer, L. Wagstaff, Hyland, Neville, Overington, Bennett, Chester, C. Stewart, Warman, T. Webster, and Hawera. They played Ponsonby in the 4th grade knockout competition on August 15 and lost 23–0 at Takapuna. In other team lists "L. Crutcher", "Veitch", "Patrick", "R Smith", and "Nicholson" were named.

On September 19 they were thrashed by Athletic 40-3

=== 1930 Brief revival ===
In June of the 1930 season a Takapuna team joined the 4th grade competition mid season. It was reported on June 5 that a new club was forming at Milford on Auckland's North Shore. A Mr. W.E. Swain wrote to the league saying that "there are sufficient players, and all are anxious to make a start", and that "a suitable ground is available, and everything seems to point to the ultimate success, if the formation of a club is properly launched". They defeated Avondale 15 to 2 at Takapuna on June 28. The Sun newspaper reported that it was their first game since their formation. They had fixtures against Northcote on July 5, and Richmond on July 19 but there were no results reported and they had no further fixtures beyond this. Their matches had been against teams which had had byes in the weeks prior.

== Season records ==
=== Highest graded team in each season ===
Season	Grade	Name	Pld	W	D	L	PF	PA	PD	Pts	Position (Teams)
1921	5th Grade	Takapuna	3	1	0	2	10	17	-7	2	Ninth (Twelve), Many results unreported
1922	5th Grade	Takapuna	12	7	0	1	93	36	+57	14	First (Eight)
1923	5th Grade	Takapuna	12	9	1	3	52	12	+40	19	Second (Ten)
1924	4th Grade	Takapuna	6	1	1	4	19	114	-95	3	Eighth (Fourteen), many results unknown
1921-24	Total		33	18	2	10	174	179	-5	38	
