= George Paki =

New Zealand Maori international rugby league player

Personal information
- Full name: George Hori Paki
- Born: 16 June 1893 Huntly, New Zealand
- Died: 12 April 1974 (aged 80) Auckland, New Zealand

Playing information
- Height: 5 ft 11 in (1.80 m)
- Weight: 87 kg (13 st 10 lb)

Rugby union
- Position: Fullback
Club
Years	Team	Pld	T	G	FG	P
1910	Kia Ora (juniors)	6	1	0	0	3
1911	Huntly	7	0	0	0	0
1914	Gordonton	5	3	0	0	9
	Total	18	4	0	0	12
Representative
Years	Team	Pld	T	G	FG	P
1909–11	Huntly (rep)	3	1	0	0	3
1911	Lower Waikato	4	1	0	0	3
1913	NZ Māori (unofficial)	6	3	0	0	9
1914	Hamilton (rep)	1	0	0	0	3

Rugby league
- Position: Wing, Fullback, Prop, Second-row
Club
Years	Team	Pld	T	G	FG	P
1915	Ponsonby United	3	1	0	0	3
1917–22	City Rovers	64	21	1	0	66
1917	Combined (City, Newton, & N Shore)	1	0	0	0	0
1924	Richmond Rovers	3	0	0	0	0
1925–26	City Rovers	11	1	0	0	3
	Total	82	23	1	0	72
Representative
Years	Team	Pld	T	G	FG	P
1915–16	Lower Waikato	2	1	0	0	3
1918–21	Auckland	5	2	0	0	6
1921	New Zealand	4	2	0	0	6
1922	NZ Māori	6	1	0	0	3
1922	Auckland Province	1	0	0	0	0

Coaching information
Representative
Years	Team	Gms	W	D	L	W%
1922	New Zealand Māori	5	2	0	3	40
- Relatives: Huatahi 'Brownie' Paki (brother)

George Paki was a New Zealand international rugby league player. He debuted for New Zealand in 1921 and became Kiwi number 151 in the process. He also played for New Zealand Māori rugby league team and an unofficial New Zealand Māori rugby side which toured Australia and New Zealand in 1913.

== Early life ==
George (Hori) Paki was born on June 16, 1893, in Huntly, Waikato. His father was Hori Kerei Paki, and his mother was Raukura Paki (née Matena). He had 2 brothers and 6 sisters; Ngaurupa, Wetere, Huatahi Turoa Brown, Rangiatea, Te Atawhai, Pitongatonga Marama Nancy Te Paki, and Mere Nutana Te Paki.

== Playing career ==
=== Rugby Union beginnings ===
In 1909 aged 16 Paki was chosen for the final Huntly representative match of the season against Taupiri at Taupiri. He was named to play in the five-eighth position. In 1909 Paki played for the “Kia Ora (native) junior” team in the Lower Waikato competition. He made 6 appearances in their backline, in the fullback and three quarters positions and scored a try in a 6–0 win over Taupiri on May 28.

In 1911 Paki moved to the Huntly club where he debuted in the senior side. He played 7 matches for them against Taupiri, Hamilton and Rangiriri before being selected for the Lower Waikato representative team. He made his debut against Franklin on August 5 and scored a try in a 10–3 win where he played five eighth. His other appearances were against Hamilton, Franklin, and then a 38–3 loss to Auckland. Paki played five eighth in all of the matches. Paki finished the season playing for the Huntly representative side against Hamilton at Huntly on September 23. He scored a try once again playing at five eighth in a 12–11 win.

It is unknown where Paki played in 1912 as he does not appear in any newspaper reports for rugby or rugby league matches anywhere in New Zealand. Then in 1913 he was selected for a New Zealand Māori side to tour Australia. Only 7 of the original 23 selected for the tour which was organised by Ned Parata who had taken previously organised the first official Maori tour in 1910 and was to take further teams in 1922, 1923, and 1926–27. The team did not perform particularly well compared to previous New Zealand Māori teams. As a result, the team seems to have been regarded as an unofficial side and is not included in New Zealand Māori rugby records. Paki played in a pre-tour match on May 24 in Rotorua where the team had assembled prior to departing, staying with Parata. He played at fullback in front of "a large crowd … at Pukeroa Hill" which was won by the Māori side 17–9 over the local Rotorua team. He scored the third try for his team which came about after a loose scrum where he "picked up, raced down the line, and over at the corner". They then played a Thames side before departing for Australia. In Australia they played New South Wales twice for two losses, had a win and a loss against Queensland and won their other 4 matches. Paki only made two appearances on the tour, the first was against New South Wales on June 9 where he came on as a replacement for Sam Piki who received a compound stress fracture in his leg in a 3–15 loss. His only other match on tour was against a Sydney Metropolitan side which they won 6–3. After the match with New South Wales he was said to have played so well that the New South Wales team presented him with a "valuable trophy". After returning to New Zealand Paki gave the trophy to King Te Rata Mahuta.

They had returned to New Zealand on July 4 and immediately embarked on a series of games against New Zealand provincial sides including Auckland (0-25), Horowhenua (7-6), Canterbury (0-11), and Southland (8-5). Paki did not play in any of these matches but he was to play in their final 3 tour matches against Otago, South Canterbury, and Wellington. Paki played in the forwards against Otago in a 3–3 draw in front of 6,000 spectators in Dunedin. He then played against South Canterbury in Timaru, which was the first time a 'Maori' team had played there for 25 years according to the 'Timaru Herald'. Paki's team ran out 19-8 winners in wet conditions at the Caledonian Ground. In the match with Wellington at Athletic Park the Maori side found themselves down 23–0 in the second half before a spirited fight back saw them only lose 23–21 with Paki scoring two of their tries after breaking free from lineouts on each occasion.

In late September Paki was named in as an emergency player in the Māori side for a match with the touring Australian team but he did not take the field. The match was a late addition to the Australian schedule to help raise money for Piki who had taken a long time to recover from his broken leg earlier in the year. The Māori side won the match 12–9 at Alexandra Park.

Paki changed clubs once again to begin the 1914 season where he turned out for Gordonton in a seven-a-side competition played on Easter Monday at Claudelands. He played 5 matches for them and scored 3 tries but the side struggled to field a team and either played short or defaulted several matches with Paki's last appearance for them being against St Mary's on June 27. On June 6 he played for the Hamilton side in their match against Goldfields which they lost 9–3.

=== Switch to rugby league and move to Auckland ===
At some point in 1915 George Paki made the switch to the rugby league code. It is unclear when he made the move and which team if any he was playing for during the season but on September 11 he played for the Lower Waikato representative team against Auckland in Huntly. He was listed at five eighth and said to be representing the Huntly area. Paki scored a try in a 19–6 win for the Lower Waikato side in Huntly. In 1916 again it is unclear who Paki was playing for during the season but he played for the Lower Waikato side against City Rovers in Auckland. Playing alongside Paki was his brother Huatahi Paki who was just 16 years old at the time and was said to be a St Stephens College Old Boy. City Rovers won the match 13–9. It is likely that the brothers both impressed their opponents as they moved to Auckland for the 1917 season and joined the City side.

Paki played 14 matches for them during the season in the Auckland club competition which by this point was in its 8th full season. The City Rovers were one of the founding clubs and had been in existence since 1909. He made his debut against Otahuhu at Otahuhu and scored his one and only try of the season for them against North Shore Albions in round 2.

In 1918 Paki played 13 matches for City and was also selected to play in an Auckland trial match between A and B teams. Paki played for the B team in a 15–36 loss at Victoria Park. During the war years Auckland had played almost no representative matches however they were to play Canterbury on September 14. Paki was selected for the Auckland team at fullback and they ran out 45 to 9 winners at the Auckland Domain in front of 10,000 spectators.

=== New Zealand selection ===
Paki played 9 matched for City in the 1919 season which saw his brother Huatahi move back to Huntly midway through. He scored tries against Ponsonby and Maritime but his season was punctuated by Auckland representative fixtures. On May 14 he played for Auckland A against Auckland B in a trial which his side lost 15–14. Then on May 24 he played for Auckland against the New Zealand team who were about to tour Australia. Paki played at fullback in a 19–25 loss in front of 8,000 spectators at the Auckland Domain. He was named as an 'emergency' player for their matches with the Returned Soldiers on July 20 and on August 23 for the New Zealand team following their return to New Zealand but was not required to take the field in either game. At the end of the season he was named in the Maritime club side to tour the Hawkes Bay despite not being a playing member of the side. It is likely they wished to strengthen the team. It's unknown if he ultimately went on the tour as reporting of it was patchy.

It is likely that Paki was working in the ports while he was in Auckland as he participated in the Waterside Workers Picnic athletic events each summer from 1920 to 1924. Paki had a successful 1920 season personally at a club level leading the competition in tries scored with 9 from 14 appearances. At the start of the following season he was awarded a gold medal by the City Rovers club at their annual meeting for being the best forward in the club for his feats. Maurice Wetherill won the medal for best back.

In 1921 Paki played 3 matches for City before being selected in the forwards for the New Zealand team to tour Australia on May 16. Twenty players were selected for the 8 match tour by H Oakley, Jim Rukutai, and R. J. Sterling. They departed for Sydney on board the SS Maheno on May 26. Prior to departing they played a match against Auckland at the Auckland Domain with Paki named in the reserves though he did not take the field in the match won by New Zealand 22–16.

Paki's first appearance and New Zealand debut came in the third match of the tour against Queensland at the Brisbane Exhibition Ground in Brisbane. Ten thousand spectators were on hand to see the local side win by 21 points to 16 after New Zealand had defeated them 5 days earlier 25–12. Paki played in the front row alongside Harry Tancred and Bert Avery. New Zealand trailed 18–8 at halftime in the match which was played on a wet ground with areas of surface water. Paki next played against Toowoomba in the 5th match of the tour where he showed his famed versatility by playing lock. New Zealand was beaten 30–18 in front of a crowd of 3,000 at Athletic Oval in Toowoomba. Paki's third game for New Zealand came in the tourists final match against Newcastle at the Newcastle Showgrounds. New Zealand won the match 27 to 14 in front of 3,000 spectators with Paki moving back into the front row and crossing the line for a try.

Once back in Auckland, Paki played for New Zealand against South Auckland in Hamilton on July 27. New Zealand lost to the local team 23–21 in a match described as one of "the most exciting and attractive ever witnessed in Hamilton". Paki's try came late in the match scoring near the posts to give New Zealand a 21–18 lead which they could not hang on to. Paki's brother Huatahi scoring for the South Auckland side. Paki then played twice for Auckland against South Auckland on August 20, and the same opponents on September 17. He captained the Auckland side at this time. The first encounter saw Auckland lose 13–3 at Claudelands Showgrounds in Hamilton with Paki scoring Auckland's only points when he took a pass from Gallagher to give Auckland a 3–2 lead. The match was for the Northern Union Challenge Cup and the defeat saw it change hands for the first time in its history. The September match saw Auckland run out 35-13 victors at Carlaw Park which had been opened only months earlier. Paki again came up against his brother. Paki scored a try though this time it was the last try of the match after receiving the ball at the end of some chain passing and crossing untouched. He captained the Auckland team which treavelled to Napier to play Hawkes Bay at the Nelson Ground in Napier. Auckland lost 18-15. Such was the strength of Auckland rugby league that they had 3 teams operating at the same time and the team Paki was in charge of was statistically the weakest of the 3 with the other two sides laden with Auckland and New Zealand players. The team touring the West Coast and Canterbury had 5 Kiwi players, the team staying in Auckland had Bill Davidson, Eric Grey, Charles Woolley, Thomas McClymont, Bill Walsh, Bill Williams, Sam Lowrie, Wally Smers, Joe Meadows, Bert Avery, and Arthur Singe, all New Zealand representatives. While Paki's team had just Craddock Dufty and Paki as their most accomplished players.

After the New Zealand side returned home Paki rejoined his City side who had won the Auckland club championship for the first time since 1916. Paki played in their 3 Roope Rooster knockout competition matches which they won over Newton Rangers, Ponsonby United, and Maritime 30–14 in the final. Paki then finished his season in City's Challenge Shield match against Ponsonby on October 15 which saw City wrest the trophy from the holders Ponsonby with a 25–10 victory.

The 1922 season was the busiest of Paki's career in terms of matches played. He played 15 times for City who again won the championship and defended the Challenge Shield 3 times. They were however defeated in the Roope Rooster semi final. Paki scored 8 tries during the season for City and kicked possibly the only goal of his career in a 43–13 win over Huntly in their final Challenge Shield match on October 28.

=== New Zealand Māori selection ===
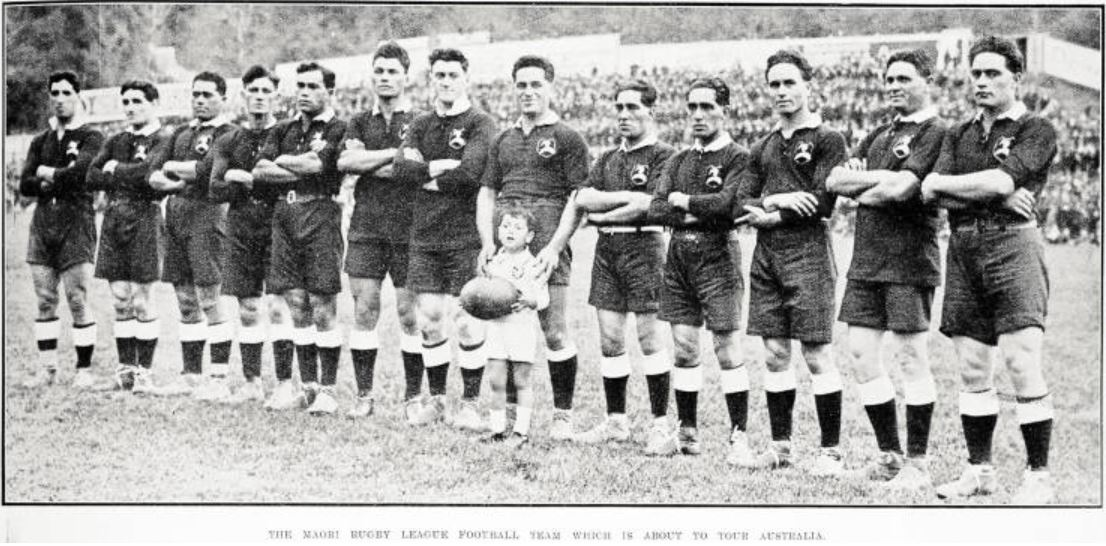
Paki, on the extreme left in the NZ Māori team to play Auckland at Carlaw Park on May 20, 1922.

In the middle of the season Paki was selected to play for the New Zealand Māori side on their tour of Australia. He played for the side against Auckland prior to their departure at Carlaw Park in a match they won 28-18 after the side had received a lot of criticism for a poor quality trial match a week earlier. Their first match in Australia was against a very strong Sydney Metropolitan side and they were thrashed 77–13 in front of 35,000 at the Sydney Cricket Ground. Paki played at fullback with Huatahi captaining the side in the centres. The team badly lacked combination as the actual playing side was reasonably strong featuring current or future Kiwi internationals such as Craddock Dufty, Sam Lowrie, Bill Te Whata, and George Gardiner. After the defeat New Zealand Māori were supposed to be playing the full New South Wales side but due to the lopsided score in the first match it was decided to field a New South Wales B team without any of their Australian internationals. Nonetheless the Māori side still suffered a 31–14 defeat with Paki playing in the second row. There was still an enormous crowd on hand with 30,000 present at the Sydney Cricket Ground once more. Paki's next game was against Ipswich on June 14 in what was the 5th match of the tour. They went down 20 points to 3 with Paki again playing in the second row. In front of 22,000 at the Sydney Cricket Ground Paki played centre in a 38–0 loss to the Sydney Metropolitan team on June 26. They then finished their tour at Wade Park in Orange against the Orange side. Paki scored a try in a 25–15 win before the team returned home.

Paki re-joined his City side for their Round 9 match against the Fire Brigade side and played all 11 of their remaining matches. If 1922 was a busy year for Paki then 1923 was the opposite. He only played in two rugby league matches in the entire year, both for City in rounds 4 and 7. In 1924 he transferred to the Richmond Rovers club at the beginning of the season. He debuted for them on May 3 against Mangere at the Auckland Domain. He was to only play 4 matches for them in the months of May, June, and July. Then in 1925 he moved back to the City club where he played 11 matches and helped City win the championship once again. He scored one try and was also part of the side which lost the Roope Rooster final and the Stormont Shield match losing to Ponsonby on both occasions.

In 1926 he didn't take the field for City but was named in the emergency players for the last few rounds of the championship and the final against Ponsonby. This was not to be quite the end of his playing career however as in 1932 he was named in a City Rovers "old timers" side to play the Ponsonby equivalent with the match drawn 3-3.

== Personal life and death ==
He married Myrtle Ruby Maisie Peters in February 1918 and they had a daughter (Joyce Pare Rawhiti Paki) on January 27, 1919. They had a separation agreement in 1929 and had lived apart from 1928 to 1933 before being officially divorced in 1933. George Paki remarried in 1934 to Nance Ada Moon and it appears they did not have any children. Paki was aged 41 by this time.

Paki's daughter Joyce married George Te Rarirari o Waikato Maipi and they had one child, Marama Nancy Maipi who married Joseph Hetekia Matatahi. Paki's brother Wetere had a son in 1927, Whatumoana Paki who married the Māori Queen, Te Atairangikaahu in 1952.

In December, 1966 George's father Hori made a donation to the Waikato University Halls of Residence to celebrate his 101st birthday. He is shown in an article on the gift in a photograph with George and other family members.

He died on April 12, 1974, aged 80 and was buried at Waikumete Cemetery in Glen Eden, Auckland. His wife Nance died on July 28, 2004, aged 93.

Former Kiwi, Lance Hohaia is George Paki's great grand nephew.
