= Joe Meadows =

New Zealand international rugby league footballer

Personal information
- Full name: Joseph Meadows
- Born: 1898; New Zealand
- Died: Deceased

Playing information
- Position: Hooker
Club
Years	Team	Pld	T	G	FG	P
1920	Athletic (WRL)
1921–22	Ponsonby United (ARL)	12	1	0	0	3
	Total	12	1	0	0	3
Representative
Years	Team	Pld	T	G	FG	P
1920	Wellington B
1921	New Zealand	2	0	0	0	0
1921–22	Auckland	2	0	0	0	0

Joseph Meadows was a New Zealand rugby league player. He played 2 matches for New Zealand in 1921 become Kiwi number 149.

== Playing career ==
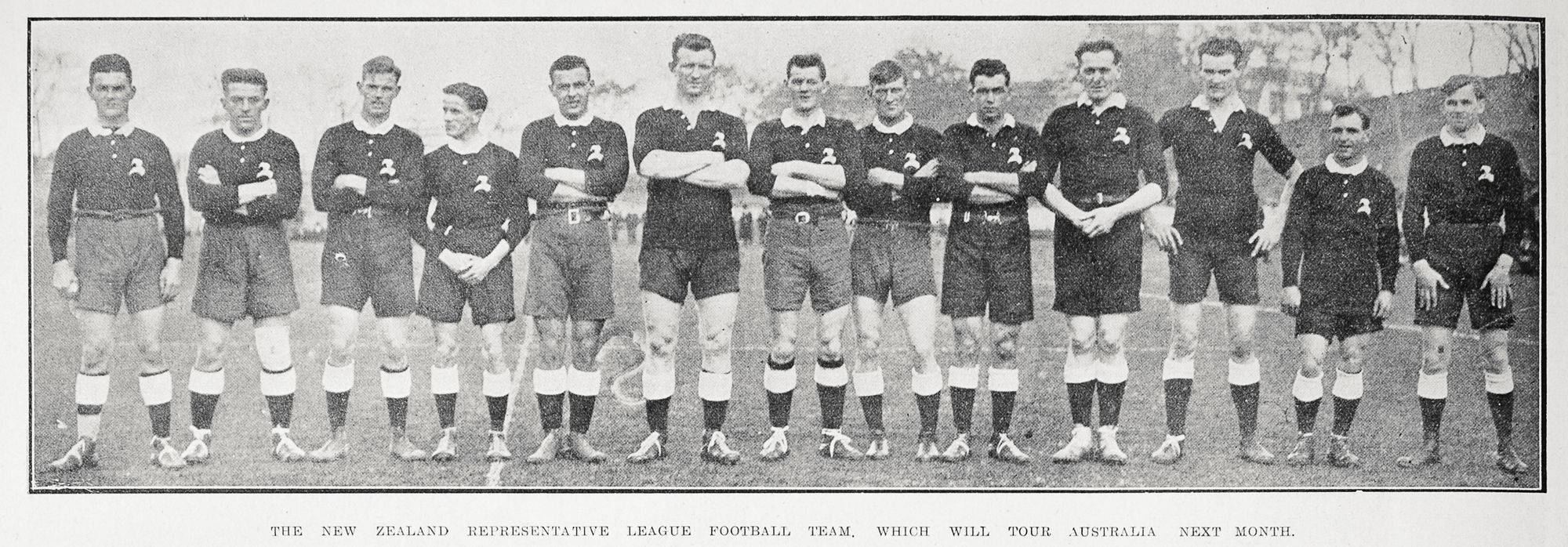
Meadows 3rd from the right in the 'New Zealand' team to play Auckland on May 21, 1921.

Joseph Meadows played rugby league in Wellington prior to moving to Auckland. In 1920 he was representing the Athletic club in the Wellington club competition and during the year he also made the Wellington B team for a match against Watersiders.

In 1921 he moved to Auckland and began playing for the Ponsonby United club where he was to play for 2 seasons. In that same year he made the New Zealand team to tour Australia. His first game for New Zealand was against the Auckland side prior to the departure for Australia. New Zealand won the match by 22 points to 16 with Meadows playing in the forwards. During the tour of Australia 8 matches were played in total however Meadows only played in one of them. This was the match with Toowoomba on June 22 at Athletic Oval in Toowoomba. Meadows played at hooker in a 30–18 loss to the local side.

After returning from the tour he played for Auckland against King Country. Auckland won the match by 58 points to 25. This was to be his only appearance in an Auckland jersey.

He again turned out for Ponsonby in the 1922 season. Meadows scored his one and only try for Ponsonby in a round 2 win over Athletic where they won by 23 points to 5. Meadows was last mentioned in a Ponsonby team in a round 11 match in July. Following the 1922 season it is unclear if he continued to play rugby league.
