= Parnell Rugby League Football Club =

Defunct NZ rugby league club, based in Auckland

Club information
- Full name: Parnell Rugby League Football Club
- Short name: Parnell
- Colours: Black and White
- Founded: 1918
- Exited: 1931

Former details
- Ground(s): Parnell Training Ground (1921-27); Auckland Domain (1928-31)
- Coach: Ralph Brockliss
- Captain: Richard Sloman
- Competition: Auckland Rugby League

Records

Parnell Rugby League Football Club were a rugby league club in Auckland. They competed from 1918 (though more officially 1921) until 1930 before amalgamating with City Rovers at the start of 1931. They represented the Parnell suburb in inner Auckland.

== History ==
=== 1918 Tentative start ===
Although the Parnell club did not officially form until 1921 they did in fact compete in the 1918 season, fielding two teams. Their sides were in the 4th and 6th grades. Prior to the start of the season they asked the Auckland Rugby League if they could affiliate with Grafton. It was decided to leave the arrangement to the Grafton club. The reason Parnell had asked to affiliate was that they had been late to register as a club. Parnell then tried to affiliate with Newton Rangers. The Auckland Star in reporting on the matter wrote the “Parnell Club requested permission to affiliate with Newton. Owing to nominations being closed, thus barring Parnell from entering teams, the Northcote club offered to forego their nominations in the 4th and 6th grade, so as to allow the Parnell club to participate in the competitions. Affiliation was then granted to the Parnell Club, and the offer of Northcote for the transference of nominations was referred to the Junior Advisory Board”. The New Zealand Herald then said that the league had granted affiliation with the Newton club.

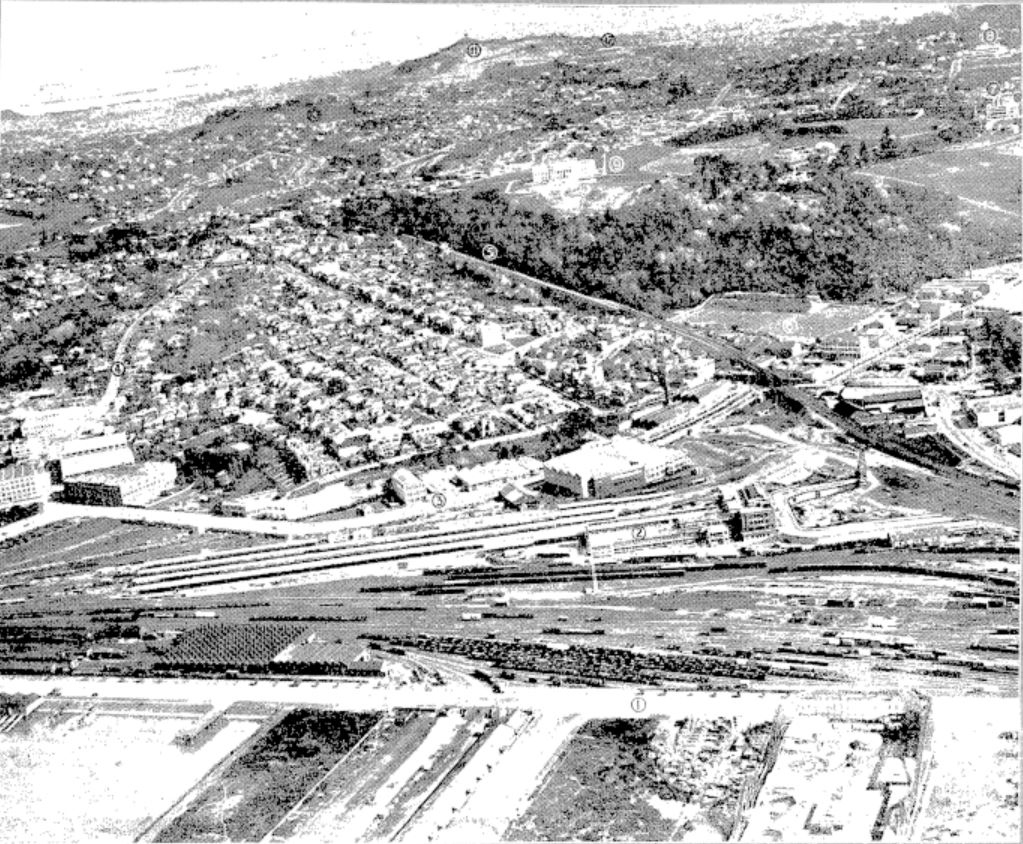
The suburb of Parnell in the centre with Carlaw Park to the right.

Parnell's first ever games were against City Rovers on May 4 at Victoria Park at 1pm (6th grade), and Grafton Athletic at the Auckland Domain at 3pm (4th grade). The 4th grade side to play in their first match was: Richardson, Freeth, Frye, Hales, Keenan, Hodgson, Gallagher, Lawrence, Baggstron, Bines, Chitty, McLure, Pemberton, Lownes, Crocker, Shorter, Harding, and Gedye. While the 6th grade side was: Hodgson, Simpson, Smith, Taylor, McKay, Peters, Johnston, Packman, Iverson, Green, Kelly, Molloy, Brown, Meehan, Fowler, and Bethell. The 4th grade side lost to Grafton 11 to 8, and the 6th grade side lost to City 3 to 0. The matches were preseason games and the competition did not properly start until 2 weeks later on May 18 with the 4th grade team losing to Sunnyside 12–6 at the Devonport Domain and the 6th grade side losing to City 11–0 at Victoria Park. The results for the lower grade competitions were not consistently reported with the 4th grade side losing all 5 of their games where the score was reported while 3 other scores were not reported. They withdrew from the competition after 9 rounds. The 6th grade side only had 6 results reported from 15 games, showing a win, a draw, and 4 losses. Their win was against Richmond Rovers by 6 points to 0 on June 8.

The club did not field any teams in the 1919 season or the 1920 season.

=== 1921 Parnell League Football Club ===
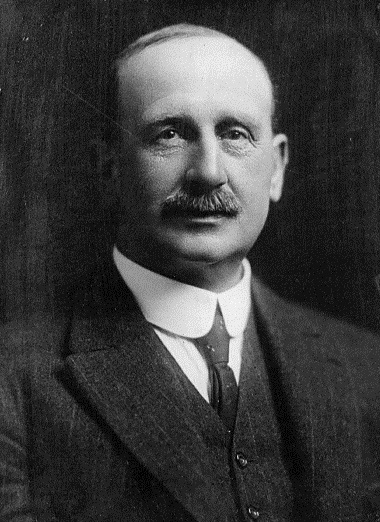
Arthur Myers, their first patron in 1921. He was an M.P. and had previously been mayor of Auckland.

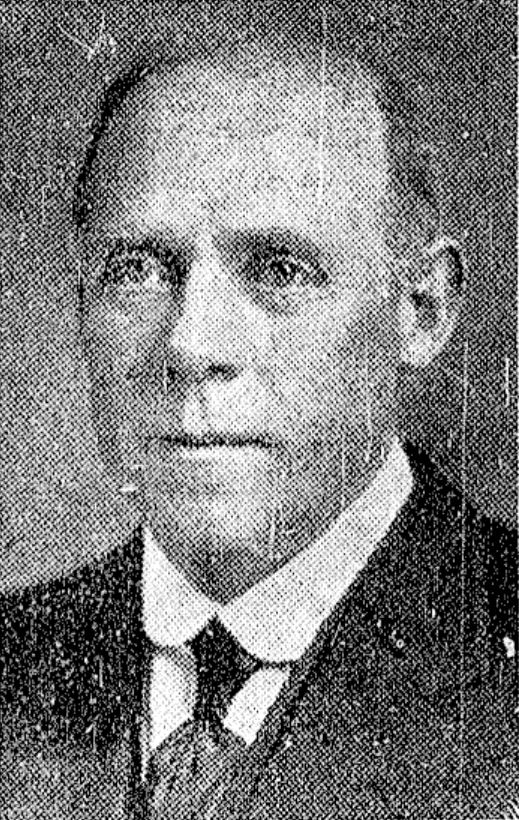
James Samuel Dickson, M.P. for Parnell and their first vice-president

The Parnell rugby league club formed as a stand-alone entity on July 7, 1921. The first annual meeting was held in the Carlaw Park meeting rooms with “about 60 attending”. The following were elected officers:- Patron, Hon. A. Myers, M.P.; president, Mr. H. Aisken; vice presidents: Messrs. J.S. Dickson, M.P.; J.J. Sullivan, T. Markwick, J. Keenan, Harry Donovan, and J. Smith; chairman, Mr. Archibald Roy Turner; vice-chairman, Mr. Cameron; committee, Messrs. Gordan Percival Graydon, A. Keenan, H. Holt, G.W. Green, E. Gallaugher, Thomas Edward Cargill, and D.B. Stock. Arthur Myers was the M.P. for the Auckland East electorate at this time and had been the mayor of Auckland from 1905 to 1909. While James Samuel Dickson was the M.P. for Parnell from 1911 to 1928. The 1921 season was in its later stages and the club entered teams in the 4th grade competition, and 2 sides in the 6th grade A and B competitions. They played their first game against Kingsland Rovers on July 16 in the 4th grade at Grey Lynn Park at 3pm, while their 6th grade B side played Richmond at Grey Lynn Park also at 2pm. In August they also entered a 3rd grade side which drew 3–3 with Ellerslie United on August 13.

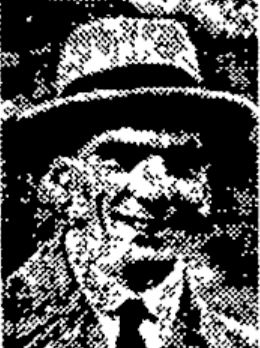
Gordan Seagar who was involved in the club in its infancy.

On August 30 they held a Euchre and Dance evening at St. Benedict's Hall with their honorary secretary, Gordon Huia Seagar publishing the newspaper notice. Seagar was the younger brother of George Seagar and older brother of Allan Seagar who both played rugby league for New Zealand. Then on October 30 the club held their annual picnic on Motutapu Island, travelling there by ferry.

==== Ladies sides (Parnell Pioneers and Parnell Rivals) ====
Remarkably considering the club was in its infancy they embarked on a bold effort to form and field women's teams. They very nearly managed to do so however officials with the Auckland Rugby League shut it down. On July 11 the club posted an advertisement which stated “Parnell Ladies League Football Club, A meeting of ladies will be held in the Methodist Hall, Manukau Road, Parnell (a few doors below Murray's Chemist), at 8 p.m. on Tuesday, July 12. All lady enthusiasts invited to attend. Archibald Turner, founder of the Parnell Club, will preside”.

The meeting saw a large number of ladies attend and it was decided to play a match between two teams named the "Parnell Pioneers" and the "Parnell Rivals" at Carlaw Park on July 16 as curtain raiser to the Roope Rooster 1st grade men's games. Over 40 young ladies enrolled, with the majority aged from 16 to 20. They would play two quarters and wear the black and white jerseys of Parnell. It was said that a dozen more offered their services in other capacities. The Herald wrote “there was an English girl who had played “soccer” for the famous “Lyons” team in London, a public school teacher, several school girls, and a number of working girls. They were, on the whole, neat and well built, with an appearance that suggested speed and nippy play more than weight”. While the Auckland Star said a silver shield “similar to the Monteith Shield competed for by the men, had been donated, and members of the Auckland league management committee had donated a football, and were providing assistance in supplying jerseys”.

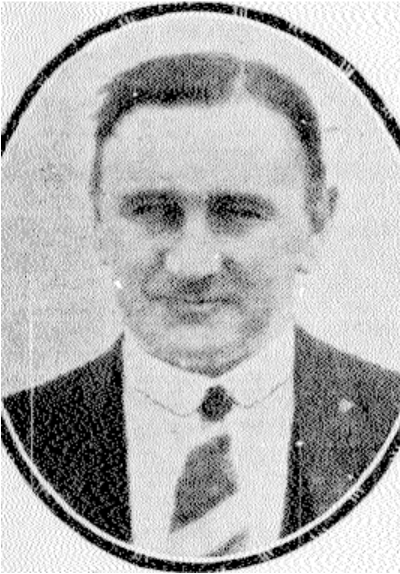
Ivan Culpan, long serving secretary of the ARL

A set of caps had also been donated to be awarded to the winning side while Ivan Culpan, the ARL secretary explained “that the league wished to provide instruction every evening this week, so that the girls would make a good showing in their initial effort”. Mr. E. Stallworthy, a member of the management committee had offered to coach the team and he advised the girls to “breast up to the barrier and not be timid”, with one girl replaying “no fear we won’t”. They placed “four matrons in charge” to “supervise the girls”. They were Mrs. E. McDowell, Mrs. G.W. Green, Mrs. Evelyn Schulze, and Mrs. Tate while club officers were to be elected at a meeting the following night on July 13. At the end of the July 12 meeting a demonstration of play was made on “a model field”.

In the meantime there was discussion in the medical community about whether females should be playing rugby union or rugby league at all. A female team had formed in Wellington to play rugby union though had not yet played, while another was proposed for Christchurch. The Star newspaper had approached “several Christchurch medical men” and all of them had said that females should not be playing the contact sports as it “would prove prejudicial to their future health”. On July 13 at the Auckland Rugby League meeting they decided to “defer the application of the Parnell Ladies’ League Club for affiliation until a sub-committee had interviewed local doctors, and the league had thus been put in possession of medical advice upon the matter”. James Carlaw, chairman of the league said “it had apparently been taken for granted that the ladies would play a match on Saturday as a curtain raiser to the men’s game. That was unfortunate, because the true facts of the position were that some officers of the league had attended the meeting of lady enthusiasts in Parnell, and had given information. But they were not there in any official capacity, and the proposal to have a ladies’ club, and to have the ladies play a game, was now officially before the league for the first time”. Carlaw himself was initially against the idea though wished to consider it more while George Hunt thought “football as played by men was far too strenuous a game for girls”, and Ted Phelan said “football was not the proper game for women, who were not built right for such a strenuous pastime”. Carlaw then said “it would be a terrible judgment upon the league if they granted the ladies’ teams permission to play, and then one of the girls was killed or seriously injured”.

In the meantime the ladies had been practising on Parnell borough reserve which was situated opposite Campbell Park. Observers noted “tackling low was noticeable by its absence. The result of this, the first essay of the ladies, is not known, but the contestants seemed to thoroughly enjoy the outing. Blouses and bloomers were the prevailing costumes affected, and apparently the much discussed “shorts” are still too much of an innovation. There was a referee on the ground, and line umpires were also in evidence, but the control of the game was not by any means arbitrary”. Days later, on July 20 the Auckland Rugby League officially put an end to any hopes of the ladies being able to play under their oversight. Both sides put forward their arguments but “the request was declined”. Speaking for the right for the ladies to play was “a matron, two girls, together with male members of the Parnell club”. A member of their deputation said “they had already held a practice match in which 64 scrums were held, and were convinced that the game under the suggested modified rules was suitable for girls”.

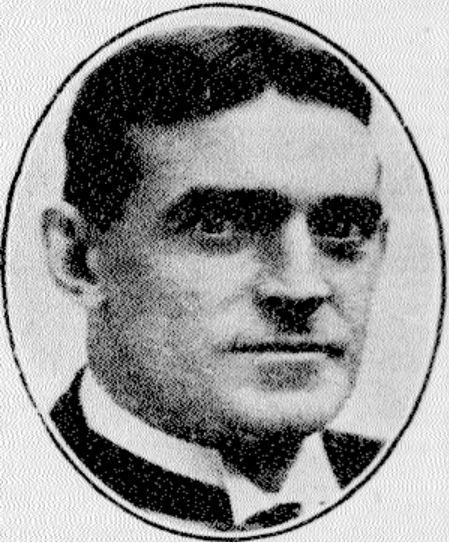
Archie Ferguson, who was a prominent referee and administrator who spoke in support of women playing.

Also Mr. Archie Ferguson, president of the referees committee accompanied them and “explained the modifications of the game… he said tackling, charging, scrum work and playing the ball rules had been altered so as to prevent the rough and tumble of the game”. In the past week more members had joined and their numbers were now up to 65 and it was remarked that girls who were currently playing soccer “were anxious to take up the league game and that girls at Onehunga were practising in anticipation of entering a competition”. Mr Fielding on the committee thought that a trial game could be played under the modified rules with doctors invited to witness the game, however after discussion under committee the amendment was lost on the votes, and the motion that the request of the deputation be declined was carried”.

On August 23 the ladies held a special meeting at “the Matron’s Home, No. 8 Constitution Hill” to discuss a match with Canterbury who were based in Christchurch. The Parnell ladies honorary secretary who published the notice of the meeting was G.W. Green. Over the remainder of the year they continued to meet and held euchre and dance evenings at St. Benedicts Hall, East Street, featuring Hawthorne's Orchestra. Their honorary secretary, T. Cargill advertised for a general meeting of the “Parnell Ladies’ League Football Club” on October 27 at the Parnell Methodist Schoolroom. Then at the start of the 1921 season they held their second annual meeting at Newmarket Hall on April 20. The outcome of the meeting was not reported and they were not mentioned again with interest likely waning with no official fixtures or competition for them to play in.

=== 1922 Member growth ===
The 1922 season saw Parnell field teams in the 3rd, 4th, and 6th B grades. The 3rd grade team won 4 of their 9 matches that had scores reported and finished mid table, the 4th grade team also finished in the middle of the standings with 4 wins from 10 reported games. Their 6th grade team in the B section only had 7 results reported and won 3 and lost 4 of those. Their second annual meeting has been held at the Methodist Hall on Manukau Road in Parnell on March 1 with G.H. Seagar their honorary secretary at the time the meeting was being organised.

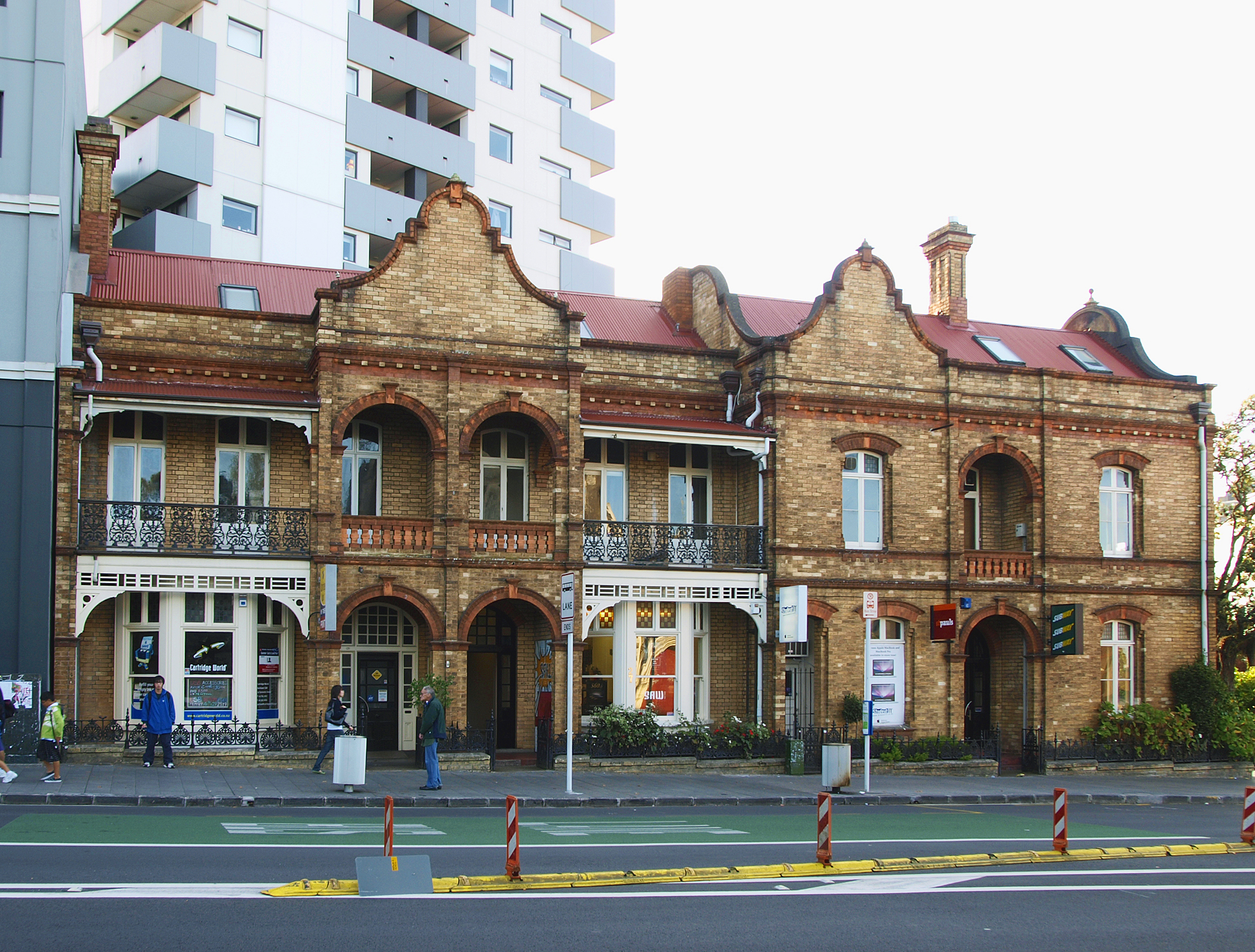
The Endean family house in Symonds Street, Auckland, built in circa 1897

Following the meeting it was reported that many new players had been enrolled and they had initially hoped to field 5 teams and enter a side in the senior grade. They had also been trying to entice players in the Newmarket area to join the club. It was planned to organise a working bee to make a new playing ground at Campbell's Point, where a practice match would be played on March 25. Their officers elected for the year were: Patron, Mr. John Albert Endean; president, Mr. H. Asken; vice presidents, Messrs. S. Donaldson, J. Cleave, A. Secombe, E. Sullivan, G. Green, L. Heard, J. Keenan, R. Lewis, G. Johnstone, T. Watts, J. Pound, P.R. Colebrook, J.S. Bringham, J.L. Scott, P. Philcox, R. Martin; chairman, Mr. A.R. Turner; hon. secretary, Mr. G. Seagar; club captain, Mr. G. Cameron; treasurer, Mr. F. Hunter; committee, Messrs. G.P. Graydon, W. Western, W. Porter, J. Boyle, J. Western, P. Auger, C. Clark, F. Jagger, L. Smith, S. Davies, A. Riley”. Their patron, John Albert Endean was the son of John Endean who had "made money" gold mining overseas. He lived in the family house which still exists on Symonds Street.

=== 1923 Four teams ===
In 1923 Parnell fielded 4 teams, 1 more than the previous season. They had teams in the 3rd grade, 4th grade, and 2 teams in the 6th grades (1 in the A and 1 in the B section). Their 3rd grade side came mid table, while the 4th grade side had a good year winning most of their games to finish around 3rd in an 11 team competition. Their 6th grade team in the A section finished towards the bottom of the table while the team in the B section won 8 and lost 4 of their games with a draw in another to finish near the top of the table. In February they held a meeting once again looking at forming a senior grade side. It was at the rugby league meeting rooms on Swanson Street with A.R. Turner still chairman, and J. Tilton the secretary. They met again on March 22 at the same venue to hold their annual meeting. On June 4 they had a “Grand Concert And Dance” in “aid of equipment fund” at St. Mark's Hall in Remuera. At the conclusion of the season the club went to Brown's Island (Motukorea) on Sunday, December 9.

=== 1924 ===
At their annual meeting in 1924 Parnell saw a “very large attendance”. They elected John A. Lee as their patron. He was a very prominent socialist in New Zealand and a Labour Party M.P. from 1919 to 1940. Other officers elected were Mr. H. Askin as president, Archibald Ray Hoyte Turner (chairman), vice chairman was Mr. J. Weston, F. Hunter (treasurer), J. Tilton (hon. secretary), and Tilton was also the delegate to the junior management committee. For the 3rd consecutive season the club tried to form a senior team and on February 20 they held a meeting looking for prospective players. A meeting for juniors looking to join the club was then held on February 28. They met once more in mid March at Newmarket Hall on King Street with a request for all intending players to attend. They ultimately fielded teams in the same grades as the previous season (3rd, 4th, and each of the 6th grade sections). The 3rd grade team had 8 results reported of which they won 6 to finish near the top of the competition. The 4th grade side won 4 of their reported 6 games while the two 6th grade teams finished mid table.

=== 1925 (3 Teams) ===
1925 saw a slight reduction in playing numbers with teams entered in the 3rd, 4th, and 5th grades however it was arguably their strongest year in terms of results to date. There was relatively little coverage of specific details of the club other than an advertisement for all players to weigh in at Carlaw Park on April 19 and for a practice on the following Saturday. In the 3rd grade competition the Parnell side won 6 matches and lost 6 matches with 4 results not reported. Their 4th grade side had a very good season finishing 2nd in a 12 team competition. They had 10 wins and 4 losses with 2 other results not reported. The noticeable thing about their season was their high scoring. They won games 16–0, 13–0, 35–5, 44–0, 33–0, 37–0, 34–3, 18–2, and 21–0 in amongst their handful of defeats. They made it to the semi final of the knockout competition where they lost to Athletic on October 3. Two of their 4 losses came at the hands of the Richmond Rovers side which went through the season undefeated (8-9 and 3–13). The Parnell 5th grade team also performed well winning 5 of their 7 games which had results reported. They lost the knockout final to City Rovers by 16 points to 13 on October 3 which was played as a curtain raiser to the game between Auckland Province and Queensland.

=== 1926 Entry in B Division (Seniors) and first title ===
The 1926 season was historic for the club for they managed to field a senior team for the first time. The side played in the newly formed B Division. They also fielded sides in the 3rd grade intermediate competition and the 4th grade. The clubs annual meeting was held at Donovan's Gymnasium on March 9. The gym was a well known facility in the Parnell area with the Donovan family heavily involved in rugby league in its formative decades. Harry Donovan ran the gym and had been on Parnell's committee in 1921. The meeting showed the club was financially stable with a “credit balance of £9 12/, and assets valued at £58 8/, a total of £68”. At the meeting they decided to enter a team in the “senior B grade competition” with practice commencing on the following Saturday. Their officers for the season were: President, Mr. John A. Lee, M.P.; vice presidents, Messrs. Meehan, Rushton, Heard, Peters, McHugh, Petrie, White, Waite, Miller, Muller, Varella, Hunter, Green, Jones, Davies, Holt; hon. secretary, Archibald Turner; delegate to Junior Management Committee, Mr. L. Hilburn; committee, Messrs. Turner, Hunter, Hilburn, Ghent, Pearson, Cocayne, Lawrence, Davies, and Simpson. The club held a practice in mid April at their ground at Campbell's Point followed by a meeting.

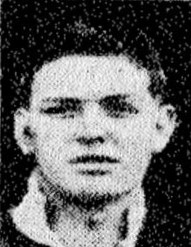
Stan Clark who would transfer to City Rovers and go on to represent New Zealand in 1930.

The senior side struggled winning just 3 of their 12 games and finishing last of the 6 teams although they were relatively competitive in nearly all of their matches. In Round 6 Parnell defaulted to Ellerslie with the club secretary saying "the fact that five men are on the injured list and that others have had to leave town to seek work in the country were the chief factors". Stan Clark played for them and would later transfer to the City Rovers in 1929 to experience first grade football and from there he was selected for New Zealand in 1930, going on to play 9 matches for them over 3 years. Their first ever 'senior' match was played against Ellerslie United on April 24 on the No. 2 field at the Auckland Domain and refereed by Les Bull, one of the most prominent referees of the era. Their side was named: Herbert, Brockliss, Southwell, Clark, Griffiths, Hooker (2), Robinson, Binns, Nelson, Lawrence, Faulkner (2), Payne, Patton, Wilson, Smith, Worms, Russell, Perry, Simpson, and White.

Their 3rd grade intermediate side saw few results reported, winning 3, losing 2 with 3 other results unknown however they withdrew from the competition after July 17. Their 4th grade side went one better in 1925, winning the competition with 12 wins, 1 draw, and 1 loss from their 14 games. Once again they outscored their opponents heavily most weeks. Their team which was named to play in their opening game on May 1 was Meehan, Loft, Leek, Walsh, Pearson, Tate, Simpson, Sloman, Herring, Clapham, Clough, Stewart, Collins, and Callender.

The club also fielded a schoolboys team. The Parnell school was situated at the site of the present day Fraser Park, close to the old Carlaw Park site. It was later demolished due to its unsuitability for a school and rebuilt at the present day site on St Stephens Avenue where the St Stephens Māori school had been situated. They themselves also sought a more suitable site and moved to Bombay, south of present day urban Auckland. The schoolboys side played 5 matches, winning 2 and losing 3 in a somewhat informal competition with sides joining as the weeks went by. On October 7 the Auckland Star published a letter by Parnell secretary stating: “In reference to Mr. Frank Murphy's [headmaster of the school] letter on school boys playing league football, and on refusal to recognise same, I have to note the contents, and in reply I wish to state that I interviewed the master and he raised no objections, mentioning, however, that he would not be a party to consenting to the boys playing. I then saw some of the boys who were eager to play league, and the game was then arranged. Mr. Murphy’s letter does not alter the fact that the majority of the boys in the school team that played against Otahuhu were the same boys that played rugby union all this season.

=== 1927 ===
Ironically after their most successful season the Parnell club only fielded 2 sides in the 1927 competitions. They were in the B Division and 3rd grade intermediate competitions. Their B Division team won 3 games, drew 1, and lost 7 to finish 4th in the 7 team competition. It featured two very strong sides in Ellerslie and Kingsland with Northcote & Birkenhead Ramblers also competitive, and 4 other clubs who struggled somewhat, though the majority of Parnell's losses were by extremely narrow margins. They scored 103 points and conceded 131. Parnell were defeated by Kingsland Rovers 13-8 in the knockout competition with Kingsland having finished runners up in the championship weeks earlier. Their annual meeting was at Donovan's Gymnasium once more on March 17 at 7.45pm. John A. Lee presided over the meeting with "a large attendance". It was said that “financially the club was in a strong position, there being a credit balance of £18 7s. Assets amounted to £69”. Parnell's officers elected for the season were: Patron, Mr. H. A. Lee M.P.; chairman, Mr. F. Hunter; honorary secretary, Archibald Turner; treasurer, Mr. G.H. Davies; delegate to Auckland, Mr. P. Barry; delegate to Junior Management Committee, Mr. L. Heilburn; committee, Messrs. Ralph Brockliss, Wilson, Thompson, O'Brian, Anderson; vice-presidents, same as last year, with power to add; club captain, deferred until next meeting. The club held a practice on April 9 at their ground at Campbell's Point at 2 pm. It was reported that in a practice match that W. Riley had badly injured his shoulder and would “be incapacitated for some weeks”. On July 9 the Parnell senior side travelled to Rotorua and played the local side, winning 27–3. The Sun newspaper reported that “the Parnell team had a splendid trip to the hot pools centre last weekend making the journey by The Sun service car, which landed them back on Sunday night, in plenty of time to start work again bright and early on Monday morning”. They went on to say that Turner of the Parnell club said “they have first-class material in Rotorua, and it only wants a few more visits from metropolitan sides to give the Rotorua men a bit more experience, and they will take a lot of beating”. They also hoped to visit Rotorua again before the end of the season.

Their 3rd grade side won 3 games, drew 1 and lost 4, but had 9 results unreported so it is unknown how they fared overall.

=== 1928 ===
The 1928 season saw Parnell once again only field 2 teams, in the B Division and 3rd grade competition. As Auckland continued to grow the number of young people living in the central Auckland area proportionally reduced so they would have had a reduced pool of young players compared to other suburbs. Their senior team was coached by W. Little and finished 5th in the 7 team B Grade competition which now competed for the Norton Cup. Parnell's season started promisingly with a win over Māngere United 13 to 5, a 12–12 draw with eventual champions Grafton Athletic, and then wins over Point Chevalier (14-8), and Northcote & Birkenhead Ramblers (7-5). The first match of the season against Māngere was on the number 2 field at Carlaw Park which was of course situated in the suburb of Parnell. The majority of their home matches were played on the Auckland Domain or the ‘Outer Domain’ section of it which is adjacent to the museum. They then fell away though losing 5 straight games and ultimately finished with a 4 win, 1 draw, 6 loss season. They also lost their first game in the knockout competition to Point Chevalier 13–6 on September 22. Their 3rd grade team withdrew from the competition after defaulting their 11th round match despite having been competitive to that point, finishing with 4 wins and a draw along with 4 losses.

The annual meeting was at “Donovan’s Gymnasium, 1st section, Parnell” once more, on March 15. The meeting showed a cash balance of £30 2/11, and assets of £57 10/. The club unfortunately lost their ground due to the council creating an outlet road for eastern traffic which went through the property. The club was now forced to make arrangements to use the Auckland Domain for training purposes. The officers elected for the season were: Patron, Mr. John A. Lee, M.P.; vice presidents, same as last year, with four added; chairman, Mr. T. Wells; treasurer, Mr. George Davies; hon. secretary, Mr. G. Smith; senior delegate to Auckland Rugby League, Mr. P. Barry; junior delegate, Mr. L. Heilburn; club captain, Mr. Ralph Brockliss; coach, Mr. W. Little; committee, Messrs. Wells, Turner, George Davies, Brockliss, Stan Clark, W. Little, Richard Sloman, McArthur, Ritchie, McLure, and Anderson. (Leo) Ralph Brockliss has previously played for Newton Rangers senior side earlier in the decade and was now aged 30. His son, Morris (Morrie) Brockliss played for Marist in the 1940s. The club advertised that trainings at the start of the season would be on the Domain, Tuesday and Thursday at 7.30pm.

=== 1929 One team ===
By 1929 Parnell was only able to field one team. They were their B Division team and they finished second to last in the championship winning just two of their 10 games. Both of their wins came against the last placed Māngere United. In the Stallard Cup played after the championship they lost 3 games, had a match postponed and then forfeited their final game of the season. Their annual meeting had been held at Donovan's Gymnasium on March 14 with their honorary secretary still A.R. Turner. The club had a credit balance of £25 and chairman George Davies presided over the annual meeting. Their patron was John A. Lee once more, with others elected being: chairman, Mr. George Davies; treasurer, Mr. George Davies; secretary, Mr. A.R. Turner; delegate to A.R.L., Mr. George Davies; coach Mr. Ralph Brockliss; club captain, Mr. Richard (Dick) Arthur Sloman; committee, Messrs. Hosking, Ritchie, Clark, Peachey, Brockliss, Sloman, O’Donnell, and Pearson. Ralph Brockliss had moved from captaining the side to being their coach with Richard (Dick) Sloman becoming captain. He had played for Parnell for several years and was in their 6th grade team in 1921 before progressing to the senior side of 1927. The senior side held a practice at the start of the season at Carlaw Park. At the end of the season the side travelled to Huntly to play the local side. They lost 24–16 with their standout players being Hine and Anderson.

=== 1930 Partnership with Akarana ===
The 1930 season saw Parnell field a team in the B Division again but they also joined forces with the Akarana club to field teams in the 3rd intermediate, 4th, and 5th grades. The senior side only fared slightly better than the previous year, winning 4 of its 12 games (2 more than 1929) to finish second to last once more.

As in previous years the annual meeting was at Donovan's Gymnasium in Parnell with Archibald Turner continuing in the position of honorary secretary. The meeting was held on March 10. At the meeting a vote of thanks was given to George Davies who had been their senior delegate to the ARL. He was resigning to take up a place in the neighbouring Newmarket league club. It was mentioned that the club had made a practice of sending a team away each year and that they had given “a good account of themselves”. They had a cash balance of £30 in the bank and gear to the value of £11. It was also said that many new members had joined the club and the “outlook for the 1930 season is very promising”. The election of officers saw positions go to John A. Lee who was again patron; chairman, Mr. F. Hunter; secretary and treasurer, Archibald Turner; delegate to ARL, Mr. T. Wells; club captain, Richard Sloman; coach, Ralph Brockliss.

The combined junior sides with Akarana did well. The 3rd grade intermediate team won 6 and drew 1 of their 12 games to finish mid table, while the 4th grade team won 12 games, drew 3, and lost 5 of their matches to finish second in a 12 team competition. Their 5th grade side won 5 of their 14 games to finish low on the table.

The club held fortnightly dances at the Municipal Hall in Newmarket. At the June 4 evening the music was provided by Walter Smith's Orchestra who were performing “Old-Time and Jazz”.

At the end of the season the team travelled to Hikurangi in a ‘party of 20’. They went by motorcar and played a Northland side on October 11. The players to travel were McLaren, Richard Sloman, O’Donnell, Kerr-Stipney, Iverson, Perry, Alderton, Maher, Green, Ellis, Jones, Shortland, Bracegirdle, Reid, G. Munce, and Ragg, and were accompanied by Archibald Turner. The match was played on Hikurangi Recreation Park with the Northland City team assembled at fairly shirt notice. Willie Shortland and Perry from the Parnell side played for the local team. The Northland side won 25–12 in an open encounter which was said to be the best passing and handling effort seen in the area that season. The Northland side was fairly strong and included several members of the areas full Northland representative team including Rod Hamilton, Claude Hamilton, N Dunn, J. Crackett, Eddie Cunningham, E O’Callaghan, and C O’Callaghan.

=== 1931 Amalgamation with City Rovers ===
On April 12 the club held a meeting for all “players and intending players” at Carlaw Park. It was reported in late April that the club had amalgamated with the City Rovers club and that several of their players would be strengthening the ranks of the City first grade side. The management committee of the ARL had been notified by the Parnell secretary, which was now Richard Sloman that the amalgamation had taken place. After the start of the season former Parnell players Kerr and Munce had both debuted for the City senior grade side in the Fox Memorial Shield competition. A.R. Turner became the manager of the City senior side in 1932, and then later in the same year he managed the Auckland team.

== Season records ==
=== Highest graded team in each season ===
Season	Grade	Name	Pld	W	D	L	PF	PA	PD	Pts	Position (Teams)
1918	4th Grade	Parnell	8	0	0	5	19	41	-22	0	9th of 9
1921	6th Grade A	Parnell	5	0	0	1	2	9	-7	0	Sixth (Six), only one result known
1922	3rd Grade (Myers cup)	Parnell	9	4	0	5	23	83	-60	8	Fifth (Eleven)
1923	3rd Grade (Myers Cup)	Parnell	12	3	0	5	45	46	-1	6	Seventh (Fourteen)
1924	3rd Grade	Parnell	8	6	0	2	119	32	+87	12	Third (Fourteen), many results unknown
1925	3rd Grade	Parnell	12	6	0	6	57	81	-24	12	Fourth (Seventeen)
1926	B Division	Parnell	14	3	0	12	76	149	-72	6	Sixth (Six)
1927	B Division (Norton Cup)	Parnell	12	3	1	7	103	131	-28	7	Fourth (Seven) One result unknown
1928	B Division (Norton Cup)	Parnell	12	4	1	7	118	127	-9	11	Fifth (Seven)
1929	B Division (Norton Cup)	Parnell	11	2	0	8	112	145	-33	4	Fifth (Six)
1930	Senior B	Parnell	12	4	0	8	68	138	-70	9	Sixth (Seven)
1918, 1921-30	Total		115	35	2	66	742	982	-240	75	
