= Jim Sanders (rugby league) =

New Zealand international rugby league footballer & coach

Personal information
- Full name: James Sanders
- Born: 1899; New Zealand
- Died: 1981 (aged 81–82)

Playing information
- Position: Wing, Centre, Stand-off
Club
Years	Team	Pld	T	G	FG	P
1917–31	Addington (CRL)
Representative
Years	Team	Pld	T	G	FG	P
	Canterbury
1919–25	New Zealand
1925–29	South Island

Coaching information
Club
Years	Team	Gms	W	D	L	W%
1931	Addington
Representative
Years	Team	Gms	W	D	L	W%
	Canterbury
	South Island

James Sanders (1900–1981) was a New Zealand rugby league player who represented New Zealand.

== Playing career ==
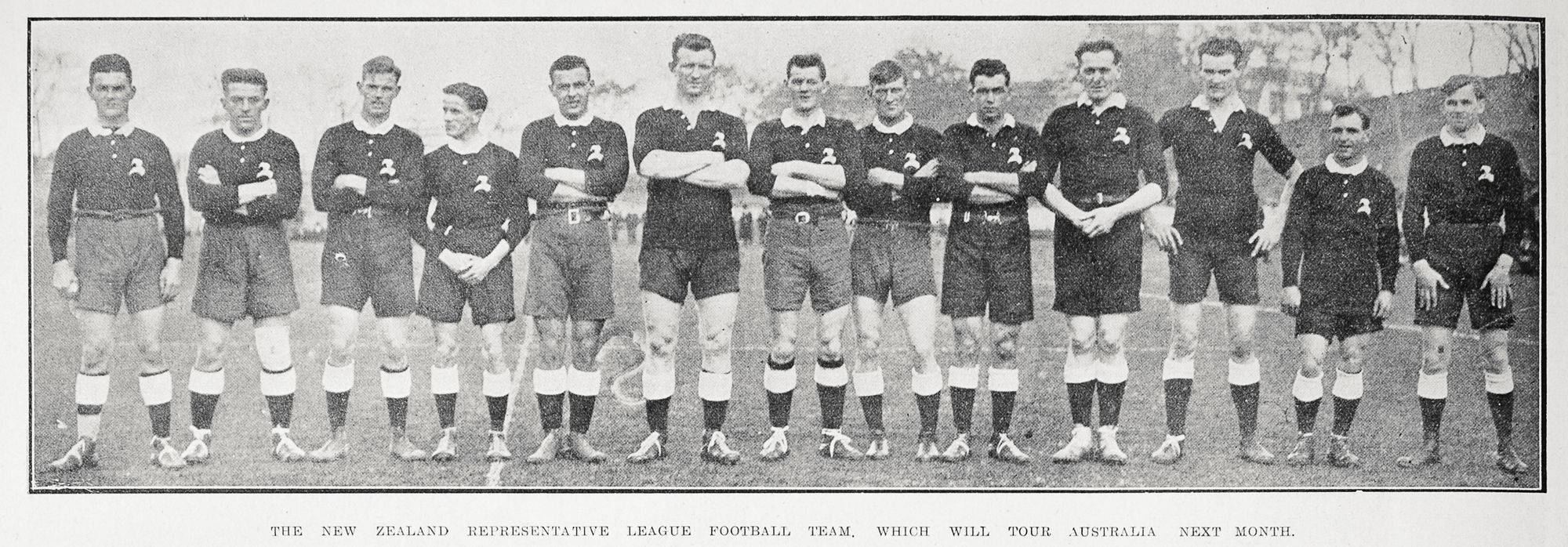
Sanders on the extreme right in the 'New Zealand' team to play Auckland at the Auckland Domain on 21 May 1921.

Sanders started his career in third grade with Addington in 1915. He spent his entire career with Addington apart from a few games for Hornby when Addington had no senior team. He captained Addington to their first title in 1923.

Sanders made his New Zealand debut in 1919 against Australia. In 1921 Sanders toured Australia for New Zealand under coach Jim Rukutai. He played for New Zealand in 1922 against New South Wales and was part of the 1926-1927 New Zealand tour of Great Britain that was marred by a players strike. He first played for the South Island in 1925 and in 1929 he captained them to their 23-13 victory over the North Island, the South Island's first.

Sanders rejected an offer from Halifax for the 1926-1927 season.

== Later years ==
Sanders coached Addington in 1931 and later coached Canterbury and the South Island. He also served as a South Island and New Zealand selector in the 1930s.
