= Huatahi 'Brownie' Paki =

NZ Maori international rugby league footballer

Brownie Paki
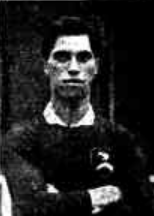

Personal information
- Full name: Huatahi Turoa Brown Paki
- Born: 16 June 1900 Huntly, Waikato, New Zealand
- Died: 20 March 1992 (aged 91) Huntly, Waikato, New Zealand

Playing information
- Height: 5 ft 10 in (1.78 m)
- Weight: 13 st 0 lb (83 kg)
- Position: Wing
Club
Years	Team	Pld	T	G	FG	P
1918–20	City Rovers	15	2	0	0	6
1920–21	Huntly	2	1	0	0	3
1923	St. George	15	3	0	0	9
	Total	32	6	0	0	18
Representative
Years	Team	Pld	T	G	FG	P
1920	Lower Waikato	1	0	0	0	0
1920	South Auckland (Waikato)	18	7	0	0	21
1922	New Zealand Māori	7	3	0	0	9
1922–24	Auckland	0	0	0	0	0
- Source: Whiticker/Huson
- Relatives: George Paki (brother)

Huatahi Turoa Brown 'Brownie' Paki (1900-1992) was a New Zealand rugby league footballer who played in the 1920s.

Born in Waikato, New Zealand in 1897, 'Brownie' Paki, he is remembered as one of the pioneers of Māori rugby league in New Zealand. He was captain of the Maori team that toured Australia in 1922. He captained the Auckland province team in 1922 and 1924 and Captain of the 1922 Maori touring team. His brother George Paki also played for New Zealand and played with and against him several times in his career.

== Career ==
Huatahi Paki joined his brother George Paki at the City Rovers club in 1918. George had been playing fullback there in 1917. Huatahi played on the wing and played in 13 matches, scoring 1 try. In 1919 he played one match for City scoring a try and in 1920 one further match.

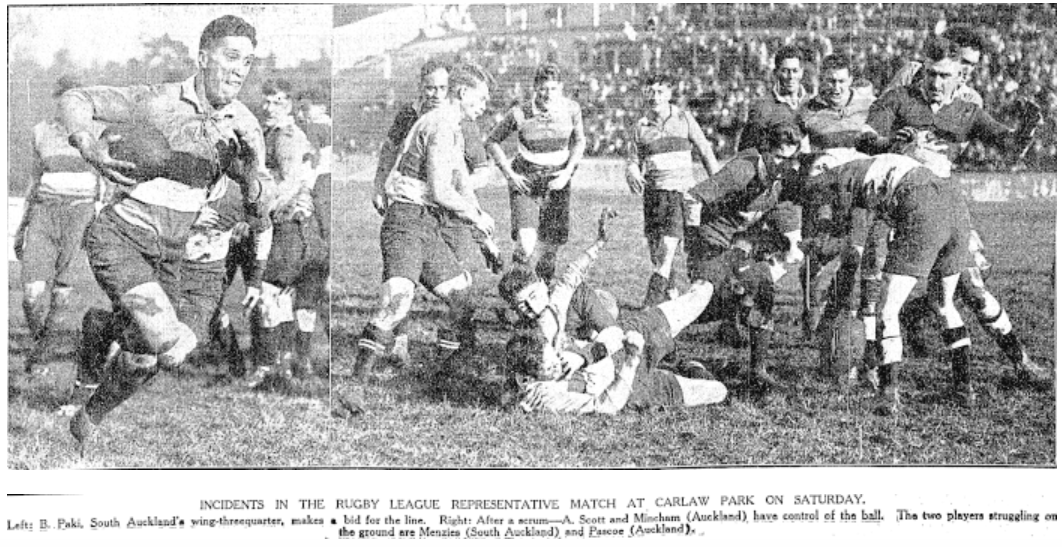

Originally lured to St. George by George Carstairs, 'Brownie' later recalled coming over to Sydney on the steamer, Marama and held with pride throughout his life that he played with St. George.

A popular personality, Paki was regarded as the first 'outsider' to be imported into Sydney football. In 2006, Mr Tim Manukau of Huntly (NZ) writes: Brownie was a very influential identity in the development of Māori Rugby League within the Waikato Region, as a player, administrator and an ambassador for the sport. In 1922 he represented the "Rest of Australia" against the Kangaroos and scored a memorable try in that match at the Sydney Cricket Ground. He continued to play in the South Auckland region throughout the 1920s.

== Later life ==
Brownie Paki assisted Tonga Mahuta in founding the Taniwharau Rugby League Club in Huntly, the very club that produced Kiwi league players such as Andy Berryman, Don Parkinson, Ricky Muru and most recently Wairangi Koopu and Lance Hohaia.
