= Bill Williams (rugby league) =

New Zealand international rugby league player (1899-1927)

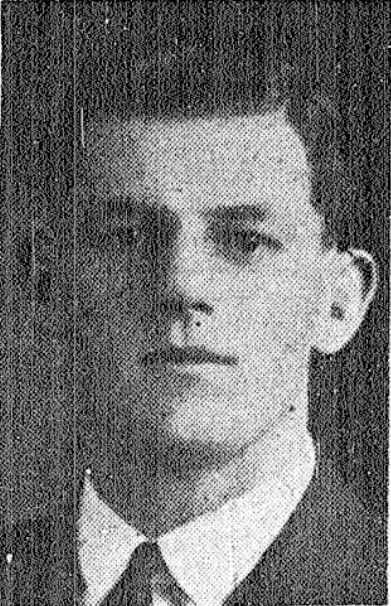

Personal information
- Full name: William Williams
- Born: 7 February 1899 Karangahake, Ohinemure, Waikato, New Zealand
- Died: 21 November 1927 (aged 28) Auckland

Playing information

Rugby league
- Position: Second-row, Hooker
Club
Years	Team	Pld	T	G	FG	P
1915–22	Newton Rangers (ARL)	53	14	2	0	46
Representative
Years	Team	Pld	T	G	FG	P
1918–21	Auckland	5	0	0	0	0
1919–21	New Zealand	21	4	0	0	12

Rugby union
Club
Years	Team	Pld	T	G	FG	P
1922	Ponsonby	8	0	0	0	0

Bill Williams (1899 – 21 November 1927) was Kiwi number 123. He played in 4 test matches for New Zealand debuting in 1919 and last playing for them in 1921. Williams played for the Newton Rangers club in Auckland from 1915 to 1924.

== Early life ==
William (Billy) Williams was born on 7 February 1898 in Karangahake, Ohinemure, Waikato. His father was also named William Williams (b.1870-1945) and his mother Emma (Ella) Josephine Houghton (1875-1934). He had an older brother, Stanley Williams (b.1896-1944), and two younger brothers, Morris Andrew Williams (b.1906-1974), and Bernard Clive Williams (b.1915-1939).

== Playing career ==
Williams was a forward and made his debut for the Newton Rangers senior team in 1915 aged just 16. Though in his initial games he played on the wing. With so many men going away to fight in the war the senior ranks became populated by very young players and older players as teams struggled to continue to field sides. Auckland played very few representative matches during the war years and he wasn’t to debut for Auckland until 1918. He played in a trial match on 7 September to help pick the Auckland side. He was then picked for the Auckland team and was part of the 45–9 win over Canterbury played at the Auckland Domain in front of 10,000 spectators.

In 1919 Williams had a very busy season. He played in a New Zealand trial match on 14 May and was part of the A Team which lost 14–15. He was subsequently selected for the New Zealand team to tour Australia. On 24 May he made his New Zealand debut in a match against Auckland prior to the teams departure for Australia. New Zealand won the match 25–19.

Williams was to play in 10 of the 11 tour matches which along with Stan Walters was the most of any of the touring 22. He played in 4 losses to New South Wales (18–23, 9–20, 31–39, and 19–22), 2 losses to Queensland (13–26, 13–16) and wins over Tamworth (21–13), Northern Division (11–8), Rockhampton (23–0), and Toowoomba (42–14). He scored twice in the thrashing of Toowoomba which was the final match of the tour. He played in the second row in all the matches aside from the wins over Tamworth and Northern Division where he played at hooker.

A month later the Australian side was to tour New Zealand playing 9 matches including 4 tests. Williams was to become very familiar with the tourists after he played in all 4 tests and a match for Auckland against them.

Williams test debut came in the 21–44 defeat at the Basin Reserve in Wellington in front of 8,000 spectators. A week later Williams was part of the victorious New Zealand team in the second test with New Zealand winning 26–10 at Sydenham Park, Christchurch in front of 7,200 fans. Williams scored the first try early in the match after taking a pass from Karl Ifwersen and scoring near the corner. The third test was played in Auckland and Williams played in front of 20,000 spectators at the Auckland Domain. New Zealand went down 23–34. Williams was to play his final test match for New Zealand in the 4th test once again at the Auckland Domain. New Zealand was completely outplayed by the Australians who won by 32 points to 2 in front of 15,000. Following the match Williams was selected to play for Auckland against Australia. For this match Williams moved into the front row but again had a hard time of it with Auckland defeated 8–32 in front of a crowd of 15,000 at the Auckland Domain.

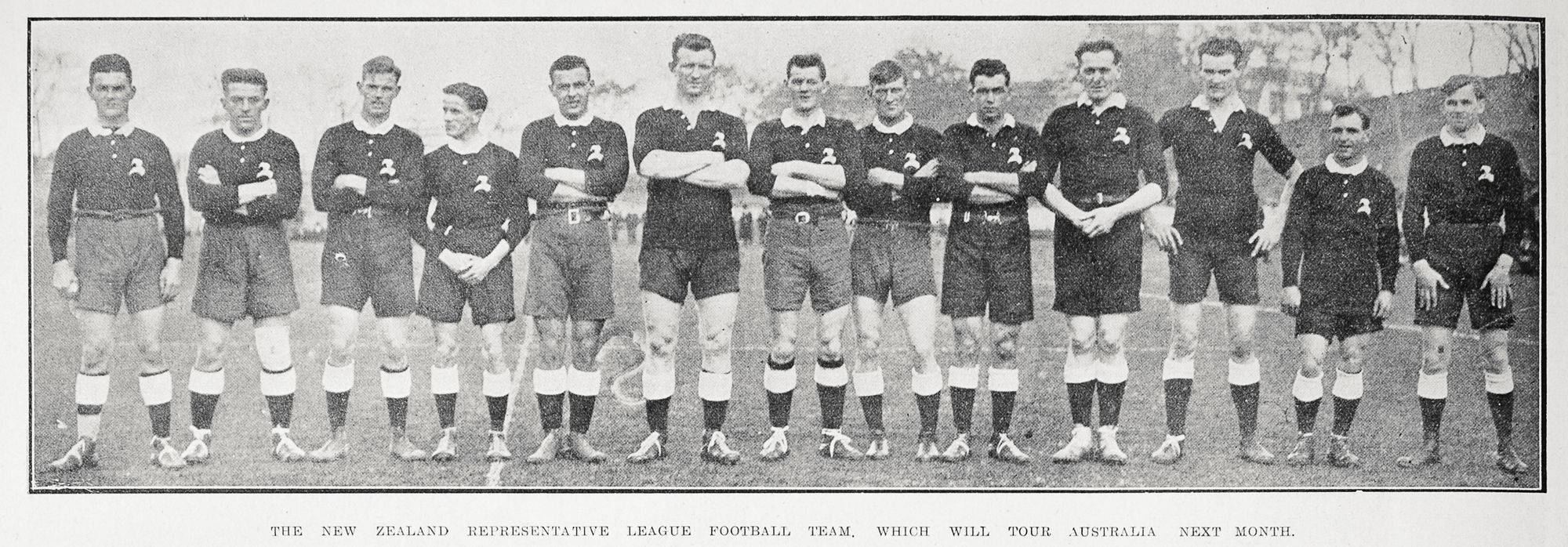
Williams 7th from the left in the 'New Zealand' team to play Auckland on 21 May 1921

In 1920 Williams did not play rugby league but returned to the field in 1921, again wearing the Newton jersey. He was selected to play for New Zealand again on their tour of Australia and he played for them against the Auckland team at the Auckland Domain prior to leaving for Australia. New Zealand won 22–16 with Williams scoring a try just before halftime to take the lead out to 13–8.

Williams played in the first 4 tour matches and the final match. New Zealand was thrashed 56 points to 9 by New South Wales with Williams playing in the second row. He was to play all of his matches in this position. He had a happier time of it in the second match against Queensland 25–12 in front of 35,000 spectators. Despite the opponents being from the north the match was played at Sydney Cricket Ground. Williams crossed for a try in the second half. Williams travelled north to Brisbane where New Zealand were defeated by Queensland 16–21 on 11 June at the Brisbane Exhibition Ground. Queensland again defeated New Zealand 8–3 a week later with Williams once again playing in the second row. He wasn’t to play again until the final tour match against Newcastle which New Zealand won 27–14 the Newcastle Showgrounds in very wet conditions. This was to be the last time Williams would pull on the New Zealand jersey.

After the tour Williams returned to Auckland where he was to play 3 matches in an Auckland jumper. He played in a 31–8 win over Wellington in what was the first ever match for Auckland on Carlaw Park. He then played in an 18–3 defeat of Hawke’s Bay, and a 58–25 thrashing of King Country.

The following year he appears to have transferred back to rugby union but did not play a game before then asking the Auckland Rugby league if he could be regraded from 1st grade to 2nd grade and this was granted. Later in the season he transferred back to the Newton Rangers and scored tries in 3 consecutive matches. He was named in the reserves several times in the 1923 season but did not take the field.

== Death ==
Bill Williams died on 21 November 1927 aged just 28 when the 12 ft mullet yacht he was sailing capsized on its way from Milford on Auckland’s North Shore to Islington Bay on Rangitoto Island. Williams who was said to be a good sailor had persuaded Stanley John Easdown to go with him to Islington Bay to go fishing and shooting. They later saw James Bowman at Milford and he asked them if he could also go. The lone survivor (Easdown) went through harrowing conditions both in the water and once ashore on Rangitoto Island in an attempt to find help. A search failed to find either William's body or that of James Bowman.

Williams married Ivy Hazeldine Gildin Thomas (b.1896-1988) in 1922 they were living in Takapuna at the time with their young children.
