= 1919 New Zealand rugby league season =

Seasons
- ← 1918 1920 →

The 1919 New Zealand rugby league season was the 12th season of rugby league that had been played in New Zealand.

== International competitions ==
New Zealand toured Australia, losing four matches to New South Wales and twice to Queensland. New Zealand's final two tour games were wins in Rockhampton and Toowoomba. They were captained by Karl Ifwersen.

New Zealand then hosted Australia, in the Kangaroos first tour to New Zealand. New Zealand lost the first Test in Wellington 44-21 before bouncing back 26–10 in the second. However they lost the final two to lose the series 1–3. The squad for the four Test matches was; Craddock Dufty, George Iles, Karl Ifwersen (c), George Bradley, Alec Morris, John Lang, George Neal, Bill Scott, Bill King, Bert Avery, Bill Williams, Sam Lowrie, Stan Walters, Jim Sanders, Mike Pollock, Keith Helander, Bill Davidson, Dougie McGregor, Bill Walsh, Tom Haddon, Ivan Stewart, Nelson Bass and Wally Somers.

Auckland lost to Australia 32–8 at the Auckland Domain in front of an estimated 20,000 spectators. Australia also defeated South Auckland 58–5, Hawke's Bay twice, 67-4 and 73-7 and scored 93 points against Wellington, defeating them 93–5. The Auckland side included; Bill Davidson, Dougie McGregor, Thomas McClymont, Karl Ifwersen, George Davidson, Ivan Stewart, Billy Ghent, Stan Walters, Sam Lowrie, Bill Williams, Bert Avery, Bob Mitchell and Nelson Bass. Reserves; George Iles, Frank Delgrosso, Jim Clark and Ernie Herring.

Henry Thacker was elected the patron of the New Zealand Rugby League during the season.

== National competitions ==
=== Northern Union Cup ===
Auckland again held the Northern Union Cup at the end of the season. A Cup defence against the Hawke's Bay was played at Eden Park. This was the first rugby league match played at the ground since 1912 and the last until the 1988 World Cup final. Auckland, who won 38–13, included Frank Delgrosso, George Davidson, Dougie McGregor, George Iles, Craddock Dufty, Bert Laing, George Neal, Keith Helander, Sam Lowrie, V Thomas, Tom Haddon, L Newdick and Bert Avery.

=== Inter-district competition ===
Canterbury defeated the West Coast, 5–3.

== Club competitions ==
=== Auckland ===
Ponsonby won the Auckland Rugby League's competition. Newton won the Roope Rooster.

The Marist Brothers Old Boys club was founded in 1919, playing matches at the Auckland Domain. Conrad McDevitt, who helped found the club, had earlier been involved with the formation of the Railway XIII side in 1917. Marist's first match was a 3–28 loss to Newton.

Grafton included Karl Ifwersen.

Ponsonby included Jim O'Brien, Jim Clark, Sam Lowrie, Walter Milne, captain Thomas McClymont, Bill Walsh and Frank Delgrosso.

The City Rovers included Bill Davidson, Ivan Stewart, and Bert Laing.

The Ellerslie United Rugby League Club was reestablished on 26 July 1919 after going into recess with the outbreak of World War I.

=== Wellington ===
Petone won the Wellington Rugby League's Appleton Shield.

=== Canterbury ===
Sydenham won the Canterbury Rugby League's competition, for which they were awarded the Thacker Shield.

Templeton and Kaiapoi joined the League while Addington regained senior status.

=== Other Competitions ===
The West Coast Rugby League was reestablished by J.D.Wingham after being in recess since 1915. Blackball, Kohinoor and Runanga competed in the competition.
