= 1922 Auckland Rugby League season =

History and stats of the 1922 Auckland League

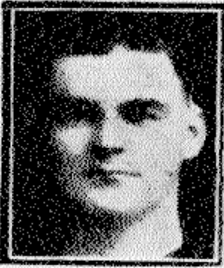
Bill Davidson

The 1922 Auckland Rugby League was the 14th in its history. There were 68 teams playing across the various grades. City Rovers won the first grade championship for the 5th time, with Ponsonby winning the Roope Rooster for the 2nd time. City Rovers also defended the Challenge Shield, warding off efforts from Petone, Tongariro, and Huntly to lift it from them. The twenty two year old Bill Davidson set a record for points scored in an Auckland club rugby league season with 116 for City Rovers. He and his brothers Ben and their Olympic sprinting brother George between them scored 186 of City Rover's 339 points which was also a competition record for a team in a single season. City scored a further 19 points in the Roope Rooster competition and 85 points in their 3 Challenge Shield matches for 443 points in all official games.

It was an incredibly busy year for the Auckland representative team. They played more matches than some club teams had played in earlier seasons with ten matches in total. There was also an Auckland Provincial team match against New South Wales, and one Auckland B fixture with the team making the trip down to Cambridge to play the local side. Bill Davidson also led the representative team in scoring with 37 points.

Preceded by 1921	14th Auckland Rugby League season 1922	Succeeded by 1923

== Auckland rugby league news ==
=== Club teams by grade participation ===
Team	1st Grd	2nd Grd	3rd Grd	4th Grd	5th Grd	6th Grd A	6th Grd B	Total
City Rovers	1	1	2	1	0	1	1	7
Richmond Rovers	1	1	1	1	1	1	1	7
Devonport United	1	1	1	1	1	0	0	5
Newton Rangers	1	1	1	1	1	0	0	5
Ponsonby United	1	1	1	0	1	1	0	5
Maritime	1	1	0	1	0	1	1	5
Manukau Rovers	0	1	0	0	1	1	1	4
Northcote & Birkenhead Ramblers	0	1	0	0	1	1	1	4
Marist Old Boys	1	0	0	0	1	1	0	3
Kingsland Rovers	0	0	1	1	0	1	0	3
Ellerslie United	0	0	1	1	0	1	0	3
Otahuhu Rovers	0	1	0	1	0	1	0	3
Parnell	0	0	1	1	0	0	1	3
Fire Brigade	1	0	0	0	0	0	0	1
Ihumātao	0	1	0	0	0	0	0	1
Māngere Rangers	0	1	0	0	0	0	0	1
Point Chevalier	0	0	1	0	0	0	0	1
Coromandel Old Boys	0	0	1	0	0	0	0	1
Takapuna	0	0	0	0	1	0	0	1
Total	8	11	11	9	8	10	6	63

=== Junior Management Committee ===
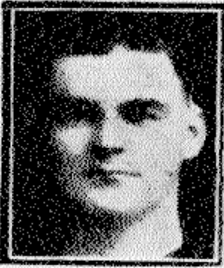
Bill Davidson

The junior management committee elected for the season was Lewis Binns, J.S. White, K. Lippiatt, G.J. Flynn, W. Baskett, William Mincham, O.O. Riley, D.C. Adamson, W.E. Frost, Bill Davidson (Hon. Sec), A. Freeman (Chairman), G.H. Seagar, A.H. Te Mete, T.B. Carpenter, W. Dowle, G.F. Burgess, J. Curtis, F. Cleal, W. Boag, F. Kennedy.

=== Carlaw Park ===
At a pre-season meeting of the management committee it was discussed that Carlaw Park needed more 'modern equipment', and it was decided that "the establishment of more modern methods of dealing with the turf and the purchase of more efficient machinery shall be an early charge on the new season's funds". Sufficient money was made from gates at club and rep fixtures at Carlaw Park and the Auckland Domain to begin improvements on the ground at the conclusion of the season.

=== New clubs and name changes ===
==== Maritime to Athletic ====
The Maritime club changed their name to 'Athletic'. Their club colours were also changed from red, white and blue to royal blue with a gold band. In 1926 they were to change their name again to Grafton Athletic. This was not to be confused with Grafton Athletic who had existed as a team from 1914 to 1920 under the leadership of Karl Ifwersen and were presently playing under the name of 'Fire Brigade'.

==== Richmond promoted to 1st grade ====
Richmond Rovers applied for entry into the Senior A Grade competition and this was approved. This made the competition an even 8 teams meaning 4 matches per round and no byes. Unlike most previous seasons there were no byes, no defaults, and no postponed matches meaning 56 matches were played in total, easily the most in the competitions history. Richmond would go on to finish 7th with 3 wins and 11 losses.

==== Ihumātao club enter ====
On April 4 the ARL management committee reported that they had accepted the application of a new club called the "Central Mangere Club", and they would enter a team in the second grade. The team was however exclusively named "Ihumata" for their existence and were ostensibly a Māori football side. It was a misspelling of their area's Māori name and was corrected at a later date to Ihumātao. They were based in the Ihumātao area of Māngere and played most of their home games at the Mangere ground further towards the east. They only survived for two seasons with it likely that many of their players began playing for the preexisting Māngere United League Football Club such as Paul and Wilson junior.

==== Coromandel Old Boys join ====
On February 15 the Auckland Rugby League held their weekly management committee meeting and said that "affiliation was granted to a new third grade club to be called Coromandel Old Boys, with the colours red, white, and blue". a Thames Old Boys team had existed from 1915 to 1920 but this team appears to have had no serious links to the Coromandel Old Boys side. The Coromandel team fielded a third grade side only from 1922 to 1925 before withdrawing from the competition.

=== George Davidson's return ===
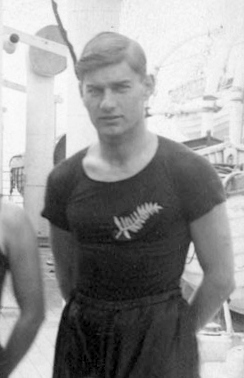
George Davidson

George Davidson played for Maritime (now named Athletic) in the 1919 season but had missed most of the 1920 and 1921 seasons as he was training for and competing at the Antwerp Olympics where he came 5th in the 200m final. He stated that over those two seasons he had only played for Maritime on two or three occasions as he was seeking a transfer to the City Rovers where his two brothers Bill and Ben played. Athletic were denying his request and Davidson appealed to the league who then asked the Athletics club to reconsider his request "favourably". He would eventually have his transfer to City approved.

=== Point Chevalier ===
Point Chevalier secured the use of Richard and Elizabeth Walker's paddock at the bottom of Humariri Street as their home ground. It has since become Walker Park where they are to this day located. In the same season they bought jerseys from George Court & Co. Ltd. In 1925 a shed was built at Walker Park with volunteer labour.

== Monteith Shield (1st grade championship) ==
=== Monteith Shield standings ===
Team	Pld	W	D	L	F	A	Pts
City Rovers	14	11	0	3	339	157	22
Ponsonby United	14	10	0	4	205	169	20
Marist Old Boys	14	9	1	4	258	192	19
Devonport United	14	7	1	6	223	194	15
Newton Rangers	14	6	1	7	197	219	13
Athletic	14	6	0	8	242	208	12
Richmond Rovers	14	3	0	11	141	295	6
Fire Brigade	14	2	1	11	143	313	5

=== Monteith Shield fixtures ===
==== Round 1 ====
Peter Irwin James Francis Hing, better known as James Hing, or later Sonny Hing scored a try for Ponsonby. He had previously played for Marist and would later coach the Point Chevalier premier side in the 1930s. He was the son of Charles A'Hing and Margaret Mary Irwin and was one of the first ever rugby league players in New Zealand with Chinese ancestry along with Arthur Singe.

22 April	Ponsonby	15–10	Newton	Carlaw Park 1
3:00	Try: James Hing, William Southernwood, George Mormon; Con: Dougie McGregor, William Hanlon; Pen: Frank Delgrosso		Try: Clarrie Polson 2 Con: Clarrie Polson; Pen: Clarrie Polson	Attendance: 4,000; Referee: A Ball

22 April	Marist	19–6	Fire Brigade	Carlaw Park 2
3:00	Try: Bill Stormont 2, John Lang, Arthur Singe, Percy Gallagher; Con: Billy Ghent, Arthur Singe		Try: John Wareing, Unknown x 1	Attendance: 4000; Referee: William Mincham

22 April	Devonport	17–31	City	Devonport Domain
3:00	Try: Johnston, Harry Douglas, Neville St George 2, Alf Scott; Pen: Neville St George		Try: Bert Laing, Bill Davidson 2, Jack Keenan, Alf Townsend, George Paki, Unknown x 1 Con: Bert Laing, Bill Davidson 4	Referee: Archie Ferguson

22 April	Richmond	2–14	Athletic	Grey Lynn Park
3:00	Pen: Henderson		Try: Eric Grey 2, Hall, George Yardley; Con: George Yardley	Attendance: 200; Referee: T Neill

==== Round 2 ====
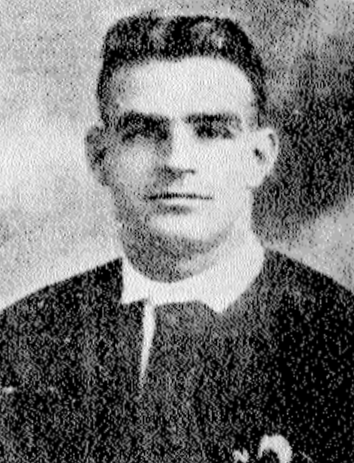
Lou Brown

Lou Brown debuted for Newton aged just 17 having already played 2 seasons of senior rugby in the Waikato. He would go on to have a remarkable career being a prolific try scorer for every team he played for which included Newton (12), Wigan (106), City (72), Halifax (33), York (77), Bordeaux, Auckland (18), North Island (4), Auckland Māori (4), Other Nationalities (5), and New Zealand (22). In the match between Athletic and Ponsonby Eric Grey had a highly unusual collection of points after he scored a try, and kicked a conversion, a penalty, a goal from a mark, and a drop goal. Bert Laing transferred to Devonport during the week and had the unusual distinction of scoring against a team and then for a team in the space of a week. In the match between Devonport and Newton Alex Godick, J Price, and Calderwood had to leave the field through injury, with Godick being concussed.

29 April	Athletic	23–5	Ponsonby	Carlaw Park 1
3:00	Try: Eric Grey, Ivan Littlewood, George Yardley 2, Bert Avery; Con: Eric Grey; Pen: Eric Grey & 1 mark Drop: Eric Grey		Try: Joe Meadows; Pen: Dougie McGregor	Attendance: 5000; Referee: Billy Murray

29 April	City	48–10	Fire Brigade	Carlaw Park 2
3:00	Try: Ben Davidson 2, Bill Davidson, Harry Francis, F Wilson 2, Ray Harley, Jack Keenan 2, Maurice Wetherill 2, Alf Townsend; Con: Bill Davidson 2, Harry Francis, Maurice Wetherill 2 Pen: Unknown x 1		Try: Charles Woolley, J O'Brien; Con: G Cargill; Pen: John Wareing	Referee: T Hill

29 April	Devonport	17–17	Newton	Devonport Domain
3:00	Try: Bert Laing 2, Jack Miller; Con: Charles Hand 2 Pen: Charles Hand 2		Try: Walter Voysey, Lou Brown 2, J Sorenson, Leo Brockliss; Con: Clarrie Polson	Attendance: 700; Referee: William Mincham

29 April	Richmond	11–25	Marist	Grey Lynn Park
3:00	Try: W Little 3 Pen: Butler		Try: Stevens, Lawson, Percy Gallagher 2, Arthur Singe, Laurie Cadman 2 Con: Stevens, Lawson	Referee: Frank Thompson

==== Round 3 ====
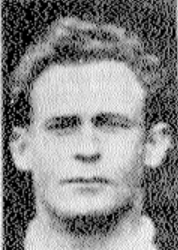
Stan Webb

Stan Webb debuted for North Shore joining his older brother Clarence in the side. Stan would go on to represent Auckland in the same season and New Zealand in 1925. He predominantly played in the halfback position but also played at centre and fullback at times.

6 May	Newton	20–16 (5-8)	Athletic	Carlaw Park 1
3:00	Try: J Sorenson 2, Wally Somers, Herbert Biggs; Con: Clarrie Polson 3 Pen: Clarrie Polson		Try: Ivan Littlewood 2, Eric Grey, Craddock Dufty; Con: Eric Grey, Craddock Dufty	Attendance: 5,000; Referee: Archie Ferguson

6 May	Marist	14–6	Ponsonby	Carlaw Park 2
3:00	Try: Nelson Bass, Percy Gallagher, George Duane, John Lang; Con: Arthur Singe		Try: Sonny Hing, William Hanlon	Attendance: 5,000; Referee: Len Farrant

6 May	Richmond	5–22	City	Grey Lynn Park
3:00	Try: W Little; Pen: Unknown x 1		Try: Jack Keenan 3, George Paki; Con: Bill Davidson 2 Pen: Bill Davidson 2, Maurice Wetherill

6 May	Devonport	18–7	Fire Brigade	Devonport Domain
3:00	Try: Charles Hand, Cyril Wheeler, Clarence Webb, Calderwood; Con: Charles Hand, Bert Laing; Pen: Charles Hand		Try: Ripley; Con: John Wareing; Pen: John Wareing	Referee: A Ball

==== Round 4 ====
The Carlaw Park games secured £213 2/6 through gate attendances. The main match between Marist and Athletics was "fast and interesting throughout, and was one of the best expositions of the code that has been seen here for some time" according to the Auckland Star scribe. In the match between Ponsonby and City, Horace Neal, and Mitchell were ordered off after a scuffle in the corner during the second half. The referee (Walter Ripley) stated at the hearing that he had caught them just before blows were struck and both players were let off with a caution. The Newton v Fire Brigade match at Grey Lynn Park only received very brief match reports with no detailed scoring provided.

13 May	Marist	21–20	Athletic	Carlaw Park 1
3:00	Try: Frank Turner, Percy Gallagher 2, George Duane, Laurie Cadman; Con: John Lang, A Nelson; Pen: Billy Ghent		Try: Ivan Littlewood, Jack McGregor, Eric Grey; Con: Mike Flynn 2 Pen: Mike Flynn, Craddock Dufty	Attendance: 5500; Referee: Bert Gallagher

13 May	Ponsonby	15–10	City	Carlaw Park 2
3:00	Try: James (Sonny) Hing, Frank Delgrosso, R Cook; Con: Thomas McClymont 3		Try: Ben Davidson, F Wilson; Con: Bill Davidson; Pen: Bill Davidson	Referee: Walter Ripley

13 May	Devonport	24–10	Richmond	Devonport Domain
3:00	Try: Alf Scott, Jack Miller, Charles Hand, Clarke, Cyril Wheeler, Clarence Webb; Con: Charles Hand, Tommy Taylor; Pen: Charles Hand		Try: F C Blakey, McFarlane; Con: Eric (Mick) Carroll, McFarlane	Referee: T Hill

13 May	Newton	16–8	Fire Brigade	Grey Lynn Park
3:00	Try: Unknown x 4 Con: Unknown x 2		Try: Ronald Lovatt, Unknown x 1 Con: Unknown x 1	Referee: Frank Thompson

==== Round 5 ====
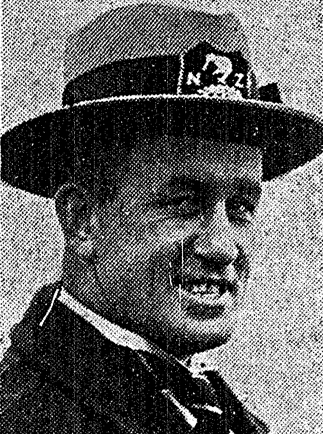
Athletic captain, Bert Avery

George Davidson made his debut for the City club. He had requested to be released from the Maritime/Athletic club where he had previously been a member prior to going to the Antwerp Olympics where he competed in the 100 and 200m races. He wished to join bis brothers Ben and Bill in the City side but was initially blocked by his old club before securing the release. He scored a try for City in their 20-5 win over his old side, with brother Ben being credited with a penalty try after being held back by his jersey when he was going to score, and Bill kicked 4 conversions. At halftime Athletic sent their fullback, Mike Flynn (a boxer from Australia), to second five eighth and shifted Dougie McGregor to fullback. They also brought New Zealand international Bert Avery out of the back row to act as an extra five eighth to good effect but they still went down. A Halliday scored Athletic's only try. He was also on debut for them, having previously playing for Ponsonby in 1920. The conditions at Carlaw Park were poor with a wet, muddy field with a smaller crowd than previous weeks. There was still 72 pounds in gate takings collected however. Harry Francis the City forward broke his shoulder and such was the seriousness of the injury that two months later on July 27 a benefit concert was held for him in the Town Hall concert chamber. Francis had been unable to work in his occupation due to the injury.

27 May	City	20–5	Athletic	Carlaw Park 1
3:00	Try: George Davidson, Ben Davidson, Jack Keenan, Alf Townsend; Con: Bill Davidson 4		Try: A Halliday; Con: Eric Grey	Attendance: 2,500; Referee: Bert Gallagher

27 May	Marist	15–5	Newton	Carlaw Park 2
3:00	Try: Bill Stormont, Percy Gallagher, Billy Ghent; Con: Arthur Singe; Pen: Bill Stormont, Arthur Singe		Try: W Miller; Pen: Charles James	Attendance: 2,500; Referee: Frank Thompson

27 May	Richmond	5–15	Fire Brigade	Grey Lynn Park
3:00	Try: J McLean; Con: Eric (Mick) Carroll		Try: Brady, John Wareing, Cargill; Con: Jack Woolley	Referee: Les Bull

27 May	Devonport	8–20	Ponsonby	Devonport Domain
3:00	Try: Stan Webb, Cyril Wheeler; Pen: Charles Hand		Try: William Hanlon, Frank Delgrosso, Sonny Hing, R Cook; Con: Frank Delgrosso 2, Thomas McClymont 2	Attendance: 500; Referee: Billy Murray

==== Round 6 ====
In "ideal" conditions a "record attendance" came to Carlaw Park with £255 13/6 taken at the gates. Bill Davidson scored a try and kicked 2 conversions and 2 penalties for a personal haul of 11 points in City's 17-13 win over Marist.

10 June	City	17–13	Marist	Carlaw Park 1
3:00	Try: Bill Davidson, Ben Davidson, Maurice Wetherill; Con: Bill Davidson 2 Pen: Bill Davidson 2		Try: Billy Ghent, Percy Gallagher, John Lang; Pen: Arthur Singe, D Murray	Referee: Archie Ferguson

10 June	Ponsonby	12–4	Fire Brigade	Carlaw Park 2
3:00	Try: Thomas McClymont, William Hanlon; Con: Dougie McGregor, Frank Delgrosso; Pen: Thomas McClymont		Pen: John Wareing, Henderson	Referee: William Mincham

10 June	Newton	32–8	Richmond	Victoria Park 2
3:00	Try: Clarrie Polson, Lou Brown 2, Walter Voysey, Wally Somers 2, Frederick Gregory, Bill Cloke; Con: Charles James, W Miller, Unknown x 2		Try: Parkes, Butler; Con: Eric (Mick) Carroll	Referee: T Hill

10 June	Devonport	20–12	Athletic	Devonport Domain
3:00	Try: J Price, Clarke, Stan Webb, Alf Scott; Con: Charles Hand, Bert Laing; Pen: Charles Hand, + 1 goal from a mark		Try: Halliday, Ivan Littlewood; Con: Eric Grey; Pen: Bert Avery; Drop: Eric Grey	Referee: Len Farrant

==== Round 7 ====
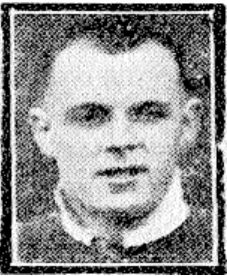
Wally Somers

The match between Devonport and Marist was the 50th senior rugby league game played at Devonport Domain. The first match played there was in 1910. A large crowd attended the Carlaw Park games with 183 pounds being taken at the gate. The Auckland Star match description of the City v Newton game said that Wally Somers scored for Newton however the slightly more detailed New Zealand Herald match report credited the try to Leo Barraclough after Somers passed him the ball so Barraclough has been credited with the try.

17 June	City	19–13	Newton	Carlaw Park 1
3:00	Try: George Davidson 2 (incl obstruction try), Ben Davidson, Penalty Try; Con: Bill Davidson 3 Pen: Maurice Wetherill 1 mark Drop: Ben Davidson		Try: Leo Barraclough, Lou Brown, Arthur James; Con: Clarrie Polson; Pen: Clarrie Polson	Referee: Les Bull

17 June	Fire Brigade	32–25	Athletic	Carlaw Park 2
3:00	Try: Henderson 2, Brady 2, Cargill, Charles Woolley, John Woolley 2 Con: John Wareing, Henderson 2 Pen: John Wareing		Try: Nicholson, Brake, Jim Brien, Bert Avery, Herb Lunn; Con: Eric Grey 3 Drop: Eric Grey, McGregor	Referee: T Hill

17 June	Devonport	14–12	Marist	Devonport Domain
3:00	Try: Clarence Webb, Alf Scott, Cyril Wheeler, Selwyn Chatfield; Pen: Bert Laing		Try: Percy Gallagher, Bill Stormont, George Duane, Billy Ghent	Referee: Billy Murray

17 June	Richmond	13–21	Ponsonby	Grey Lynn Park
3:00	Try: W Little, McKenzie, Butler; Con: Eric (Mick) Carroll, Butler		Try: William Southernwood, Thomas McClymont, Bill Walsh, Frank Delgrosso, Dougie McGregor; Con: Thomas McClymont 3	Referee: Bert Gallagher

==== Round 8 ====
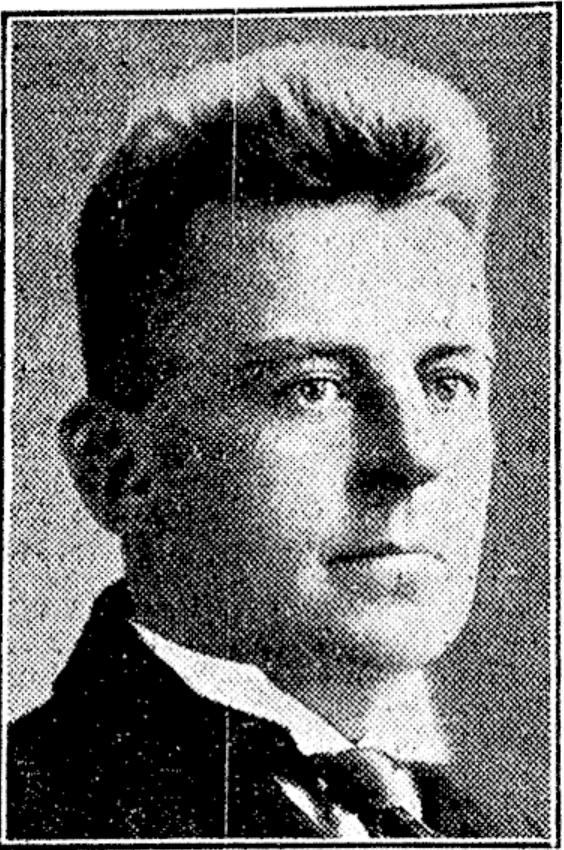
Charles Woolley, the Fire Brigade captain who was badly concussed.

The club games resumed after Auckland had played the Australian University side 3 times. The crowd at Carlaw Park was relatively small with just £61 15/ taken at the gate with slippery conditions prevailing. In the 3pm game City had a 9-3 win with no goals kicked in the match. Near full time F. Wilson was knocked unconscious and had to be carried from the field. The game on the number 2 field between Ponsonby and Newton was a "mud scramble". Richmond recorded their first win coming back from 7-0 down at half time against Athletic at Victoria Park while Marist also mounted a second half comeback to draw 21-21. They had trailed 15-2 at the break. Marist had struggled to get a full team on the field and it was rumoured that they might have to default however they eventually mustered a side. Early in the match one of their recent recruits from rugby was ordered off the field for rough play which injured McClure. In the second half the Fire Brigade captain, Charles Woolley collided heavily with his brother John (Jack) with the sound of the contact heard by spectators. He was able to carry on but at the conclusion of the game had to be carried from the field suffering from concussion.

1 July	City	9–3	Devonport	Carlaw Park 1
3:00	Try: George Davidson, F Wilson, Harry Hawkes		Try: Stan Webb	Referee: Len Farrant

1 July	Ponsonby	16–5	Newton	Carlaw Park 2
3:00	Try: William Hanlon, McGregor, A Black, Wilfred McNeil; Con: Dougie McGregor; Pen: Frank Delgrosso		Try: D Annan; Con: Clarrie Polson	Referee: A Ball

1 July	Marist	21–21	Fire Brigade	Victoria Park 1
3:00	Try: Billy Ghent, Roly Tait, John Lang, A Martin, Percy Gallagher; Con: D Murray 2 Pen: Billy Ghent		Try: Lovett, John Woolley, John Wareing, R Coates, Ernie Herring; Con: John Wareing, J O'Brien; Pen: R Lovett	Referee: L Hemming

1 July	Richmond	8-7	Athletic	Victoria Park 2
3:00	Try: McKenzie, W Little; Pen: Butler		Try: W Miller; Pen: Eric Grey 2	Referee: A Vause

==== Round 9 ====
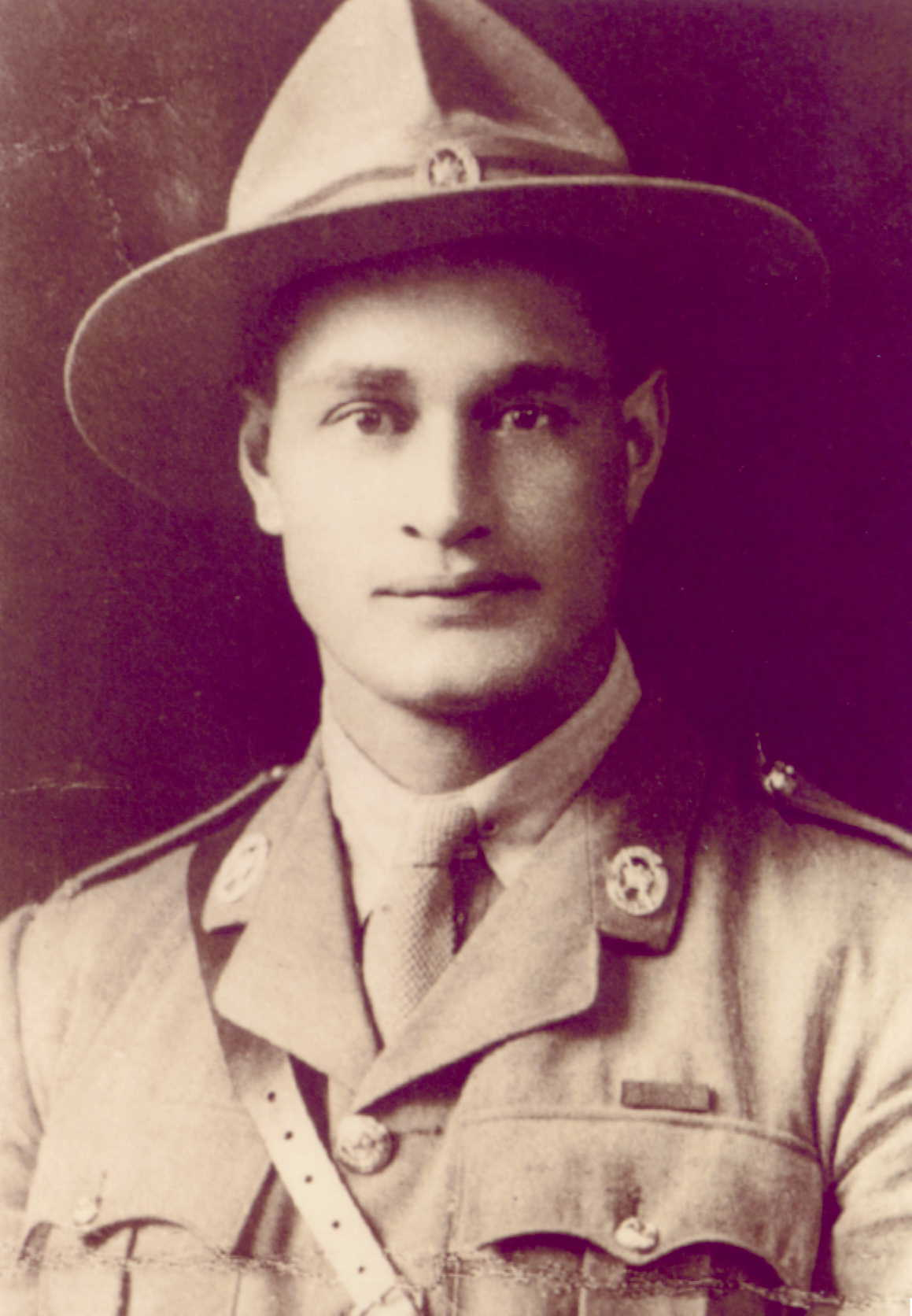
George Gardiner debuted for the Fire Brigade side. He would later play for New Zealand and represent the Marist and Ponsonby clubs.

The New Zealand Māori team had returned from their Australian tour and the Auckland players rejoined their club sides including George Paki (City), Sam Lowrie (Ponsonby), and Craddock Dufty (Athletic). There were also seven Māori players registered with the Fire Brigade club but ultimately only George Gardiner, Moses Yates, Bill Te Whata, and Barney Pitman took the field. They were well beaten by the strong City side 32-2. Ponsonby and Athletic both struggled to get full teams on the field and had to use lower grade players to make up their numbers. Athletic were missing Eric Grey and captain Bert Avery. For Ponsonby, their captain Thomas McClymont scored a try and converted 5 of their tries.

8 July	City	32–2	Fire Brigade	Auckland Domain 2
3:00	Try: George Davidson, Ben Davidson 2, Bill Davidson, George Reid, Maurice Wetherill; Con: Bill Davidson 4, Maurice Wetherill; Pen: Bill Davidson 2		Pen: Henderson	Referee: Les Bull

8 July	Marist	27–15	Richmond	Auckland Domain 1
3:00	Try: Percy Gallagher, John Lang 2, Arthur Singe, Stevens 2, Norm Loveridge; Con: Percy Gallagher, John Lang; Pen: John Lang		Try: S McLean, J McLean 2 Con: Eric (Mick) Carroll 2 Pen: Eric (Mick) Carroll	Referee: T Hill

8 July	Newton	16–11	Devonport	Victoria Park 1
3:00	Try: Clarrie Polson, Walter Voysey; Con: Clarrie Polson 2 Pen: Clarrie Polson, Walter Voysey 2		Try: J Price, Clarke, Charles Hand; Drop: W Harrison	Referee: A Ball

8 July	Ponsonby	30–10	Athletic	Victoria Park 3
3:00	Try: Thomas McClymont, Dougie McGregor 2, Eric McGregor, William Hanlon, Sonny Hing; Con: Thomas McClymont 5 Pen: Frank Delgrosso		Try: George Yardley, R Lonergan; Con: Craddock Dufty 2	Referee: William Mincham

==== Round 10 ====
Marist had to fill 4 vacancies from their starting side just before kickoff with Nelson Bass, Bill Stormont and Stevens all having to play in the back line. While John Lang played at half back in place of the absent Billy Ghent. Bass played in the five eighth position along with Norm Loveridge. The Newton v Athletic game saw some controversy. Bert Avery was playing in the five eighths for Athletic, away from his usual loose forward position and he appeared to score at one point. The referee did not award it and Lou Brown gathered the ball and ran the length of the field to score. Newton went on to win the game 16-15.

15 July	Ponsonby	13–9	Marist	Carlaw Park 1
3:00	Try: William Hanlon, Frank Delgrosso, R Cook; Con: Thomas McClymont 2		Try: A Nelson; Pen: Bill Stormont, John Lang; Drop: John Lang	Referee: Billy Murray

15 July	City	48–12	Richmond	Carlaw Park 2
3:00	Try: Harry Hawkes, George Paki 2, Bill Davidson 2, Vic Thomas, F Wilson 3, Ernie Mackie, Ben Davidson 2 Con: Bill Davidson, Ben Davidson, Alf Townsend, Maurice Wetherill, C "Chook" Mitchell; Pen: Harry Hawkes		Try: McKenzie, S McLean; Con: Eric (Mick) Carroll; Pen: Eric (Mick) Carroll 2	Referee: Len Farrant

15 July	Devonport	21–7	Fire Brigade	Victoria Park
3:00	Try: Harry Douglas 2, Bert Laing, Stan Webb, Clarence Webb; Con: Bert Laing 2, Tommy Taylor		Try: John Wareing; Pen: John Wareing 2	Referee: Walter Ripley

15 July	Newton	16–15	Athletic	Auckland Domain 2
3:00	Try: Lou Brown 2, Wally Somers, Leo Barraclough; Con: Clarrie Polson; Pen: Walter Voysey		Try: Redmond Lonergan, G Nicholson, George Yardley; Con: Craddock Dufty 2 Pen: Craddock Dufty	Referee: Archie Ferguson

==== Round 11 ====
The matches at Carlaw Park drew £201 1/ in gate takings with City against Ponsonby in the main match on the number 1 field. City thrashed Ponsonby 40 to 9 with George Davidson and brother Ben Davidson scoring two tries each while Maurice Wetherill crossed for four 4. The eldest Davidson brother Bill converted four of their ten tries. A thousand spectators also ventured to Victoria Park to watch Newton beat Fire Brigade 19-17.

22 July	City	40–9	Ponsonby	Carlaw Park 1
3:00	Try: George Davidson 2, Maurice Wetherill 4, Ben Davidson 2, George Paki, Alf Townsend; Con: Bill Davidson 4, Ernie Mackie		Try: Thomas McClymont; Con: Thomas McClymont; Pen: Frank Delgrosso 2	Referee: Bert Gallagher

22 July	Athletic	29–8	Marist	Carlaw Park 2
3:00	Try: Bert Avery 2, Redmond Lonergan, David Dance, Craddock Dufty, George Yardley 2 Con: Craddock Dufty 2, George Yardley, Mike Flynn		Try: A Nelson, Jock Johnson; Con: Bill Stormont	Referee: Les Bull

22 July	Devonport	37–15	Richmond	Auckland Domain 1
3:00	Try: Alex Godick, Bert Laing, Harry Douglas, Neville St George, Clarence Webb, Tommy Taylor, Stan Webb 2, Johnson; Con: Bert Laing, Neville St George, Stan Webb, Harrison		Try: E Davis, Butler, H McDonald; Con: Butler 2 Pen: Butler	Referee: L Benson

22 July	Newton	19–17	Fire Brigade	Victoria Park 2
3:00	Try: Bill Williams, Lou Brown 2, Alan Clarke, Leo Brockliss; Con: Walter Voysey, Clarrie Polson		Try: John Wareing 2, George Cargill; Con: John Wareing 2 Pen: John Wareing 2	Attendance: 1,000; Referee: T Hill

==== Round 12 ====
Richmond caused something of an upset beating Fire Brigade by 18 points to 3 in very cold conditions at the Auckland Domain. Fire Brigade were missing six players who had been injured the previous weekend including Ernie Herring, Jack Woolley, Charles Woolley, R.R Lovett, and John Wareing. In the main match at Carlaw Park Athletic beat City with recent addition Redmond Lonergan on the wing getting a hat trick of tries for the winners.

29 July	Athletic	19–12	City	Carlaw Park 1
3:00	Try: Redmond Lonergan 3, George Yardley, Bert Avery; Con: Craddock Dufty, George Yardley		Try: Vic Thomas, F Wilson; Con: Bill Davidson 2 Pen: Bill Davidson 1 mark	Referee: Les Bull

29 July	Marist	31–10	Newton	Carlaw Park 2
3:00	Try: Nelson Bass, Arthur Singe, Billy Ghent 2, Percy Gallagher 2, George Duane; Con: Norm Loveridge, Stevens; Pen: Nelson Bass + 1 mark, Billy Ghent		Try: Wally Somers, Bill Cloke; Con: Walter Voysey 2	Referee: Albert Vause

29 July	Devonport	11–5	Ponsonby	Auckland Domain 1
3:00	Try: Alf Scott, Stan Webb, J Price; Con: Tommy Taylor		Try: Frank Delgrosso; Con: Thomas McClymont	Referee: William Mincham

29 July	Richmond	18–3	Fire Brigade	Auckland Domain 3
3:00	Try: W Little, Eric (Mick) Carroll, Lovegrove, McKenzie; Con: McKenzie; Pen: Barry 2		Try: W McLure	Referee: Ladbury (Ray) Hemming

==== Round 13 ====
The gate collected 195 pounds at Carlaw Park. The Auckland Star credited a try to B Nilson while the New Zealand Herald writer said that it was George Duane that crossed in the corner.

5 August	Marist	21–12	City	Carlaw Park 1
3:00	Try: George Duane 2 (or B Nilson 1 and Duane 1), Percy Gallagher, Bill Stormont, Sid McNamara; Con: Bill Stormont 2, Norm Loveridge		Try: Ben Davidson, Harry Hawkes; Con: Bill Davidson; Pen: Bill Davidson 2	Referee: Billy Murray

5 August	Athletic	11-9	Devonport	Carlaw Park 2
3:00	Try: Bert Avery; Con: George Yardley; Pen: George Yardley 2, Craddock Dufty		Try: Bert Laing; Con: Tommy Taylor; Pen: Bert Laing 1 mark, Charles Hand	Referee: Frank Thompson

5 August	Ponsonby	23–6	Fire Brigade	Auckland Domain 1
3:00	Try: Leonard Riley, Sonny Hing 2, Mason, Unknown x 1 Con: Dougie McGregor 2, Unknown x 1 Pen: Dougie McGregor		Try: Henderson, Ernie Herring	Referee: Bert Gallagher

5 August	Richmond	13–5	Newton	Auckland Domain 2
3:00	Try: McKenzie, Puha, Eric (Mick) Carroll; Con: Butler; Pen: Butler		Try: Arthur James; Pen: Lou Brown	Referee: Walter Ripley

==== Round 14 ====
164 pounds and 5 shillings was taken at the Carlaw Park gate. By virtue of their 18-13 win over Newton City claimed the championship. Ponsonby could have tied for the lead in the competition with a City loss but the Rovers side won thanks the scoring of the Davidson brothers. George Davidson and Ben Davidson scored two tries each and Bill Davidson converted three of them. Bill Williams scored on his return to the Newton side after a stint in rugby union. Richard Rope played his first game for Newton since 1917 after returning to Auckland from Northland. He scored a try for the losers who also were unfortunate in losing Clarrie Polson to injury in the second half leaving them to play with 12. Bill Cloke who had been playing at five eighth moved to halfback to replace Polson and gave "a remarkable display".

12 August	City	18–13	Newton	Carlaw Park 1
3:00	Try: George Davidson 2, Ben Davidson 2 Con: Bill Davidson 3		Try: Charles James, Richard Rope, Bill Williams; Con: Clarrie Polson, Alan Clarke	Referee: Archie Ferguson

12 August	Marist	22–13	Devonport	Carlaw Park 2
3:00	Try: Lynch, Percy Gallagher, Arthur Singe 2 Con: Bill Stormont, Billy Ghent, Norm Loveridge; Pen: Bill Stormont + 1 mark		Try: Stan Webb 3 Con: Tommy Taylor 2	Referee: A Ball

12 August	Athletic	36–5	Fire Brigade	Auckland Domain
3:00	Try: Eric Grey 3, Charles Webb, Nicholson, Craddock Dufty, Bert Avery, Unknown x 1 Con: Eric Grey, George Yardley, L Lee, Unknown x 1 Drop: Eric Grey, John McGregor		Try: R Lovett; Pen: John Wareing	Referee: Walter Ripley

12 August	Richmond	6–15	Ponsonby	Grey Lynn Park
3:00	Try: Butler 2		Try: Ivan Littlewood, Frank Delgrosso 2 Con: Dougie McGregor, Ivan Littlewood; Pen: Dougie McGregor	Referee: William Mincham

== Roope Rooster knockout competition ==
The loss by Athletic in the final was remarkably their 5th consecutive loss in the Roope Rooster final (their previous 4 under the name or Maritime).

=== Round 1 ===
26 August	Ponsonby	16–13	Marist	Carlaw Park 1
3:00	Try: Wilfred McNeil, William Hanlon, Ivan Littlewood 2 Pen: Dougie McGregor & 1 mark		Try: Bill Stormont, Arthur Singe, C Stevens; Con: Norm Loveridge 2	Referee: William Mincham

26 August	Athletic	15–12	Fire Brigade	Carlaw Park 2
3:00	Try: Jack McGregor, Bert Avery, Nicholson; Con: Craddock Dufty; Pen: Craddock Dufty 2		Try: John Wareing, Henderson; Con: John Wareing; Pen: John Wareing 2	Referee: T Hill

26 August	Newton	18–13	Richmond	Auckland Domain
3:00	Try: Clarrie Polson, Biggs, Thomas Virtue, Bill Williams, Unknown x 1 Con: Lou Brown, Unknown x 1		Try: E Redwood, Eric (Mick) Carroll, Parkes; Con: Eric (Mick) Carroll; Pen: Butler	Referee: Len Farrant

26 August	Devonport	11–12	City	Devonport Domain
3:00	Try: Cyril Wheeler, Stan Webb, Matthew Scott; Pen: Bert Laing		Try: George Paki, George Davidson; Con: Maurice Wetherill; Pen: Bill Davidson 2 marks	Referee: Billy Murray

=== Semi finals ===
9 September	Ponsonby	41–20	Newton	Carlaw Park 1
1:45	Try: Eric McGregor, Williams, Ivan Littlewood 5, Wilfred McNeil 2, William Southernwood, Hector Cole; Con: Dougie McGregor 3, Thomas McClymont		Try: Walter Voysey, Biggs, Wally Somers, Lou Brown; Con: Wally Somers 2 Pen: Walter Voysey (pen & mark)	Referee: William Mincham

9 September	Athletic	9–7	City	Carlaw Park 1
3.30	Try: Bert Avery; Con: Eric Grey; Pen: George Yardley; Drop: Eric Grey		Try: C "Chook" Mitchell; Con: Bill Davidson; Pen: Bill Davidson	Referee: Les Bull

=== Final ===
30 September	Ponsonby	11–10	Athletic	Carlaw Park 1
3:00	Try: Thomas McClymont 2, Wilfred McNeil; Con: Thomas McClymont		Try: Nicholson, Eric Grey; Con: Eric Grey; Pen: Eric Grey	Referee: Bert Gallagher

== Top try scorers and point scorers ==
These lists include tries and points scored in the First Grade competition and the Roope Rooster competition only. Bill Davidson set a record for the number of points scored by a single player in a season. While earlier seasons were often incomplete with some points unattributed his 115 points was well ahead of the previous highest of 78 by Karl Ifwersen in the 1915 season. Percy Gallagher of Marist was the top try scorer with 15.

Top try scorers
Rk	Player	Team	Gms	Tries
1=	Ben Davidson	City	14	15
1=	Percy Gallagher	Marist	15	15
3	Ivan Littlewood	Athletic & Ponsonby	9 (6 & 3)	13 (5 & 8)
4	Stan Webb	Devonport	13	11
5=	Lou Brown	Newton	16	10
5=	George Davidson	City	12	10
7=	Eric Grey	Athletic	11	9
7=	Bert Avery	Athletic	13	9
9=	George Yardley	Athletic	9	8
9=	Maurice Wetherill	City	16	8
9=	F Wilson	City	16	8

Top point scorers
Rk	Player	Team	G	T	C	P	M	DG	Pts
1	Bill Davidson	City	16	7	34	10	3	0	115
2	Eric Grey	Athletic	11	9	10	4	1	5	67
3	Thomas McClymont	Ponsonby	13	6	19	1	0	0	58
4	John Wareing	Fire Brigade	15	7	6	11	0	0	55
5	Ben Davidson	City	14	15	1	0	0	1	49
6=	Clarrie Polson	Newton	13	5	12	4	0	0	47
6=	Percy Gallagher	Marist	15	15	1	0	0	0	47
8	Ivan Littlewood	Athletic & Ponsonby	6 & 3	13	1	0	0	0	41
9=	George Yardley	Athletic	9	8	5	3	0	0	40
9=	Maurice Wetherill	City	16	8	5	2	1	0	40

== Challenge shield matches ==
City Rovers came into the season as holders of the trophy after defeating Ponsonby United the previous season. The shield had taken the place of the Thacker Shield which had been taken from Ponsonby and returned to the Canterbury Rugby League after a dispute over who was eligible to compete for it. City went on to defend the shield 3 times during the season defeating Petone, Tongariro, and Huntly.

=== City v Petone ===
7 October	City	5–3	Petone	Carlaw Park
3:00	Try: F Wilson; Pen: Selby Crewther		Try: Kruse	Referee: Archie Ferguson

=== City v Tongariro ===
The Tongariro team was "made up of Maori players drawn from the scattered settlements of the King Country" according to the New Zealand Herald match report, though were missing some of their best players. The Auckland Star reported that many of their players were graduates of Te Aute College.

14 October	City	37–14	Tongariro	Carlaw Park 1
3:00	Try: Maurice Wetherill 3, Alf Townsend, Ernie Mackie, George Paki, F Wilson, Ben Davidson 2 Con: Ernie Mackie 3, Harry Hawkes; Pen: Selby Crewther		Try: Springall, H Pau, Taia, Hamu; Con: H Pau	Referee: Les Bull

=== City v Huntly ===
Huntly came to Auckland as the South Auckland (Waikato) champions and were expected to provide a stern test to City however after a competitive first half with the scores tied at 11-11 at the break, they fell away badly in the second half with City ending up running in 11 tries. The match was the last of the season for City and saw them score a total of 444 points in total. Ben Davidson with three more tries finished with 20 tries from 17 games.

28 October	City	43–13	Huntly	Carlaw Park 1
3:00	Try: Harry Hawkes 4, Maurice Wetherill, Ben Davidson 3, George Davidson 2, George Paki; Con: Harry Hawkes, Maurice Wetherill, George Davidson, Ernie Mackie, George Paki		Try: Stan Raynor, Sheeran, Tim Peckham; Pen: George Raynor 2

== Lower grades ==
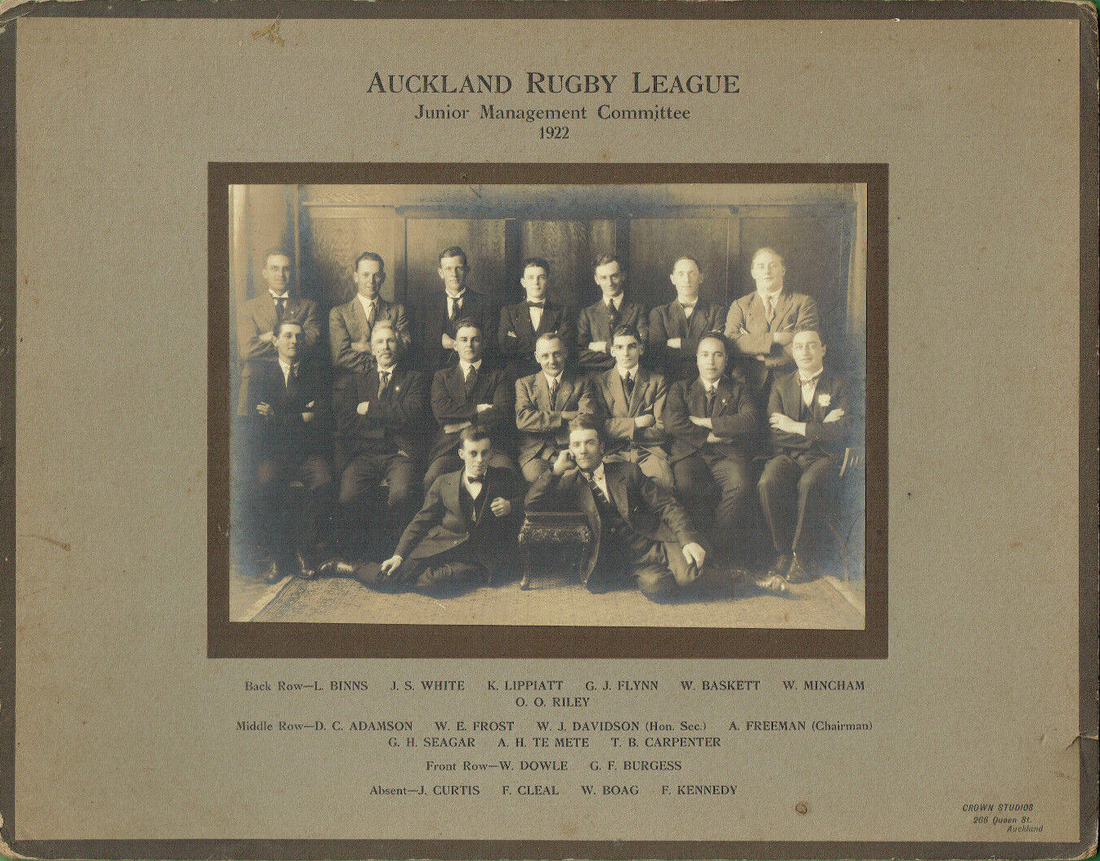

There were 7 lower grades in 1922 if you include the Sixth Grade which was split into an A and B grade and the Cadet Competition. Mr. G. Davis donated a trophy for the junior club with the most points and it was won by Richmond, with City second and Ponsonby third.

=== Second grade ===
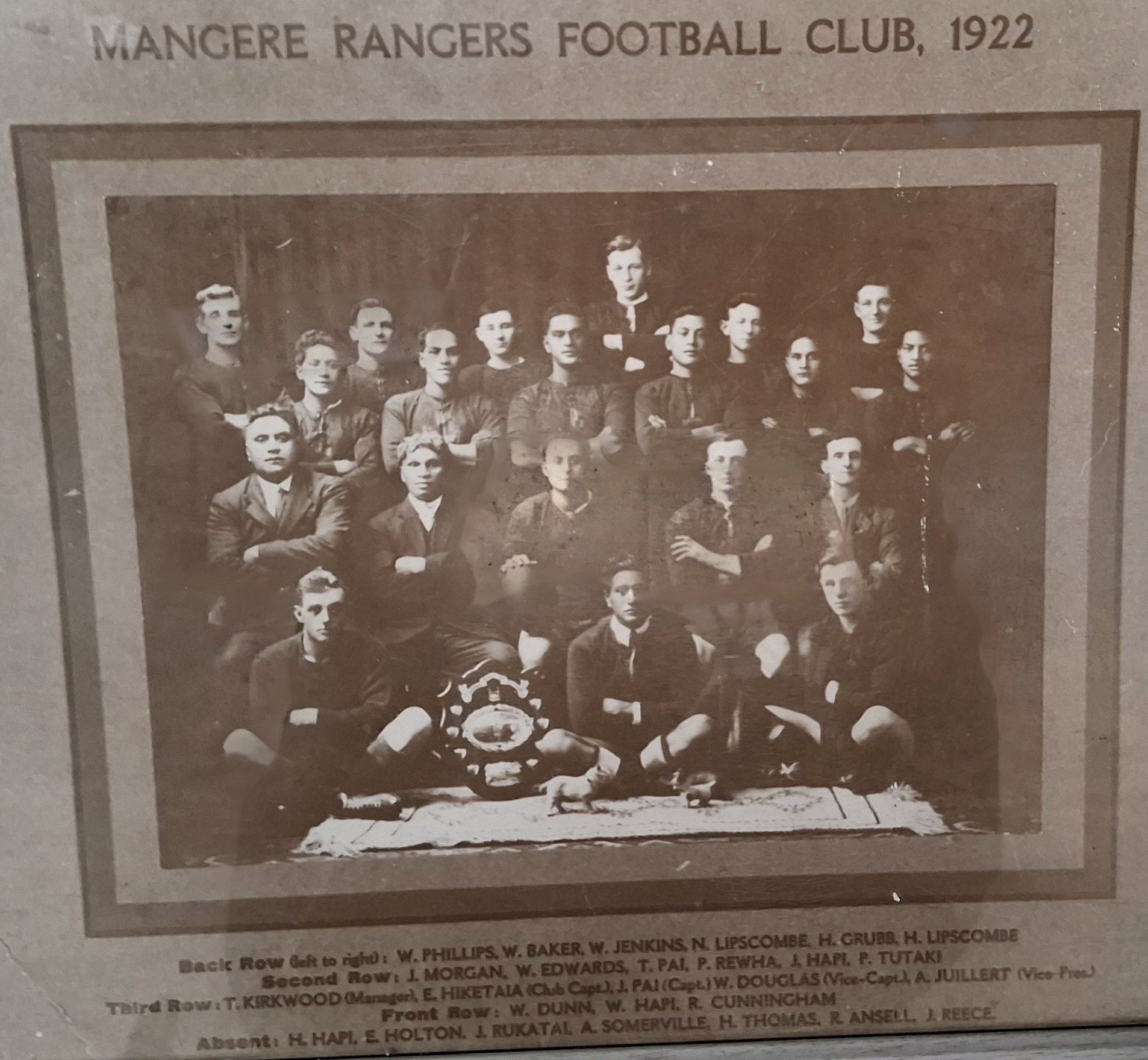
Māngere United League Football Club in 1922.

City Rovers defeated Devonport United 16–13 in the final on September 2. Marist and Ellerslie had withdrawn after 2 rounds and had no results reported so possibly didn't play in any matches and therefore have been omitted from the standings, Newton withdrew after 8, Athletic after 9, and Otahuhu after 10. A knockout competition involving the nine teams still remaining from the championship, and Newton who had reformed their team began on September 9. On October 28 Mangere defeated Newton 19-11 in the final played at Manukau (Onehunga). On September 16 a Junior rep side made up of players from this grade played against the Wednesday Representative side and lost 16-8. The match was played as a curtain-raiser to the Auckland - New South Wales at Carlaw Park.

Team	Pld	W	D	L	B	F	A	Pts
City Rovers	7	6	0	1	1	98	40	12
Devonport United	3	1	0	2	1	58	44	2
Richmond Rovers	9	6	0	3	1	89	47	12
Māngere Rangers	8	3	1	4	1	38	68	7
Ponsonby United	6	3	0	3	2	66	81	6
Ihumātao	14	3	0	3	1	78	107	6
Manukau Rovers	4	3	0	1	2	30	21	6
Newton Rangers	2	1	1	0	1	23	15	3
Otahuhu Rovers	2	1	0	2	1	14	5	2
Northcote & Birkenhead Ramblers	6	0	0	6	2	16	57	0
Athletic	2	0	0	2	0	0	26	0

=== Third grade (Myers Cup) ===
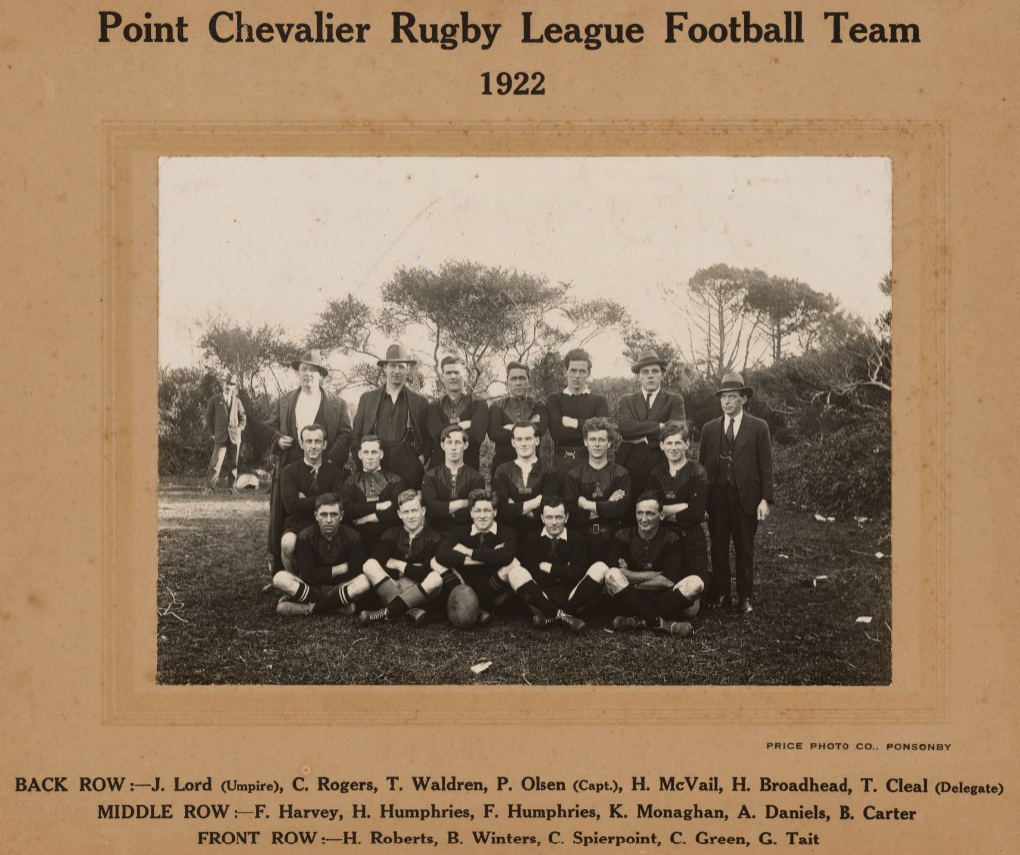
The Point Chevalier 3rd Grade side.

Ponsonby United won the championship with an undefeated record, beating Kingsland Rovers 9-3 in what was labelled the final, on September 23, although Kingsland had lost at least 3 matches prior to this. A large number of results were unreported though the majority of Ponsonby and Point Chevalier's results were. Manukau defaulted their first two matches and then withdrew so have been omitted from the standings as they did not play a game. City B withdrew after 12 rounds, Devonport and Coromandel Old Boys withdrew after 14 rounds.

Team	Pld	W	D	L	B	F	A	Pts
Ponsonby United	13	12	1	0	1	202	48	25
Kingsland Rovers	12	8	0	4	1	51	61	16
Point Chevalier	12	8	1	3	0	199	67	17
Ellerslie United	9	4	0	5	2	90	89	8
Parnell	9	4	0	5	0	23	83	8
Newton Rangers	6	2	2	2	2	55	38	6
City Rovers B	4	2	0	2	1	13	39	4
Richmond Rovers	8	1	1	6	1	39	50	3
Devonport United	8	1	1	6	2	29	85	3
City Rovers A	6	1	0	5	2	18	64	2
Coromandel Old Boys	12	1	0	4	2	7	102	2

=== Fourth grade ===
Richmond played Otahuhu on September 23 for the championship. The match was drawn 5-5 but Richmond secured the title as they were 1 competition point ahead going into the match. A large number of results were not reported, with just 3 of Otahuhu's reported thus their tally of 6 wins is based purely on the fact that they finished 1 pt behind Richmond. Richmond only had 8 results reported from their 14 scheduled matches. City withdrew after 11 rounds.

Team	Pld	W	D	L	B	F	A	Pts
Richmond Rovers	8	7	1	0	4	150	34	15
Otahuhu Rovers	3	6	1	0	2	29	8	13
Kingsland Rovers	5	4	0	1	5	60	40	8
Parnell	10	4	0	6	1	65	136	8
Athletic	4	2	0	2	1	51	16	4
Ellerslie United	7	1	0	6	2	38	99	2
Devonport United	3	1	0	2	1	14	30	2
City Rovers	3	1	0	2	1	32	10	0
Newton Rangers	3	0	0	3	3	11	77	0

=== Fifth grade (Endean Memorial Shield) ===
Takapuna won the championship. It was to be the only grade win for the club in their history which lasted from 1921 to 1925. Richmond had beaten Takapuna 8-3 on July 22 but the match was ordered to be replayed by the league. Takapuna going on to win the title. Richmond defeated Takapuna on September 2 to win the knockout competition. The majority of the results were not reported so the standings are significantly incomplete.

Team	Pld	W	D	L	B	F	A	Pts
Takapuna	12	7	0	1	0	93	36	14
Richmond Rovers	12	7	0	1	1	90	36	14
Manukau Rovers	6	3	1	2	1	99	33	7
Newton Rangers	6	2	0	4	1	44	98	4
Ponsonby United	3	1	0	2	0	16	20	2
Northcote & Birkenhead Ramblers	5	1	0	4	3	11	61	2
Marist Old Boys	6	1	0	5	0	33	51	2
Devonport United	4	0	1	3	1	11	62	1

=== Sixth grade A ===
City Rovers A won the competition ahead of Richmond and Athletic. A standalone match was played between City and Athletic on September 16 to end the season and this was possible to decide the title. Northcote & Birkenhead Ramblers withdrew after 3 rounds. A large number of the results were not reported.

Team	Pld	W	D	L	B	F	A	Pts
City Rovers A	11	10	0	1	2	184	19	20
Richmond Rovers	8	6	0	2	3	113	24	12
Manukau Rovers	4	3	0	1	1	26	22	6
Marist Old Boys	5	2	0	3	3	46	43	4
Athletic	5	2	0	3	2	39	54	4
Kingsland Rovers	6	1	1	4	3	19	142	3
Otahuhu Rovers	5	1	0	4	3	25	46	2
Ponsonby United	2	1	0	1	3	7	18	2
Ellerslie United	6	0	1	5	2	0	88	1
Northcote & Birkenhead Ramblers	1	0	0	1	0	3	6	0

=== Sixth grade B ===
Athletic won the competition. The majority of match results were not reported so the standings are significantly incomplete. Athletic only had 3 match results reported and 2 of those were losses. Ponsonby defaulted in round 1 and withdrew from the competition so have not been included in the standings.

Team	Pld	W	D	L	B	F	A	Pts
Athletic	3	1	0	2	0	11	34	2
Richmond Rovers	6	5	0	1	1	70	31	10
Manukau Rovers	5	5	0	0	0	37	10	10
Parnell	7	3	0	4	0	47	34	6
City Rovers	5	0	0	5	1	18	53	0
Northcote & Birkenhead Ramblers	1	0	0	1	1	0	20	0

=== Cadet competition ===
22nd Company, based in the City won the competition. They sealed the title when they beat 36th Company (Northcote) with a 13-0 win on September 30. It was slightly confusing as teams went by different names, sometimes being referred to by their company number and sometimes by their geographical location, whilst City were also called "Athletic" on occasion. Then on July 8 a team joined the competition simply known as Takapuna. Presumably this was also a cadet side rather than the club team of the same name.

Team	Pld	W	D	L	B	F	A	Pts
22nd Eden Company	12	9	0	3	1	153	51	18
26th City (Athletic) Company	7	5	0	2	3	85	72	10
36th Northcote Company	7	3	0	4	1	40	76	6
29th Ponsonby Company	5	0	0	5	2	9	90	0
Takapuna	2	0	0	2	2	8	25	0

=== Wednesday Competition ===
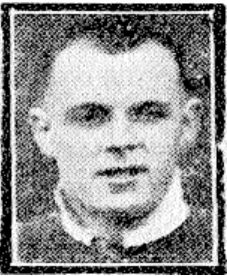
Wally Somers

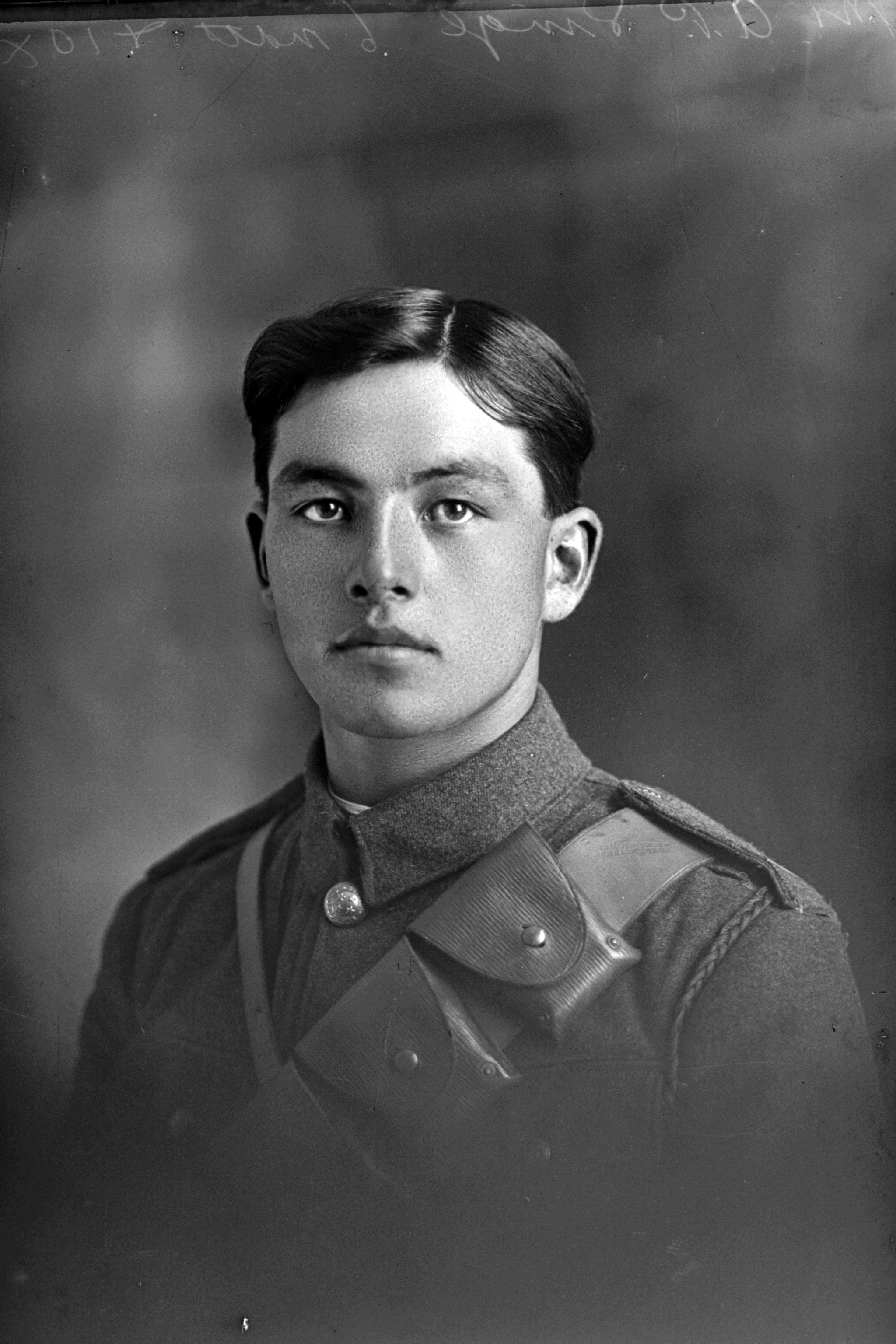
Arthur Singe

On September 13 a Taxi Drivers side beat Bakers 21-9 at Carlaw Park. A Bakers player (T. McPherson) broke his ankle and was taken home). On September 20 the Post and Telegraph side played against the Wednesday representative team as curtain-raiser to the Auckland Province - New South Wales match at Carlaw Park. Post and Telegraph won 33 to 11 with future New Zealand international Arthur Singe scoring 2 tries and kicking a conversion. Wally Somers was also in the Post and Telegraph side.

== Representative season ==
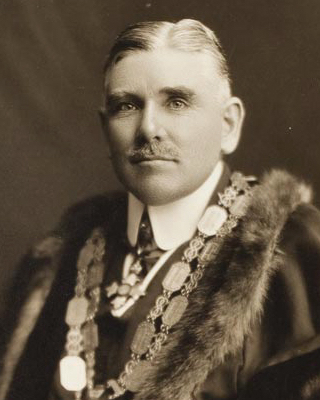
James Gunson

It was an extremely busy season for the Auckland representative side. They played ten matches in total, while many members of the side also played for the Auckland Provincial team, and an Auckland B team also played a match in Cambridge. Of the ten matches they lost 6 and won 4. The first representative fixture of the season was played on 20 May between Auckland and the Maori team which was preparing to visit Australia and play a series of matches. There were 7,000 in attendance and gate receipts totaled £297 2s 6d. On 19 June the touring Australian Universities Rugby League team arrived in Auckland on board the 'Manuka'. They were welcomed at a function at the Auckland Town Hall by a large assembly of Auckland politicians including the Mayor Mr. J.H. Gunson, and representatives of Auckland Rugby League and the New Zealand League Council. The Australians acquitted themselves well by beating Auckland twice, and losing to them once and a loss to the South Waikato team in Hamilton. The games were played over the space of just 8 days.

After the NZ Māori team returned from their tour of Australia seven members of their team were transferred to the Fire Brigade Club, though only four played in their round 9 match (Pitman, Gardner, Yeats and Te Whata).

History was made on 2 September when Auckland was defeated for the first time in a Northern Union Challenge Cup match. They had held the Cup for over a decade, but had to hand it over when they were defeated by South Auckland 21 to 20 on Carlaw Park in front of a large crowd. On 16 September they met the touring New South Wales team at the Auckland Domain and in front of a huge crowd of 20,000 they went down in a "tremendously fast and exciting game" by 45 points to 25.

=== Auckland v New Zealand Maori ===
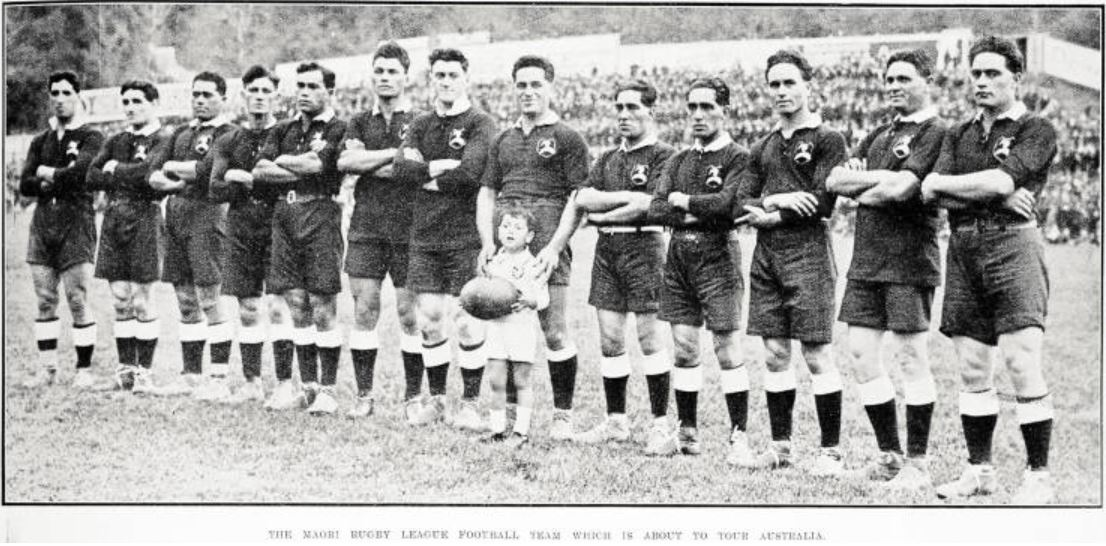
NZ Māori team with Bill Te Whata standing behind the ball boy. To his left is Craddock Dufty.

The Auckland team was not at full strength with 5 players originally selected unable to play. The New Zealand Māori team featured Bill Te Whata who joined the Fire Brigade (formerly Grafton Athletic) team after the tour and then later the Athletic (formerly Maritime) side. Also in the team was Craddock Dufty who became a huge figure in the game in the 1920s and 30s in Auckland where he played over 50 matches for New Zealand and 30 for Auckland, George Paki a long time City Rovers player who also had a stint at Richmond Rovers, and Sam Lowrie who played 149 games for Ponsonby along with several games for New Zealand and Auckland.

20 May	Auckland	18–28	New Zealand Maori	Carlaw Park 1
3:00	Try: John Lang 2, Clarrie Polson, Maurice Wetherill; Con: Bill Davidson 3		Try: Moses Yates, Remi Morrison, Craddock Dufty, Mason Lockwood 2, Bill Te Whata; Con: Craddock Dufty 2, Bill Te Whata; Pen: Craddock Dufty, Moses Yates	Attendance: 7,000; Referee: Billy Murray

=== Auckland v Australian Universities ===
The Australian University team was made up of players from Sydney University and Brisbane University.

21 June	Auckland	12–13	Australian Universities	Carlaw Park 1
3:00	Try: Ivan Littlewood, Nelson Bass; Con: Bill Davidson; Pen: Bill Davidson, Thomas McClymont		Try: T Lynskey, F Cripps, J Dunworth; Con: H Courtenay; Pen: J Craig	Referee: Bill Murray

=== Auckland v Australian Universities ===
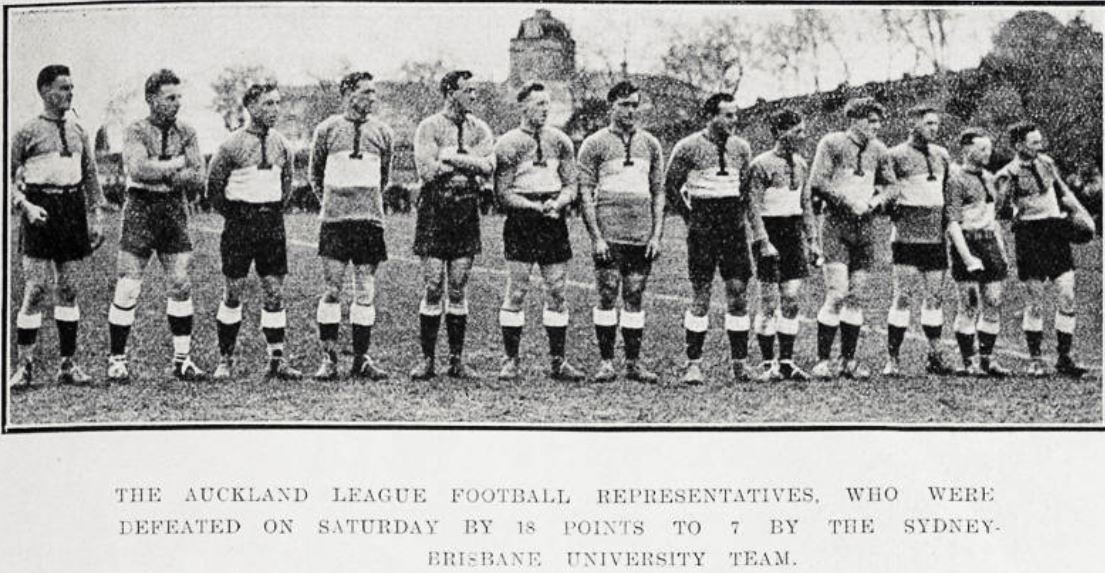

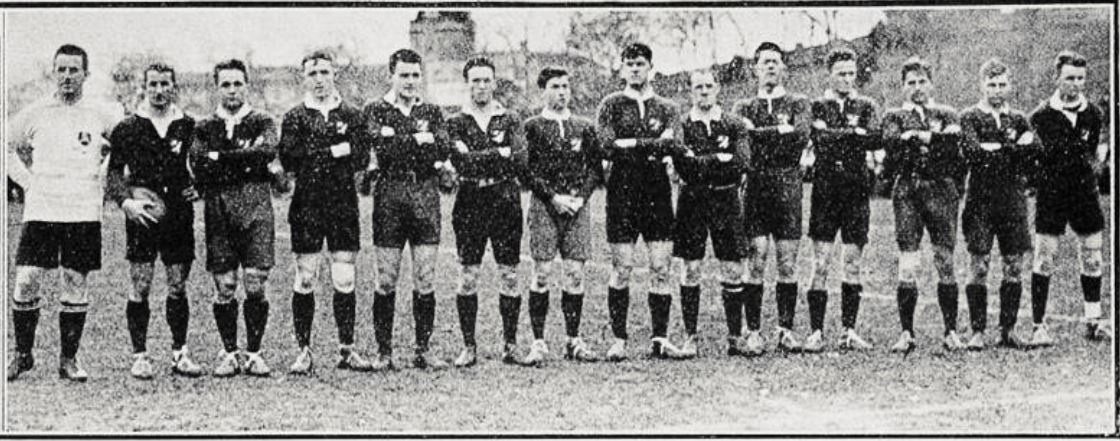
Australian Universities with Bert Gallagher, referee on the left.

Bill Stormont injured his knee during the match and was replaced by Ernie Herring. Herring took his place in the starting side for the third match due to the injury.

24 June	Auckland	7–18	Australian Universities	Auckland Domain
3:00	Try: Nelson Bass; Pen: Bill Davidson, Arthur Singe		Try: J Craig, Cunningham, F Cripps 2 Con: J Craig 2, H Courtenay	Attendance: 13,500; Referee: Bert Gallagher

=== Auckland v Australian Universities ===
Nelson Bass and Ivan Littlewood were originally named to start however Turner and John McGregor both took their places in the starting lineup.

28 June	Auckland	24–16	Australian Universities	Carlaw Park 1
3:00	Try: Eric Grey 3, Bert Avery 2, Maurice Wetherill; Con: Bill Davidson 3		Try: J Craig, Lynskey 2, Connaghan; Con: J Craig 2	Referee: Archie Ferguson

=== Auckland v Cambridge ===
Remarkably 12 of the 13 Auckland players scored points, with 8 separate players scoring tries and 4 others kicking one or more goal. The only player not to register any points for Auckland was second rower, Henry Hawkes.

26 July	Auckland	73–29	Cambridge	Carlaw Park 1
3:00	Try: Craddock Dufty, George Davidson 3, Nelson Bass 4, Maurice Wetherill, Bert Avery 3, Bill Davidson 2, Bert Laing 2, Sam Lowrie; Con: Craddock Dufty, George Davidson, Clarrie Polson 2, Nelson Bass, Bill Davidson, Bert Laing, Bill Stormont, Sam Lowrie, Arthur Singe, Stan Webb		Try: Lyall Stewart, C McMillan 2, Jackson, D Kelly; Con: H Shostrom, Lyall Stewart, C McMillan 3 Pen: C McMillan 2	Referee: Len Farrant

=== Auckland v Hawkes Bay (Northern Union Challenge Cup) ===
19 August	Auckland	23–5	Hawkes Bay	Carlaw Park
3:00	Try: George Davidson, Bert Avery, Maurice Wetherill, Frank Delgrosso, Harry Hawkes; Con: Bill Davidson 2 Pen: Bill Davidson and 1 mark		Try: N Gillies; Pen: Con McCarthy

=== Cambridge v Auckland B ===
William Southernwood of Ponsonby played for the Auckland B side. He would be tragically killed in a boating accident just prior to the start of the 1923 season which also claimed the lives of three other men. His team mate and New Zealand representative Bill Walsh survived the accident.

=== Cambridge v Auckland B ===
19 August	Cambridge	8-22	Auckland B	Victoria Square, Cambridge
3:00	Try: Everitt Campbell, Percy Hill; Con: C McMillan		Try: F Wilson 2, Stevens, Eric McGregor 2, Neville St George; Con: W Little, Walter Voysey	Referee: J McIvor

=== Auckland v South Auckland (Northern Union Challenge Cup) ===
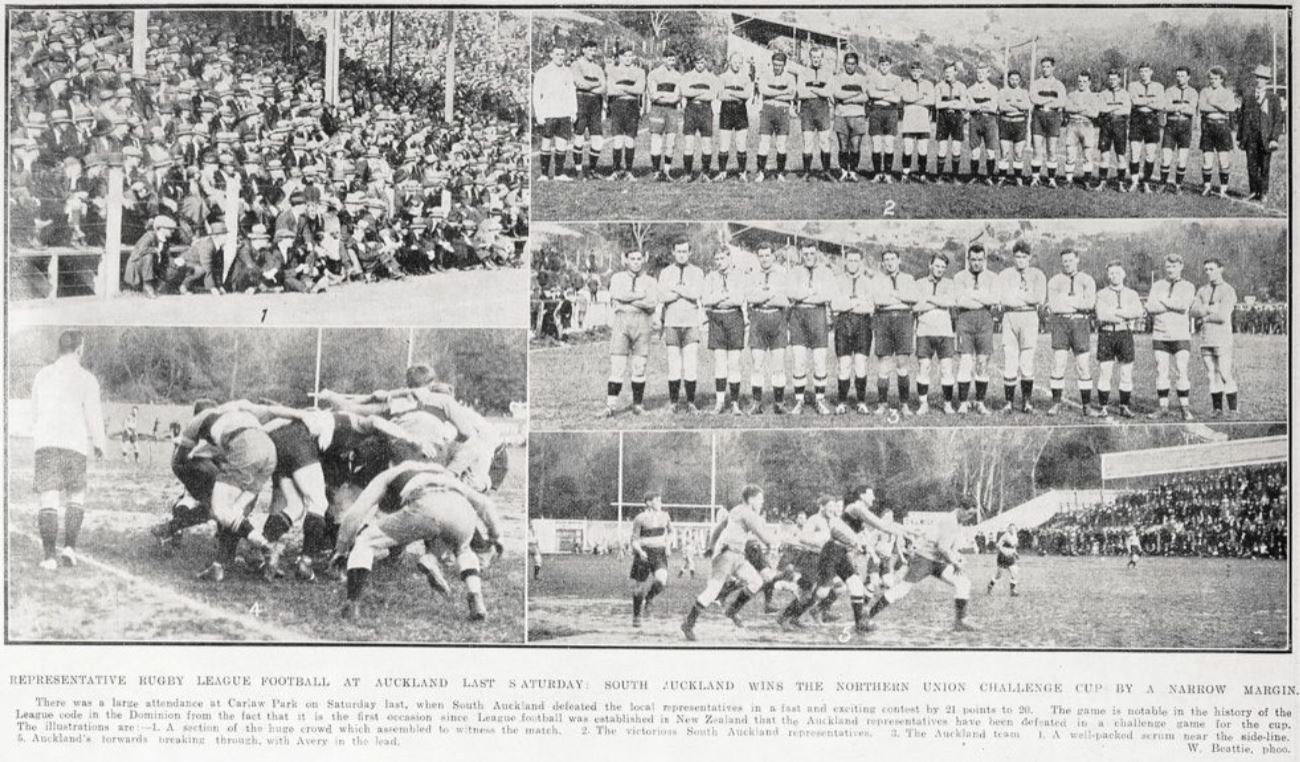

2 September	Auckland	20–21	South Auckland (Waikato)	Carlaw Park 1
3:00	Try: Craddock Dufty, George Davidson, Clarrie Polson, Harry Hawkes; Con: Craddock Dufty 3 Pen: Craddock Dufty		Try: Huatahi Paki 2, Wilson Hall; Con: Tonga Mahuta, Tim Peckham; Pen: Tonga Mahuta 4	Referee: Bert Gallagher

=== Auckland v New South Wales ===
Auckland played the touring New South Wales team in front of 20,000 spectators at the Auckland Domain but was heavily defeated with Australian legend Frank Burge running in 5 tries. George Davidson replaced his brother Bill Davidson in the starting side, and Lou Brown came on during the first half to replace the injured Frank Delgrosso, while for New South Wales O'Connor replaced Tye who was also injured in the first half.

16 September	Auckland	25–40	New South Wales	Auckland Domain
3:00	Try: Bert Avery 2, Ivan Littlewood, Lou Brown 2 Con: Craddock Dufty, Maurice Wetherill; Pen: Craddock Dufty 3		Try: Toohey, Ives, Latta 2, Gray, Frank Burge 5 Con: Horder 2, Frank Burge 3	Attendance: 5,500; Referee: Billy Murray

=== Auckland Province v New South Wales ===
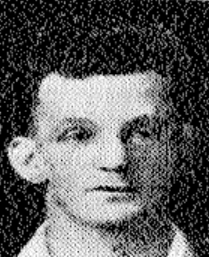
Tim Peckham

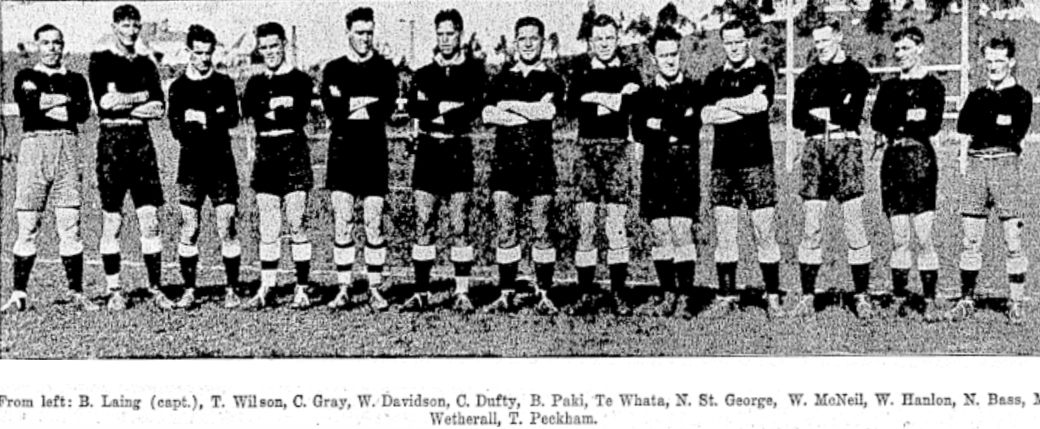

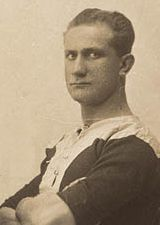
Frank Burge

A few days after the match with New South Wales an Auckland provincial team took on the touring side. This was the first ever Auckland provincial side which included Auckland club players and also players from the Waikato. The Auckland team was made up entirely of Auckland club players aside from former Auckland player Tim Peckham who was playing at Huntly. They also included Bill Te Whata who had played in Australia for the New Zealand Māori side and recently joined the Fire Brigade club in Auckland. They lost a tight match by 21 points to 20. Frank Burge was ordered off for disputing Wilson's try late in the match.

20 September	Auckland Province	20–21	New South Wales	Auckland Domain 1
3:00	Try: Bert Laing 2, Maurice Wetherill, F Wilson; Con: Craddock Dufty, Bill Davidson 2 Pen: Bill Davidson		Try: H Horder, W Toohey 2, B Grey, Frank Burge; Con: H Horder, Frank Burge 2	Attendance: 5500; Referee: Les Bull

=== South Auckland v Auckland (Northern Union Challenge Cup) ===
2 October	South Auckland (Waikato)	26–18	Auckland	Steele Park, Hamilton
3:00	Try: Hemmingway, Brownie Paki, Bishop, Wilson, Jackson, Guthrie; Con: Hemmingway 3, Wilson Hall 2		Try: George Davidson, Lou Brown, Ben Davidson, Nelson; Con: Maurice Wetherill, Clarrie Polson	Attendance: 2500; Referee: A Harlock

=== Bay of Plenty v Auckland ===
7 October	Bay of Plenty	26–33	Auckland	Tauranga
3:00	Try: Morrison, George Iles, H Hume, George Gardiner, D Barclay, Ahomiro; Con: George Gardiner 2, Ahomiro; Pen: George Gardiner		Try: Lou Brown 3, J Johnson, Clarrie Polson, F Wilson, Wally Somers; Con: Mike Flynn, Charles Webb 2, Clarrie Polson 2 Pen: Charles Webb	Referee: A Crane

== Auckland representative matches played and scorers ==
=== Auckland ===
No	Name	Club	Play	Tries	Con	Pen	Mark	Points
1	Bill Davidson	City	6	2	10	3	1	34
2	Craddock Dufty	Athletic	4	2	5	4	0	24
2	Bert Avery	Athletic	7	8	0	0	0	24
4	Nelson Bass	Marist	6	6	1	0	0	20
4	George Davidson	City	6	6	1	0	0	20
6	Clarrie Polson	Newton	8	3	5	0	0	19
7	Lou Brown	Newton	4	6	0	0	0	18
8	Maurice Wetherill	City	9	4	2	0	0	16
9	Eric Grey	Athletic	1	3	0	0	0	9
10	Bert Laing	Devonport	5	2	1	0	0	8
11	Harry Hawkes	City	7	2	0	0	0	6
11	John Lang	Marist	4	2	0	0	0	6
11	Charles Webb	Athletic	1	0	2	1	0	6
11	Ivan Littlewood	Ponsonby	3	2	0	0	0	6
15	Sam Lowrie	Ponsonby	2	1	1	0	0	5
16	Arthur Singe	Marist	5	0	1	1	0	4
17	Frank Delgrosso	Ponsonby	4	1	0	0	0	3
17	Wally Somers	Newton	6	1	0	0	0	3
17	Ben Davidson	City	2	1	0	0	0	3
17	F Wilson	City	2	1	0	0	0	3
17	A Nelson	Marist	1	1	0	0	0	3
17	J Johnson	Devonport	2	1	0	0	0	3
23	Bill Stormont	Marist	5	0	1	0	0	2
23	Stan Webb	Devonport	2	0	1	0	0	2
23	Mike Flynn	Athletic	1	0	1	0	0	2
26	Frank Turner	Marist	3	0	0	0	0	0
26	Thomas McClymont	Ponsonby	2	0	0	0	0	0
26	Ernie Herring	Fire Brigade	2	0	0	0	0	0
26	John McGregor	Athletic	2	0	0	0	0	0
26	William Hanlon	Ponsonby	2	0	0	0	0	0
26	Harry Douglas	Devonport	2	0	0	0	0	0
26	Charles Woolley	Fire Brigade	1	0	0	0	0	0
26	Percy Gallagher	Marist	1	0	0	0	0	0
26	George Duane	Marist	1	0	0	0	0	0
26	C Nicholson	Newton	1	0	0	0	0	0
26	George Reid	City	1	0	0	0	0	0
26	Harrison	Devonport	1	0	0	0	0	0
26	Alf Scott	Devonport	1	0	0	0	0	0
26	Ernie Mackie	City	1	0	0	0	0	0
26	C "Chook" Mitchell	City	1	0	0	0	0	0
26	Charles Hand	Devonport	1	0	0	0	0	0
26	Neville St George	Devonport	1	0	0	0	0	0
26	Jim O'Brien	Devonport United	1	0	0	0	0	0
26	Brady	Fire Brigade	1	0	0	0	0	0

=== Auckland Province ===
No	Name	Club Team	Play	Tries	Con	Pen	Points
1	Bill Davidson	City	1	0	2	1	6
1	Bert Laing	Devonport	1	2	0	0	6
3	Maurice Wetherill	City	1	1	0	0	3
3	F Wilson	City	1	1	0	0	3
5	Craddock Dufty	Athletic	1	0	1	0	2
6	George Paki	City	1	0	0	0	0
6	Eric Grey	Athletic	1	0	0	0	0
6	Nelson Bass	Marist	1	0	0	0	0
6	Tim Peckham	Huntly (Waikato)	1	0	0	0	0
6	William Hanlon	Ponsonby	1	0	0	0	0
6	Neville St George	Devonport	1	0	0	0	0
6	Bill Te Whata	Fire Brigade	1	0	0	0	0
6	Wilfred McNeill	Ponsonby	1	0	0	0	0

=== Auckland B ===
No	Name	Club Team	Play	Tries	Con	Pen	Points
1	Eric McGregor	Ponsonby	1	2	0	0	6
1	F Wilson	City	1	2	0	0	6
3	Stevens	Marist	1	1	0	0	3
3	W Little	Richmond	1	0	1	0	2
5	Walter Voysey	Newton	1	0	1	0	2
6	William Hanlon	Ponsonby	1	1	0	0	3
6	F Gregory	Newton	1	0	0	0	0
6	Tommy Taylor	Devonport	1	0	0	0	0
6	C "Chook" Mitchell	City	1	0	0	0	0
6	Eric Carroll	Richmond	1	0	0	0	0
6	Ernie Mackie	City	1	0	0	0	0
6	Neville St George	Devonport	1	0	0	0	0
6	William Southernwood	Ponsonby	1	0	0	0	0
