= 1918 New Zealand rugby league season =

Seasons
- ← 1917 1919 →

The 1918 New Zealand rugby league season was the 11th season of rugby league that had been played in New Zealand.

== International competitions ==
New Zealand played no international matches in 1918.

== National competitions ==
=== Northern Union Cup ===
Auckland again held the Northern Union Cup at the end of the season.

== Club competitions ==
=== Auckland ===
Ponsonby won the Auckland Rugby League's competition. City won the Roope Rooster.

Ponsonby then traveled to Canterbury and won the Thacker Shield from Sydenham, winning 11–0. Ponsonby included Sam Lowrie, Thomas McClymont and Bill Walsh.

Railway XIII had merged with Grafton Athletic at the start of the year. Karl Ifwersen played for Grafton.

=== Canterbury ===
Sydenham won the Canterbury Rugby League's competition, for which they were awarded the Thacker Shield.

Avon and Woolston joined the Canterbury Rugby League during the season.

=== Other Competitions ===
The Wellington Rugby League's competition was suspended from 1916 until 1918.
