= George Davidson (athlete) =

NZ rugby league footballer & Olympic sprinter

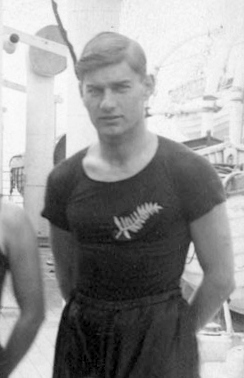
- George Davidson in 1920

Personal information
- Full name: George Davidson
- Born: 8 October 1898 Auckland, New Zealand
- Died: 25 September 1948 (aged 49) Piopio, New Zealand

Playing information
- Position: Wing
Club
Years	Team	Pld	T	G	FG	P
1917	City Rovers	1	0	0	0	0
1918–1919	Maritime	20	19	13	0	83
1922–1925	City Rovers	54	40	15	0	150
	Total	75	59	28	0	233
Representative
Years	Team	Pld	T	G	FG	P
1918–1924	Auckland	15	17	2	0	55
- Source: RLP
- Relatives: Ben Davidson (brother); Bill Davidson (brother)

George Davidson (8 October 1898 – 25 September 1948) was a New Zealand sprinter and rugby league player. He competed in the 1920 Summer Olympics and finished fifth in the 200 metres competition. He also participated in the 100 metres event where he was eliminated in the quarter-finals. His Olympic participation was hindered due to the time it took to travel from NZ to Belgium for the games. American athletic coach Ike Kelly said of Davidson that if he was able to coach him for 6 months, he would have turned him into a world champion.

Davidson's brothers Bill and Ben both represented New Zealand at rugby league, and George himself played for the City and Maritime clubs in the Auckland Rugby League competition and represented Auckland between 1919 and 1922. George was selected for the 1919 New Zealand tour of Australia but was unable to travel and was replaced by former All Black Dougie McGregor.

George Davidson played for Maritime but after returning from the Antwerp Olympics he requested a transfer to join his brothers on the City Rovers team. Maritime opposed this but the Auckland Rugby League requested that they reconsider and during the 1922 season he was granted a transfer.

He was associated with Sharland and Company Limited for 21 years before leaving in February 1938.
