= George Loveridge =

- Born: 15 October 1890 New Plymouth, New Zealand
- Died: 28 November 1970 (aged 80) New Plymouth, New Zealand
- Height: 1.71 m (5 ft 7 1/4 in)
- Weight: 68 kg (149 lb)
- Occupation: Public servant

Rugby union career
- Position: Wing three-quarter
Provincial / State sides
Years	Team	Apps	(Points)
1912–15	Taranaki	16	
International career
Years	Team	Apps	(Points)
1913–14	New Zealand	0	(0)

George Loveridge (15 October 1890 – 28 November 1970) was a New Zealand rugby union player. A wing three-quarter, Loveridge represented Taranaki at a provincial level, and was a member of the New Zealand national side, the All Blacks, in 1913 and 1914. He played 11 matches for the All Blacks but did not appear in any internationals.

During World War I, Loveridge—a telegraphist before the war—served overseas as a sapper with the New Zealand Field Engineers from 1916 to 1919. He served again during World War II as a sergeant with 2nd Battalion Taranaki Regiment, carrying out administrative duties in New Zealand between 1942 and 1943.

George's cousin, Norm Loveridge, represented New Zealand at rugby league.
