= Dick McGregor =

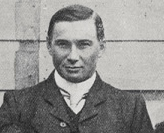
- Full name: Robert Wylie McGregor
- Born: 31 December 1874 Thames, New Zealand
- Died: 22 November 1925 (aged 50) Sydney, Australia
- Notable relative: Dougie McGregor (nephew)

Rugby union career
- Position: Centre / Fullback
International career
Years	Team	Apps	(Points)
1903–04	New Zealand	2	(3)

Robert Wylie McGregor (31 December 1874 — 22 November 1925) was a New Zealand rugby union international.

== Biography ==
McGregor, the youngest of six brothers, was born in Thames, Waikato.

An Auckland provincial player, McGregor was a versatile back, principally playing at centre. He was capped twice by the All Blacks, debuting as a centre against Australia at the Sydney Cricket Ground in 1903 and scored a try in the 22–3 win. His second cap came as a fullback against Great Britain the following year in Wellington.

McGregor was an uncle of All Black Dougie McGregor.

== See also ==
- List of New Zealand national rugby union players
