= Norm Loveridge =

New Zealand rugby league footballer (1892–1956)

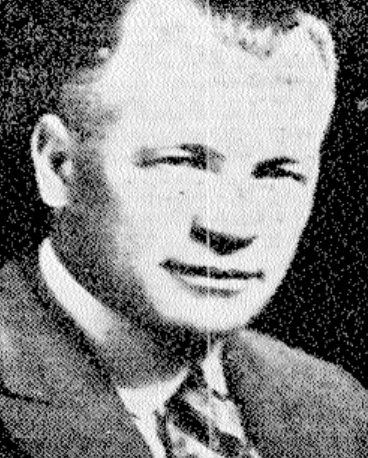

Personal information
- Full name: Norman William Loveridge
- Born: 11 March 1892 New Plymouth, New Zealand
- Died: 21 October 1956 (aged 64) Auckland, New Zealand

Playing information

Rugby league
- Position: Fullback, Halfback
Club
Years	Team	Pld	T	G	FG	P
1920–22	Marist Old Boys ARL	24	3	5	0	19
Representative
Years	Team	Pld	T	G	FG	P
1920	North Island	1	0	0	0	0
1919	New Zealand	1	0	0	0	0

Rugby union
Club
Years	Team	Pld	T	G	FG	P
1914–15	Tukapa (Taranaki)
1919	Athletic (Wellington)		1	0	0	3
1919	Wellington Tramways	3	3	1	0	12
	Total	3	4	1	0	15

Norman William Loveridge (11 March 1892 – 21 October 1956) was the 141st New Zealand international rugby league player. He played one test for New Zealand against the touring England team in 1920 at fullback.

== Early life ==
Norm Loveridge was born on 11 March 1892. His parents were Willie and Emma Loveridge. He was raised in New Plymouth, New Zealand and was a cousin of All Black George Loveridge.

== Playing career ==
=== Rugby union ===
Loveridge began playing rugby for the Tukapa club in New Plymouth. His name first appears in their 1st junior side in 1914 and he played for them again in 1915.

It is unclear whether he continued playing over the ensuing years as there is no clear mention of his name in any teams, and during the war rugby competitions and particularly representative fixtures were not played as often as pre-war.

By 1919 he had moved to Wellington with his family where he began working on the Wellington trams. He played for the Athletic Club in the Wellington competition. He scored a try in a match against the Wellington Football Club. On 24 July he played for the Wellington Tramways Football Team in a game against the Star rugby side from Taranaki in New Plymouth. Loveridge was captain for the match which was played at Pukekura Park in Loveridge's home town. Loveridge scored a try and kicked a penalty in a 10–9 win in front of 1,000 people. The Wellington Tramways team then moved on to Auckland where they beat the local side 11 to 3 to claim the Kohn Cup (played for among representative tramway sides) at Victoria Park. They then drove in a series of cars down to Wanganui where they took on a Wanganui Tramway XV and won by 20 points to 3 with Loveridge scoring two tries, including one after securing the ball near Wanganui's 25m line and scoring "between the posts after a fine cutting in run".

=== Switch to rugby league ===
In 1920 Loveridge moved to Auckland. He began playing for the Marist Old Boys rugby league club where in his first game he was described as “the Wellington man”. He scored a try for them in a match against the Newton Rangers at Victoria Park which was drawn 5-5. In June he was listed in the reserves for the Auckland team to play the Rest of New Zealand team (also named South) but he did not take the field. He was again named in the Auckland reserves for the Auckland match against the touring England team but did not take the field.

After the resumption of the Auckland club competition Loveridge scored a try in a July match for Marist against Maritime after a “clever, dodgy run”. He was named in the New Zealand reserves for the first test against England but like the previous occasions he was not called on to play.

He played for North Island against England on 4 August at McLean Park in Napier. The North Island were thrashed 46 to 5 with Loveridge playing in the three-quarters. Then just three days later on 7 August Loveridge travelled to Christchurch to make his test debut for New Zealand. The match was played at Lancaster Park with 6,000 spectators present. New Zealand went down 19 to 3 with Loveridge playing at fullback. Loveridge's performance at fullback came in for some comment by the scribes of the time. The general consensus being that he was too hesitant in the fullback position and hung on to the ball too long. The writer for the Sun (Christchurch) said that he was “weak”, and that “he misjudged several kicks, and was tackled in possession on a number of occasions. In addition he missed his man two or three times through lack of determination”. The writer for the Star said that “Loveridge nearly had the team in difficulties through holding on too long. By a stroke of good luck however he was able to relieve the position by marking just in front of the posts”. The Lyttelton Times writer described a passage of play where “Loveridge failed to beat Wagstaff before kicking. He was collared, and it looked as if the Englishmen were likely to score” and later a passing rush by England “ended in Stone side stepping Loveridge and dashing over at the corner.

This was to be his only test match for New Zealand. In fact Loveridge did not even pull on the Auckland jersey. In 1921 and 1922 he continued to play for Marist in the Auckland Rugby League competition. He scored a try in a 27-15 win over Richmond at the Auckland Domain and he kicked five goals in other matches. Loveridge stopped playing for Marist at the end of this season and does not appear to have played again. In 1927 he was reinstated into rugby but it is unlikely that he pulled on the boots again officially due to work commitments and he was aged 35 by this point.

== Personal life ==
=== Marriage and children ===
Norm Loveridge married Myrtle Francis Manley on 25 March 1913. They had a son, Darrell William (1913-1966), and another son, Raymond Louvain (1915-1921), however Raymond died at just six years of age. Six years later in 1919 they had a daughter named Veronica Myrtle Elizabeth (1918-1976).

In 1918 Loveridge was required to serve in the military but he appealed on the grounds of "undue hardship (family reasons)" with the case adjourned until the next sitting of the Wellington Military Service Board. Two weeks later they met again and decided to "recommend leave till the January draft". As the war ended in November 1918 there was to be no January draft. On 5 December 1920 the Loveridges had another son with the birth of Ian James (1921–1945). He was killed in World War II on 26 April 1945, aged 25. Ian was a wireless operator/air gunner for the RNZAF. He was on an aircraft which brought back one of the first groups of freed POWs. They had then taken off from Wing, in Buckinghamshire when it hit a tree just after taking off and crashed near Northampton.

In the early 1920s Norm Loveridge's wife obtained a separation order after he had failed to “maintain his wife”. They were then divorced, with Norm remarrying in 1926 to Helen Eliza Woodman (1893–1980).

=== Working life ===
In 1918 Loveridge was working as a tram conductor in Newtown, Wellington and living at 48 Owen Street. He represented the Wellington Tramways rugby team in 1919 on a Northern Tour to Taranaki, Auckland, and Wanganui. In 1926 after retirement from his playing days he began managing the Dixieland Cabaret at Point Chevalier. In November 1928 he was forced to step down as the manager due to ill health. He was said to be going to Sydney for a couple of months to recover and he hoped to return to work after that. In 1928 the census stated that he was living in Point Chevalier and working as a tea kiosk proprietor. In 1930 he was appointed the manager of the newly opening Peter Pan Cabaret in the Campbell Building on Rutland Street, Auckland central. The venue opened on 21 August of that year.

=== Death ===
After working in Auckland he moved to south Auckland and worked as a farmer. The 1935 census listed him as living at Paerata and working as a farmer which he did so through to at least 1938. From 1946 onwards he was farming in Drury. Norm Loveridge died on October 22, 1956, aged 63 and was buried in Papakura.
