= Ben Davidson (rugby league) =

New Zealand international rugby league footballer (1902-1961)

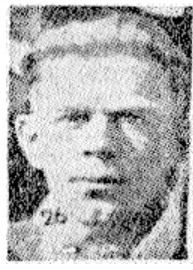

Personal information
- Full name: Benjamin Alfred Davidson
- Born: 1902 Auckland, New Zealand
- Died: 1961 (aged 58–59)

Playing information
- Height: 173 cm (5 ft 8 in)
- Weight: 75 kg (11 st 11 lb)
- Position: Wing, Centre
Club
Years	Team	Pld	T	G	FG	P
1919–27	City Rovers	101	68	9	5	232
1920	Devonport XIII (guest)	1	1	0	0	3
1927–30	Wigan	67	31	0	0	93
1930–33	City Rovers	46	15	2	1	51
	Total	215	115	11	6	379
Representative
Years	Team	Pld	T	G	FG	P
1921–32	Auckland	19	22	0	1	68
1926–32	New Zealand (tests)	24 (2)	14 (1)	0	0	42 (3)
1925–26	North Island	2	2	0	0	6

Coaching information
Representative
Years	Team	Gms	W	D	L	W%
1931	Northland	1	1	0	0	100
1934	City Rovers	16	5	0	11	31
- Source: As of 19 April 2020
- Relatives: Bill Davidson (brother); George Davidson (brother)

Benjamin Alfred Davidson (1902–1961) was a New Zealand rugby league footballer who represented New Zealand.

His brother Bill also represented New Zealand and another brother, George, played for Auckland and competed in the 1920 Summer Olympics as a sprinter.

== Playing career ==
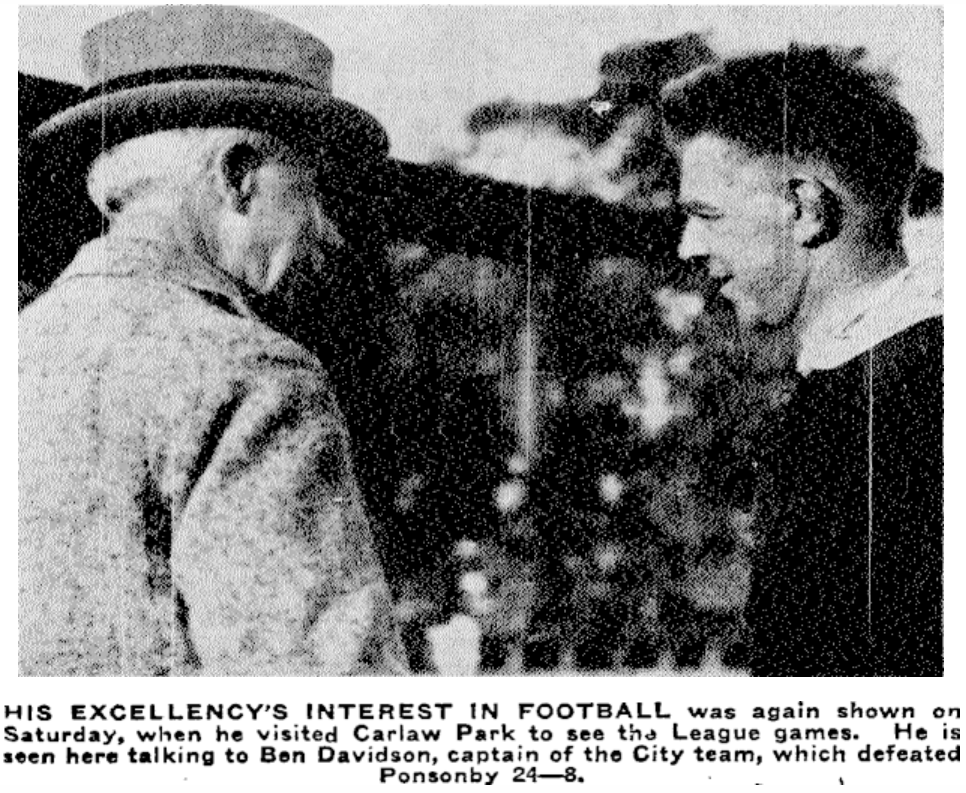
Davidson meeting the Governor General, Lord Bledisloe at Carlaw Park on 10 May 1930.

Alongside his brothers, Davidson played for the City Rovers in the Auckland Rugby League competition. He played for Auckland City in 1923 against the touring Great Britain Lions.

He was selected for the New Zealand national rugby league team on their 1926-27 tour of Great Britain.

Along with Lou Brown and Len Mason, Davidson was signed by Wigan after the tour. Davidson played there for three seasons, scoring 31 tries in 69 games.

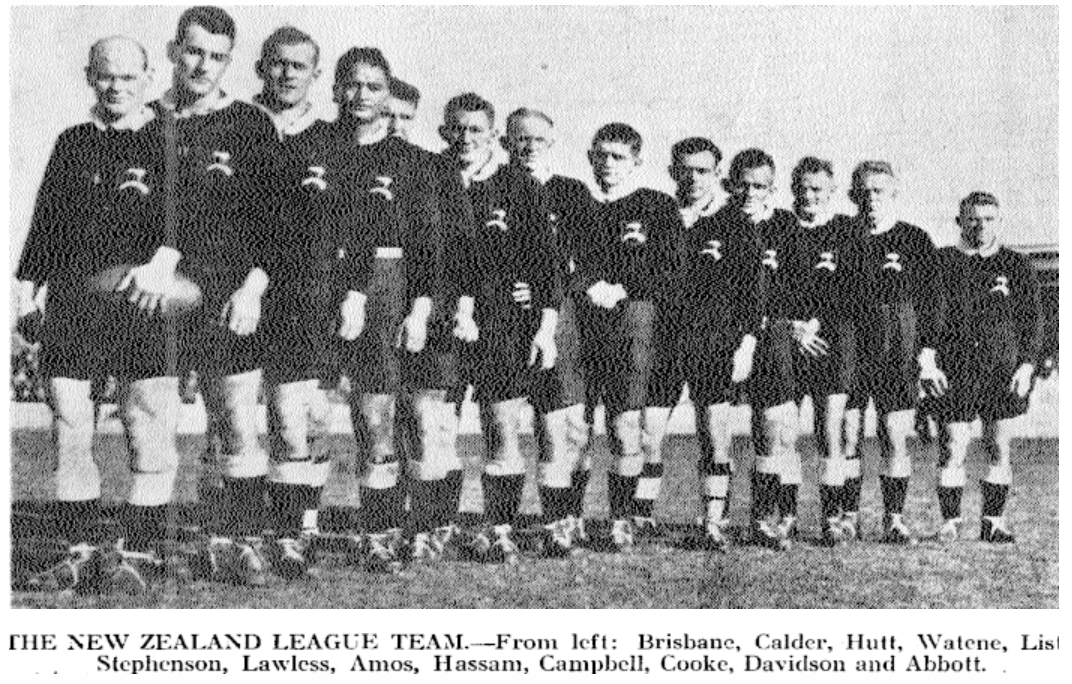

He then returned to Auckland. Davidson again made the Auckland side and in 1932 played for New Zealand against the Great Britain Lions. He finished his test career having played in four matches.

=== Coaching career ===
In 1931 Ben Davidson coached the Northland representative side for 2 weeks to help them prepare for their Northern Union Challenge Cup match with South Auckland. Northland won the game 16-8. Three years later in 1934 he coached the City Rovers club for the season in the Auckland Rugby League competition.
