= Bill Scott (rugby league) =

New Zealand international rugby league footballer

Personal information
- Full name: William Arthur Scott
- Born: 24 September 1896
- Died: unknown

Playing information
- Weight: 12 st 2 lb (77 kg)

Rugby union
Club
Years	Team	Pld	T	G	FG	P
1918	Berhampore
1922	Berhampore
	Total	0	0	0	0	0

Rugby league
- Position: Prop, Loose forward
Club
Years	Team	Pld	T	G	FG	P
1919–20	Suburbs	15	8	0	0	24
1921	Athletic	5	0	0	0	0
	Total	20	8	0	0	24
Representative
Years	Team	Pld	T	G	FG	P
1919–21	Wellington	7	0	0	0	0
1919–20	New Zealand	4	1	0	0	3
1920	North Island	1	0	0	0	0
1920–21	Wellington Town	2	1	0	0	3

William Arthur Scott (birth unknown – death unknown) was a New Zealand professional rugby league footballer who played in the 1910s and 1920s. He played at representative level for New Zealand, and Wellington, as a prop or loose forward.

== Playing career ==
=== International honours ===
Scott represented New Zealand in 1919 against Australia (3 matches), and in 1920 against Great Britain.
