= Nelson Bass =

New Zealand international rugby league footballer

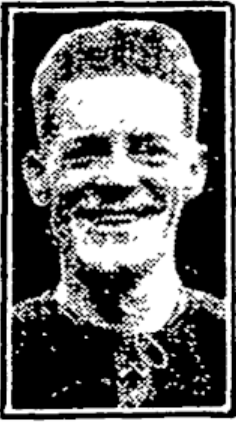

Personal information
- Full name: Nelson Charles Bass
- Born: 29 September 1894 Nelson, New Zealand
- Died: 23 August 1963 (aged 68)

Playing information
- Weight: 78.9 kg (12 st 6 lb)
- Position: Loose forward
Club
Years	Team	Pld	T	G	FG	P
1919–21	Newton Rangers	21	6	0	0	18
1922–23	Marist Old Boys	19	4	3	0	18
1924–30	City Rovers	49	12	18	1	74
	Total	89	22	21	1	110
Representative
Years	Team	Pld	T	G	FG	P
1919–25	Auckland	21	11	2	0	37
1919–1922	Auckland Province	2	0	0	0	0
1919–21	New Zealand (tests)	7 (4)	1	0	0	3
1925	North Island	1	0	0	0	0
- Source: As of 2020-03-12

Nelson Bass (1894–1963) was a New Zealand rugby league player who represented New Zealand in four test matches between 1919 and 1921.

== Playing career ==
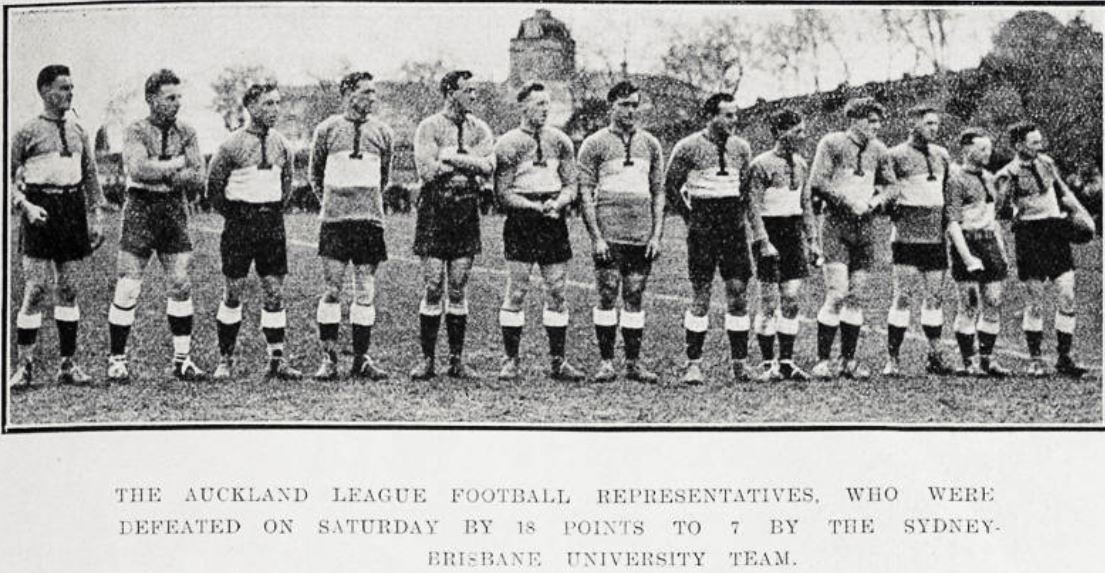
Bass is 6th from the left in the Auckland team to play the 2nd match against the Australian Universities side at the Auckland Domain on 24 June 1922.

Bass played for the Newton Rangers club in the Auckland Rugby League competition for 4 seasons (1919–1922) before transferring to the Marist Old Boys in 1923. He again transferred at the conclusion of the 1923 season, this time to the City Rovers. Bass played in four test matches for New Zealand between 1919 and 1921, against Australia and Great Britain.

Bass also represented Auckland, including in losses to Australia and New South Wales and a 24–16 win over Great Britain in 1920. In 1925 he captained Auckland City in an 11–24 loss to Great Britain.

In a 3rd round match for City Rovers in the first grade competition against Ponsonby United in 1927 Bass tore his knee cartilage which forced his early retirement.
