= Bill Davidson (rugby league) =

New Zealand rugby league footballer and administrator

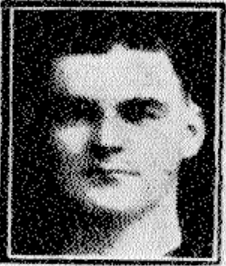

Personal information
- Full name: William John Davidson
- Born: 21 January 1897 Auckland, New Zealand
- Died: 13 July 1977 (aged 80) Auckland, New Zealand

Playing information
- Position: Fullback, Centre
Club
| Years | Team | Pld | T | G | FG | P |
|---|---|---|---|---|---|---|
| 1915–23 | City Rovers | 88 | 50 | 151 | 1 | 454 |
| 1915 | Thames Old Boys (exhibition) | 1 | 2 | 1 | 0 | 8 |
| 1917 | City/Newton (exhibition) | 1 | 1 | 0 | 0 | 3 |
| 1917 | Combined (City, Newton, N Shore) | 1 | 0 | 4 | 0 | 8 |
| | Total | 91 | 53 | 156 | 1 | 473 |
Representative
| Years | Team | Pld | T | G | FG | P |
| 1920–23 | Auckland | 12 | 11 | 24 | 0 | 83 |
| 1922 | Auckland Province | 1 | 0 | 3 | 0 | 6 |
| 1919–21 | New Zealand | 16 | 7 | 29 | 0 | 79 |

Coaching information
Club
| Years | Team | Gms | W | D | L | W% |
| 1938 | Ponsonby United | 20 | 10 | 0 | 10 | 50 |
| 1948 | City Rovers |
| | Total | 20 | 10 | 0 | 10 | 50 |
Representative
| Years | Team | Gms | W | D | L | W% |
| 1924 | Auckland | 5 | 3 | 0 | 2 | 60 |
| 1927 | Buller | 1 | 0 | 0 | 1 | 0 |
- Source: As of 2 September 2022
- Relatives: Ben Davidson (brother); George Davidson (brother)

Bill Davidson is a New Zealand rugby league footballer who represented New Zealand.

A brother, Ben, also played for New Zealand while another brother, George, represented New Zealand at the 1920 Olympic Games.

== Rugby league ==
=== Playing career ===
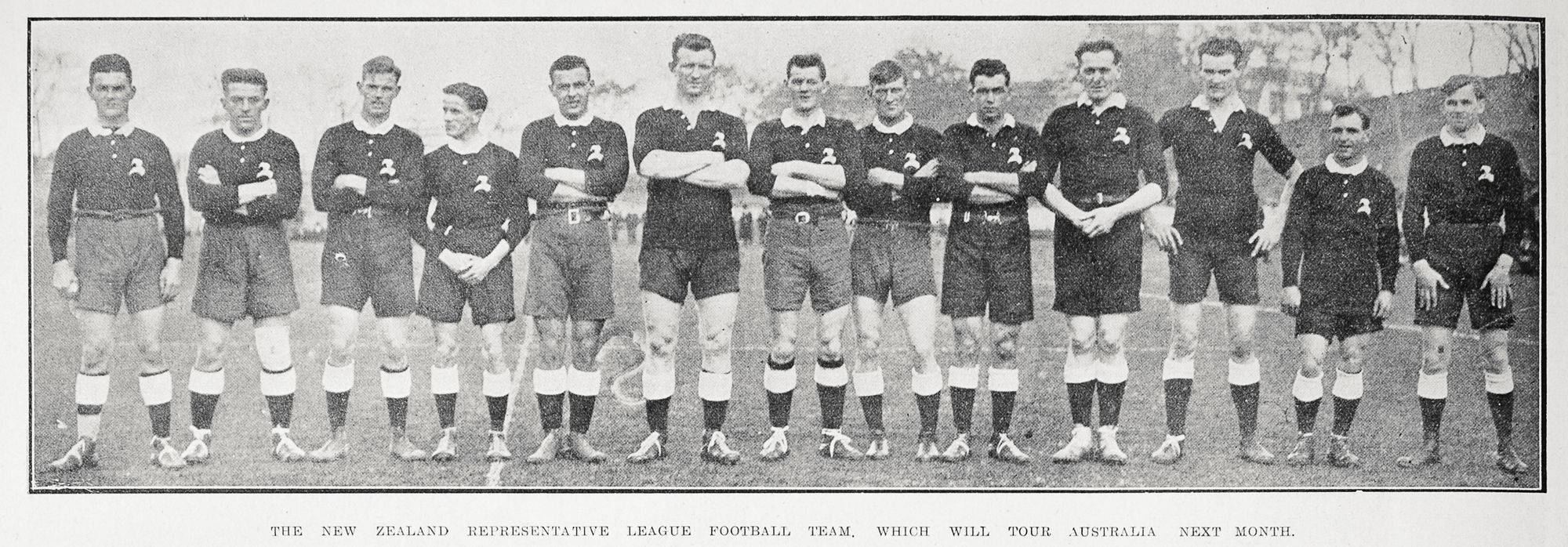
Davidson on the left in the 'New Zealand' team to play Auckland on 21 May 1921.

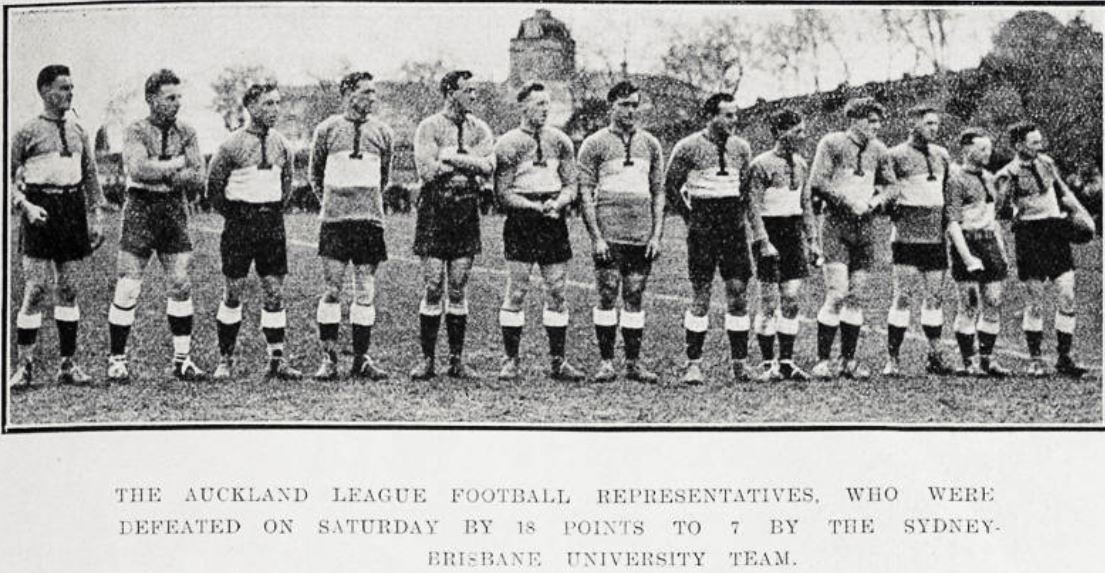
Davidson on the left in the Auckland team to play the 2nd match against the Australian Universities side at the Auckland Domain on 24 June 1922.

A goal kicking fullback, Davidson played for the City Rovers between 1915 and 1923 in the Auckland Rugby League competition. Even as a young player his goal kicking became well known. In 1914 when he was still in the City 2nd Grade team he was reported thus: "this boy, Davidson, of City, is said to be a remarkable place kicker and half a dozen goals in one afternoon has been no uncommon achievement for him this season. He kicks them from all angles and all ranges, and many old players and officials have described him as easily the best goal kicker in Auckland". He made his first grade debut in Round 1 of the 1915 season and scored a try, however because of his age he was deemed still too young (18) for the top side and spent the rest of the year in City's champion second grade team. At the end of the season he was selected in the three quarters for the Junior Auckland side to play Junior Waikato.

Davidson represented Auckland and scored 5 tries in his debut against Canterbury. He also played in a 1919 defeat of Australia, a 1920 victory over the Great Britain Lions and a 1923 tour of the South Island.

In 1919 he was first picked for New Zealand, playing against the touring Australians. He played his second test match in 1920, against Great Britain.

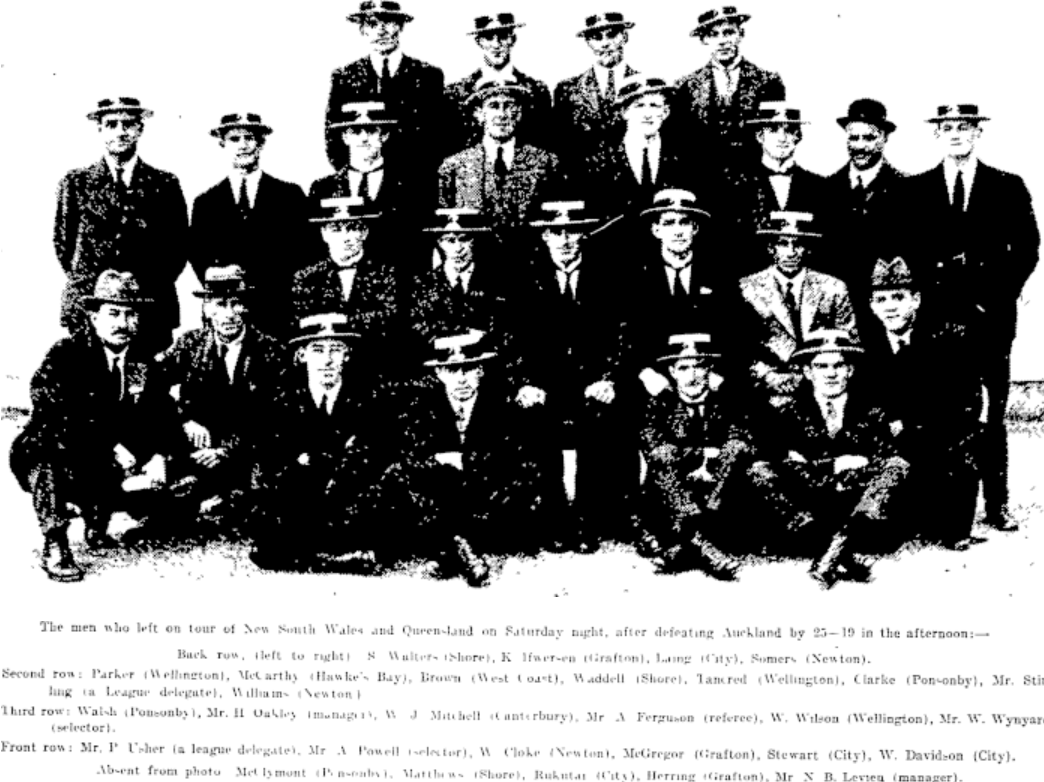
The 1919 New Zealand team to tour New South Wales and Queensland. Bill Davidson is sitting on the ground on the extreme right.

In 1922 he played for Auckland against the touring New South Wales team where Auckland lost 40 points to 25. He played against the same team days later for the Auckland Provincial team who also went down by 21 points to 20.

=== Coaching career ===
In 1927 Davidson coached the Buller side in their match against Auckland. Buller were badly outmatched and lost heavily but still managed to score 33 points in the 60-33 result. In 1938 he coached the Ponsonby United team along with fellow ex-New Zealand international Gordon Campbell.

== Administration career ==
Davidson later served as an administrator in league, swimming and athletics. He represented the City Rovers on the Auckland Rugby League board and also represented the Canterbury Rugby League on the New Zealand Rugby League Board.
