= Sam Lowrie =

New Zealand international rugby league footballer

Personal information
- Full name: Samuel Arthur Lowrie
- Born: 6 September 1889; Thames, Waikato, New Zealand
- Died: 7 February 1954 (aged 64); Auckland, New Zealand

Playing information
- Height: 5 ft 7 in (1.70 m)
- Weight: 12 st 0 lb (76 kg; 168 lb)
- Position: Hooker, Second-row
Club
Years	Team	Pld	T	G	FG	P
1914–27	Ponsonby	153	16	1	0	50
Representative
Years	Team	Pld	T	G	FG	P
1919–22	Auckland	8	1	1	0	5
1919–25	New Zealand	6	0	0	0	0
1922	New Zealand Māori	7	2	0	0	6

Coaching information
Representative
Years	Team	Gms	W	D	L	W%
1929	Ponsonby United	19	14	1	4	74

Samuel Arthur Lowrie (1889-1954) was a New Zealand rugby league player who represented New Zealand. His grandnephew, Jason Lowrie, also represented New Zealand in rugby league.

== Personal life ==
Sam Lowrie was born on 6 September 1889, in Thames. His parents were Samuel Lowrie (1854-1913) and Johanne Donnelly (1868-1933). He had 12 siblings; William Ernest Lowrie (1886-1959), Mary Helena Lowrite (1887-1954), Alice Hannah Lowrie (1891-1962), Millicent Ellenor Lowrie (1893-1969), Annie Elizabeth Lowrie (1896-1970), Archibald James Lowrie (1898-1898), Flora Lowrie (1900-1902), Hilda Emily Lowrie (1903-1921), Jessie Myrtle Lowrie Cousin (1905-1967), Leslie John Lowrie (1910-1973), and Rachel Vilate Lowrie (1912-1973). Sam Lowrie did not marry and had no children.

Various census rolls showed where he was living and what his occupation was at these times. In 1914 he was living in Karangahake as a miner. In 1915 he was living on Victoria Avenue and working as a miner. In 1919 he was living at 151 Newton Road and working as a miner. In 1928 he was living at 66 Beresford Street and working as a chamber hand. In 1935 he lived at 21 Virginia Avenue in central Auckland and was a labourer. He moved to Rotorua and was living in Ngaputahi as a contractor in 1938. From 1946-49 he was living at 165 Jervois Road and was a steelworker.

== Playing career ==
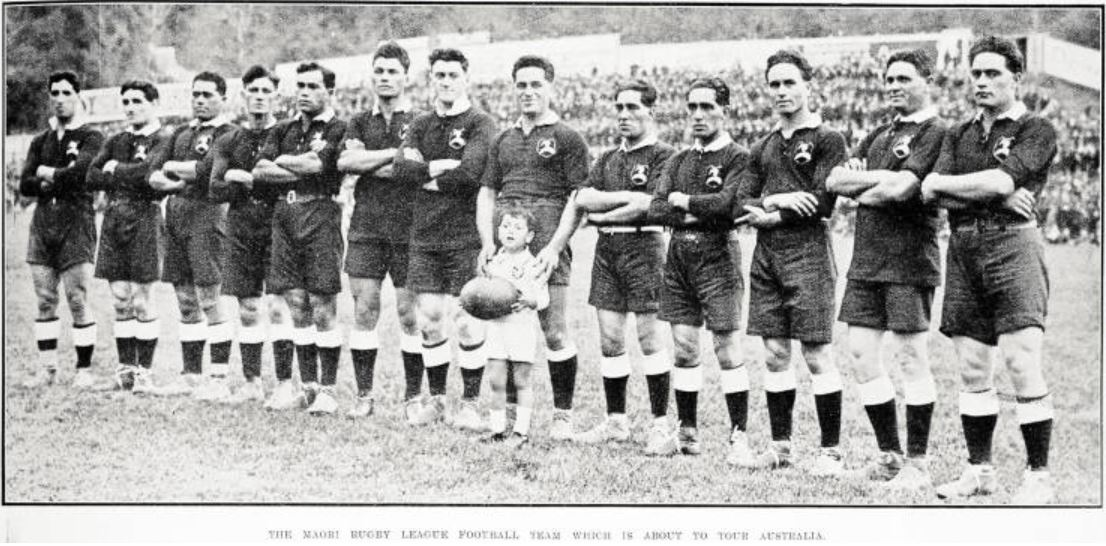
Lowrie, 2nd from the left in the NZ Māori team to play Auckland at Carlaw Park on 20 May 1922.

Lowrie played for the Ponsonby club in the Auckland Rugby League competition.

In 1919 Lowrie played for Auckland and was first selected to represent New Zealand, playing in three test matches against the touring Australian side.

In 1922 Lowrie toured Australia, with the New Zealand Māori rugby league team. He qualified for the Māori side through his grandmother Mere Tipona, who married his grandfather Samuel George Kennedy Lowrie.

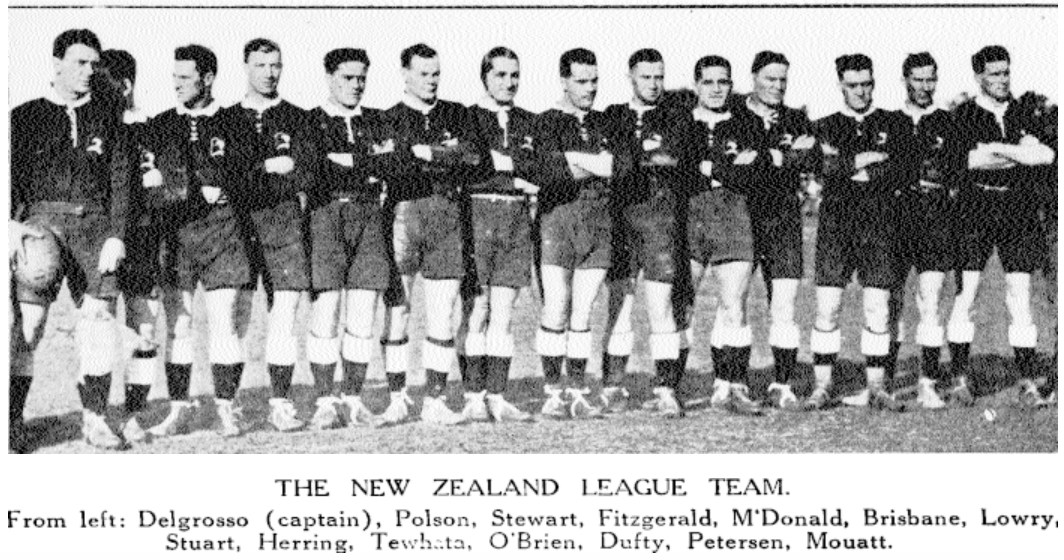

Lowrie was named Ponsonby's best forward in 1923. He again played for New Zealand in 1924, against the touring Great Britain Lions, and toured Australia in 1925, a tour where no test matches were played.

He retired in 1927 after fracturing his jaw. He played in 153 games for Ponsonby between 1914 and 1927.
