= Bert Avery =

NZ international rugby league footballer (1895–1966)

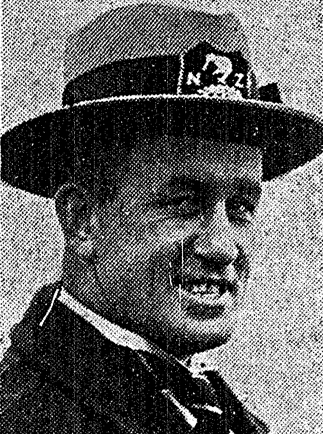

Personal information
- Full name: Herbert William Avery
- Born: 16 June 1896 Whakapirau Pahi, Northland, New Zealand
- Died: 13 April 1966 (aged 70) Auckland, New Zealand

Playing information
- Height: 180 cm (5 ft 11 in)
- Weight: 84 kg (13 st 3 lb)
- Position: Loose forward
Club
Years	Team	Pld	T	G	FG	P
1914–15	City Rovers	15	1	0	0	3
1919–27	Maritime/Grafton Athletic	97	57	1	0	173
	Total	112	58	1	0	176
Representative
Years	Team	Pld	T	G	FG	P
1919–26	Auckland	21	24	0	0	72
1919–27	New Zealand	53	35	0	0	105
1923–25	Auckland Province	3	1	0	0	3
1925–26	North Island	2	1	0	0	3

Coaching information
Representative
Years	Team	Gms	W	D	L	W%
1929	Kingsland Athletic	15	5	1	9	33
- Source: As of 19 April 2021

Herbert "Bert" Avery (1895–1966) was a New Zealand rugby union and professional rugby league footballer who played representative rugby league (RL) for New Zealand.

== Early years ==
Born in 1896 in Whakapirau Northland, Avery originally played rugby union for the local Northland club.

== Playing career ==
Moving to Auckland, Avery switched codes and joined the City Rovers in the Auckland Rugby League competition playing for them in 1914 and 1916. World War I had begun and Avery signed up for the New Zealand forces in 1916 and served in the New Zealand Army until 1918,

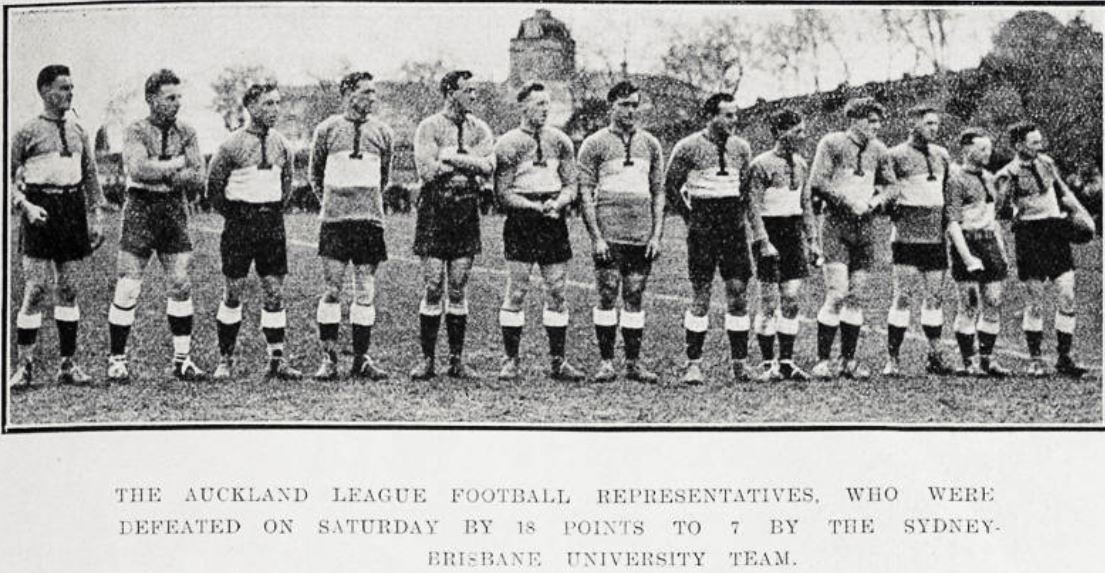
Avery 5th from the left in the Auckland team to play the 2nd match against the Australian Universities side at the Auckland Domain on June 24, 1922.

Following the war he returned to rugby league, playing for the Maritime club who later changed their name to Athletic and then to Grafton Athletic. He was to play at least 97 matches for them and was a prolific try scorer, scoring 57 times.

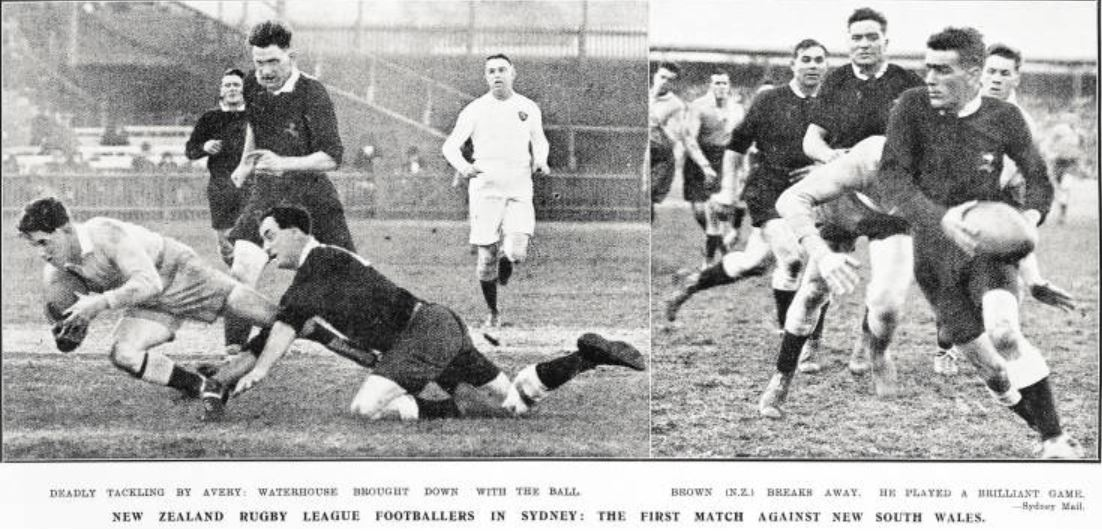
Avery tackling Henry Waterhouse on July 11 at the SCG. NSW won 7-4.

During this time he represented Auckland and was part of the side that held the Northern Union Cup and recorded victories over the touring Great Britain Lions in 1921. In 1923 he had the unusual distinction of playing both for Auckland (against Hamilton), and against Auckland for the Auckland Provincial team in the same season. He again played for both Auckland and Auckland Province in the 1924 season against England.

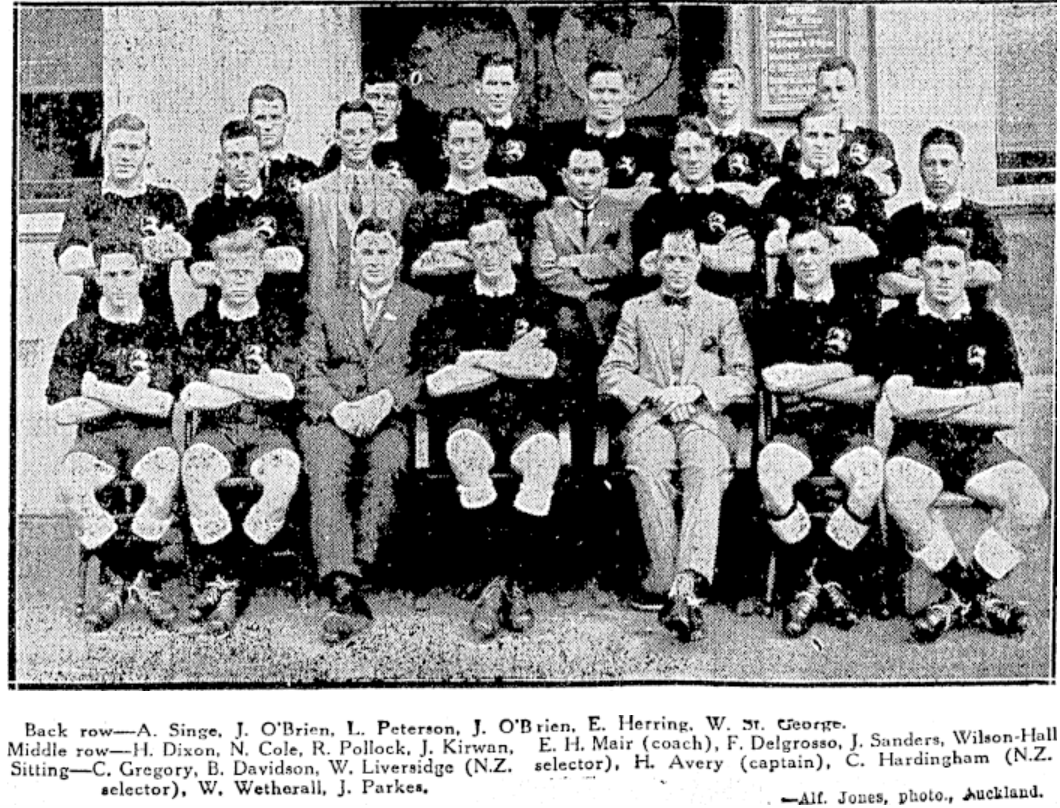

By 1925 he was made captain of the Auckland side. He was also part of the first two inter Island matches, playing for the North Island in 1925 and 1926.

Between 1919 and 1927 Avery played in thirteen test matches for New Zealand including against the 1919 touring Australians and 1920 and 1924 touring Great Britain Lions. He was part of tours of New South Wales and Queensland in 1921 and 1925 where no test matches were played. He captained New Zealand during his final tour, the 1926–1927 tour of Great Britain, which was marred by strike action amongst the forwards. Despite this, he still finished the tour as the leading try scorer with 23 tries in 29 matches.

== Later years ==
Avery retired in 1927. During the season he was concussed attempting a tackle on M Herewini who was trying to hurdle him. He was carried from the field and taken to Auckland Hospital. After being released his brother Henry died in the same week suffering from pneumonia. Bert Avery decided to retire from rugby league at this time. He served as a selector for Auckland between 1928 and 1936. He also coached the Kingsland Athletic senior side in 1929 which was an amalgamation of his Maritime/Grafton Athletic club and Kingsland Rovers. In 1936 he also served as the sole selector of the New Zealand side.

He died in Auckland on 13 April 1966, aged 71.

Avery was one of the first players to be inducted into the New Zealand Rugby League's Legends of League in 1995.
