= Dougie McGregor =

New Zealand dual-code international rugby footballer (1889–1963)

Personal information
- Full name: Alwin John McGregor
- Born: 16 December 1889 Thames, New Zealand
- Died: 15 April 1963 (aged 73) Auckland, New Zealand

Playing information

Rugby union
- Position: Wing
Club
Years	Team	Pld	T	G	FG	P
1908	Karangahake
1909–14	Ponsonby	58	33	0	0	99
	Total	58	33	0	0	99
Representative
Years	Team	Pld	T	G	FG	P
1909–14	Auckland	30	23	0	0	69
1913	New Zealand	11 (2)	16 (1)	0	0	48 (3)

Rugby league
- Position: Wing
Club
Years	Team	Pld	T	G	FG	P
1915–19	Grafton Athletic	38	12	5	0	46
1920–22	Ponsonby United	40	18	26	0	106
	Total	78	30	31	0	152
Representative
Years	Team	Pld	T	G	FG	P
1915–19	Auckland	3	2	0	0	6
1919	New Zealand	9 (2)	5 (2)	0	0	15 (6)
1919	Auckland Province	1	0	0	0	0

Coaching information
Club
Years	Team	Gms	W	D	L	W%
1934–36	Newton Rangers	53	23	2	28	43
1941	Ponsonby United	20	9	2	9	45
	Total	73	32	4	37	44
Representative
Years	Team	Gms	W	D	L	W%
1926	Otago
- Source: Scrum.com
- Relatives: Dick McGregor (uncle)

Alwin John "Dougie" McGregor (16 December 1889 – 15 April 1963) was a dual-code rugby footballer who represented New Zealand in both rugby union and rugby league.

== Rugby union career ==
McGregor played rugby union for the Karangahake club in the Goldfields sub-union competition in 1908. The following year he moved to Auckland, joining the Ponsonby club. McGregor represented Auckland and the North Island that same year.

In 1913 McGregor was picked in the New Zealand squad for their North America tour and played in 11 games during the tour, including Test matches against Australia and the United States.

== Rugby league career ==
In 1915 McGregor switched codes to rugby league, playing in the Auckland Rugby League competition for Grafton Athletic alongside Karl Ifwersen, and McGregors younger brother John Wylie McGregor. He played for them from 1915 to 1919 before switching to the Ponsonby United. He played at both clubs with another brother Eric Esdaile McGregor who was also a very accomplished player and the top try scorer in the Auckland club competition in 1918 along with appearing for Auckland.

Dougie McGregor represented Auckland on 2 occasions. His debut was against Thames in 1915 where he scored a try in a 27–16 win at Victoria Park in front of 4,000 spectators. Auckland played almost no representative fixtures during World War I so his next representative match was against Canterbury in a 45–9 win at the Auckland Domain on 14 September 1918. He played again for Auckland against Hawkes Bay at Eden Park in a 38–13 win where he scored a try. McGregor also played for the Auckland Provincial team against Australia at the Auckland Domain on 20 September. Australia ran out comfortable 32–8 victors. He played in 9 matches for New Zealand. Seven of these were on the 1919 New Zealand tour of Australia and were followed by two test appearance against the Australian side who toured a month later.

== Later years ==
McGregor was later a rugby league coach in Auckland and Otago.

== Family ==
McGregors uncle, Dick, played for the All Blacks between 1901 and 1904 while his nephew, Ron, played for the Kiwis between 1947 and 1948.
