= R.V. Rugby League Football Club =

Defunct NZ rugby league club, based in Auckland

R.V.
Club information
- Full name: R.V. Rugby League Football Club
- Short name: R.V.
- Founded: 1935
- Exited: 1941

Former details
- Ground: Victoria Park
- Competition: Auckland Rugby League

R.V. Rugby League Football Club were a rugby league club in Auckland. They competed from 1935 until 1941. They represented the Alex Harvey & Sons business which had three factories and was mostly based in the inner city area.

== History ==
=== 1935 (Origins) ===
The Harvey and Son's Ltd. building on Victoria Street in 1931.

Harvey and Son's Ltd factory metal printing press

Alex Harvey and Son's Ltd Albert Street Building

The name R.V. was a play on the name ‘Harvey’ from the company Alex Harvey and Sons, also called Alex Harvey Industries. They were manufacturers of sheet metal products including cans, cabinets, washing machine components and many other things. At the time of the R.V. rugby league club formation they had premises on Albert Street, Kings Drive in Parnell, and Victoria Street (Cook Street). They also had a cricket and basketball club and later also formed a football club. The business later changed its name to Alex Harvey Industries, and in 1985 merged with Carter Holt to become Carter Holt Harvey.

==== First rugby league sides ====
The 1935 season saw the R.V. club field a Second grade side in the Auckland Rugby League club competition. They finished the season playing approximately 12 games, winning 6, drawing 2, and losing 3 with a result unknown. They scored 95 points and conceded 87 and finished third of seven. Prior to the start of the season W.H. Fraser and C.J. Purdy were granted transfers to the club. R.V.’s first ever game was against Glenora on May 4, 1935. The match was played at Victoria Park in central Auckland at 3pm with Mr. Jack Hawkes refereeing. There was no result from the match reported. The following Saturday they played Ponsonby United (Ponsonby Ponies) at Victoria Park with Mr. L. Dixon the referee. They lost 13 points to 0. They had their first reported win a week later on May 18 when they travelled to play Manukau at their ground which in this era was in Onehunga. They won the match 19 to 0.

At this point of the season a W. Harvey transferred to the club from Ponsonby. He was most likely a member of the Harvey family who were heavily involved with the club. While C.E. Allen left the club to join Ellerslie United (Ellerslie Eagles). They had another win over Papakura at Western Springs on May 25 by the score of 30 points to 10. R.V. then drew with Mount Albert 7-7. They had a 26–2 loss to Richmond Rovers on June 8. Richmond would go on to win the second grade championship. R.V. then played a house match at Walker Park in Point Chevalier between R.V. 1 and R.V. 2. A 6–6 draw against Glenora followed on June 22.

The Auckland Rugby League received a request from the Tuakau rugby league club based in Tuakau for a team to be sent there to play them. They decided to send the R.V. team on June 29. R.V. lost the match by 20 points to 6. They then had three wins in succession in July over Richmond (9–8), Mount Albert (11–5), and Papakura (11–0). Towards the end of July the R.V. side was supposed to play against Lower Waikato but the game was deferred to August 10. They were representing the sub-league of Auckland. In the meantime R.V. had a default win over Manukau on August 3. They were then soundly beaten by Tuakau 41 to 5 at the Auckland Domain No. 6 field. Their final championship game was played against Ponsonby on August 17 who they were tied with on 14 competition points and sitting in second equal position, six behind Richmond. Ponsonby won 2-0 meaning they finished second and R.V. third.

The knockout competition began and they had a win over Manukau in round one, before beating Māngere United 8–0 in the semi-final at Grey Lynn Park in Grey Lynn on August 31. The final was against Richmond on the Auckland Domain No.2 field at 3pm on September 7 against Richmond Rovers. R.V. were defeated by 13 points to 6 in what was described as “one of the best displays at the Domain this season”.

=== 1936-1939 ===
==== 1936 Second Grade Champions ====
The 1936 season saw the R.V. club win the second grade competition (Hayward Shield). They finished the championship playing nine games and winning eight with just one loss to finish comfortably ahead of Mount Albert United who were six competition points behind them. Their third grade side played in section 2 and won four games, and lost nine to finish in the bottom half of the standings.

R.V. rugby league club 1936 elected officials

The club held their annual meeting on the evening of February 18. The club was heavily populated by members of the Harvey family. The following officers were elected for the season:- chairman, Mr. R. Muller; patron, Mr. A.G. Harvey; vice-presidents, Mr. D. Harvey, sen., Mr. W. Harvey, jun., Mr. A. Harvey, jun., Mr. J. McGehan, Mr. Hamilton, Mr. E. Griffiths; secretary, Mr. F.W. Day; treasurer, Mr. C. Smith; committee (two represent each factory), Victoria Street, R. Parr, E. Knight, Albert Street, A. Cloke, J. Salter, King's Drive, J. Taberner, L. Simpson; selector, trainer, A. Cloke; delegate, Mr. R. Parr; deputy-delegate, Mr. J. Taberner; official linesman, J. Salter; ball custodian.

Prior to the season starting A. Wicks transferred to R.V. from Devonport United (North Shore Albions) and then W. Dale was regraded from their second grade team to their thirds. The second grade side opened the season with a 13–12 win over Mount Albert at Morningside on May 9. They then had an 11–6 win against Richmond Rovers on their Grey Lynn Park ground before suffering their only defeat of the championship. It came against Glenora on May 23 by 13 points to 5. At this stage of the season F.H. Cullum was regraded from their second grade side to their thirds and then on May 30 they had a default win over Manukau. A. Ellis from the Ponsonby club transferred to the R.V. second grade side while A. Griffiths joined their third grade team from the City Rovers club.

Their third grade side challenged the weight of the entire Ellerslie United side however 12 of them were found to be under the weight limit and assured the league that the 13th was too. Four of the players were so under weight that the league gave them 1 shilling each for travelling expenses out of the 35 shilling protest fee paid by the R.V. club. The second grade team in the meantime had wins over Richmond, 13 to 2 on June 13, and then over Mount Albert and Richmond again before another win over Mount Albert by 13 to 0 on July 4.

The third grade side applied to the Junior Board for money for their visit to Whangarei for travel expenses however the application was referred to the ARL with “an unfavourable recommendation”. They lost the match, played on July 25 by 10 points to 0 against the Northland junior representative side. The R.V. club reported back to the league that their opponents were stronger and heavier and that they were “impressed by the standard of play witnessed, and were hospitably entertained”.

At the management meeting of the ARL junior management committee on August 25 the R.V. club was congratulated on winning the second grade championship with Mr. D. Wilkie presiding. The R.V. third grade side was granted permission to play the City juniors from Whangarei on September 12 provided a ground was available. They won the match 21 points to 15. The second grade side was now playing in the knockout competition but lost to Mount Albert 18–8 at Victoria Park on August 29. This was the end of their season.

The R.V. club also had a cricket club which played in the summer. In the team was Charles Finlayson who had played rugby league and cricket for New Zealand. His son, Kenneth Finlayson played rugby league for Otahuhu Rovers, and Manukau.

==== 1937 Senior B & Third Grade ====
R.V. annual meeting advertisement for their rugby league club

The 1937 season saw R.V. field a side in the Senior B (Sharman Cup) grade, effectively being their 2nd grade side moving up a grade. They also fielded a 3rd grade side which effectively replaced the 2nd grade which was no longer run. The Senior B side performed creditably winning eight of their 12 matches, scoring 113 points and conceding 50, finishing fourth of the nine sides in the championship. The 3rd grade team won three of their eleven matches to finish fifth of seven in section 1.

The club held their annual meeting on Monday, March 1 at 7:30pm at the Victoria Cruising Club Rooms in Freemans Bay. The club was located at Westhaven. The Victoria Cruising Club had in fact had a rugby league team in the 1923 season but ceased beyond this year. The meeting saw the following officers elected:- chairman, Mr. E. Muller; patron, Mr. A.G. Harvey; vice-presidents, Messrs. D. Harvey, W. Harvey, sen., W. Harvey, jun., A. Harvey, jun. C. Hamilton, J. McGeehan, E. Griffiths, W. Rabbidge, C. Smith, R. Parr, A. Cloke; secretary, Mr. G. Dines; treasurer, Mr. F.W. Day; selector coaches, Mr. T. Shearer (Senior B), and Mr. E. Knight (third grade); committee to represent each factory, Messrs. R. Parr and E. Knight (Victoria Street), Messrs. T. Shearer and J. Salter (Albert Street), Messrs. W. Halverson and A. Brown (King's Drive); delegate, Mr. R. Parr; deputy delegate, Mr. G. Dines; official linesman, Messrs. J. Salter (Senior B), and W. Halverson (third grade).

The Senior B sides first match was a practice game against Mount Albert United Senior B at Fowlds Park in Morningside on April 17. Their first competition game was against Papakura on May 11 at Prince Edward Park in Papakura with T. Tracy refereeing.

R.V. rugby league clubs first ever published team lists in 1937

For the first time in the clubs brief history their team lists were published in the newspapers. The Senior B side was A. Hoverd, R. Harvey, Bowater, C. Purdy, L. Verrall, C. Maher, J. Anderson, E. Phillips, Collins, Daniels, T. Maher, C. Mills with the team meeting to catch a bus to Papakura from Grafton Bridge at 1:45 for the 3pm kick off. R.V. lost a close match by 15 points to 11. The third grade team for their opening match of the season was C. Bosley, A. Bidwell, B. Bidwell, M. Hogwood, P. Simpson, C. Thomas, J. Reo, G. Dines, Simpson, Gussy, Langabeer, Christopher, R. Price, Jamieson, and Shearer. During the season their captain was suspended until he appeared due to knowingly signing the team list sheet when an unregistered player was on it. The match was against Ellerslie. The coach of the side, Mr. E. Knight apologised and explained that “as the team was short and the match was regarded as a “Scratch” one, he thought there was no harm permitting the player mentioned to take the field”.

The club gained some players from other clubs including G. Dynes from the Richmond third grade side, and then P. Awhitu and P. Kauhoa from City, and F. Deason from the Ponsonby reserve grade side. All four players were named to make their respective debuts for the Senior B and third grade sides the following weekend on May 8.

The R.V. Senior B team lost to Green Lane 12–8 on May 8 before registering their first win on May 15 when they defeated Newton Rangers at Western Springs by 20 to 0. They had further wins over Point Chevalier, Northcote & Birkenhead Ramblers, and then Mount Albert by 29 to 2 on June 12 at Walker Park in Point Chevalier. Another big win followed against Richmond on June 19 with a 43–0 victory. The side won against Manukau on July 3 before a bye on the weekend of July 10.

R.V. rugby league club social event in 1937

That same weekend the club held a social dance at the New Savoy Cabaret.

On the 13th of July the One Tree Point club in Northland applied for permission to play a game in Auckland and were referred by the Auckland Rugby League to the R.V. Club. And then a match was lined up against the R.V. third grade team which had toured Whangārei the previous season. The same meeting saw R.S. Pyke transfer from the Papakura Senior B team to R.V., and F.N. Snilgar transfer from the Ponsonby fourths to the R.V. thirds. The Senior B side lost to Papakura 6–2 on July 17 before wins over Green Lane and Mount Albert the following weekends. In the meantime their third grade side played against the touring One Tree Point side at the Auckland Domain No. 2 on August 7 at 1pm. The One Tree Point side were the champion junior side in Northland. The R.V. side for the match was Waller, Hogwood, R. Purdy, Allen, Verrall, Wicks, Bidwell, Inglis, Bailey, Malam, Gussey, Simpson, Eva, T. Maher, Hedland, and Jamieson. The visiting side beat R.V. by 5 points to 3 and after the game the R.V. club “intimated that they are desirous of sending two teams to this district [Whangarei]”.

The R.V. Senior B team lost to Point Chevalier 15–0 on August 14 and then there were three unreported results against Richmond, Newton, and Northcote with the championship coming to an end. In the meantime Leonard Verrall transferred from their side to Mount Albert. He would go on to play 13 games for their senior, Fox Memorial side from 1937 to 1944. Their season came to a conclusion on September 18 when they were well beaten by Point Chevalier 42–2 at the Glen Eden Recreation Reserve ground in Glen Eden in the second round of the Walmsley Shield knockout competition.

==== 1938 (3 Teams) ====
The R.V. club increased their playing numbers for the 1938 season and fielded three teams in the Senior B, third grade, and fourth grade competitions. The Senior B side struggled winning just one of their 12 matches. The lower grade sides fared better with the third grade team winning six and losing three of their known results to finish second of seven, while the new the fourth grade side won five, drew two, and lost six to finish fifth of 11 in their championship.

At the start of the season L. Keen, Herbert Muller, and D. Hargreaves transferred to R.V. fourth grade from the Richmond fifth grade side. While C. Maher and D. Reason were regraded from the Senior B side down to the third grade side. Then G. Banks joined their Senior B side from Newton. The Senior B side to start the season was Malam, Collins, D. Reason, Ellis (2), Kirk, K. Roberts, Roberts, Putland, P. Awhitu, Kipa, Mills, Dare, Pine, G. Banks, Waller, Leslie James Kenneth Wicham, S.G. Clark, Nathan, Diamond, Sutherland, Morris, and Harris. They lost their first game, 13–0 to Green Lane at Green Lane on April 30. The same weekend their third grade team was Waller, Allen, Bidwell, Whyte, Walker, Simpson, C. Maher, Gussey, Johnson, Blair, Collis, A. Jamieson, E. Beguely, Rapheal, Snelgar, and M. Tryson. While the fourth grade team was Howe, Hart, Bidwell, Adams, Rae, Hardgrave, Hunt, Martin, Beekly, Muller, Keene, Manoch, O’Donnell, Lyons, M. Keen, Howe, Desmond Arthur Quelch, L. Wallbank, Taylor, Manoah, Keane (2), and Cairns. The club had E. Beguely, L. Wallbank, and S.G. Clark join their third, fourth, and third grade sides respectively from the Richmond and Newton clubs. Then K. Roberts joined the Senior B side from Mount Albert, Leslie James Wickham joined the same side from Glenora, and Desmond Arthur Quelch joined their fourth grade team from Ponsonby.

Richmond opening of their new clubrooms at Grey Lynn Park in 1938

On May 31 the R.V. Senior B team asked to be able to travel to play Huntly Marist in Huntly when they had a bye on June 4. The same weekend a Huntly senior side was playing Richmond Rovers to celebrate the opening of their new clubrooms at Grey Lynn Park with R.V.’s third grade side playing Richmond as a curtain-raiser.

On August 9 the R.V. club protested the weights of the Otahuhu Rovers fourth grade side for the second time in the year. The protest was dismissed and the protest fee impounded and Otahuhu were allowed travel expenses as they had to travel to headquarters to be weighed. Then in early September the Senior B and fourth grade teams were granted permission to travel to Hikurangi in Northland on September 10. The Northern Advocate newspaper wrote after the visit “league supporters at Hikurangi had a football feast last week-end, when the "R.V.'s" from Auckland paid the local club a visit. Two teams=a fourth grade and a senior-made the trip. Hikurangi seniors were pitted against the visitors and succeeded in securing a substantial win, whilst the fourth-graders fought a hard battle with a combined Hikurangi junior team. This resulted in a 5–5 draw. The touring party, which consisted of 36 members, arrived by special bus at 6 o’clock on Saturday morning, under the managership of Mr. W. Hanlon. On Saturday night the visitors were entertained at an impromptu smoke concert prior to being guests at the pictures and dance held in the Criterion Theatre. The "R.V.'s" left for home at 2:30 p.m. on Sunday”.

==== 1939 (Senior B, Third & Fourth Grades) ====
In 1939 R.V. once again fielded sides in the Senior B, Third, and Fourth Grades. The Senior B team had only one reported victory and six losses, though several other games did not have results reported in the newspapers and they finished fifth of six in the championship. They struggled through the Walmesly Shield and defaulted two games. Their third grade side was the best performing of their three teams. They had ten results reported and won seven and drew two of these and finished narrowly behind Richmond in second place in section 2. The fourth grade team struggled losing all of their reported games and then withdrawing from the competition around the halfway mark of the season. A month prior they had played two players out of order and the points for the match were awarded to their opponents, Northcote. The club held their annual meeting at the YMCA Rooms on Tuesday night, February 28. It was reported that “there was a good muster of players, including a number of new members”. The elected officers were:- Patron, Mr. A.G. Harvey, chairman and president, Mr. W. Halverston, sen., Alex Harvey, W. Harvey jun,. R. Harvey, D. Harvey, Alex Harvey jun., F. Martin, W. Best, G. Martin, G. Taberner, A. Couper, W. Gussey, G. McGehan, R. Simpson, C. Hamilton, E. Griffiths, C. Smith, A. Cloke, secretary, R. McMilne, treasurer, W. Hamlen, committee, F. Deason, McLean, T. Adams, E. Knight, C. Lyons, T. Vercoe, club captain E. Muller, delegate, K. McMilne, coaches, W. Hamlen, L. Barchard, and Heron. There was a vote of thanks by the players and committee to Mr. E. Muller, chairman, and Mr. G. Dines, secretary for their services during the past two years, and regret expressed at their resignations. They also made a presentation to Mrs Dines for her “valuable assistance to the committee”.

On March 28 the club advertised for their opening practice of the season at Victoria Park. Prior to the start of the season Peter Awhitu and P. Kauhoa transferred from the R.V. Senior B side to the Manukau club. Awhitu would go on to play 27 games for the Manukau seniors from 1939 to 1943. While Kauhoa also played a handful of games for their senior side from 1939 to 1941.

The R.V. Senior B sides only known victory came in round 2 when they played Green Lane at Victoria Park on May 6. The match was refereed by former New Zealand representative Ted Mincham with R.V. winning 12–10. J. Couper transferred to the R.V. Senior B team from the Ponsonby reserve grade side. The teams for their three sides May 13 games were published in the Auckland Star. The Senior B side named to play Northcote & Birkenhead Ramblers at Stafford Park, Northcote was Ellis (2), Malam, Zimmerman, Walker, Roberts, Harris, F Deason, Lowther, Rapana, Reo, G. Dines, Eddy, Kipa, Banks, and Keane. The third grade team to play City Rovers B at Victoria Park No. 5 was E. Beguely, Clarke, Lambert, Waller, Tryson, Bull, Thomas, Gussey, Jamieson, Snedgar, Compton, Howe, Blair, Collis, and Thew. While the fourth grade side to play Mount Albert at Fowld's Park in Morningside was Rae, Keane (2), Wallbank, Hargraves, Hogan, Hunt, O’Donnell, Muller, Bedvell, Blackburn, O’Brien, Elder, and Mannoah. The R.V. Senior B side had losses during the season of 19–2 to Ellerslie United, 11–6 to Point Chevalier, 8–0 to Otahuhu Rovers, 7–3 to Northcote, 24–0 to Ellerslie, and 8–2 to Point Chevalier through June, July, and August. They then defaulted to Otahuhu in the Walmesly Shield competition before games against Green Lane and Northcote and then another default loss to Ellerslie on August 12. That saw them then withdraw from the final round “owing to illness and injuries among its players”.

==== 1940 3rd Grade and Schoolboy Teams ====
R.V. annual meeting for 1940.

The 1940 season saw R.V. begin to struggle for senior numbers like many sides due to the war effort. Their Senior B team withdrew from the competition after the first round when they were supposed to play Northcote at Victoria Park. They fielded a third grade side, and for the first time entered two schoolboy teams in the Intermediate and Junior grades. The Third grade side had nine fixtures with only seven results reported which were all losses. Two of them were default losses and they withdrew from the competition at the midway point of the season. The Intermediate schoolboy side made the championship final in Section B but lost to Marist 5–3. This meant both teams became level on points and they were both bracketed as championship winners. The Junior schoolboys side only had five fixtures reported and one result which was a 3–0 win so it is unknown where they finished in the standings.

The R.V. club held their annual meeting on Monday, March 11 at 8pm in their clubrooms at 152 Fanshawe Street. The location is opposite Victoria Park and the current day location of Grant Thornton House. Their honorary secretary placing the notice for the meeting was F. Deason. In late April L. Wallbank was granted a transfer from R.V. to Richmond. The Senior B side was supposed to play Northcote in round one and then withdrew. While the Third grade side suffered a 58–0 defeat to City Rovers on May 11. With their Senior B side dropping out of the competition their players were able to transfer to other clubs. Frank Zimmerman moved to Newton Rangers. He went on to play 47 senior Fox Memorial games for Newton from 1940 to at least 1945 and also three games for Mount Albert in 1942. Just after his senior debut the Auckland Star wrote “a newcomer to the senior ranks of the league code is F. Zimmerman, who played his second game in the Newton senior forwards. He is of sturdy build and already shows much promise. Zimmerman, while still very young, first played league in the senior B grade for R.V. for one season. He hails from Whangaroa, but has spent most of his young life in Auckland”. A short piece was written about T. Maher who was now the City Rovers senior reserve fullback. He had played for the R.V. senior B side for a season also but had returned to his former City club. Coincidentally the senior grade fullback for City was Warwick Clarke. Clarke in the summer months played for the R.V. cricket club and went on to become a prolific point scorer for the New Zealand rugby league team. In September the R.V. Intermediate schoolboy team was supposed to travel to New Plymouth as part of a visit by representative teams which saw South Auckland also sending a senior and junior representative sides to play local teams. However they were unable to travel.

==== 1941 (3 x Schoolboys) ====
In 1941 R.V. only fielded teams in the schoolboy competition with one in each of the senior, intermediate, and junior grades. There were very few results reported in any of the grades. Their senior schoolboys had a win and a loss reported with their win against Point Chevalier 13 to 7. On June 2 games were played to celebrate the King's Birthday. The R.V. schoolboys played Mount Albert as one of the curtain-raisers to the South Auckland (Waikato) v Auckland Māori game.

In early October two R.V. schoolboys players were selected to play against South Auckland schoolboys for the Golden Bloom Banner. They were J. Takiru and P. Martin. Their senior schoolboy side made the final of the knockout competition against Point Chevalier. R.V. lost by 3 points to 0 on October 25. Their Intermediate grade side beat Ponsonby by default, and beat Ellerslie 60–0. Other results reported for them were a 13–4 loss to Newton on July 26. And then the beat Ponsonby 34–0 on August 14. They were obviously having a good season as they had four players named in the starting side for the Auckland Intermediate schoolboys representative side with their being 11 sides to choose from. They were to play a match against South Auckland (Waikato) in Huntly on September 6. They were Tawhau, Chin, Townsend, and Ellis. The South Auckland schoolboys side won the match in wet conditions by 17 points to 3. On September 20 R.V.’s intermediate team had another result reported which was a 3-0 win against Mount Albert who were one of the stronger teams. Their Junior grade side had four results reported, all losses, including 0-24 to Green Lane on June 21, and 0-5 to Point Chevalier.

==== End of the R.V. rugby league club ====
In 1942 there was no mention of any particular R.V. sides in the Auckland competition at all. There was however an injury reported to Patrick Walter Stepanicic who was concussed in a July 11 match against Point Chevalier. He was 15 years of age and taken to Auckland Hospital but his condition was “not serious”.

There was no mention of the R.V. club again beyond this point. They did however continue to field a football (soccer) club, and cricket club for several seasons beyond this. They retained some links for rugby league however with Horace Hunt turning out for their senior cricket side as wicket keeper in the Auckland suburban competition. Hunt had been the Auckland wicketkeeper in the early 1930s and played over 150 games for the North Shore senior side from 1931 to 1945. He made his one and only appearance for the Auckland side in 1943. The R.V. senior criekct side won the senior grade championship in 1945.

=== Team records ===
==== Most senior team ====
The season record for the most senior team in the club.

Year	Grade	Club Name	Pld	W	D	L	PF	PA	PD	Pts	Position (Teams)
1935	2nd Grade (Hayward Shield)	R.V.	12	6	2	3	95	87	+8	14	3rd of 7
1936	2nd Grade (Hayward Shield)	R.V.	9	8	0	1	61	41	+20	16	1st of 5 winners of Hayward Shield, lost knockout competition (Monteith Shield) 18–8 to Mount Albert.
1937	Senior B (Sharman Cup)	R.V.	12	8	0	4	113	113	0	6	4th of 9
1938	Senior B (Sharman Cup)	R.V.	12	1	0	11	34	122	-88	2	6th of 6
1939	Senior B (Sharman Cup)	R.V.	7	1	0	6	27	95	-68	2	5th of 6
1940	3rd Grade (Walker Cup)	R.V.	9	0	0	7	3	166	-163	0	11th of 11
1941	Senior Schoolboys (Lou Rout Trophy)	R.V.	2	1	0	1	17	20	-3	2	4th of 9
1942	Senior Schoolboys (Lou Rout Trophy)	R.V.	-	-	-	-	-	-	-	-	Unknown, no results reported
1935-42	TOTAL	-	73	25	2	33	350	644	-294	42	
