= 1923 Auckland Rugby League season =

The 1923 season of the Auckland Rugby League was its 15th. The First Grade competition featured 7 teams with the Fire Brigade club who featured in it in 1922 not entering a team.

Preceded by 1922	15th Auckland Rugby League season 1923	Succeeded by 1924

== Club teams by grade participation ==
Team	1st Grade	2nd Grade	3rd Grade	4th Grade	5th Grade	6th Grade A	6th Grade B	Total
City Rovers	1	1	1	1	1	1	1	7
Marist Old Boys	1	1	1	1	1	1	1	7
Ponsonby United	1	1	1	1	0	1	1	6
Richmond Rovers	1	0	1	0	1	2	1	6
Devonport United	1	1	1	1	0	1	0	5
Newton Rangers	1	1	1	1	1	0	0	5
Athletic	1	1	0	1	0	1	1	5
Ellerslie United	0	1	1	1	0	0	1	4
Manukau Rovers	0	0	1	0	1	1	1	4
Parnell	0	0	1	1	0	1	1	4
Kingsland Rovers	0	1	1	1	0	0	0	3
Otahuhu Rovers	0	1	0	1	0	1	0	3
Ihumātao	0	1	1	0	0	0	0	2
Māngere Rangers	0	1	0	1	0	0	0	2
Northcote & Birkenhead Ramblers	0	1	0	0	1	0	0	2
Point Chevalier	0	0	1	0	1	0	0	2
Coromandel Old Boys	0	0	1	0	0	0	0	1
Victoria Cruising Club	0	0	1	0	0	0	0	1
Takapuna	0	0	0	0	1	0	0	1
Manukau Cruising Club	0	0	0	0	0	0	1	1
Total	7	12	14	11	8	10	9	71

== Auckland Rugby League news ==
=== First grade winners ===
City Rovers won their 6th championship title and the 3rd in succession after defeating Athletic 8–7 in the final. With a round to play City was only 2 competition points ahead of Athletic so it was decided to play a final to decide the champions. The match was played on Carlaw Park in front of an enormous crowd of 11,500 with £325 received in gate takings. City were the second team to win three consecutive titles after Ponsonby United had won the competition in 1917, 1918, and 1919. It was to be 61 years until it happened again with Mt Albert winning the title from 1984 to 1986 before Northcote won 4 titles from 1991 to 1994, Glenora 3 titles from 1997 to 1999, and Pt Chevalier won 3 titles from 2013 to 2015.

Ponsonby won the Roope Rooster Knockout competition for the second straight year and their third time in the competition's history after defeating City Rovers 14–3 in the final.

=== Representative team ===
The Auckland representative team played 5 matches for 4 wins and a 20–20 draw. The draw was arguably the most significant result as it was in a match for the Northern Union Challenge Cup against South Auckland. Auckland had lost the cup to the same opposition the previous season and as the match was drawn South Auckland retained it. The two teams met again at the end of the season at Carlaw Park which Auckland won convincingly however the cup was not being played for as it was only defended at the holders home ground.

=== Boating tragedy ===
On April 1, 1923 Bill Walsh, the New Zealand and Ponsonby player was involved in a serious boating accident on the Tairua Bar which claimed the lives of 4 people. He was one of seven onboard the launch, Lorraine when it capsized shortly before 9pm on the Tairua Bar. The boat had attended a regatta at Whitianga when it was returning. There was a strong wind and heavy seas at the time. The deceased were William (Bill) Southernwood (a Ponsonby teammate), H Chappell, T Culhane, and N Robson all of Auckland. When the launch capsized Walsh and T Jenkins were trying to retrieve the dinghy when Walsh got his feet tangled in fishing line. Three breaking waves then struck them smashing the boat into "matchwood". One of the survivors, Silston Cory-Wright had managed to secure a benzine tin to hold on to in the water. Walsh was described as being "nearly done for" but was saved by Cory-Wright who had also cleared Walsh's feet of fishing line from which he had become entangled and reached him with the benzine tin. Cory-Wright then managed to put a life belt over Walsh's shoulders and kept him afloat until they could be pulled onboard. Both men were described as being "in a pretty bad way". Prime Minister William Massey telegraphed to Tairua his sincere sympathy from himself and his wife for the bereaved relatives. Walsh recovered sufficiently and was able to assume the position of club captain which he had been elected to for the 1923 season.

=== Manukau rugby league team ===
Near the end of the season the Manukau and Māngere clubs sent a letter to the Auckland Rugby League which was read at the management committee meeting on 29 August. It stated that the two clubs had decided to amalgamate and would enter a team in the senior grade the following year provided permission was granted, which it was. The Manukau club is the Manukau club of today, though the Mangere club is not related to the modern day Mangere East who were not founded until 1963. The Manukau club were located in their early decades in the Onehunga area before moving much later to their current location at Moyle Park. The clubs did however remain separate and compete as separate entities the following year. Māngere were previously known as Māngere Rangers however and became known as Māngere United until they ceased to exist at the end of 1934. In the same 1923 season the Manukau Cruising Club decided to enter a team in the 6th B Grade. They played 9 games before withdrawing from the competition despite being relatively competitive. In one of their matches Roy Hardgrave and Ted Brimble played for them when their Manukau teams had a bye.

=== Monteith Shield (1st grade championship) ===
The 1923 First Grade Championship was arguably the most keenly fought in the competition's history to this point with three teams in the hunt for the title up until the last two weeks. Marist Old Boys who were in a good position to win the title lost in the 12th and 13th rounds and bowed out of contention, leaving City Rovers and Athletics to contend. It was ultimately won by City Rovers who finished the season with a 10 win and 2 loss record, as did Athletic, with a final being required to determine the winner. City won by the narrowest of margins 8–7 to go back to back.

=== Monteith Shield standings ===
Team	Pld	W	D	L	F	A	Pts
City Rovers	13	11	0	2	228	72	22
Athletic	13	10	0	3	180	87	20
Marist Old Boys	12	9	0	2	170	108	18
Devonport United	12	6	0	6	135	141	12
Ponsonby United	12	4	0	8	118	179	8
Newton Rangers	12	2	0	10	85	183	4
Richmond Rovers	12	1	0	11	93	239	2

A final was played between City Rovers and Athletic after the round robin to decide the title with City winning 8 points to 7 in front of 11,500 spectators at Carlaw Park.

=== Monteith Shield fixtures ===
The First Grade season was particularly close right until the end. In the final round the step was made to play both games on Carlaw Park number 1 field for the first time (usually one match was always played on the number 2 field at the same time). If Athletic had defeated City Rovers in the main match they would have won the championship for the first time however they lost to City which forced a final to be played the following week between the same two teams and City were again victorious to claim their 3rd straight championship.

==== Round 1 ====
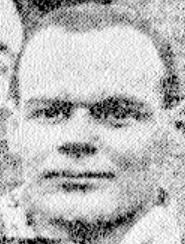
Hec Brisbane

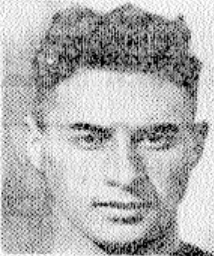
Wilson Hall

Round 1 saw the debut of centre Hec Brisbane for Marist against Richmond. Brisbane would go on to play 158 games for Marist from 1923 to 1934 scoring 71 tries, mostly in the centre position. He also played for Auckland 14 times from 1923 to 1933 and a remarkable 50 matches for New Zealand from 1924 to 1932. He was also a representative selector in the 1930s after he retired. Scrum half, Wilson Hall also debuted for Athletic after joining from the Ngaruawahia club. He would go on to transfer to Hornby in Canterbury before being signed by Hull F.C. in 1928. He later played for Castleford and Dewsbury, as well as representing New Zealand on the 1926-27 tour of England.

5 May	Ponsonby	15–10	Newton	Carlaw Park 1
3:00	Try: W Henderson, Frank Delgrosso, Wilfred McNeil; Con: Frank Delgrosso 2 Pen: Frank Delgrosso		Try: Clarrie Polson, Dick Stack; Con: Clarrie Polson; Drop: Lou Brown	Attendance: 5000; Referee: Bert Gallagher

5 May	Marist	23–15	Richmond	Carlaw Park 2
3:00	Try: Billy Ghent, Baden Foss, Stevens, Percy Gallagher, Courtney; Con: Billy Ghent 2, Nelson Bass; Pen: Billy Ghent		Try: McKenzie (obstruction try), Kettlewell, Unknown x 1 Con: Butler 2 Drop: McKenzie	Attendance: 5000; Referee: William Mincham

5 May	Devonport	0–12	Athletic	Devonport Domain
3:00			Try: Nicholson, W Miller, Bert Avery, Craddock Dufty	Referee: Les Bull

==== Round 2 ====
Kettlewell, the Richmond five eighth fractured his left collarbone and was taken to hospital in their 37-8 loss to Athletic. For the winners Craddock Dufty scored 4 tries and kicked two conversions. Those two conversions were the only successful attempts from their 11 tries with Bert Avery, George Yardley, and Redmond Lonergan all scoring twice.

12 May	Marist	11–5	Newton	Carlaw Park 1
3:00	Try: Stevens, Sid McNamara, Billy Ghent; Con: Bill Stormont		Try: Wally Somers; Con: Clarrie Polson	Attendance: 7500; Referee: Les Bull

12 May	Athletic	37–8	Richmond	Carlaw Park 2
3:00	Try: Nicholson, George Yardley 2, Redmond Lonergan 2, Craddock Dufty 4, Bert Avery 2 Con: Craddock Dufty 2		Try: McKenzie, J McLean; Con: McKenzie	Attendance: 7500; Referee: Len Farrant

12 May	Devonport	10–24	City	Devonport Domain
3:00	Try: Matthew Scott, Stan Webb; Con: Stan Webb 2		Try: Vic Thomas, Ben Davidson, Mike Flynn, George Cargill, 'Chook' Mitchell, Harry Hawkes; Con: Mike Flynn 3	Referee: William Mincham

==== Round 3 ====
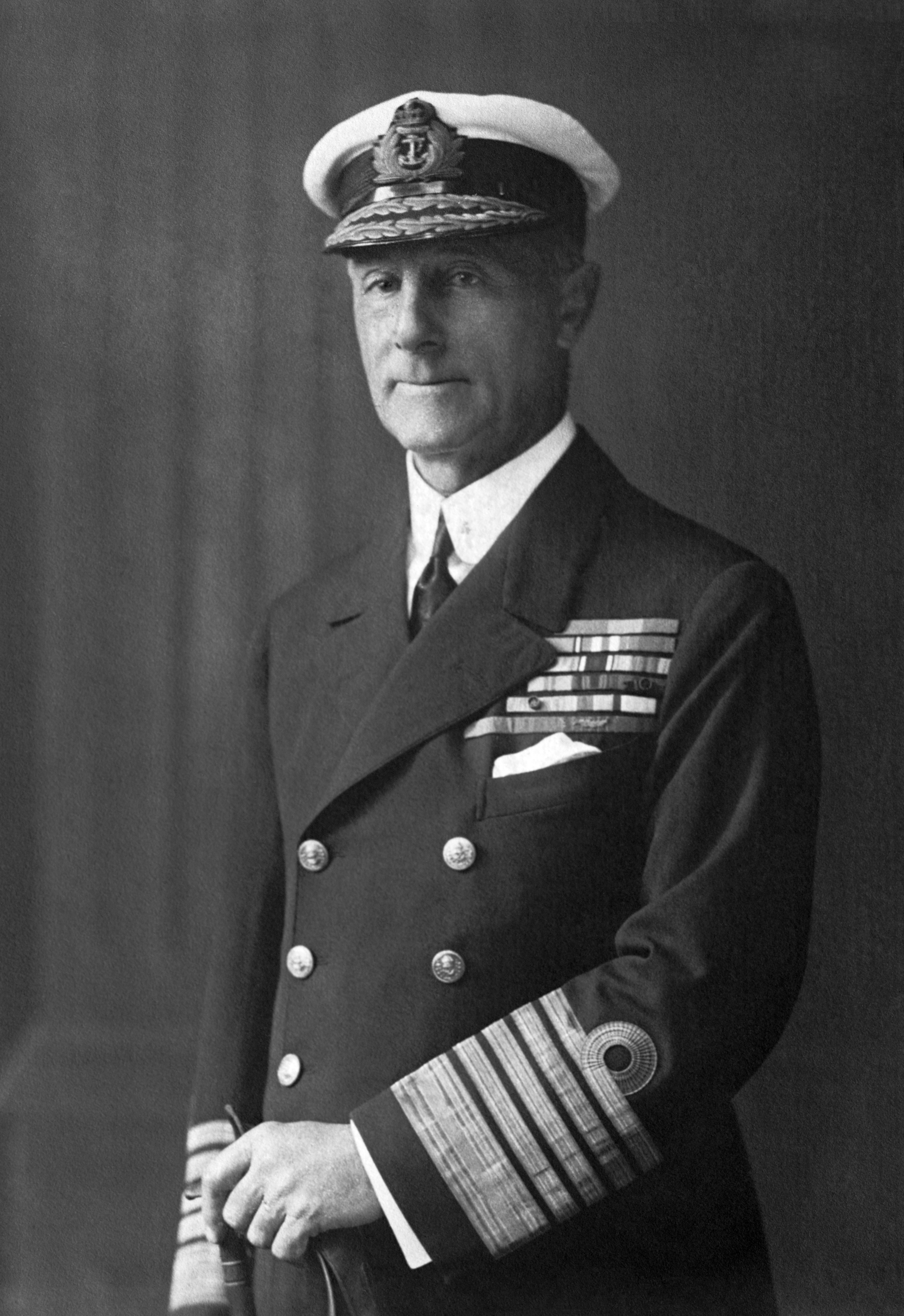
Lord Jellicoe, the Governor General of New Zealand who attended the City v Richmond game at the Auckland Domain.

The Carlaw Park matches drew a large crowd of over 8,000. Athletic had the misfortune to lose their winger Redmond Lonergan to an eye injury in the first minute of their match but nonetheless went on to win 16-15. Wilson Hall played a fine game at five eighth for Athletic and scored a try while captain Bert Avery and Ernie Herring also crossed for tries. Clarrie Polson scored a try for Newton which he converted, also converting both of their other tries. In Marist's 24-9 win over Ponsonby, Bill Stormont scored a try and kicked three penalties. While for Ponsonby Frank Delgrosso in his fifth season of rugby league kicked three goals. At the Auckland Domain Lord Jellicoe, the Governor General of New Zealand, was in attendance to see City beat Richmond 25-9. The Davidson brothers (Bill, Ben, and George) accounted for 17 of City's points. McDonald scored all of Richmond's with a try, conversion, and two penalties.

26 May	Marist	24–9	Ponsonby	Carlaw Park 1
3:00	Try: Jock Johnson, Bill Stormont, Sid McNamara, Stevens; Con: Billy Ghent 2, Percy Gallagher; Pen: Bill Stormont 3		Try: William Hanlon; Con: Frank Delgrosso; Pen: Frank Delgrosso 2	Attendance: 8500; Referee: Billy Murray

26 May	Athletic	16–15	Newton	Carlaw Park 2
3:00	Try: George Yardley, Ernie Herring, Nicholson, Bert Avery; Con: George Yardley, Wilson Hall		Try: Ralph Brockliss, Clarrie Polson, Alfred James; Con: Clarrie Polson 3	Attendance: 8500; Referee: A Saunders

26 May	City	25–9	Richmond	Auckland Domain 2
3:00	Try: Harry Hawkes, Ben Davidson 3, 'Chook' Mitchell, George Davidson 2 Con: Bill Davidson, Mike Flynn		Try: McDonald; Con: McDonald; Pen: McDonald 2	Referee: Albert Vause

==== Round 4 ====
The weekend of rugby league was marred by the tragic death of 15 year old Orville Fisher. He had played for the City B sixth grade teams in their game at Ellerslie and was traveling back to the Auckland station by train afterwards. As the train came past Carlaw Park he and some other boys were standing on the platform of the train which was crowded at the time. Fisher "climbed up the stanchions, and got right up on the roof of the carriage". The boys then "cheered the players on the ground" as the train went by and then they noticed that Fisher had fallen from the train. He had struck his head on one of the Parnell Bridge girders and been killed instantly. The accident was "noticed from Carlaw Park, and a crowd rushed over to the scene". The crowd at Carlaw Park had been a fairly small 3,000 as many sports fans had gone to the Ellerslie Racecourse for the races there.

2 June	City	25–2	Newton	Carlaw Park 1
3:00	Try: Jack Keenan, George Davidson 2, Harry Hawkes, Maurice Wetherill, Ben Davidson 2 Con: Maurice Wetherill 2		Pen: Clarrie Polson	Attendance: 3000; Referee: Bert Gallagher

2 June	Athletic	20–5 (5-3)	Ponsonby	Carlaw Park 2
3:00	Try: Nicholson, L Lee, Bert Avery, Ernie Herring; Con: Craddock Dufty 4		Try: A McClure; Pen: Frank Delgrosso	Attendance: 3000; Referee: William Mincham

2 June	Devonport	12–3	Richmond	Devonport Domain
3:00	Try: Bert Laing, Jim O'Brien, (E or J) Johnson, Matthew Scott		Try: Hunter	Referee: Les Bull

==== Round 5 ====
John Lang made his first appearance of the season for Marist and played at halfback, forcing Billy Ghent out on to the wing. Marist still went down 9-0 in wet, muddy conditions at Carlaw Park. Bill Walsh was also playing his first game of the year in the five eighths position for Ponsonby. They struggled against a strong City side losing 25-0 with Jack Keenan having moved from the five eighths out to the wing scoring one of their five tries. Keenan was a well known boxer who fought around New Zealand in the 1920s and had been the New Zealand light weight champion in 1920-21.

9 June	Athletic	9–0	Marist	Carlaw Park 1
3:00	Try: Wilson Hall; Pen: Craddock Dufty 3			Attendance: 2,500; Referee: Bert Gallagher

9 June	City	25–0	Ponsonby	Carlaw Park 2
3:00	Try: Maurice Wetherill, Jack Keenan, Vic Thomas, C Mitchell, Harry Hawkes; Con: Bill Davidson 4 Pen: Bill Davidson			Attendance: 2,500; Referee: Leonard Neild

9 June	Devonport	9–5	Newton	Devonport Domain
3:00	Try: Alex Godick, Cyril Wheeler, G Smith		Try: H McNeil; Con: Clarrie Polson	Referee: T Hill

==== Round 6 ====
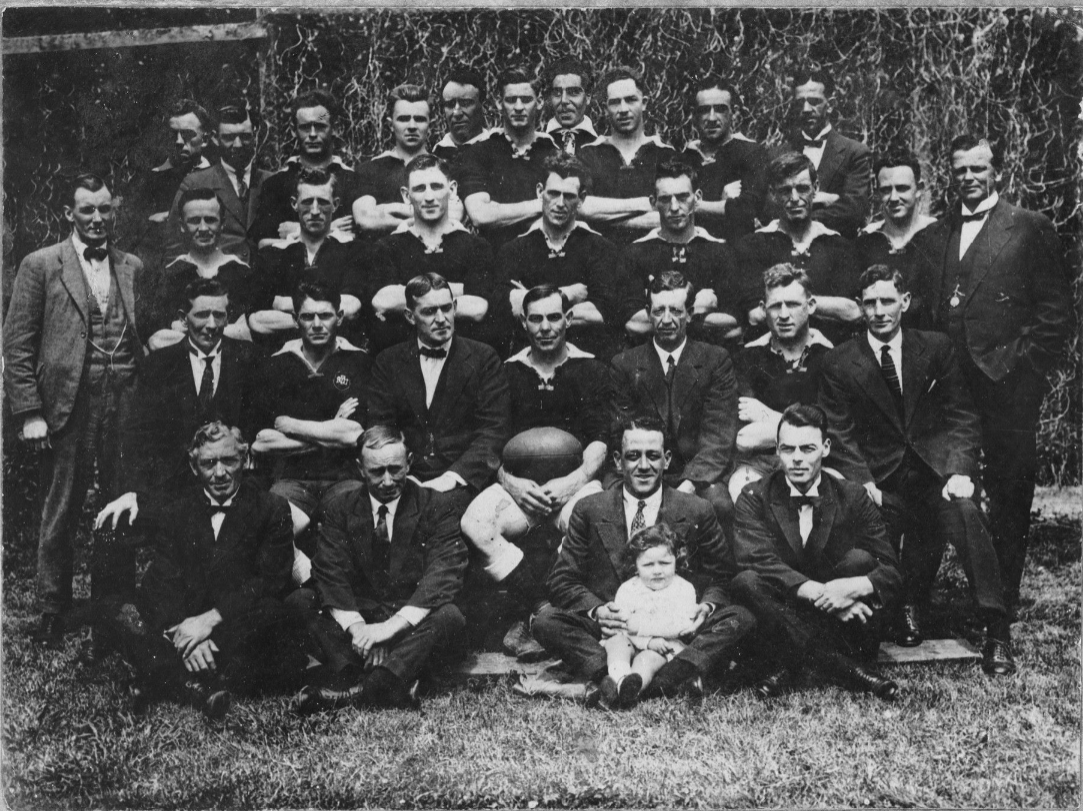
The Devonport senior side. Neville St George is on the left in the back row. Two to his right is Stan Webb, with Allan Seagar 6th from the left. In the 3rd row Alf Scott is 4th from the left. Seated holding the ball is Bert Laing, and 2 to his right is Jim O'Brien. All played for New Zealand.

During the week a rule was brought in whereby the player putting the ball into the scrum had to throw it from three paces away.

16 June	Marist	15–5 (5-0)	City	Carlaw Park 1
3:00	Try: Nelson Bass, Baden Foss, C Stevens; Con: Bill Stormont 2 Pen: Bill Stormont		Try: Harry Hawkes; Con: Bill Davidson	Attendance: 6,500; Referee: Les Bull

16 June	Newton	23–9 (9-4)	Richmond	Carlaw Park 2
3:00	Try: E Watson, Clarrie Polson 2, Alan Clarke, Peters 2, L O'Donnell; Con: Clarrie Polson		Try: Kettlewell (obstruction try); Con: McDonald; Pen: McDonald 2	Attendance: 6,500; Referee: Robert Bouvaird

16 June	Devonport	5–13 (3-10)	Ponsonby	Devonport Domain
3:00	Try: Bert Laing; Con: Stan Webb		Try: Bill Walsh, William Hanlon, Wilson; Con: Frank Delgrosso; Pen: Frank Delgrosso	Referee: Billy Murray

==== Round 7 ====
23 June	City	7–0	Athletic	Carlaw Park 1
3:00	Try: Purdie; Con: Bill Davidson; Pen: Bill Davidson (mark)			Attendance: 8000; Referee: Billy Murray

23 June	Ponsonby	14–12	Richmond	Carlaw Park 2
3:00	Try: A McClure, Williams, Frank Delgrosso, Sam Lowrie; Con: Frank Delgrosso		Try: McKenzie, Butler; Pen: McDonald (pen & mark), Unknown (pen)	Attendance: 8000; Referee: Ladbury (Ray) Hemming

23 June	Devonport	13–18	Marist	Devonport Domain
3:00	Try: Jim O'Brien, Johnson, Probert; Con: Alf Harper, Stan Webb		Try: Sid McNamara, Billy Ghent, Percy Gallagher 3, Stevens	Referee: Bert Gallagher

==== Round 8 ====
Ponsonby defaulted their match with Newton after they could only manage 8 players. Only 2,000 spectators came to see the other match which took place in "mud and slush".

30 June	Athletic	14–8	Devonport	Carlaw Park 1
3:00	Try: Ernie Herring 2, L Lee, Graham; Con: Craddock Dufty		Try: Alf Harper, G Smith; Pen: Charles Hand	Attendance: 2000; Referee: William Mincham

30 June	Newton	WBD – LBD	Ponsonby	Carlaw Park 2
3:00				Referee: A Saunders

30 June	Marist	20–3	Richmond	Auckland Domain 2
3:00	Try: Percy Gallagher, Bill Stormont, Sid McNamara, Nelson Bass, Stevenson, Billy Ghent; Con: Bill Stormont		Try: J McLean	Referee: Leonard Nield

==== Round 9 ====
With weeks of wet weather the Carlaw Park fields were in a terrible condition so the Auckland Rugby League played all of their senior games at Victoria Park and the Auckland Domain.

7 July	Devonport	13–10	City	Victoria Park 1
3:00	Try: Jim O'Brien, Bert Laing, Alex Godick; Con: C Garrett; Pen: C Garrett (mark)		Try: Harry Hawkes, 'Chook' Mitchell; Con: Mike Flynn; Pen: Mike Flynn	Attendance: 5000; Referee: Bert Gallagher

7 July	Marist	16–4	Newton	Auckland Domain 1
3:00	Try: Percy Gallagher, Bill Stormont, Jock Johnson, Sid McNamara; Con: Bill Stormont, Stevens		Pen: Clarrie Polson (pen & mark)	Referee: Billy Murray

7 July	Athletic	22–5	Richmond	Auckland Domain 3
3:00	Try: Bert Avery, W Miller 2, C Timmins, Craddock Dufty, Unknown x 1 (either Ernie Herring or Monteith); Con: Wilson Hall, Unknown x 1		Try: McKenzie; Pen: Butler	Referee: Les Bull

==== Round 10 ====
Richmond defaulted their match with City as they had a large number of players injured or ill.

14 July	Athletic	11–5	Newton	Carlaw Park 1
3:00	Try: Graham, Bert Avery, Charles (Snow) Webb; Con: Craddock Dufty		Try: Watson; Pen: Clarrie Polson	Attendance: 2500; Referee: Les Bull

14 July	Marist	14–8	Ponsonby	Carlaw Park 2
3:00	Try: John Lang, Stevens 2, Percy Gallagher; Pen: Nelson Bass (mark)		Try: A McClure, Eric McGregor; Con: Frank Delgrosso	Attendance: 2500; Referee: A Saunders

14 July	City	WBD – LBD	Richmond	Auckland Domain 4
3:00				Referee: Leonard Nield

==== Round 11 ====
Kettlewell, a back in the Richmond team had to leave the field with a broken collarbone in their 19-10 loss to Devonport. He had earlier scored a try in the match. In the same game future New Zealand international Allan Seagar debuted and scored a try for Devonport. Bill Davidson also left the field injured in City's 35-3 win over Newton. He had scored a try and kicked two conversions while his brother George scored three tries and their other brother, Ben added another.

21 July	City	35–3	Newton	Carlaw Park 1
3:00	Try: George Cargill, Bill Davidson, F Wilson, George Davidson 3, Ben Davidson, Harry Hawkes, Alf Townsend; Con: Bill Davidson 2, Maurice Wetherill, Harry Hawkes		Try: N Peters	Attendance: 2,500; Referee: William Mincham

21 July	Devonport	19–10	Richmond	Carlaw Park 2
3:00	Try: Alf Harper, Stan Webb 2, Johnson, Allan Seagar; Con: Alf Harper, Johnson		Try: Hyland, Kettlewell; Con: McDonald; Pen: McDonald	Attendance: 2,500; Referee: Bert Gallagher

21 July	Athletic	17–9	Ponsonby	Otahuhu 1
3:00	Try: Harry Francis, Craddock Dufty, Ernie Herring, W Kirkland, Graham; Con: Wilson Hall		Try: Williams 2, D Black	Referee: Walter Ripley

==== Round 12 ====
City fullback Mike Flynn broke his ankle while playing and was taken to the hospital. Flynn was a boxer from Australia who used to travel to New Zealand to fight and also played rugby league for Maritime/Athletic from 1921 to 1922 when he also made seven appearances for Auckland, and then for City in 1923 and 1924.

28 July	Athletic	7–6	Marist	Carlaw Park 1
3:00	Try: Bert Avery; Pen: George Yardley, Craddock Dufty		Try: Hec Brisbane, Billy Ghent	Referee: Billy Murray

28 July	City	39–2	Ponsonby	Carlaw Park 2
3:00	Try: Ben Davidson, Bill Davidson, F Wilson 2, Alf Townsend, George Davidson 2, Harry Hawkes, G Cargill; Con: Bill Davidson, George Davidson, Mike Flynn, Harry Hawkes 2, Wilcox		Pen: Frank Delgrosso	Referee: Les Bull

28 July	Devonport	22–8	Newton	Victoria Park
3:00	Try: Alex Godick 3, Charles Hand, Stan Webb, Johnson; Con: Unknown x 1, Neville St George		Try: Alan Clarke, Lou Brown; Con: Clarrie Polson	Referee: Bert Gallagher

==== Round 13 ====
11 August	City	14–3	Marist	Carlaw Park 1
3:00	Try: George Davidson, F Wilson, Alf Townsend, Bill Davidson; Con: Harry Hawkes		Try: Bill Stormont	Attendance: 7000; Referee: Leonard Nield

11 August	Devonport	8–4	Ponsonby	Carlaw Park 2
3:00	Try: Bert Laing, Cyril Wheeler; Con: Charles Hand		Pen: Frank Delgrosso 2	Attendance: 7000; Referee: Walter Ripley

11 August	Richmond	14–5	Newton	Victoria Park
3:00	Try: McDonald, Jack Campney; Con: McDonald 2 Pen: McDonald, McKenzie		Try: Lou Brown; Con: Clarrie Polson	Referee: Robert Bouvaird

==== Round 14 ====
The match between City and Athletic saw two forwards ordered off, one from each team. Hec McDonald the future Kiwi debuted for City in the match after being drawn to Auckland from the Rotorua where he had been playing rugby, though he had previously played rugby league in the Waikato area. In the match between Ponsonby and Richmond the former side led 16-0 at halftime, then Richmond lost McMillan and Sutherland to injury and had to play with 11 players. Ponsonby then scored 23 more points. Both Alf Townsend (City), and Ernie Herring (Athletic) were sent off in their match which was won by City 11-8. Townsend was suspended for two games and Herring for one. City also lost Harry Francis to injury during the first half, while Maurice Wetherill suffered a broken nose but played on, and during the second half George Davidson was concussed and went off.

18 August	City	11–8	Athletic	Carlaw Park 1
3:00	Try: Bill Davidson 2, Ben Davidson; Con: Bill Davidson		Try: Bert Avery 2 Con: George Yardley	Attendance: 7,500; Referee: Walter Ripley

18 August	Marist	20–16	Devonport	Carlaw Park 1
1:45	Try: Baden Foss, Stevens 2, Con: Stevens 3		Try: Alf Harper, Bert Laing, Harry Douglas, Stan Webb; Con: Bert Laing, Stan Webb	Attendance: 7,500; Referee: B Bovaird

18 August	Ponsonby	39–5	Richmond	Carlaw Park 2
3:00	Try: A McClure, Leonard Riley, John Shirley 2, Frank Delgrosso, George Mormon, W Henderson, Sam Lowrie, Wilfred McNeil; Con: Frank Delgrosso 2, Sam Lowrie, Wilfred McNeil, Thomas McClymont 2		Try: McLean; Con: McDonald	Attendance: 7,500; Referee: Les Bull

==== Championship final ====
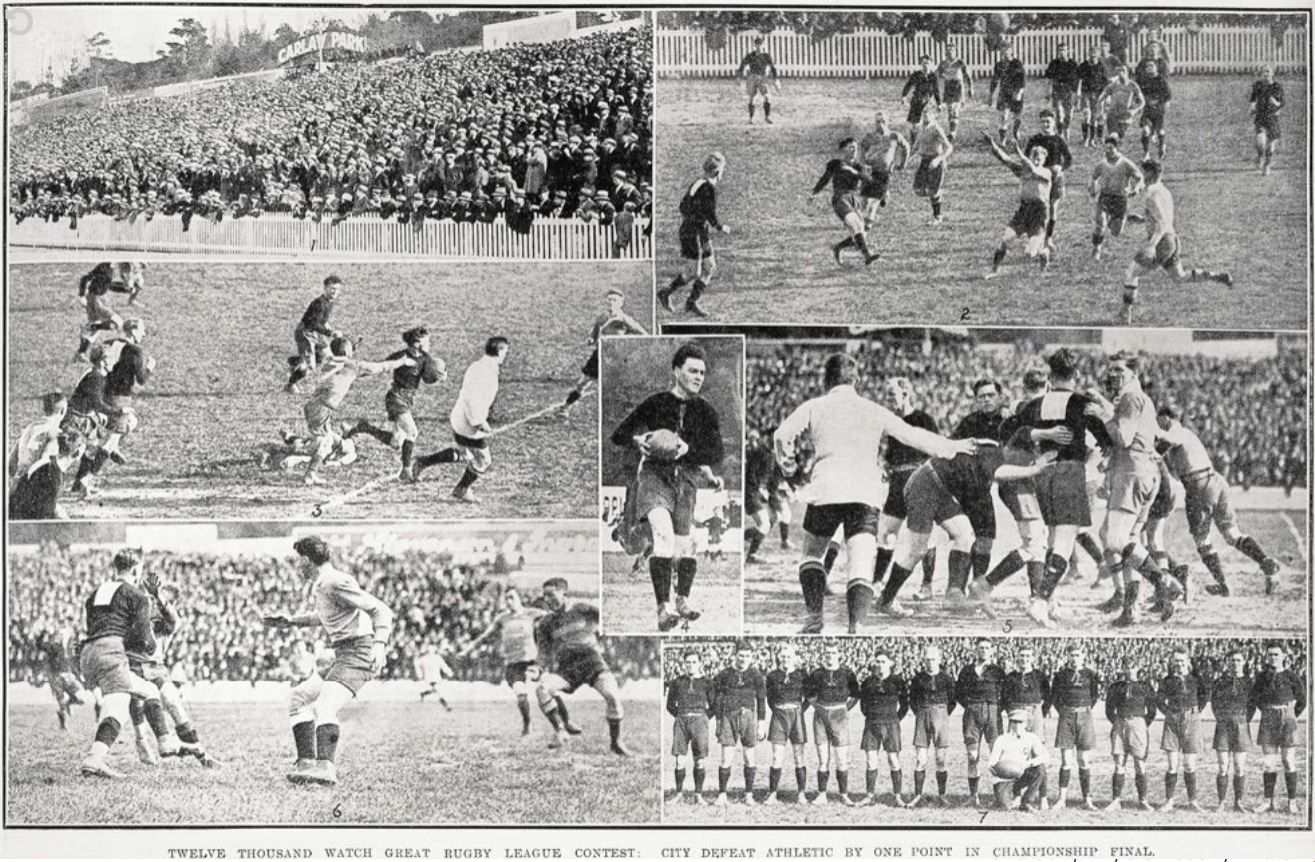
Scenes from the 1923 championship final.

The championship final drew the largest crowd of the club season with 11,500 in attendance and saw 350 pounds in gate sales. City Rovers won their 3rd consecutive 1st grade title and 6th in their short history.

25 August	City	8–7	Athletic	Carlaw Park 1
3:00	Try: F Wilson, Maurice Wetherill; Pen: Bill Davidson		Try: Bert Avery; Pen: Craddock Dufty 2	Attendance: 11,500; Referee: Bert Gallagher

== Roope Rooster knockout competition ==
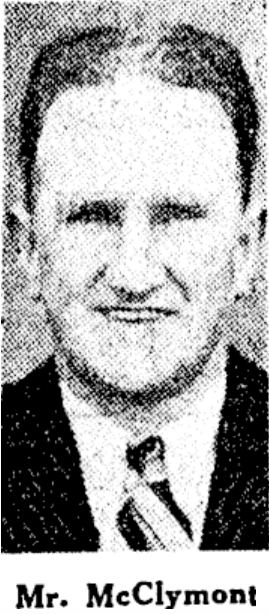
Thomas McClymont

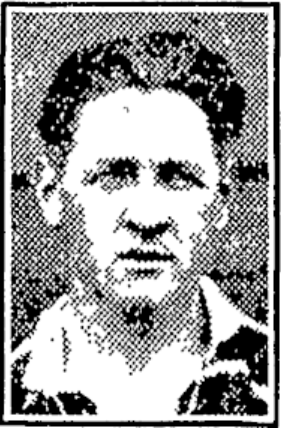
Ivan Littlewood

The Roope Rooster competition was interesting as Ponsonby went on to win it despite being uncompetitive in the First Grade competition. Thomas McClymont and Bill Walsh emerged from retirement, and Ivan Littlewood transferred back to the club from Waikato where he had moved, to bolster their team for the Roope Rooster competition. They defeated Richmond and Marist comprehensively before beating a slightly weakened City team (with Maurice Wetherill suffering from influenza, and Bill Davidson with a leg injury) in the final 14–8.

=== Round 1 ===
Athletic had a forward ordered off early in their match with Devonport United but still managed to lead at halftime before conceding the lead and the match in the second half. Redmond Lonergan of the Athletic side injured his spine and was taken to hospital. In the Marist match v Newton Courtney was sent off for striking the Newton hooker, Wally Somers. While in the Athletic match with Devonport Ernie Herring was warned by the referee (Les Bull), and then committed an obstruction offence shortly after and was sent off.

1 September	Devonport	21–16 (5-6)	Athletic	Carlaw Park 1
3:00	Try: Alf Harper, Alex Godick, Cyril Wheeler, Bert Laing 2 Con: Charles Hand, Bert Laing; Pen: Charles Hand		Try: Bert Avery, Jack Miller; Con: Craddock Dufty 2 Pen: Craddock Dufty 3	Attendance: 5000; Referee: Les Bull

1 September	Marist	43–20	Newton	Carlaw Park 2
3:00	Try: Bill Stormont 4, Hec Brisbane 3, John Lang, Baden Foss; Con: Stevens 6, Hec Brisbane; Pen: Bill Stormont		Try: Clarrie Polson, Watson, Bill Williams, Wally Somers; Con: Clarrie Polson, Unknown x 1 Pen: Clarrie Polson, Alan Clarke	Attendance: 5000; Referee: Robert Bouvaird

1 September	Ponsonby	43–18	Richmond	Auckland Domain
3:00	Try: Joseph Peckham 2, Frank Delgrosso 2, Thomas McClymont, Ivan Littlewood 3, McMahon; Con: Frank Delgrosso, Thomas McClymont 3, Ivan Littlewood 3, William Hanlon		Try: Butler 3, Barber; Con: McNeil 2 Pen: McNeil	Referee: Billy Murray

=== Semi finals ===
8 September	City	49–12	Devonport	Carlaw Park 1
3:00	Try: F Wilson 2, Sam Crewther, Ben Davidson, Casey, George Davidson 3, Maurice Wetherill 2, Harry Hawkes 2, Hec McDonald; Con: George Davidson 3, Sam Crewther, Harry Hawkes		Try: Harry Douglas, Smith; Con: Charles Hand, Neville St George; Pen: Charles Hand	Attendance: 6000; Referee: Billy Murray

8 September	Ponsonby	34–12	Marist	Carlaw Park 2
3:00	Try: Donovan 2, Joseph Peckham 2, Wilfred McNeil, Bill Walsh; Con: Thomas McClymont 3, Ivan Littlewood; Pen: Thomas McClymont, Frank Delgrosso 2 Drop: Eric Grey		Try: M Kirkland, A Nelson; Con: Bill Stormont, John Lang; Pen: Bill Stormont	Attendance: 6000; Referee: Bert Gallagher

=== Final ===
15 September	Ponsonby	14–3	City	Carlaw Park 1
3:00	Try: Thomas McClymont, Ivan Littlewood; Con: Thomas McClymont; Pen: Thomas McClymont 3		Try: Ben Davidson	Attendance: 7000; Referee: Bert Gallagher

== Top try scorers and point scorers ==
These lists include tries and points scored in the first grade competition and the Roope Rooster knockout competition. Alex Godick of Devonport, who scored 6 tries during the season later moved to Fiji to live and help promote the game of rugby union there.

Top try scorers
Rk	Player	Team	Gms	Tries
1	George Davidson	City	14	13
2	Bert Avery	Athletic	14	12
3	Ben Davidson	City	14	11
4=	Harry Hawkes	City	12	10
4=	C M Stevens	Marist	12	10
6	Bill Stormont	Marist	13	9
7=	Percy Gallagher	Marist	11	7
7=	Bert Laing	Devonport	10	7
7=	Craddock Dufty	Athletic	14	7
7=	F Wilson	City	14	7

Top point scorers
Rk	Player	Team	G	T	C	P	M	Pts
1	Craddock Dufty	Athletic	14	7	12	7	0	59
2	Frank Delgrosso	Ponsonby	13	6	10	10	0	58
3	Bill Stormont	Marist	13	9	6	6	2	55
4	George Davidson	City	14	13	4	0	0	47
5	Clarrie Polson	Newton	12	5	10	4	1	45
6	Bill Davidson	City	12	5	12	1	1	43
7	Harry Hawkes	City	12	10	5	0	0	40
8	C M Stevens	Marist	12	10	4	0	0	38
9	Bert Avery	Athletic	14	12	0	0	0	36
10	Ben Davidson	City	14	11	0	0	0	33

== Other senior club matches and competitions ==
=== Athletic v Wednesday representative team ===
During the season a Wednesday afternoon competition was played and it was decided to play a match between Athletic who had a bye and a representative team from that competition as curtain-raiser to the City Rovers – Marist Old Boys match.

11 August	Athletic	9–5	Wednesday Representative Team	Carlaw Park 1
2:00	Try: Charles (Snow) Webb, Bert Avery, George Yardley		Try: Halliday; Pen: Halliday

=== Labour Day Carnival and charity sevens tournament ===
On 20 October there was a carnival held at Carlaw Park with 7 a-side football on one field and seven-a-side rugby league on the other. There were three first round matches played with Richmond, Athletic A, and Devonport victorious. Richmond received a bye in the semi-finals and met Athletic in the final who they defeated 5 points to 0.

The following weekend another seven-a-side tournament was held at Carlaw Park to raise money for the Takapuna Orphanage which was destroyed by fire. Unfortunately the weather was particularly bad in the morning which had an effect on the attendance with only 1,000 spectators. The teams were supposed to composed of senior players but in reality were largely made up of junior players.

Seven-a-side carnival results
	Date		Score		Score	Venue
First Round	20 Oct	Richmond	2	Athletic B	0	Carlaw Park
First Round	20 Oct	Athletic A	5	Marist Old Boys	3	Carlaw Park
First Round	20 Oct	Devonport	10	Ponsonby	6	Carlaw Park
Semi Final	20 Oct	Athletic A	6	Devonport	3	Carlaw Park
Final	20 Oct	Richmond	5	Athletic A	0	Carlaw Park

Seven-a-side tournament results
	Date		Score		Score	Venue	Attendance
First Round	27 Oct	Devonport	21	Athletic	3	Carlaw Park	1,000
First Round	27 Oct	Ponsonby	9	City	0	Carlaw Park	
Semi Final	27 Oct	Devonport	14	Marist Old Boys	8	Carlaw Park	
Final	27 Oct	Devonport	WBD	Ponsonby	LBD	Carlaw Park	

=== Exhibition matches ===
==== Hamilton v Marist ====
On June 2 Marist had a bye and so travelled to Hamilton to play a local Hamilton representative side. Hamilton won 28-13 against a Marist team missing 5 of its regular players.

2 June	Hamilton	28-13	Marist	Hinemoa Park, Hamilton
3:00	Try: J Sorenson, Payne, Jacques, Grice, J Dufty 2 Con: J Dufty 4, Tim Peckham		Try: Hec Brisbane, Baden Foss 2 Con: Baden Foss; Pen: Baden Foss	Referee: Mr. Herrick

==== Ponsonby v City ('champion of champions') ====
On September 22 Ponsonby (winners of the Roope Rooster) and City (winners of the championship) met in an exhibition game. The concept would be the same as the Stormont Shield champion of champions format which started two years later. Ponsonby led 3-0 at half time and held on to win before a crowd of 7,000. Harry Hawkes, the City forward went off with a cut around his eye in the first half and was replaced by H McLaughlin, while in the second half George Davidson was injured in a tackle when scoring City's lone try. Then later his brother Ben went off with an injured arm leaving them with just 11 players.

22 September	Ponsonby	6-3	City	Carlaw Park
3:00	Try: Joseph Peckham, Eric Grey		Try: George Davidson	Attendance: 7,000; Referee: Les Bull

==== Other games ====
Richmond travelled to Taumarunui towards the end of the season when they had a bye in the First Grade competition and were victorious against the local side by 14 points to 5. On 15 September the Athletic and Parnell 4th grade teams played a match in Whangarei which was the first time and organised game of rugby league had been played in the area. As both of the teams were composed of junior players, the game was not of a high standard and gained little interest.

List of Exhibition Matches
	Date		Score		Score	Venue	Attendance
Exhibition Match	28 July	Taumarunui	5	Richmond	14	Taumarunui	
G Stevens Benefit Match	5 Sep	Newton	16	Wednesday Representatives	11	Carlaw Park	1,200
Exhibition Match	15 Sep	Athletic 4th Grade	11	Parnell 4th Grade	9	Kensington Park, Whangarei	
Exhibition Match	6 Oct	Huntly	3	Kingsland Rovers	20	Huntly	

== Lower grades ==
There were 8 lower grade competitions in 1923 with the 6th grade split into an A and B division, while the Cadets competition ran again and a Wednesday Competition was also run featuring businesses and professions. The Richmond club refused to play any of its scheduled May 5 games in protest at the allocation of venues. The ARL in response decided to replay that their move was ill-timed and unavailing as a protest. And that they should have played the games and then protested in order to be heard.

=== Second grade ===
City Rovers won the competition after defeating Māngere Rangers 16-3 on September 8. Earlier in the season on June 2 the two sides drew 6-6 but the match was later awarded to Mangere as City had an "unqualified" player. The standings are incomplete with most teams playing around 14 matches but less than half were reported. On August 14 with the competition nearing its end the New Zealand Herald reported that Māngere were on 20 points, City 16, and Otahuhu and Kingsland were on 14. City had 2 games in hand and it appears Māngere must have lost their last match with City winning both of there's and forcing a playoff for the competition on September 8, which they won. Māngere won the knockout competition (Foster Memorial Shield). Northcote & Birkenhead Ramblers withdrew after 7 rounds and had defaulted at least two matches to that point.

Team	Pld	W	D	L	B	F	A	Pts
City Rovers	15	10	1	4	1	126	49	21
Māngere Rangers	13	10	0	3	0	95	45	20
Otahuhu Rovers	14	7	0	6	0	35	17	14
Kingsland Rovers	13	7	0	5	0	71	44	14
Newton Rangers	13	2	0	2	1	40	29	4
Ponsonby United	11	1	1	4	0	63	69	3
Ihumātao	14	1	0	3	0	32	50	2
Devonport United	10	1	0	3	0	29	51	2
Ellerslie United	12	1	0	2	0	5	27	2
Marist Old Boys	12	0	0	2	0	8	40	0
Athletic	11	0	0	4	0	5	77	0
Northcote & Birkenhead Ramblers	2	0	0	0	0	0	0	0

=== Third grade (Myers Cup) ===
The points for the five leading teams was mentioned in an article in the New Zealand Herald on August 14 when City and Manukau had no games remaining while Richmond, Ponsonby, and Point Chevalier each had two games left. After wins by Ponsonby and Point Chevalier they overtook City and Manukau and needed a playoff for the title. Ponsonby United won the competition, defeating Point Chevalier in the final 10-7 on September 15. Ellerslie, Kingsland and Marist all withdrew after round 7. Each of them had defaulted multiple matches prior to this. 16 rounds were played in total but there were few results reported, though the majority of Ponsonby's matches did have their result published. The Victoria Cruising Club entered a team. They were a boating club based in the Westhaven Marina adjacent to the southern end of the Auckland Harbour Bridge.

Team	Pld	W	D	L	B	F	A	Pts
Ponsonby United	15	13	1	1	1	133	20	27
Point Chevalier	15	10	0	5	1	72	35	20
City Rovers	12	10	0	2	1	0	15	20
Manukau	12	10	1	1	2	87	3	21
Richmond Rovers	11	9	0	2	4	22	23	18
Devonport United	12	3	0	2	2	24	24	6
Parnell	12	3	0	5	0	45	46	6
Victoria Cruising Club	11	3	0	5	3	13	16	6
Coromandel Old Boys	11	2	0	6	0	7	47	4
Ellerslie United	3	1	0	2	0	3	0	2
Kingsland Rovers	13	0	1	8	2	16	53	1
Marist Old Boys	5	0	1	3	0	3	33	1
Ihumātao	12	0	0	6	1	6	116	0
Newton Rangers	4	0	0	3	0	0	0	0

=== Fourth grade ===
Devonport United won the championship on September 29 when they beat Athletic 24-5 in the final. Neither team had many of their results reported and therefore the standings are very incomplete although the New Zealand Herald gave the points of the leading teams near the end of the season. Marist withdrew after 6 rounds when they had already defaulted at least 3 matches.

Team	Pld	W	D	L	B	F	A	Pts
Devonport United	13	10	0	3	0	32	17	20
Athletic	12	9	0	3	0	44	24	18
Parnell	13	7	1	3	0	55	6	15
City Rovers	15	7	0	7	0	14	0	14
Otahuhu Rovers	16	6	0	9	1	0	0	12
Ellerslie United	11	2	0	3	0	36	36	4
Kingsland Rovers	9	1	0	0	1	8	5	2
Newton Rangers	9	0	0	3	1	12	34	0
Māngere Rangers	10	0	0	2	0	5	47	0
Ponsonby United	12	0	0	1	1	5	55	0
Marist Old Boys	4	0	0	3	1	0	0	0

=== Fifth grade (Endean Memorial Shield) ===
Richmond secured the championship when they defeated Newton 11-0 in the final round. Ponsonby withdrew from the competition after 3 rounds when they had defaulted their matches up to this point. Athletic withdrew after 4 rounds when they too had been defaulting matches. There were 14 rounds played but many results were not reported and so the standings are incomplete. Richmond, City, Point Chevalier, Northcote & Birkenhead, and Newton had the majority of their results reported but 5 or 6 not reported in each case. City won the knockout competition when they beat Newton 18-0 on September 29.

Team	Pld	W	D	L	B	F	A	Pts
Richmond Rovers	14	10	0	4	0	140	24	20
Takapuna	12	9	1	3	0	52	12	19
City Rovers	11	7	2	2	2	70	22	16
Newton Rangers	11	7	0	4	0	40	76	14
Northcote & Birkenhead Ramblers	9	4	0	5	1	49	93	8
Manukau	11	2	0	1	3	47	8	4
Marist Old Boys	10	2	0	4	2	39	51	4
Point Chevalier	11	1	0	7	1	7	158	2
Athletic	4	0	0	2	0	0	0	0
Ponsonby United	3	0	0	2	0	0	0	0

=== Sixth grade A ===
Ponsonby won the competition. Newton finished runner up after they beat Parnell 5-3 in the final round. Otahuhu won the Hamill Cup which was the knockout competition trophy when they beat Ponsonby 21-0 on October 20, and then Devonport 21-0 in the final on October 27. There were very few results reported in the championship although the majority of Ponsonby and Athletics results were reported.

Team	Pld	W	D	L	B	F	A	Pts
Ponsonby United	13	8	2	3	0	85	37	18
City Rovers	14	6	2	5	0	36	33	14
Athletic	13	6	2	4	0	54	15	14
Richmond Rovers B	8	3	2	3	0	61	41	8
Richmond Rovers A	13	3	1	2	0	52	11	7
Parnell	13	2	1	4	0	21	33	5
Manukau	13	2	0	2	0	27	47	4
Marist Old Boys	13	0	0	3	0	2	12	0
Otahuhu Rovers	14	0	0	1	0	0	3	0
Devonport United	12	0	0	6	0	2	108	0

=== Sixth grade B ===
Athletic won the competition. There were many results not reported however after round 15 on August 18 it was reported that City's 10-0 win over Athletic brought them within 1 competition point of Athletic which gave a clue as to several earlier matches played.

Team	Pld	W	D	L	B	F	A	Pts
Athletic	18	11	2	1	0	127	28	24
City Rovers	19	9	2	4	0	124	30	20
Parnell	18	8	1	4	1	69	32	17
Manukau Cruising Club	9	3	2	2	0	29	20	8
Marist Old Boys	16	3	1	4	0	19	40	7
Ellerslie United	18	1	1	5	0	16	61	3
Richmond Rovers	13	1	0	9	0	18	145	2
Ponsonby United	17	0	1	6	0	17	63	1

=== Cadet competition ===
The Cadet competition was won by the 29th Company from Ponsonby. Only around half of the results were reported.

Team	Pld	W	D	L	B	F	A	Pts
29th Company (Ponsonby)	8	7	0	1	0	98	48	14
36th A Company	3	2	1	0	1	25	7	5
27th Company	7	2	1	4	0	51	50	5
34th Company	5	2	0	3	1	27	45	4
22nd Company	4	2	0	2	0	19	42	4
36th B Company	5	0	0	5	0	9	37	0

=== Wednesday Competition ===
The Post and Telegraph side won the Wednesday Competition which was played for by businesses and professions. Post and Telegraph beat Tramways 16-15 on September 26. On September 13 a Taxi Drivers side beat Bakers 21-9 at Carlaw Park. A Bakers player (T. McPherson) broke his ankle and was taken home). On September 20 the Post and Telegraph side played against the Wednesday representative team as curtain-raiser to the Auckland Province - New South Wales match at Carlaw Park. Post and Telegraph won 33 to 11 with future New Zealand international Arthur Singe scoring 2 tries and kicking a conversion. Wally Somers was also in the Post and Telegraph side.

Team	Pld	W	D	L	B	F	A	Pts
Post and Telegraph	8	7	0	1	1	110	76	14
Tramways	9	6	0	3	0	132	69	12
Taxi Drivers	6	3	0	3	1	39	45	6
Railway	7	2	0	5	1	54	94	4
Carters	6	0	0	6	1	42	93	0

== Representative season ==
The Auckland representative side played 5 matches. They started the season with a match against Wellington in which they ran up a huge score, winning by 71 points to 12. Their second match was played mid week against Hamilton, before two games against South Auckland and finishing the season with a game against an Auckland provincial team.

Auckland challenged South Auckland for the Northern Union Cup which it had lost to the same opponents in 2022. The match was drawn and so South Auckland retained the cup. Auckland later played an Auckland provincial team and won comfortably in front of 7,000 spectators on Carlaw Park. A curtain-raiser was played between the Referees Association and the Junior Advisory Board, and was won by the former by 10 points to 6. In the final full league fixture of the season Auckland played South Auckland again and were this time victorious 25 to 11.

=== Auckland v Wellington ===
Every single member of the Auckland team scored points aside from Bill Davidson which was ironic given that he was one of Auckland Rugby League's most prolific point scorers.

22 August	Auckland	71–12	Wellington	Carlaw Park 1
3:00	Try: Alex Godick 3, Ben Davidson 4, Frank Delgrosso 2, Bert Laing 2, Vic Thomas, Wally Somers, William Hanlon, Bill Stormont, Harry Douglas, Nelson Bass; Con: Alex Godick 2, Bert Laing 2, Wilson Hall, Clarrie Polson 3, Wally Somers, Nelson Bass		Try: J Hedges, T Ryan; Con: D Whittington; Pen: D Whittington, A Greer	Attendance: 5,000; Referee: Ripley

=== Auckland v Hamilton ===
In the match with Hamilton which, was played midweek, there were no players from the Ponsonby United and City Rovers clubs available as they were playing the Roope Rooster final on the following Saturday.

12 September	Auckland	22–16	Hamilton	Carlaw Park 1
3:00	Try: Craddock Dufty 2, Clarrie Polson 2, Nelson Bass, Harry Douglas; Con: Craddock Dufty, Clarrie Polson		Try: McVeay 2, N Vernall, Paki; Con: McVeay; Pen: McVeay	Attendance: 2,000; Referee: W Murray

=== South Auckland v Auckland (Northern Union Challenge Cup) ===
15 September	South Auckland (Waikato)	20–20	Auckland	Steele Park, Hamilton
3:00	Try: J Payne 2, Wilson, Lyall Stewart; Con: John Dufty 2 Pen: John Dufty		Try: Craddock Dufty, Hec Brisbane, Stevens, Stan Webb; Con: Craddock Dufty 2, Clarrie Polson 2	Referee: T Hill

=== Auckland v Auckland Province ===
29 September	Auckland	44–15	Auckland Province	Carlaw Park 1
3:00	Try: Craddock Dufty, Bert Laing, Ivan Littlewood, Maurice Wetherill, Clarrie Polson, Johnston, Richard Stack, Jim O'Brien, Hec McDonald 2 Con: Craddock Dufty, Ivan Littlewood 2, F Wilson 2, Clarrie Polson 2		Try: Lyall Stewart, Wilson Hall, M McNeil; Con: Selby Crewther; Pen: Joseph Dufty, Selby Crewther	Attendance: 7000; Referee: Billy Murray

=== Auckland v South Auckland ===
13 October	Auckland	35–11	South Auckland	Carlaw Park 1
3:00	Try: Ben Davidson 2, Maurice Wetherill 2, Clarrie Polson, Wally Somers, Hec McDonald; Con: Craddock Dufty 3, Clarrie Polson 3 Pen: Craddock Dufty		Try: Jackson, Joe Dufty, Lyall Stewart; Drop: George Raynor	Attendance: 6,000; Referee: A Saunders

== Auckland representative matches played and scorers ==
No	Name	Club Team	Play	Tries	Con	Pen	Points
1	Clarrie Polson	Newton	5	5	9	0	33
2	Craddock Dufty	Athletic	4	4	7	1	28
3	Ben Davidson	City	2	6	0	0	18
4	Alex Godick	Devonport	2	3	2	0	13
5	Hec McDonald	City	2	3	0	0	9
5	Maurice Wetherill	City	2	3	0	0	9
5	Bert Laing	Devonport	4	3	0	0	9
8	Wally Somers	Newton	4	2	1	0	8
8	Nelson Bass	Marist	5	2	1	0	8
10	Ivan Littlewood	Ponsonby	2	1	2	0	7
11	Harry Douglas	Devonport	4	2	0	0	6
11	Frank Delgrosso	Ponsonby	1	2	0	0	6
13	F Wilson	City	3	0	2	0	4
14	Hec Brisbane	Marist	2	1	0	0	3
14	Jim O'Brien	Devonport	2	1	0	0	3
14	Stan Webb	Devonport	1	1	0	0	3
14	Stevens	Marist	2	1	0	0	3
14	Richard Stack	Newton	2	1	0	0	3
14	Johnson	Devonport	1	1	0	0	3
14	Vic Thomas	City	3	1	0	0	3
14	Bill Stormont	Marist	2	1	0	0	3
14	William Hanlon	Ponsonby	1	1	0	0	3
23	Wilson Hall	Athletic	3	0	1	0	2
24	Billy Ghent	Marist	2	0	0	0	0
24	John McGregor	Athletic	1	0	0	0	0
24	Bert Avery	Athletic	1	0	0	0	0
24	M Sherlock	Marist	2	0	0	0	0
24	M McNeil	Richmond	1	0	0	0	0
24	McDonald	Richmond	2	0	0	0	0
24	Charles (Snow) Webb	Athletic	1	0	0	0	0
