= Coromandel Old Boys Rugby League Club =

Defunct New Zealand rugby league club, based in Auckland

Club information
- Full name: Coromandel Old Boys Rugby League Club
- Short name: Coromandel, Coromandel Old Boys, Coromandel United
- Colours: Red, White, & Blue
- Founded: 1922
- Exited: 1925

Former details
- Competition: Auckland Rugby League

The Coromandel Old Boys Rugby League Club was a rugby league club in Auckland, New Zealand which existed from 1922 to 1925. They competed in the Auckland Rugby League 3rd grade competition in each season. They represented players who had moved to the Auckland area from the Coromandel Peninsula, ostensibly as the gold rush era finished.

== History ==
=== 1922 formation ===
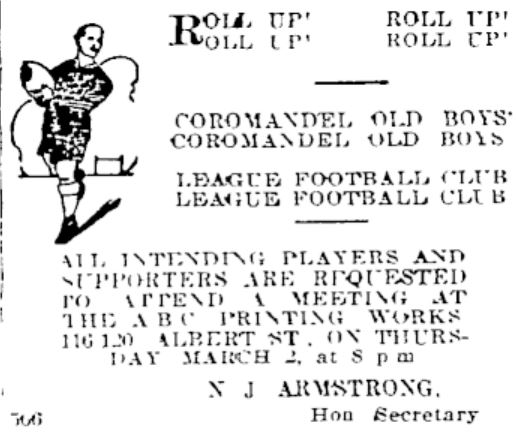
Newspaper notice for players and supporters in 1922.

Relatively little was reported on the club during their four seasons in the Auckland Rugby League competition aside from their fixtures which were published weekly in the Auckland Star and New Zealand Herald. On February 15, 1922, The Auckland Rugby League held their weekly management committee meeting and said that “affiliation was granted to a new third grade club to be called Coromandel Old Boys, with the colours red, white, and blue”. A club had existed representing Thames Old Boys named Thames Old Boys League Football Club from the Thames area on the Coromandel Peninsula from 1915 to 1920, though it is unclear if there was a connection between the two clubs. They had worn white, black, and blue and none of their players or official were mentioned in connection to the new Coromandel Old Boys club. On February 27 they published an advertisement in the Auckland Star requesting intending players and supporters to attend a meeting at the ABC Printing Works 116-120 Albert Street on Thursday, March 2 at 8pm with their honorary secretary being N.J. Armstrong.

=== 1922 season ===
Their first ever match was a preliminary season game against Point Chevalier on April 29 at Carlaw Park #2 field with Mr. Chapman refereeing. The result of the match was not reported. A week later on May 6 they played their first official competition match against Parnell again on the #2 field at Carlaw Park. The referee this time was L. Hemming however once more the score was not reported as was often the case for lower grade games in this era. Their next games were against City Rovers on May 13 at the Auckland Domain and Richmond Rovers on May 20 at their opponents ground at Grey Lynn.

On June 10 for their game against Kingsland Rovers at Kingsland their team list was published in the Auckland Star. It included the names: Wiles, Gatland (2), Hamilton, Senior, Breen, Carroll, Hewson, Morrinson, McVeigh, Legge, Wharfe, Nixon, Johns, and Gardener. They lost the match though no score was reported. Two more games followed against City Rovers A and B teams with the second at Walker Park in Point Chevalier.

Their first match to have a score reported was a 5–2 win over North Shore Albions who were known as “Devonport United” at this time following a merger with Sunnyside two years earlier. The game was played at the Auckland Domain #4 field at 2pm on July 15. Gatland scored their try with it converted by Park. Their last five matches of the season saw three heavy defeats to Ponsonby United on July 29 (2-38), Point Chevalier (0-37), and Richmond Rovers (0-25), with the scores against Newton Rangers and Ellerslie United not reported. With their last loss to Ellerslie they withdrew from the competition following round 14. With many results not reported across all sides it is unknown exactly where they finished but it would have most likely been near the bottom of the 11 team competition.

=== 1923 Season ===
In 1923 season saw Coromandel once again enter a side in the 3rd grade. They performed perhaps slightly better with two reported wins and three losses. They lost their first game of the season to Ellerslie 0–3. On May 19 their team list was published for their Victoria Park game with the Victoria Cruising Club. It was: Masters, Senior, Surtees, Legge, Foley, Wharfe, Breen, Wiles, Chapman, Gould, Bright, Fraser, Hamilton, Gatland (2), and Hudson with the side losing 8–2. Their first reported win was against Newton Rangers on June 16 though it was a default victory. A month later on July 28 they beat Parnell 5–3 at the Ellerslie Racecourse. McCarthy scored their try and Gould converting. Their final game of the year was a 33–0 loss to Ponsonby to finish midtable in the 14 team competition

=== 1924 Season ===
Once more Coromandel fielded a third grade side. As was the case from previous years most results were not reported. Their annual meeting was held on March 6 at the Trades Hall (Room D) at 8pm. Their honorary secretary was once more N.J. Armstrong. They played 11 games with a win and 2 losses their only scores stated in the newspapers. They opened the season with a match against Manukau Rovers on April 26 at Waikaraka Park in Onehunga. They played the same opponent a week later with their team list published: Miller, McCarthy, McGregor, Cross, Cole, Lye, Breen, Fraser, Chapman, Craig, Dixon, Lydon, Gatland, Gamble, Matindale, Otto, Hamilton. They won their third game with a 13–7 win over Ponsonby on May 10 at Māngere. They lost to Kingsland 0–3 on May 24 on the Outer Domain. Their other reported score for the year was a heavy 5–38 defeat to City who comfortably won the competition. Their last game of the year was a knockout competition loss to Athletic.

On June 27 they went on a semi regular excursion to the Coromandel. Their honorary secretary was R. Breen, one of their players.

=== 1925 final season ===
The 1925 season was to be Coromandel's final season in the Auckland Rugby League competition. They actually only survived 8 matches before dropping out. Their name was at times reported as being “Coromandel United” rather than Coromandel Old Boys. They held their annual meeting on March 5 at the League Rooms at Carlaw Park with N.J. Armstrong their honorary secretary however at their meeting on March 19 at McNeil's Billiard Rooms in Newton with all players requested to attend, R. Breen was listed as their new honorary secretary. Their first game of the season was against Point Chevalier on May 9. They lost 0–11 at their opponents Walker Park venue. The team list was: Jones, Lindsay, Leathart, Marshall, Galvan, McGregor, Lye, Buckley, Senior, Chapman, Fraser, Gould, Lydon, Cross, Cole, Blucher, Bishop, Masters, and Coll. They also lost to Otahuhu Rovers 5–10 on May 16, and then to New Lynn 0–6 on May 23 at New Lynn. They played other games against Athletic, Northcote & Birkenhead Ramblers, City, Richmond, and finally Kingsland on July 11 at Māngere. This was their last fixture before they withdrew from the competition and ceased to exist as a club failing to enter any teams in 1926.

== Playing records ==
The results are incomplete. The New Zealand Herald and Auckland Star published the fixture list each week with details, but results were only sent to the newspapers sporadically during the season, so these records have been compiled from the known results.

=== Third grade ===
Season	Pld	W	D	L	PF	PA	PD	Pts	Position (Teams)
1922	12	1	0	4	7	102	-95	2	Approximately 11th of 11
1923	11	2	0	3	7	47	-40	4	Approximately 9th of 14
1924	11	1	0	2	18	48	-30	2	Approximately 9th of 14
1925	8	0	0	3	5	27	-22	0	Approximately 17th of 17
Total	42	4	0	12	37	224	-187	8	
