= Victoria Cruising Club Rugby League Club =

Defunct New Zealand rugby league club, based in Auckland

Victoria Cruising Club League Football Club
Club information
- Full name: Victoria Cruising Club League Football Club
- Short name: Victoria Cruising Club
- Founded: 1923

Current details
- Ground(s): Victoria Park
- Competition: Auckland Rugby League

The Victoria Cruising Club Rugby League Club was a rugby league club in Auckland, New Zealand which existed for one season in 1923. They fielded one team which competed in the Auckland Rugby League 3rd grade. They were in fact a yachting club founded in 1903 which still exists and is based at the present day Westhaven Marina adjacent to the southern end of the Auckland Harbour Bridge.

== History ==
=== 1923 formation ===
Relatively little was reported on the club during their lone season in the Auckland Rugby League competition aside from their fixtures which were published weekly in the Auckland Star and New Zealand Herald. On April 30 they published a notice in the Auckland Star requesting members to meet for training that night (Monday) at Victoria Park. The notice was posted by their honorary secretary George Mobberley who was also the secretary of the yachting club. It is unknown what their colours were though the yachting clubs colours are red, black, and gold.

=== 1923 season ===
The Victoria Cruising Club played 11 matches in the 14 team 3rd grade competition. Only 4 of their results were actually reported, with 3 wins and 1 loss though other leading teams point totals were published later in the season indicating that Victoria lost at least 5 matches. The standings are incomplete but it is likely they finished mid table, well behind the leading teams with the grade won by Ponsonby United. Their first ever match was against Richmond Rovers on May 5 at their opponents Grey Lynn ground at 3pm and was refereed by Mr. J. Clark. Surprisingly Victoria won the match by default as Richmond were ultimately one of the stronger teams in the competition. However it was reported later that the Richmond club had defaulted all of their opening round lower grade matches in protest at the allocation of grounds. The Victoria Cruising Club's team for there opening match was published in the Auckland Star and was: Dodds, Sharp, Cawley/Cowley, Dunn, Archer, Roman, Daw, Bennett (2), Miller, Shannon, Clark, Riley, Barwell/Barnwell, and Clauson.

Their first match which was actually played was against the Parnell club on May 12 at 3pm on the Auckland Domain. The match was refereed by the experienced first grade and representative referee Frank Thompson. They won the match by 2 points to 0. They then beat Coromandel Old Boys at Victoria Park by 8 points to 2.

They then played City Rovers on May 26 with test referee Les Bull in charge at the Auckland Domain on the #1 field. The result of the match was not reported though from standings reported later in the season it is evident that they lost the game. They then played against North Shore Albions, known as Devonport United at this time following a merger with Sunnyside a few years earlier. The match was at Devonport on June 9. A week later they played Manukau Rovers at Manukau (Waikaraka Park). An notice was published in the newspaper requesting their players to meet at the corner of Hobson and Victoria Street at 1:45 for a bus to take them to the venue. They lost by 14 points to 3 with their team list published prior to the game. It was to be the last time that their team names were published and the side included: Manley, Sharp, Doonan, White, Sprott, Dords, Cawley, Clawson, Bennett, Shannon, Clark, Barwell, Dunn, Miller, Graydon, Hickson, and Hawks.

Their remaining matches were against Kingsland Rovers at Walker Park in Point Chevalier on June 23, Ponsonby United at Māngere on July 7, Ihumātao at the Ellerslie Racecourse on July 14, Point Chevalier at their ground on July 28, and then their last match against Richmond Rovers at Victoria Park on August 18. None of the results of these games was reported though it is likely they lost to Point Chevalier, Ponsonby, and Richmond. Kingsland and Ihumatao had both struggled with no known wins during the season so the Victoria side may have recorded victories in these games. The club did not meet again in a rugby league capacity and they fielded no teams in the 1924.

== Playing records ==
The results are incomplete. The New Zealand Herald and Auckland Star published the fixture list each week with details, but results were only sent to the newspapers sporadically during the season, so these records have been compiled from the known results.

=== Third grade ===
Season	Pld	W	D	L	PF	PA	PD	Pts	Position (Teams)
1923	11	3	0	5	13	16	-3	6	Approximately 8th of 14
