= Stan Webb (rugby league) =

NZ international rugby league player (1899-1971)

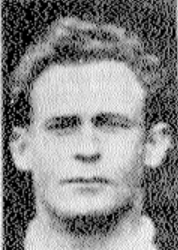

Personal information
- Full name: Stanley George Webb
- Born: 28 November 1899 New Zealand
- Died: 6 September 1971 (aged 71) Auckland, New Zealand

Playing information
- Height: 178 cm (5 ft 10 in)
- Weight: 73 kg (11 st 7 lb)
- Position: Centre, Halfback, Fullback
Club
Years	Team	Pld	T	G	FG	P
1922–28	North Shore Albions	73	29	8	0	103
1930	Ellerslie	13	2	1	0	8
1931	Ellerslie-Otahuhu	11	3	4	0	17
	Total	97	34	13	0	128
Representative
Years	Team	Pld	T	G	FG	P
1922–27	Auckland	10	7	1	0	21
1925–26	Auckland A	2	0	0	0	0
1925–26	New Zealand	15	5	0	0	15
1926	New Zealand Probables	1	1 (obstr. try)	0	0	3
1927	New Zealand XIII	1	0	0	0	0
- As of 28 April 2021

Stanley George Webb was a New Zealand international rugby league player who represented them 15 times in 1925 and 1926. Webb was the 177th player to represent New Zealand. He also played 10 matches for Auckland from 1922 to 1927. Webb played club rugby league for Devonport United for 7 seasons, 1 season for Ellerslie and 1 season for a combined Ellerslie-Otahuhu senior side.

== Early life and family ==
Stanley Webb was born on 28 November 1899. His mother was Agnes Webb (née McDonald) and his father was George Webb. His parents had married on 10 April 1893. He had 7 siblings; Norina Gladys Haydon (née Webb) (b.1893-1966), Clarence Christopher (b.1897-1968), Doris Thelma Eugene (b.1901-1979), Hilda Alexandra Jaggs (née Webb) (b.1903), Marjorie Jean (b.1905-1984), Donald (b.1910-1979), and Molly Isabel Lorraine (b.1914-1916). The family was living at 19 Stanley Street (Stanley Point Road) in Devonport when Stan's brother Clarence enlisted in World War I in 1918.

== Playing career ==
=== North Shore Albions and Auckland debuts ===
In 1918 Webb was playing in the fifth grade for the North Shore Albions club on the North Shore of Auckland. By the 1922 season Webb had progressed to the First Juniors team at the club, which was now known as Devonport United after a merger with the Sunnyside club in 1920. His brother Clarence was playing for the senior side and early in the season Stanley was promoted to join him in the top side. He debut was likely in a 18–7 win over the Fire Brigade side. During the season he played 13 matches for Devonport, scoring an impressive 11 tries which made him the 4th highest try scorer in senior competition matches. He combined with his brother for several of his tries but Clarence was dropped to a lower grade team mid season and broke his leg in a match at Māngere and was hospitalised.

In late July he was selected in the reserves for the Auckland side to play Cambridge. However he did take the field and kicked a conversion in a 73-29 thrashing of Cambridge at Carlaw Park. Later in the season on 2 September, Webb again played for Auckland, this time against South Auckland at Carlaw Park. The match was for the Northern Union Challenge Cup and the visitors upset Auckland 21–20 to claim the trophy. Webb had begun the match in the three quarters but was replaced by George Yardley at halftime.

In 1923 Stan played 14 matches for Devonport and scored 5 tries and kicked 5 conversions. They finished mid table in the first grade championship and were knocked out in the semi-finals of the Roope Rooster competition by City Rovers. A week later on 15 September he played his only representative match of the season for Auckland against South Auckland. The match was for the Northern Union Challenge Cup and the match was drawn 20–20 at Steele Park in Hamilton with Webb scoring 1 try.

The 1924 season saw Webb “out of town” to begin the year. He had returned to Auckland weeks later and made his first appearance in a 2–2 draw against City Rovers in a round 3 match on 10 May. he ultimately played 13 matches for Devonport and scored 4 tries and kicked 1 conversion. After 17 rounds of the first grade championship Marist Old Boys trailed Devonport by 2 competition points. Marist had played one less match and so the Auckland Rugby League scheduled a final between the two sides to decide the championship. An enormous crowd of 17,000, believed to be a club record at the time was on hand at Carlaw Park to see Marist win 20–17. Marist won with a try in the last minute to Malloy with Jack Kirwan debuting for them. Earlier in the game Webb put Bert Laing away from a scrum and a try for Harper eventuated to give Devonport a 7–5 lead. In the second half Webb was involved in a break with Douglas and Laing with Laing scoring putting Devonport out to a 17–12 lead. Devonport had a revenge of sorts when they knocked Marist out of the Roope Rooster competition a week later with a 5-3 round 2 win however they then lost their semi final match with Ponsonby United 14–10 to end their season.

=== New Zealand selection for tour of Australia ===
Webb began the year playing for Devonport once more and he played 8 matches, scoring 4 tries and kicking 1 conversion. Then following a trial match for Auckland A against Auckland B which was lost 5-0 Webb was picked as one of the halfbacks for the New Zealand tour of Australia. The Auckland Star was somewhat unflattering with their comments on his selection. They said he “may not be the big success many believe. He will work hard and shirk nothing, but, as remarked elsewhere, Auckland has no really brilliant half-backs, and Webb has found a place in a weak year”. Prior to their departure the Devonport club held a “social and dance” in Webb, Bert Laing, and Horace Dixon’s honour (the other selected members from the club). Webb’s debut for New Zealand actually came prior to the team’s departure for Australia. A match was arranged at Carlaw Park between Auckland and the New Zealand side. Webb scored a try in a 16-9 win for New Zealand. His try came from a scrum near the Auckland line where he dived over in the corner which had given New Zealand a 8-3 lead.

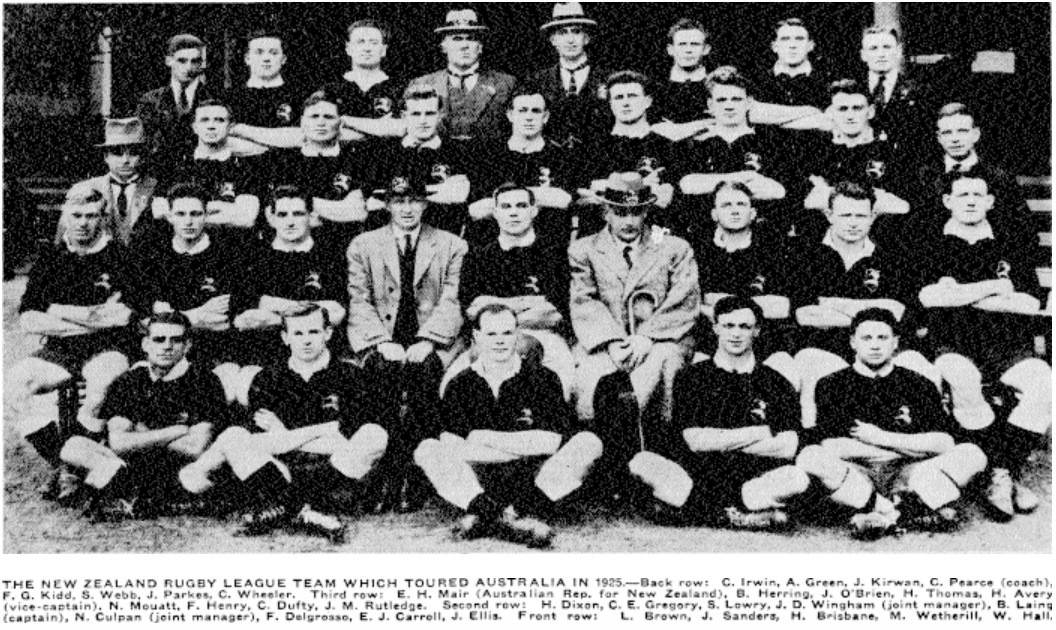
New Zealand team to tour Australia in 1925. Stan Webb is 3rd from the right in the back row.

New Zealand departed for Sydney on 3 July on board the Moeraki. Webb made 6 appearances on the tour with 5 at halfback and 1 against New South Wales late in the tour at centre. He played in the opening match of the tour against New South Wales on 11 July at the Sydney Cricket Ground. New Zealand lost before a crowd of 24,000 by 7 points to 4. Webb was playing alongside his Devonport clubmate Bert Laing who was captaining the side in the standoff position. New Zealand were said to be the better side but wasted several scoring chances through poor handling. It was said surprisingly that Laing and Webb “had no understanding” with each other with Laing's handling being slow and bad. Webb “still has the old mode of putting the ball in the scrum, throwing downward. The recognised style here now… is for the ball to be slung in almost horizontally or delivered at least lower than the knee”. Webb then played against the Australian Universities side at the Sydney Sports Ground before 2,500 spectators. New Zealand lost 15–13 with Webb scoring New Zealand's last try which failed to be converted by Craddock Dufty thus costing New Zealand a chance of a draw. Earlier he had sent a smart pass to Maurice Wetherill who scored New Zealand's first try which was converted by Neil Mouat to give New Zealand a 5–0 lead. Webb was replaced at halfback for the 3rd tour match against Newcastle by Wilson Hall with The New Zealand Herald reporting “Webb played a fine game at halfback against New South Wales, and it is hard to understand why Wilson-Hall is selected instead of him”. Webb missed selection for 2 further matches against New South Wales before returning to the side for their 6th tour match against Far North Coast on 29 July. The match was played in Lismore before 5,000 spectators. New Zealand won 21–20. He was said to be “smart at clearing the ball from the scrums”. On 5 August he played against Ipswich on North Ipswich Reserve with New Zealand losing 22–21. He helped set up a try for Frank Henry when he passed the ball to him ten yards out and he crossed for a try which Craddock Dufty converted to narrow the score to 14–13 to Ipswich. The Brisbane Courier reported that Webb “is a new player, who is very tricky and speedy” and that he was “the finest of the inside backs. He was always dangerous, and took slices out of the defence by pace and trickiness when he was given the slightest chance”. Webb was not selected for the next 2 matches but was chosen to play centre against New South Wales on 15 August. New Zealand won the match 19–18 at the Sydney Cricket Ground before 16,000 spectators. In the first half Wetherill was playing behind the scrum but in the second Webb moved into the half back position. He scored New Zealand's final try after Mouatt passed to him during “loose play” and Webb “scored easily”. The try was converted by Mouatt giving New Zealand a 19–13 lead which they hung on to. In the final match of the tour Webb moved back into the half back position for New Zealand's 26–25 loss to the Southern Division at Fisher Park in Cootamundra. New Zealand had travelled 253 miles over night by train to reach the venue. New Zealand was on the wrong end of a 28-3 penalty count with several of the Southern Division's points coming from penalty shots at goal. Webb crossed for a try in the second half after gathering the ball and “dummied several opponents, and scored near the posts”. After the conversion New Zealand led 25 to 12.

Following the teams return to New Zealand Webb played in the Auckland sides 18–18 draw with the touring Queensland side. Webb scored a try after “whipping up the ball [and] struggled over the line” to make the score 8–5 to Queensland. During the second half Webb moved to the centre position with Frank Delgrosso shifting to half back. Webb then played for New Zealand against Queensland on 12 September before 14,000 at Carlaw Park. New Zealand was soundly beaten 35-14 though Webb was said to have played well and was involved in several attacking incidents.

=== 1926-27 New Zealand tour of England and Wales ===
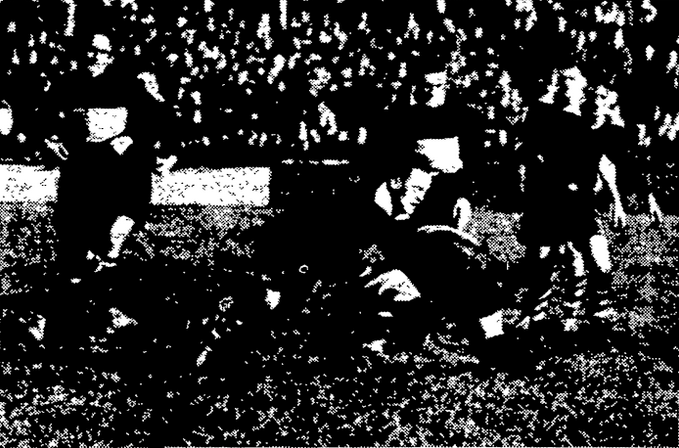
Webb making a tackle in a June 20 match against Ponsonby.

Webb began the 1926 season playing for Devonport once more however in his very first game of the season against Ponsonby United he badly injured his ankle and couldn't play for 3 weeks.

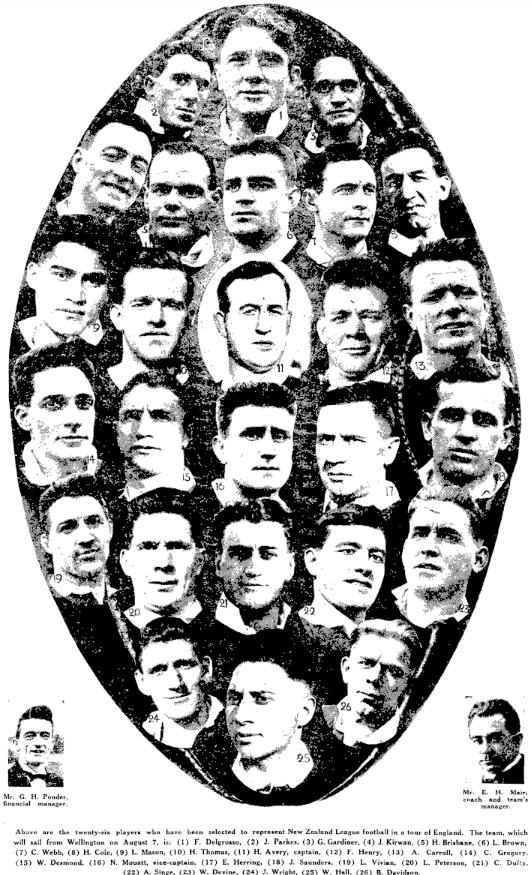
The NZ team to tour England and Wales with Stan Webb, second row from the top, second on the right (7).

He returned to the field on 5 June in a match against City Rovers. Near the end of the month he was selected for an Auckland trial match between A and B teams which was a curtain-raiser to the North Island – South Island match. His Auckland B team won 25–16. 4 days later he played for Auckland against the Rest of New Zealand. The Rest of New Zealand won 28–21 with Webb scoring a try for Auckland. After this match the New Zealand selectors named him in the touring side for England and Wales in the five-eighths position along with Jack Kirwan, Hec Brisbane, and Hector Cole. It was said after the trial matches that he and Kirwan had “played themselves into the team by consistent good work of a solo nature”. Webb played one more match for Devonport against Marist on 24 July before being chosen in the New Zealand side to play Auckland on 31 July prior to their departure. The game was very loose with New Zealand not taking it very seriously and they lost 52–32.

On 3 August the New Zealand team departed on board the Aorangi with 3,000 there to send them off. They travelled to Suva, Fiji where an exhibition match was played before moving on to Hawaii and then Vancouver where they crossed North America by train before travelling by sea to England. Upon arriving in England the team played Dewsbury however Webb was not picked for this match. In fact he didn't make his debut appearance on the tour until their 8th game against York on 5 October. New Zealand won the match 19-11 before a crowd of 3,100 with Webb playing at five eighth to begin with, with Wilson Hall at half back. It was said that Gregory, Webb, Avery and Henry “were the best of the visitors”. He was reported to have moved to second five eighth “and his side stepping and straight, penetrating runs had the York backs thinking furiously”. Then a short time later he threw a pass to Jim Parkes who would have been in for a try but the pass was ruled forward. Late in the first half Kirwan moved to second five eighth and Webb moved to five eighth due to an injury elsewhere in the side. In the second half Webb secured the ball from a scrum and passed to Parkes who sent the ball on to Kirwan who scored a “brilliant” try which after the conversion gave New Zealand a 12–6 lead. With the lead 17-11 Kirwan moved to the wing due to an injury to him and Sanders moved to five eighth and Webb was pushed out into the centres. New Zealand added a penalty before the match ended. He then played in the following match against Warrington on 9 October. New Zealand lost the match 17–5 with Webb moving into the half back position and Ben Davidson playing at five eighth. The match was played in heavy rain and gale-force winds and Davidson was injured early in the match, leaving the field and not returning until near halftime. He “was virtually a passenger for the remainder of the game”. J O’Shaunessey who was travelling with the team said of Webb that he “is new to the position of half, and has not played there before on the tour, was not impressive. But it must be said he did not see much of the ball”. The Daily News in London gave a fairly brutal assessment when it said that the New Zealand team was “distinctly third rate”, and that “Cole and Webb are negligible in defence and ineffective in attack. In the middle stages of the tour a large ruction occurred in the squad between 7 forwards and the coach Ernest Mair. The players went on strike until it was decided by the English Rugby League that Mair should stand down for a month. The striking players then began taking the field again. Webb played halfback against Wigan Highfield when six of these seven players were in the starting side. The match took place on 17 November and New Zealand won 14–2. Webb had moved into the half back position due to Wilson Hall breaking his arm in the match with Huddersfield on 6 November. Frank Delgrosso had gone on tour as an understudy but it was thought he was more suited to the three quarters position. Webb played half back again in the next tour match against Batley. New Zealand lost 19–17 in atrocious conditions with heavy rain and a wet ground. Webb was said to have been dangerous when in possession along with Ben Davidson, and Lou Brown.

Webb didn't play again until the 9 December match with St Helen's which New Zealand lost 22–12 in drizzly rain. New Zealand was said to have played well with both sides scoring 4 tries however goal kicking was the difference. Webb played at first five eighth outside Hec Brisbane. George Gardiner who had been playing outside Webb was sensationally sent off after he disputed a line umpire's call for Alf Ellaby's try. The line umpire racially abused Gardiner who then struck the line umpire leading to his dismissal. Webb played in the next match which was a heavy 36–15 defeat to Wigan however Charles Gregory and Jack Kirwan both left the field injured with an injured knee and head injuries respectively leaving New Zealand with just 11 players before Webb was also injured and became something of a spectator. The match see-sawed early with teams exchanging tries before Webb “took a good pass from Davidson, beat the Wigan defence, and again crossed the line” tying the scores at 12 each. This was to be Webb's only points of the tour. Webb was said to have been “tackled hard when going for a try, and although he struggled on and played the game through, he was of little use to his side. He had to be carried to the station with a knee injury, and is likely to be laid up for some time”. Webb took no further part in the tour and returned to New Zealand after their final game which was on 15 January.

=== Return to Devonport and Auckland sides ===
At the Devonport United annual meeting on 16 March Stan Webb was elected to the committee. When looking at Devonport's prospects for the season in a 6 April New Zealand Herald article it was stated that when in England Webb “received a leg injury which still causes trouble, but it is stated that he intends to play at full-back”. On 30 April he played for a New Zealand XIII consisting of the returning Auckland members of the New Zealand team which had toured England and Wales. They played against Auckland at Carlaw Park and were defeated 24-21 before 14,000 spectators.

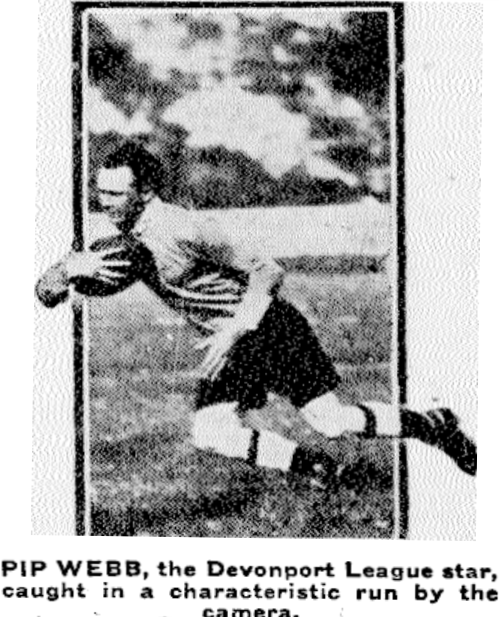
Webb playing for Auckland.

Webb then played 11 matches for Devonport scoring 3 tries. After three rounds it was said that he had been “showing excellent form, and is also an improved player as a result of going on the tour”. Two weeks later he moved back into the half back position.

In early September Webb was selected for Auckland's four game ‘Southern Tour’ of Canterbury the West Coast, Otago, and Wellington. Webb played in three of the matches and scored a try in each. The first match was against Canterbury and Auckland won 24–13 at Monica Park in Christchurch. His try came after he was involved in a passing move with Lou Hutt and Horace Dixon that gave Auckland an 11–10 lead. He didn't play against the West Coast on 14 September which Auckland won 42-15 but was included in the side to play Otago on 17 September. The match was played on the Caledonian Ground in Dunedin and saw Auckland win 20-13 before a crowd of 2,000. Webb scored Auckland's last try after a kick bounced away from Oliver of Otago and Webb grounded it with Craddock Dufty converting. The team then travelled to Wellington. They played Wellington at Newtown Park and won 41 to 23.

Auckland then returned home. Webb played for them again against Buller at Carlaw Park on 8 October. There were 7,000 spectators on hand to see Auckland thrash them 60–33 with Webb again scoring a try. He then played halfback once more in Auckland's final match of the season against South Auckland. The match was for the Northern Union Challenge Cup and saw Auckland upset 29-12 by the visitors.

In 1928 Webb was out of Auckland to begin the season but was intending to play. He didn't in fact make his first appearance until Devonport's round 6 match with Ponsonby United which they won 21–19. He played in 9 matches and scored 2 tries. Devonport won first grade championship for just the third time in their history to this point and their first time in 14 seasons when they last won in 1914. Webb scored a try in their final round win over Ellerslie which secured the title. He then played in Devonport's Roope Rooster semi final loss to Marist Old Boys and a Stormont Shield final loss to the same opponent. These two matches would ultimately turn out to be his last ever appearances for Devonport as he ‘retired’ at the end of the season.

=== Retirement, and return to Auckland for Ellerslie United ===
Devonport reported that Webb would “view the game from the bank in future”. On 9 May the Otago Daily Times reported that Webb was moving to Dunedin and would probably represent the City club there however he did not play any rugby league in 1929. Then in 1930 prior to the start of the season it was reported that he would be turning out for Ellerslie United. He played in their opening match with City Rovers and the match was drawn 12-12. He joined Craddock Dufty and Wally Somers in the Ellerslie side. There was a good deal of controversy surrounding the match as Dufty was sent off after disputing a try to Ben Davidson at the end of the match which leveled the scores. City came in for some criticism after the match as they protested the playing of Webb who they believed didn't have a clearance to play for Ellerslie.

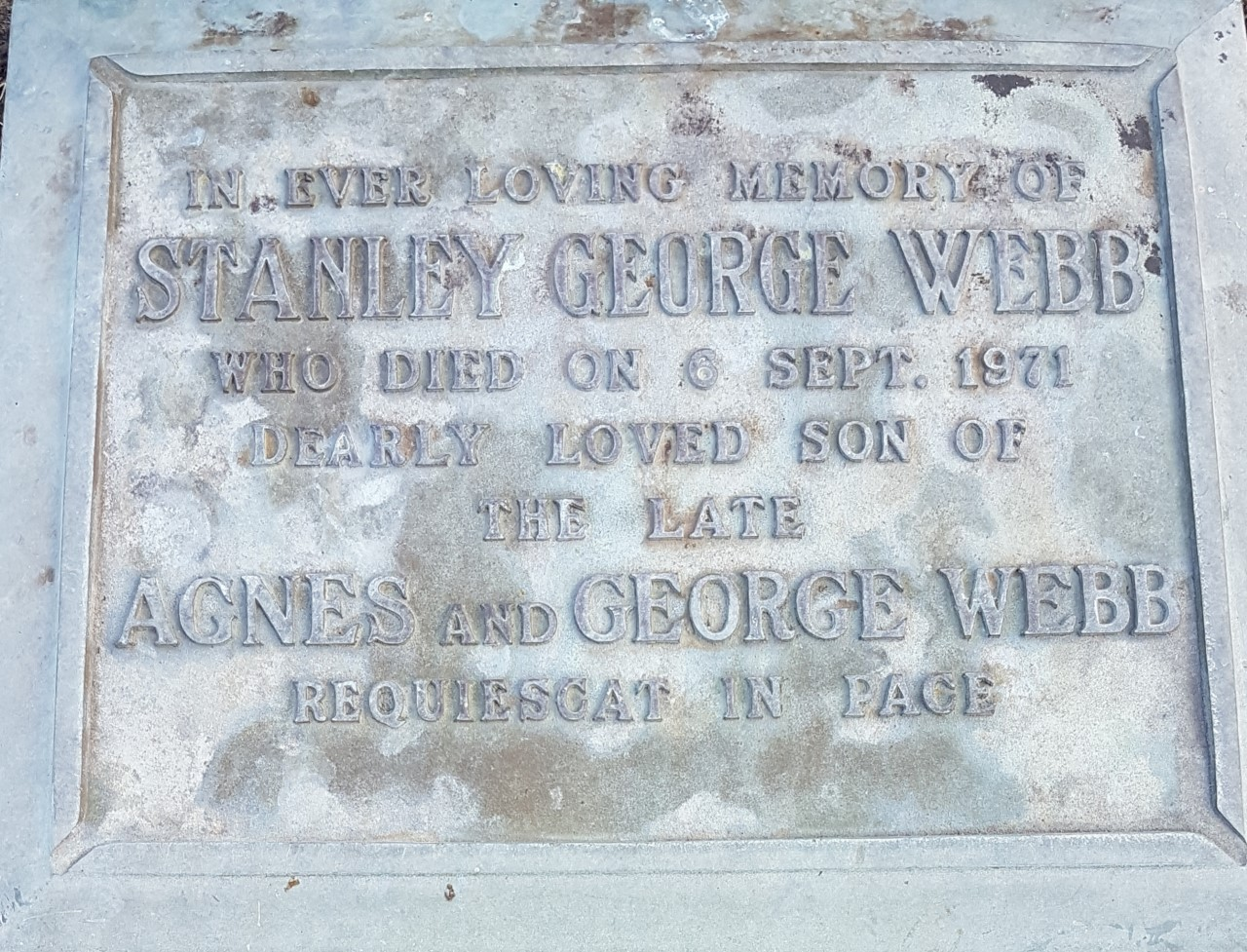
Stan Webb's gravestone at the Birkenhead-Glenfield Cemetery.

It was considered ironic as City didn't have clearance to play Davidson but fielded him in the hope that his clearance would be granted belatedly. Davidson had returned from England where he had been playing for Wigan.

Webb ultimately played 14 matches for Ellerslie and scored 2 tries and kicked a conversion. They struggled during the season but managed 4 wins and a draw to come 7th out of 8 teams in first grade.

The 1931 season saw Ellerslie, Otahuhu and Māngere United combine to form a senior team. During the season Māngere fought to remove themselves from the combined side essentially meaning it was a combined Ellerslie-Otahuhu side. Webb played 13 matches for the side and scored 4 tries and kicked 4 penalties. Ellerslie-Otahuhu struggled in the first grade competition winning just 1 game and drawing another to finish last. They were then knocked out in the first round by Richmond Rovers 15–11. The 4 penalties Webb kicked all came in his final ever game of rugby league against Richmond.

Webb then retired from playing at the end of the 1931 season.

== Personal life and death ==
In 1933 Webb married Kathleen Eagon Hendry, however they were divorced 11 years later in 1944. She had left him some time earlier and Stan petitioned the court for her return but the court ruled in Kathleens favour on June 6 and they divorced after that point. They had no children. She departed New Zealand at the end of World War 2 and married American soldier DeWitt L. Bolton. She died in Hannibal, Missouri in 1961.

On 26 August 1939 a Stanley George Webb was reported in the Auckland Star as seeing a woman's body floating in the Waitematā Harbour near Queen's Wharf by the Auckland Ferry Terminal. The woman (Rose Hannah Nennis) was taken from the water to Auckland Hospital but died the next day. He was reported as being a crane driver employed by the Auckland Harbour Board. His nephew Desmond John Haydon (son of his sister Norina) was killed in action during World War II on 28 June 1942.

He died on 6 September 1971 and was buried at the Birkenhead-Glenfield Cemetery.
