= Clarrie Polson =

New Zealand rugby league player

Personal information
- Full name: Clarence Percival Polson
- Born: 27 July 1900 New Zealand
- Died: 7 February 1970 (aged 69) New Zealand

Playing information

Rugby union
Club
Years	Team	Pld	T	G	FG	P
1919	Ponsonby RFC	12	3	0	0	9
Representative
Years	Team	Pld	T	G	FG	P
1919	Auckland Juniors	1	0	0	0	0
1919	Auckland	3	1	0	0	3
1919	Auckland B	2	0	0	0	0

Rugby league
- Position: Scrum-half
Club
Years	Team	Pld	T	G	FG	P
1920–28	Newton Rangers (ARL)	72	20	41	0	144
Representative
Years	Team	Pld	T	G	FG	P
1920–25	Auckland	18	8	18	0	59
1920–24	New Zealand	9 (4)	0	1	0	2
1925	Auckland C	1	0	1	0	2

Clarence Percival "Clarrie" Polson was a New Zealand rugby league player who represented New Zealand. He debuted for New Zealand in 1920 and became Kiwi number 143.

== Personal life ==
Clarrie Polson was born Clarence Percival Polson on 27 July 1900. His parents were Catherine (Kate) Polson (1860–1938), and Ole (Oliver) Polson (1856–1915). Catherine had been born in Ireland. He was the youngest of 11 children. His siblings were Mary Ann (b. 1880), John (b. 1882), Maggie (1884), Eliza Jane (b. 1886), Dennis Oliver (b. 1888), Andrew (b. 1890), Eric (b. 1892), Arthur Paul (b. 1894), Annie (b. 1896), and Amelia Gertrude (1899).

His brother John was killed in action in 1917 during World War I.

Clarrie's brother Dennis Oliver Polson who also spent 3 years fighting in World War I was also involved in rugby league and was the honorary secretary of the Ponsonby United club in the 1920s before his death in 1932.

== Playing career ==
=== Rugby union with Ponsonby and Auckland representative team ===
Clarrie Polson began playing senior rugby for Ponsonby in the Auckland club competition in 1919 in May, 2 months before his 19th birthday. He played 12 matches for them during the season, scoring 3 tries. On 5 July he played for the Auckland Junior team against a combined College representative side. Then on 19 July he played in the Auckland team against a Returned Soldiers side. This was somewhat of an unofficial Auckland appearance as the Returned Soldier side featured Auckland representative players who would have been in the Auckland team otherwise. He was then picked as a reserve for the Auckland team in their August 16match with Thames but did not take the field. In September he played twice for Auckland B in matches with Waihi and Hamilton. Polson was again picked in the reserves for the Auckland side against Bay of Plenty but did not take the field in the 27 September match. He then made an official Auckland debut in a match against Thames on 4 October which was won by Auckland 17-0. Two weeks later he played again for Auckland against the New Zealand Army side on 18 October. Auckland lost the match 16-6 with Polson being said to have put in "a lot of good defensive work".

=== Switch to rugby league, Newton Rangers and Auckland ===
Polson played in the Auckland Rugby League competition at Scrum-half for the Newton Rangers. He played 7 seasons for them from 1920 to 1926 and made 83 appearances for them scoring 22 tries, and kicking 43 goals.

In his first season of rugby league he was selected in the Auckland team to play the touring England side. Auckland pulled off a huge 24-16 upset win with Polson playing halfback in the match at the Auckland Domain in front of an estimated 30,000 spectators.

The 1922 season saw him play 8 matches for Auckland. The first was against New Zealand Maori where he scored a try in a 28-18 loss against a Maori side which was about to embark on a tour of Australia. He then played in 2 matches against the touring Australian Universities side on 21 and 24 June. Auckland lost both matches 13-12 and 18-7. The first match was played at Carlaw Park while the second was played at the Auckland Domain. The Australian University side was made up of players from Sydney University and Brisbane University.

Polson then played in a match against Cambridge which Auckland won easily by 73 points to 29 with Polson kicking 2 conversions. Later in the season he played against South Auckland in a Northern Union Challenge Cup match. Auckland were upset 21-20 although the South Auckland team did feature several New Zealand players. Polson scored a try for Auckland. Two weeks later he played for Auckland against the touring New South Wales side in a 40-25 defeat in front of 20,000 spectators at the Auckland Domain. His final two matches of the representative season were against South Auckland and Bay of Plenty. The match with South Auckland was for the Northern Union Challenge Cup which Auckland failed to win back, going down 26-18 at Steele Park in Hamilton with Polson kicking 1 conversion. They then beat Bay of Plenty 33-26 at Tauranga. Bay of Plenty featured New Zealand players George Iles and George Gardiner. Polson scored a try and kicked 2 conversions.

In 1923 Polson played 5 matches for Auckland. On 22 August he was at his usual position of halfback against Wellington. Auckland trounced Wellington 71-12 in front of 5,000 spectators at Carlaw Park. Polson converted 3 of Auckland's 17 tries though Auckland used at least 6 goal kickers. On 12 September Auckland played Hamilton and won 22-16 with Polson scoring 2 tries and kicking a conversion.

Auckland then took on South Auckland in an effort to regain the Northern Union Challenge Cup in Hamilton. The match was drawn 20-20 which meant the South Auckland side retained it. Polson kicked 2 conversions for Auckland. Polson then played for Auckland against the Auckland Province side which was made up of Auckland 'city' players but also players from the wide region. Auckland won 44 to 15 with Polson again in the points with 1 try and 2 conversions. His final representative match of the 1923 season was against South Auckland though as the match was at Carlaw Park in Auckland it was not for the Northern Union Challenge Cup. Auckland won comfortably by 35 points to 11 in front of 6,000 spectators with Polson scoring a try and kicking 3 conversions.

In 1924 Polson made 3 more appearances for Auckland. The first 2 were a mirror of 1922 when he played 2 matches against a touring Australian University side. On 7 June he was part of the side which won 15-7 which he was also in the victorious side which won on 4 June by 14 points to 4. He scored a try in the latter match but he collided badly with team mate George Davidson who had to leave the field to be replaced by Frank Delgrosso. Polson received a bad cut over his eye and later left the field to be replaced by Billy Ghent. At the end of the season Polson played against South Auckland in a 21-5 win at Steele Park in Hamilton.

The 1925 season would be the last where Polson played representative rugby league. On 27 June he scored a try for an Auckland C team in a match with South Auckland. On the same day the North Island played the South island, while Auckland A played Auckland B. All 3 matches were played at Carlaw Park and were played in order to assist the New Zealand selectors who were trying to pick the New Zealand side to tour Australia. South Auckland won 13-11 with Polson kicking a conversion for the losing Auckland side. His final ever match for the full Auckland side was against South Auckland in a Northern Union Challenge Cup clash. Auckland won 24-16 at Carlaw Park with 3,000 spectators in attendance. Polson kicked 2 conversions for Auckland.

=== New Zealand selection ===
Clarrie Polson was selected for New Zealand against England for the second and third tests of the 1920 tour which was remarkable considering he had only begun playing senior football the year prior and not even in the rugby league code. He had turned 20 only a month prior to the match. New Zealand lost 19-3 at Lancaster Park in Christchurch before a crowd of 6,000. The match was played in heavy rain and parts of the field were underwater. At one point early in the game the diminutive halfback "sat on the ball to stop a rush, and was pushed about ten yards along the ground and over the goal line" "in a sitting position, right over, and he forced".

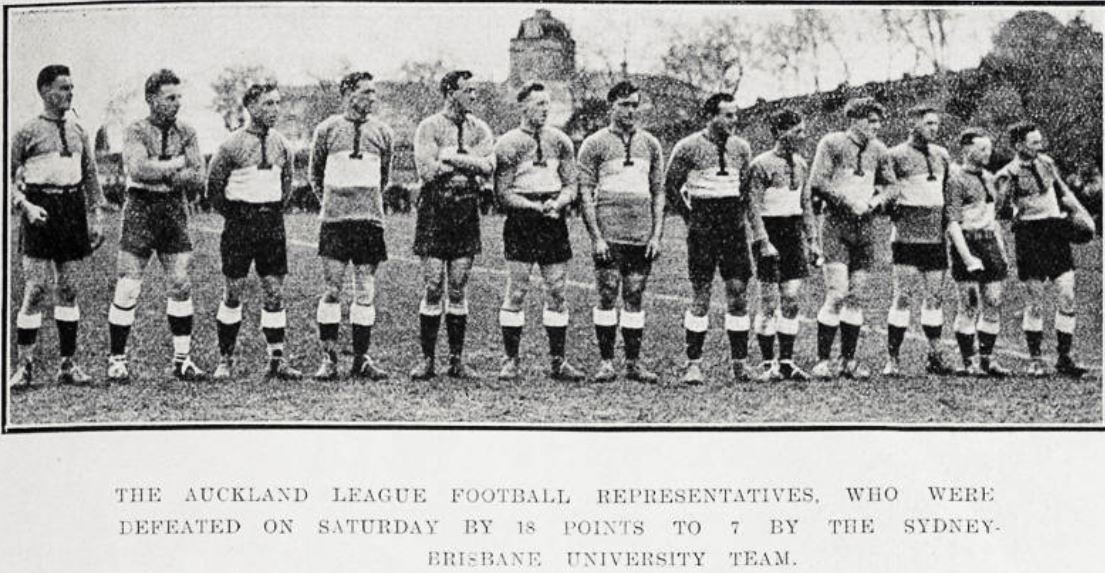
Polson 2nd from the right in the Auckland team to play the 2nd match against the Australian Universities side at the Auckland Domain on 24 June 1922.

Polson's second match for New Zealand came in the third test of the series which was played at the Basin Reserve with 5,000 present. It had rained for three days prior and the field was described as a quagmire as it cut up during the match. New Zealand went down by a point, 11-10. Polson was involved in a passing movement with Thomas McClymont, Jim Sanders, Charles Woolley, and Karl Ifwersen with the latter scoring New Zealand's second try which pushed New Zealand's lead out to 10-0 before England came back. Polson was said to have been "very prominent in stopping rushes" as the game became more strenuous however it was not enough to stop England scoring a converted try with three minutes to go to claim the win.

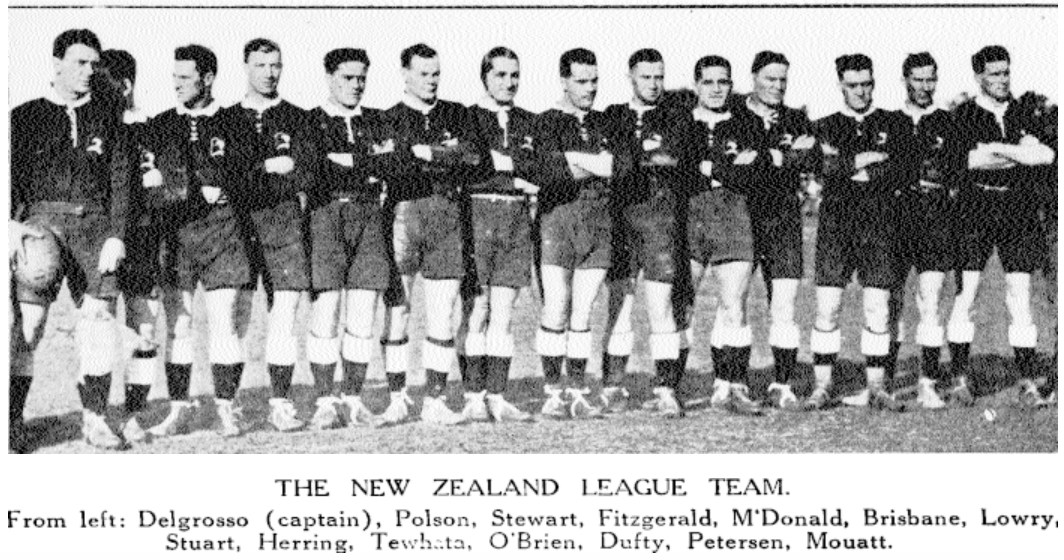

In 1921 Polson was picked in the New Zealand team to tour Australia under coach Jim Rukutai, although the team played in no Test matches. He played in 5 of the tour matches. The first was against New South Wales on 4 June at the Sydney Cricket Ground. New Zealand was thrashed by New South Wales 56-9 in front of a huge crowd of 50,000. Polson next played against Queensland also at the Sydney Cricket Ground and this time New Zealand performed much better winning the match 25-12 before 35,000 spectators. He played Queensland again on 11 June though this time the match was in Brisbane and Queensland turned the tables with a 21-16 win. Polson fielded a kick in his own 25 and passed to Charles Woolley who gave to Billy Wilson who went the rest of the way to score and give New Zealand an 8-3 lead. Then late in the match Polson made a break up to halfway before New Zealand worked their way to Queenslands line and Wally Somers crossed to narrow the score to 21-16 which it remained. Polson played Queensland for the third time on 18 June with the local team again winning 8-3. Polson then missed 3 matches before appearing again in the final match of the tour against Newcastle on 2 July. His only points of the tour were in this game when he kicked a conversion in a 27-14 win at the Newcastle Showgrounds. Polson was involved in a movement with Thomas McClymont which resulted in George Paki scoring to make the lead 22-14. Polson's conversion of Wally Somers try were the last points of the match and the tour.

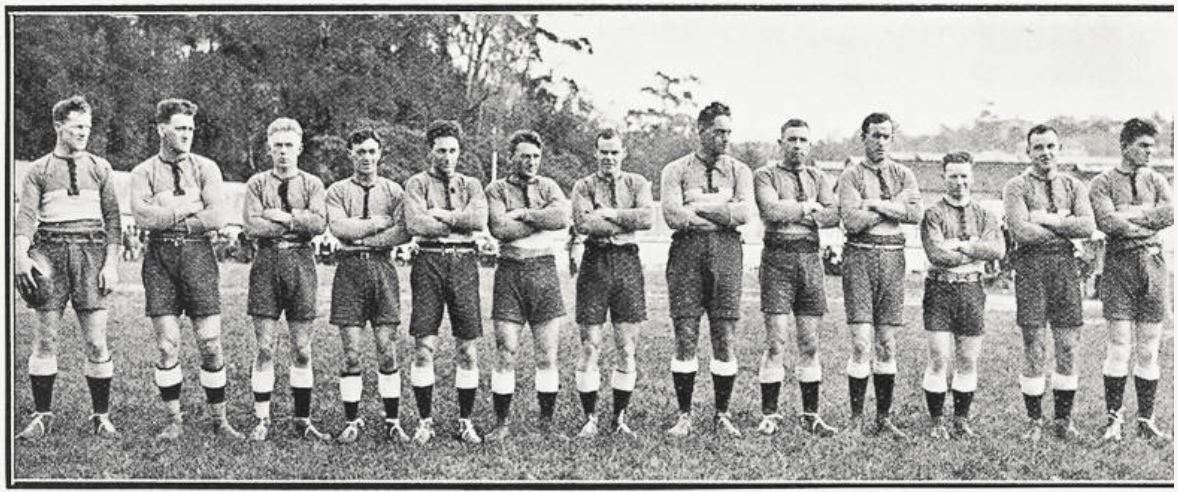
Polson, 3rd from the right in the Auckland team to play England on 26 July 1924 at Carlaw Park.

Polson's next appearance in the New Zealand jersey was in the second test against England on 6 August 1924 at the Basin Reserve. The match was played on "a heavy ground" with "a cold southerly of gale force". New Zealand trailed 11-0 at halftime before a comeback and converted try on full time saw them snatch victory 13-11. Polson's final ever match for New Zealand was in the third test in Dunedin which New Zealand lost 31-18, though they had already secured the series by this point after their first test win. Polson had a hand in New Zealand's first try after putting Hec Brisbane through with Frank Delgrosso fielding a loose pass to score.

== Personal life and death ==
Clarence married Winifred Violet Sweet (1906-) on 16 February 1927. Winifred had been born in South Petherton, Somerset, in England. On 6 August 1938 Clarrie's mother, Catherine, died in Auckland. Clarrie lived in Grey Lynn in the 1960s according to census records. He died in 1970 aged 69.
