= Ihumātao Rugby League Club =

Defunct New Zealand rugby league club, based in Auckland

Club information
- Full name: Ihumātao Rugby League Club
- Short name: Ihumātao
- Founded: 1922
- Exited: 1923

Former details
- Ground(s): Mangere; Mangere Trotting Ground
- Competition: Auckland Rugby League

The Ihumātao Rugby League Club was a rugby league club in Auckland, New Zealand which existed from 1922 to 1923. They competed in the Auckland Rugby League 2nd grade competition in each season and had a third grade side in 1923. They represented the Ihumātao area in the Māngere suburb in Auckland.

== History ==
=== 1922 formation ===
Very little was reported on the club during their two seasons in the Auckland Rugby League competition aside from their fixtures which were published weekly in the Auckland Star and New Zealand Herald. On April 4, 1922, the Auckland Rugby League management committee held their weekly meeting and reported that they had accepted the application of a new club called the “Central Mangere Club”, and they would enter a team in the second grade. The team was however exclusively named “Ihumata” for their existence and were ostensibly a Māori football side. It was a misspelling of their area's Māori name and was corrected at a later date. Over the same period another Māori team existed in the area and was originally named “Mangere Rangers” (1915-1923) before later changing to Māngere United League Football Club in 1924.

=== 1922 season ===
The Ihumatao clubs first ever game was against North Shore Albions who at this time were named Devonport United following a merger with Sunnyside two years earlier. The match was played at the Auckland Domain on May 6 on the #2 field at 3pm with H Clayton refereeing. They had a bye the following week before playing their second match as the Domain, again on the #2 field, this time against City Rovers on May 20. They lost by 14 points to 0 to the eventual champions. Their 3rd game was against Otahuhu Rovers on June 10 at their home area of Māngere. The result of the match was not reported. They then had matches against Northcote & Birkenhead at the Auckland Domain, Otahuhu at Otahuhu, and Manukau Rovers at the Mangere Trotting Ground. None of these results were reported.

On July 10 as part of the Auckland Winter Show's festivities several teams competed in events, including the Tug-of-War. The New Zealand Herald wrote “the great attractions during the evening were the tug-of-war competitions. There were three teams left in the finals, these being Marist Brothers’ League Football, Tramways, and the Ihumata Maori Football. Marist Brothers and Tramways pulled off for the first prize, the former proving victorious after a good struggle. The Maori team then pulled Tramways for second prize, and were defeated. Their first reported win on the rugby league field came in their next match, against Richmond Rovers at the Mangere Trotting Ground on July 22 at 3pm. The Auckland Star gave their try scorers as Paul (2 tries), and Wilson junior. Both of these players would go on to play for the Māngere United side in the senior grade from 1924 onwards. Over the coming weeks they had a 37–9 win against Ponsonby United in a game at Mangere on July 29, and a win against their neighbouring Māngere side by 18 points to 8 on August 5 with the well known referee Les Bull in charge. They concluded the championship with games against Manukau at Manukau, Ponsonby on the Auckland Domain, and Māngere at the Māngere Trotting Ground. Only the result of the game with Ponsonby was reported which they lost 27 to 2. Of their 14 matches played they had 3 reported wins and 3 losses with the other 8 scores unknown. It is likely that they finished roughly mid table in the 11 team competition. In the knockout competition they lost 15–13 to Manukau on September 9 at Manukau, likely the present day Waikaraka Park. Then on September 30 they played at Carlaw Park # 2 against Ponsonby in a curtain raiser to the Roope Rooster final between Ponsonby and Athletic. The Auckland Star wrote brief comments about the match but the newspaper scan in Papers Past is almost illegible, though it appears the score was possibly Ponsonby 26, Ihumatao 21.

On September 16 an Auckland Junior representative side played a match against the Wednesday Representatives, a side made up of the company teams which played midweek. Wilson jun. of the Ihumātao team was selected in the side on the wing. They lost 16 to 8 though Wilson set up a try for second rower Pennycock for the Junior rep team after he “snapped up the ball in his own twenty-five and ran clean through the Wednesday team. On reaching the fullback he passed to Pennycook who scored under the posts” for Perry to convert.

=== 1923 season, second and third grade sides ===
In 1923 Ihumatao fielded sides in the second and third grades. They opened their season with games against Marist at the Auckland Domain #2, and Manukau #2 against Kingsland respectively on May 5.

The second grade side only had 4 of their 14 championship matches reported during the season which were a 16–8 loss to City on May 12, a 13–3 loss to Otahuhu on June 2, a 7–5 win over Ellerslie United on June 23, and a 16-14 los to Kingsland Rovers on June 30. On September 1 and September 15 they played knockout games against Otahuhu and Ellerslie respectively with neither score reported.

The third grade side played 12 games but only 4 results were reported, all losses. They were heavily defeated by Ponsonby on May 19 by 48 points to 0. They lost to Point Chevalier 22–3 at Victoria Park on June 9 and then to Parnell. Their final reported result for the season was a 32–0 loss to Manukau on July 28.

On September 29 the Auckland Junior representative side played a match at Huntly. Daniels of the Ihumatao side was chosen as a late replacement in the side for the match. Their last game of the season was in the Foster Shield knockout competition on October 6. They were defeated by Manukau 14 points to 5.

The Ihumātao club did not enter any sides in the 1924 competitions. The other Māngere side applied successfully to enter a team in the first grade competition and Paul and Wilson junior of the Ihumatao team both represented them. It is possible that the area was not able to support more than one team at this time, especially with the Manukau club also based nearly in the Onehunga suburb.

== Playing records ==
The results are incomplete. The New Zealand Herald and Auckland Star published the fixture list each week with details, but results were only sent to the newspapers sporadically during the season, so these records have been compiled from the known results.

=== Second grade ===
Season	Pld	W	D	L	PF	PA	PD	Pts	Position (Teams)
1922	14	3	0	3	78	107	-29	6	Approximately 6th of 12
1923	14	1	0	3	32	50	-18	2	Approximately 7th of 12
Total	28	4	0	6	110	157	-47	8	

=== Third grade ===
Season	Pld	W	D	L	PF	PA	PD	Pts	Position (Teams)
1923	12	0	0	4	6	116	-110	0	Approximately 13th of 14

== Representative players ==
=== Auckland Juniors (second grade) ===
Player	Years	Games	Tries	Goals	Points
Wilson jun.	1922	1	-	-	-
Daniels	1923	1	-	-	-
