= Wilson Hall (rugby league) =

New Zealand international rugby league footballer

A. Wilson Hall
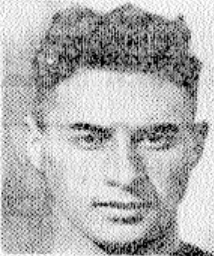

Personal information
- Born: 1900
- Died: 1959

Playing information
- Height: 5 ft 6 in (1.68 m)
- Weight: 67.6 kg (10 st 9 lb)
- Position: Scrum-half, Fullback
Club
Years	Team	Pld	T	G	FG	P
1921–22	Ngaruawahia	8	1	0	0	3
1923–25	Athletic (ARL)	35	6	4	0	26
1926–27	Hornby (CRL)	14	4	2	0	16
1928	Hull FC	44	2	0	0	6
1929–34	Castleford	175	24	0	0	72
1934	Dewsbury	1	0	0	0	0
	Total	277	37	6	0	123
Representative
Years	Team	Pld	T	G	FG	P
1921–22	Lower Waikato	5	0	0	0	0
1921–22	South Auckland	8	2	4	0	14
1922	Waikato	1	0	0	0	0
1923	Auckland	3	0	1	0	2
1923	Auckland Province	1	1	0	0	3
1925	North Island	1	0	0	0	0
1926	South Island	1	0	0	0	0
1926–27	New Zealand	1	6	0	0	18

A. Wilson Hall (1900 – 1959) was a New Zealand rugby league footballer who played in the 1920s and 1930s who represented New Zealand and later played at club level in England for Hull FC, Castleford and Dewsbury.

== Playing career ==
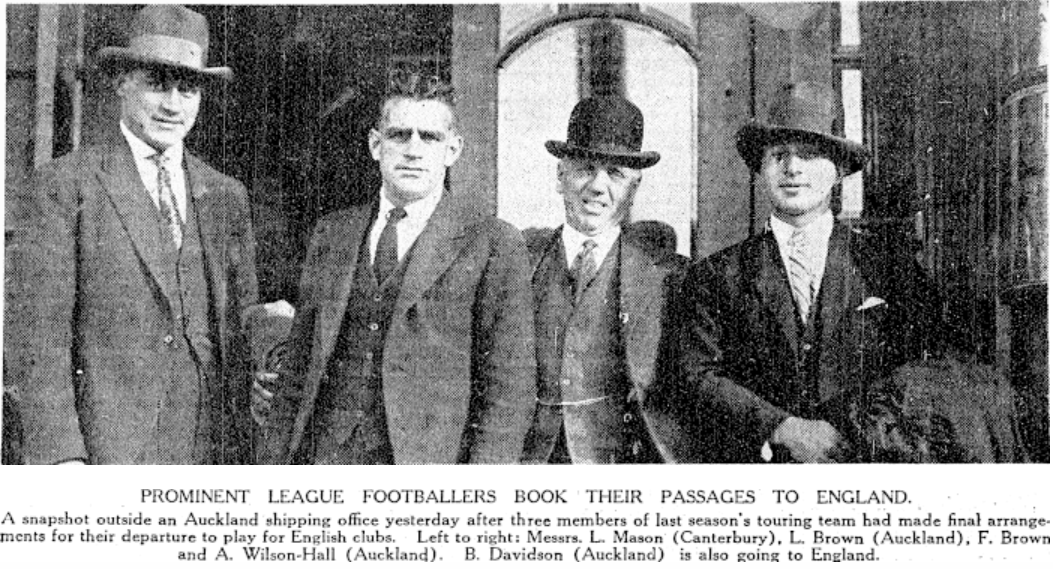

From the Ngaruawahia club, Wilson Hall represented South Auckland in 1922. He was a half for South Auckland and the North Island in 1925.

In 1923 he moved to Auckland and played for the Athletic club. He represented Auckland in a match against South Auckland for the Northern Union Challenge Cup which was drawn 20-20. Later in the same season he played against Auckland for the Auckland Province. The match was played at Carlaw Park and saw his side go down 18–44 with him scoring a try for the 'visiting team'.

In 1926 he moved to Christchurch. Wilson Hall then represented the Hornby club, Canterbury and the South Island.

He was selected for New Zealand's tour of Great Britain in 1926. He played in two test matches against Great Britain and one against Wales.

In 1927 the international transfer ban for players was lifted and many New Zealanders who had toured were signed by English clubs. Wilson Hall received interested from Halifax in June, before signing with Hull F.C.

Wilson Hall then joined Castleford, and played in Castleford's victory in the Yorkshire League during the 1932–33 season.

Hall was granted a free transfer by Castleford in September 1935 in recognition of his services.
