= 1930 Eastern Suburbs season =

← 1929	1931 →

The 1930 Eastern Suburbs season was the 23rd season that the Eastern Suburbs (now known as the Sydney Roosters) competed in the New South Wales Rugby League.

== Details ==
- Lineup:

Arthur Halloway (Coach) • Cyril Abbotomey • Perc Atkinson • Morrie Boyle • Dave Brown • Joe Busch • Hugh Byrne • Jack Coote • T. Fitzpatrick • Gordon Fletcher • Jack Hickey • Billy Hong • Joe Joseph • Jack Lynch • Joe Pearce • Norm Pope • Les Rogers • Ray Stehr

== Ladder ==
	Team	Pld	W	D	L	PF	PA	PD	Pts
1	Western Suburbs	14	12	0	2	237	130	+107	24
2	Eastern Suburbs	14	11	0	3	316	178	+138	22
3	South Sydney	14	9	0	5	234	174	+60	18
4	St. George	14	6	2	6	161	151	+10	14
5	Newtown	14	6	1	7	194	176	+18	13
6	Balmain	14	5	2	7	214	218	-4	12
7	North Sydney	14	2	1	11	164	289	-125	5
8	University	14	2	0	12	117	321	-204	4

== Season summary ==
- Rugby league legend Dave Brown made his debut for the Eastern Suburbs club.
- Round 1 - Eastern Suburb defeating Balmain 12 at Wentworth Park Ground.
- Round 2 - Eastern Suburb 11 defeated St George 6 at Earl Park.
- Round 3 - Western Suburbs 24 defeated Eastern Suburb 12 at Sydney Sports Ground.
- Morrie Boyle was the leading Try scorer, with 15 Tries, in the NSWRL

Preceded by 1929	Season; 1930	Succeeded by 1931
