= 1928 Eastern Suburbs season =

← 1927	1929 →

Eastern Suburbs (now known as the Sydney Roosters) competed in the 31st New South Wales Rugby League season in 1928.

== Details ==
- Home Ground:Agricultural Ground
- Lineup: Cyril Abotomey Coach;

• G. Boddington, • Dick Brown(HK) • Sam Byrant • Joe 'Chimpy' Busch(HB) • Hugh Byrne • A.Carter • Bill Cole (HB) • Bill Dyer • Gordon Fletcher • T.Fitzpatrick • Nelson Hardy • G.Harris • Larry Hedger • H.Kavanagh • Arthur Oxford • Norm Pope • Les Steel • A.Toby • Tom Trotter • Vic Webber(WG).

== Ladder ==
	Team	Pld	W	D	L	B	PF	PA	PD	Pts
1	St. George	13	12	0	1	1	200	98	+102	26
2	Eastern Suburbs	12	11	0	1	2	192	116	+76	26
3	South Sydney	13	8	0	5	1	216	152	+64	18
4	North Sydney	12	6	0	6	2	157	149	+8	16
5	University	13	6	0	7	1	184	176	+8	14
6	Western Suburbs	12	4	0	8	2	174	206	-32	12
7	Glebe	12	4	0	8	2	94	149	-55	12
8	Balmain	13	4	0	9	1	180	236	-56	10
9	Newtown	12	1	0	11	2	112	227	-115	6

== Season summary ==
- Eastern Suburbs finished the season as runners-up after being defeated by South Sydney in that year's premier decider.
- Eastern Suburbs took part in the first night rugby league match to be played in Australia. A ten aside exhibition match that was played between the two premiership finalists, Souths were victorious once again winning 10–6.

== Results ==
- Premiership Round 1, 21 April 1928;

Eastern Suburbs 18 (4 Tries. 3 Goals) defeated University 14(2 Tries; 4 Goals) at the Agricultural Ground.

- Premiership Semi-Final, 7 September 1928

Eastern Suburbs 26(Steel 2, Webber, H. Kavanagh, Oxford Tries; Oxford 4 Goals) defeated North Sydney 13( K. Woods, T. Murray, L. McGrath Tries; L. Carroll 2 Goals) at Wentworth Park.

With 8 minutes remaining and scores locked at 13 all, Easts' piled on three tries in quick time against an exhausted North Sydney who finished the match with just eleven men.

- Premiership Final, 15 September 1928;

South Sydney 26( Harry Kadwell, George Treweek, Williams, Quinlivan Tries; B. Wearing 2, Quinlivivan Goals) defeated Eastern Suburbs 5(Steel Try; Oxford Goal) at the Agricultural Ground. Details

Preceded by 1927	Season; 1928	Succeeded by 1929
