= 1927 Eastern Suburbs season =

← 1926	1928 →

Eastern Suburbs (now known as the Sydney Roosters) competed in the 30th New South Wales Rugby League season in 1927.

== Details ==
- Home Ground: Agricultural Ground
- Lineup:-

Cyril Abotomey • J. Barratt • Tom Barry • George Boddington • Bill Ives • Massey • F. Jefferies • G. Hall • George Harris • G. Keys • G.H. Clamback • H. Kavanagh • Hugh Byrne • Nelson Hardy • P. Burton • Dick Brown • R. Kerr • T. Fitzpatrick • Rick Bevan • Norm Pope • Arthur Robinson • Jack Coote • Vic Webber • S. Sharp • A. Carter

Preceded by 1926	Season; 1927	Succeeded by 1928
