= 1931 NSWRFL season =

Rugby league competition

1931 New South Wales Rugby Football League
- Teams: 8
- Premiers: South Sydney (10th title)
- Minor premiers: Eastern Suburbs (4th title)
- Matches played: 60
- Points scored: 1681
- Top points scorer: Jack Lynch (124)
- Wooden spoon: University (6th spoon)
- Top try-scorer: Jack Lynch (16)

The 1931 New South Wales Rugby Football League premiership was the twenty-fourth season of Sydney’s top-level rugby league club competition, Australia’s first. During the season, which lasted from April until September, eight teams from across the city contested the premiership which culminated in a grand final between minor premiers Eastern Suburbs and South Sydney.

== Season summary ==
The NSWRFL banned radio broadcasting of its matches in 1931 on the grounds that it was affecting the gates. After a year of broadcasts from nearby rooftops and ladders outside the grounds the League rescinded their ban.

=== Teams ===
- Balmain, formed on January 23, 1908, at Balmain Town Hall
- Eastern Suburbs, formed on January 24, 1908, at Paddington Town Hall
- Newtown, formed on January 14, 1908
- North Sydney, formed on February 7, 1908
- South Sydney, formed on January 17, 1908, at Redfern Town Hall
- St. George, formed on November 8, 1920, at Kogarah School of Arts
- Western Suburbs, formed on February 4, 1908
- University, formed in 1919 at Sydney University

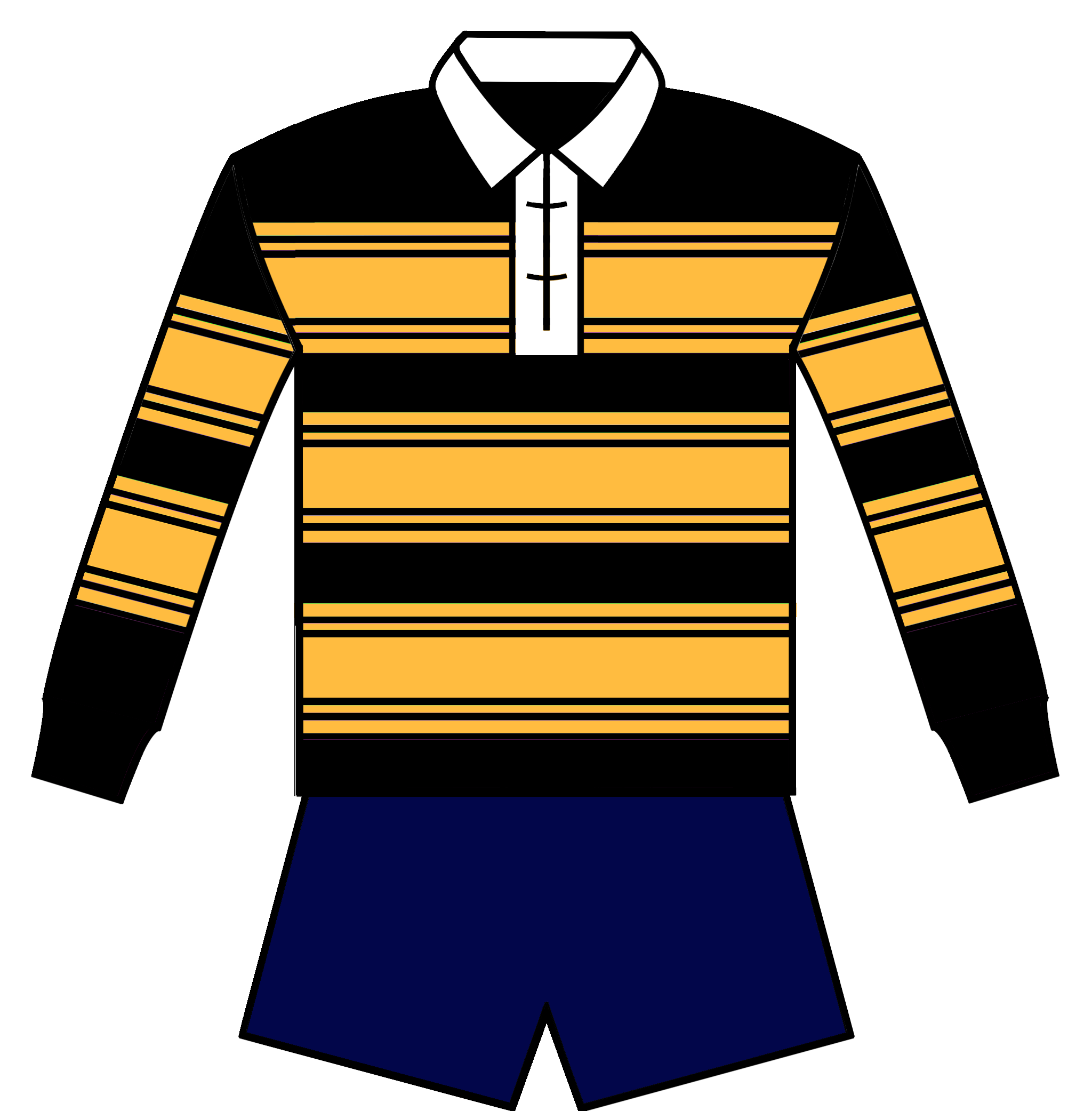
Balmain 24th season Ground: Birchgrove Oval; Coach: Reg Latta; Captain: Arthur Toby

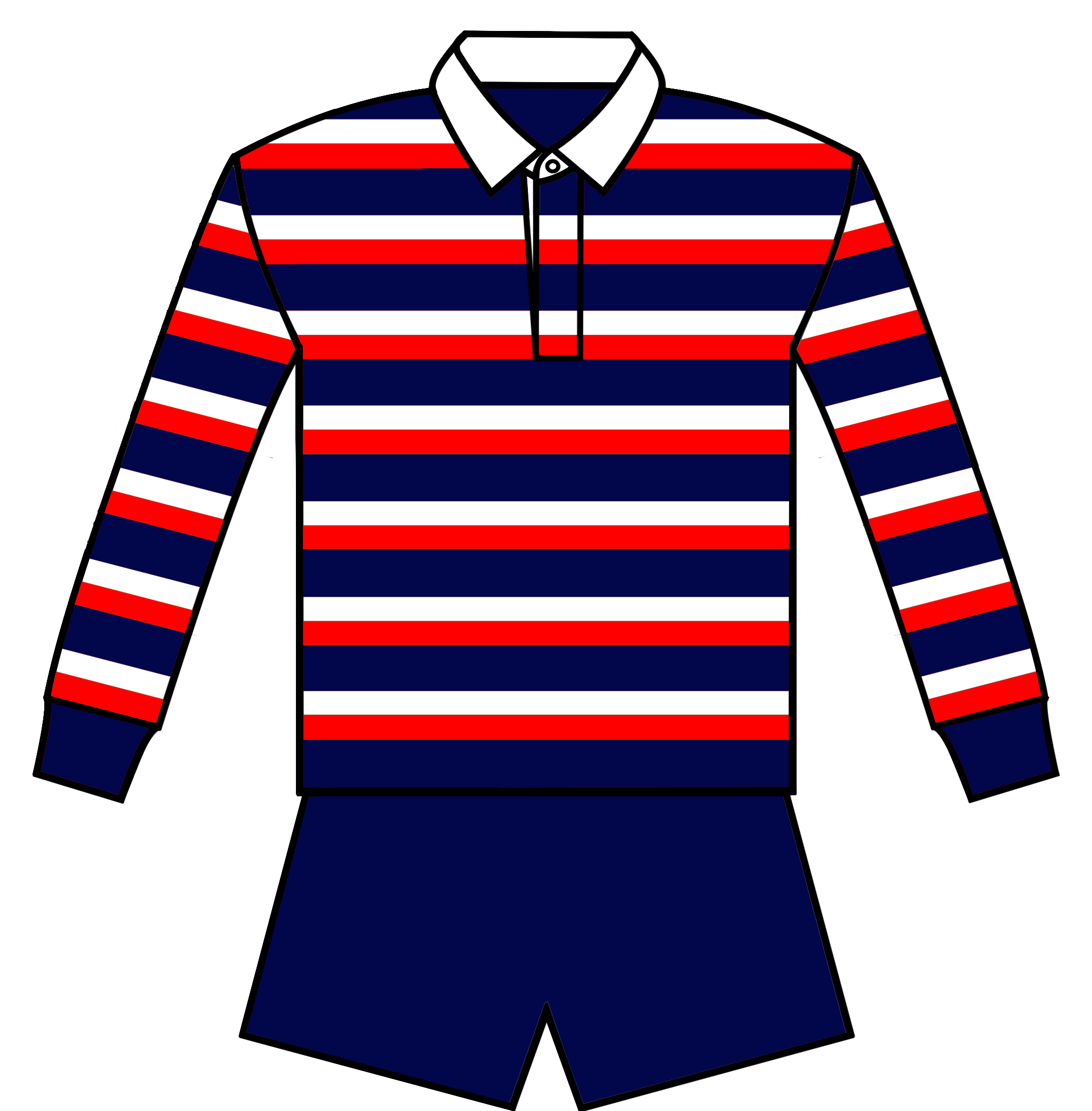
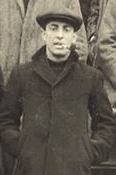
Eastern Suburbs 24th season Ground: Sydney Sports Ground Coach: Arthur Halloway; Captain: Norm Pope

Newtown 24th season Ground: Marrickville Oval; Captain: Jack Holmes

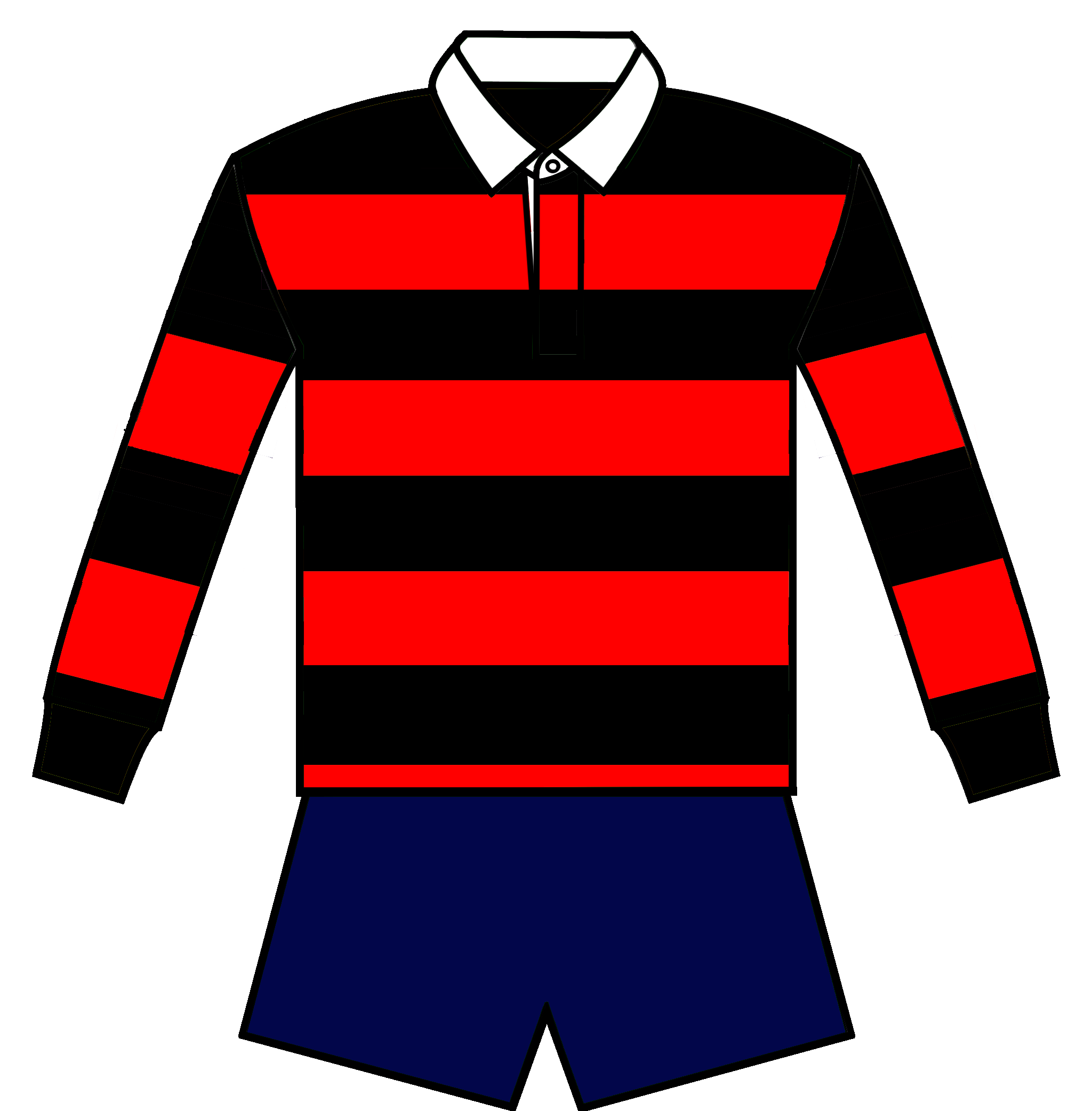
North Sydney 24th season Ground: North Sydney Oval; Captain-Coach: Tom Wright

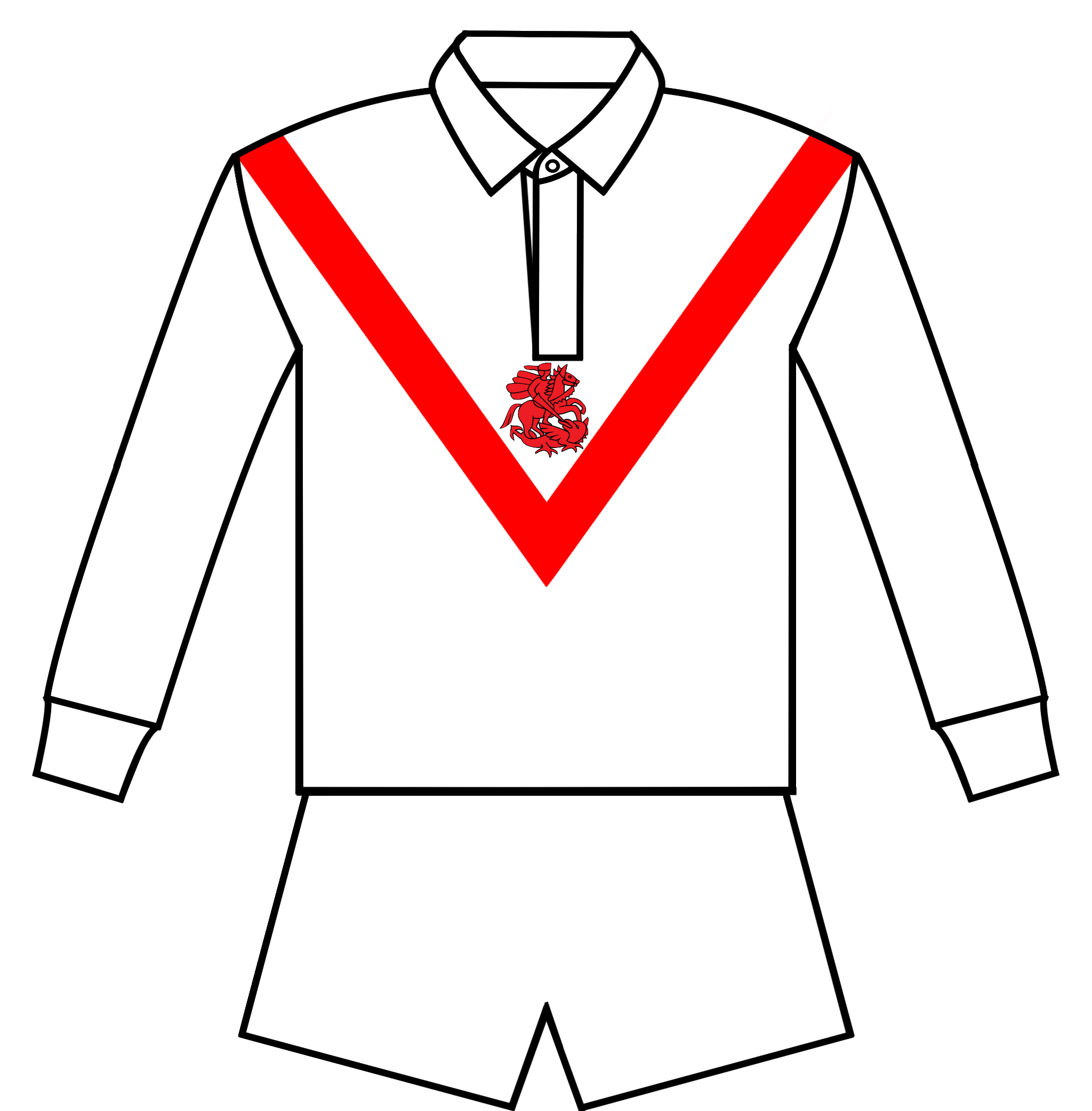
St. George 11th season Ground: Earl Park Captain-coach: Harry Kadwell

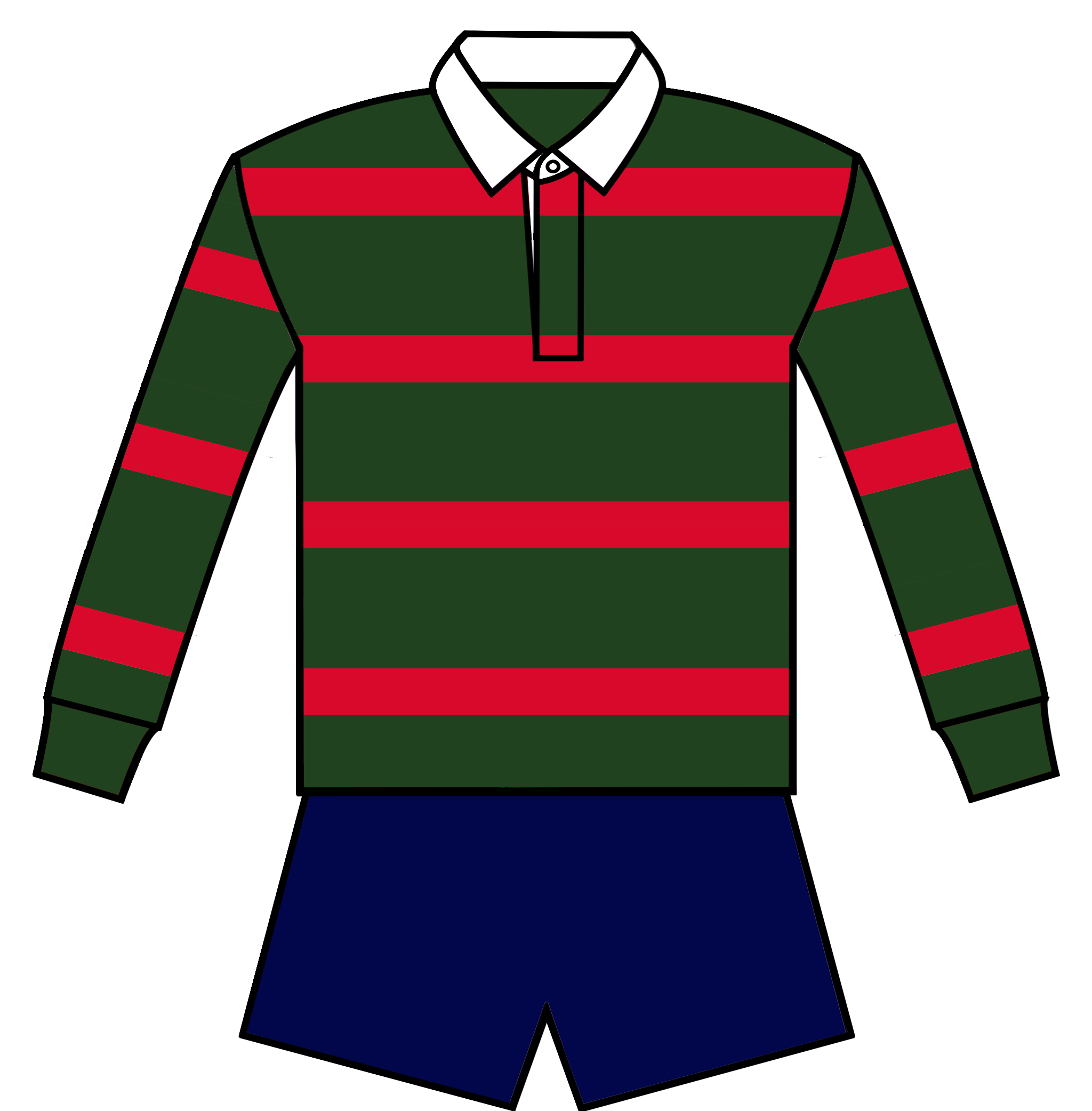
South Sydney 24th season Ground: Sydney Sports Ground; Coach: Charlie Lynch; Captain: Pat Maher

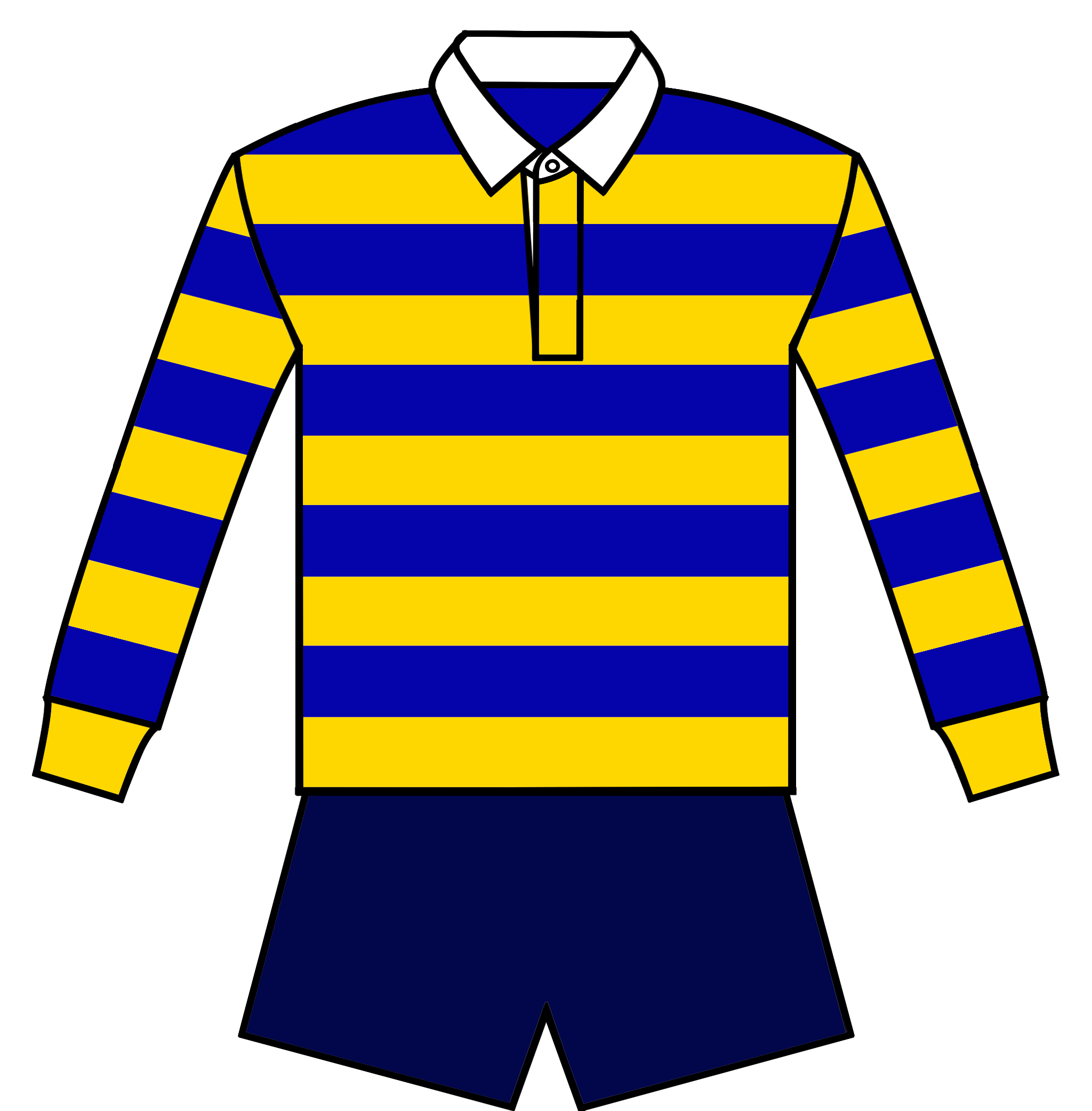
University 12th season Captain: Sammy Ogg

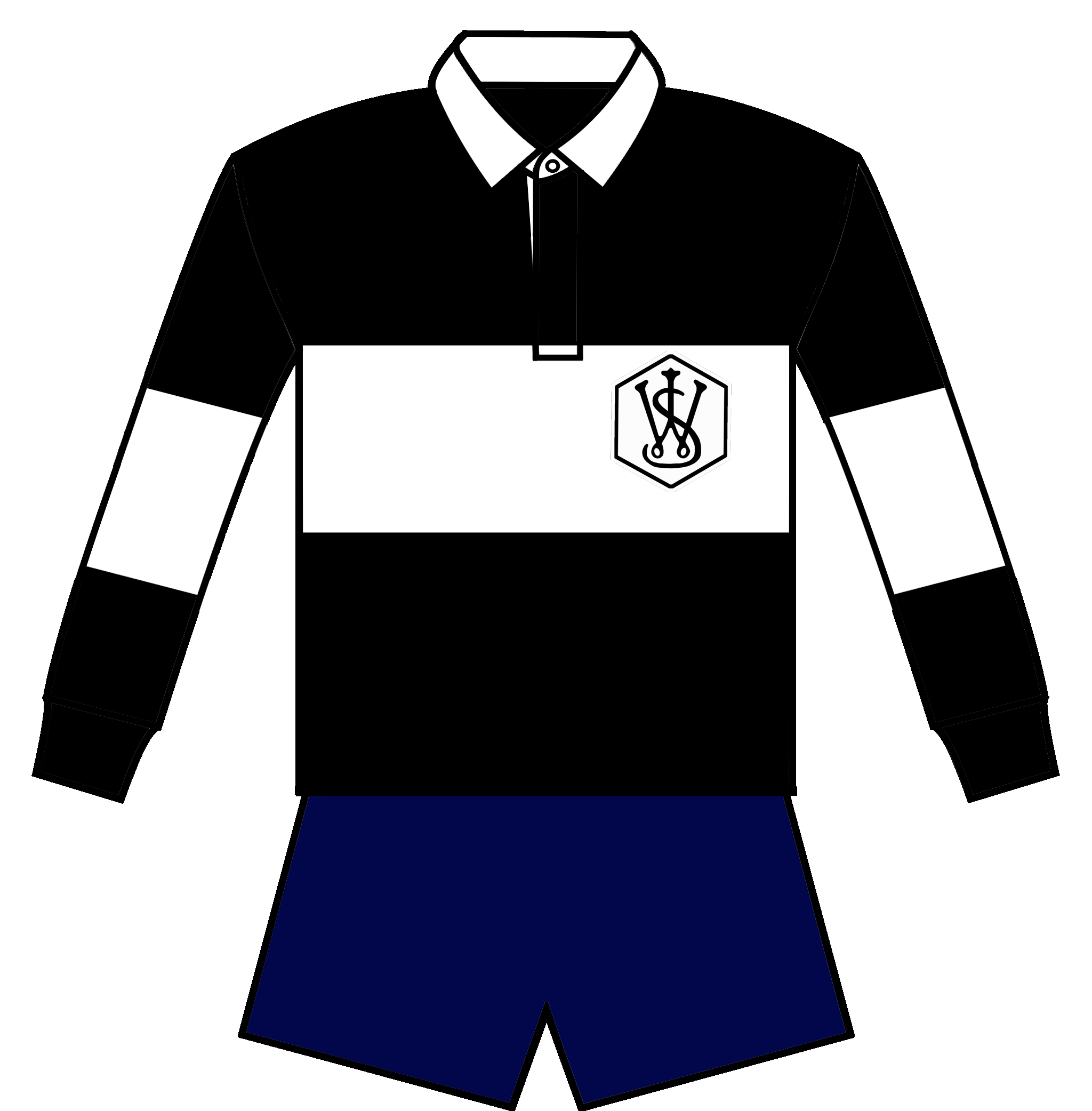
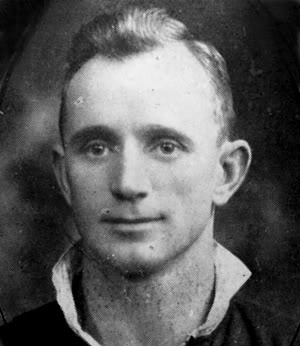
Western Suburbs 24th season Ground:Pratten Park Coach: Frank McMillan; Captain: Bill Brogan

=== Ladder ===
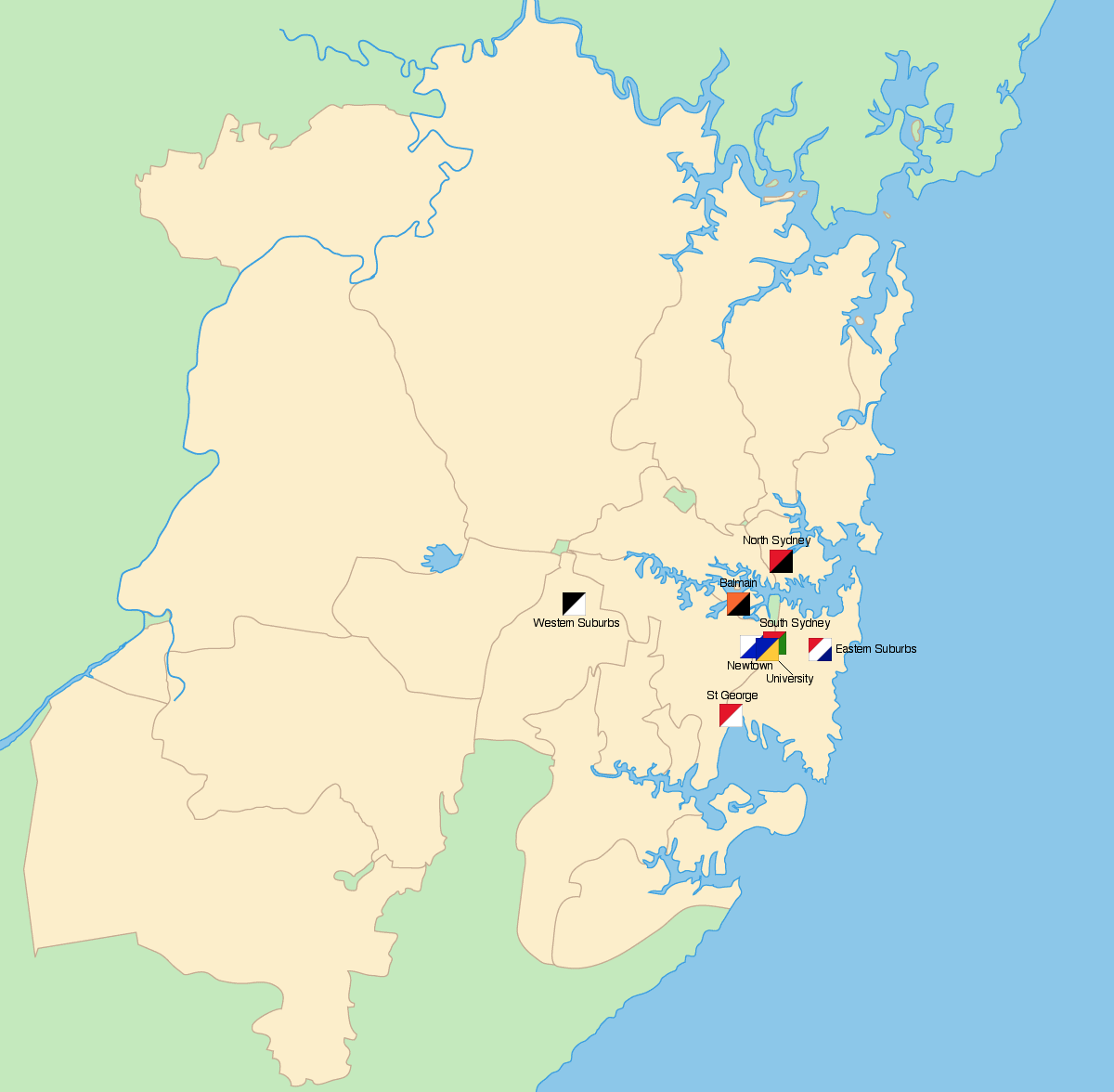
The geographical locations of the teams that contested the 1931 premiership across Sydney.

	Team	Pld	W	D	L	PF	PA	PD	Pts
1	Eastern Suburbs	14	12	0	2	339	121	+218	24
2	South Sydney	14	9	0	5	250	176	+74	18
3	Western Suburbs	14	9	0	5	220	227	−7	18
4	St. George	14	8	0	6	178	183	−5	16
5	North Sydney	14	6	0	8	143	198	−55	12
6	Newtown	14	5	0	9	205	194	+11	10
7	Balmain	14	5	0	9	133	205	−72	10
8	Sydney University	14	2	0	12	135	299	−164	4

== Finals ==
Home	Score	Away	Match Information
Home	Score	Away	Date and Time	Venue	Referee	Crowd
Semifinals
South Sydney	16–5	St. George	21 August 1931	Sydney Sports Ground	McGrath	17,561
Eastern Suburbs	8–10	Western Suburbs	29 August 1931	Sydney Sports Ground	Webby Neill	20,387
Preliminary Final
South Sydney	17–3	Western Suburbs	5 September 1931	Sydney Sports Ground	Lal Dean	22,767
Grand Final
Eastern Suburbs	7–12	South Sydney	12 September 1931	Sydney Sports Ground	Lal Dean	27,104

=== Chart ===
Semi-finals
1	Easts	8
3	Wests	10
2	Souths	16
4	St George	5

Final
Wests	3
Souths	17

Grand final
MP	Easts	7
Souths	12

=== Grand Final ===
Eastern Suburbs	Position	South Sydney
21. Morrie Boyle	FB	31. Albert Spillane
13. Billy Hong	WG	12. Benny Wearing
11. Dave Brown	CE	11. Jack Morrison
10. Jack Lynch	CE	16. Pat Maher
9. Fred Tottey	WG	17. Jack Why
8. Ernie Norman	FE	27. Jim Deeley
7. Norm Pope (c)	HB	10. Harry Eyers
1. Ray Stehr	PR	24. Carl Eggen
2. Dick Brown	HK	3. Edward Root
3. Perc Atkinson	PR	23. Frank Curran
4. Max Nixon	SR	4. George Treweek (c)
5. Joe Pearce	SR	5. Frank O'Connor
6. Les Rogers	LK	25. Percy Williams
Arthur Halloway	Coach	Charlie Lynch

Eastern Suburbs started the match as short-priced favourites, and ran with the breeze from the western end after their captain Pope won the toss. With hooker Dick Brown dominating the scrums, Eastern Suburbs attacked early. The first points came at the twenty-minute mark when Lynch kicked a goal after O’Connor was penalised in front of the posts. He missed another attempt two minutes later but Easts went further ahead when Lynch kicked another goal, from a drop kick. Benny Wearing had his chance for South Sydney but was pulled down from behind by Dave Brown two yards from the line. At halftime Eastern Suburbs led 4–0.

Five-minutes after the break South Sydney seized control of the match. They attacked desperately as Treweeke, Curran and then Root hurled themselves at the Eastern Suburbs line. A scrum followed and with an overlap out wide Wearing crossed unopposed in the corner. The winger then converted his own try to give South Sydney a 5–4 lead. Eastern Suburbs then hit back with a remarkable try. Billy Hong gathered in his own twenty-five yard area, stepped through the defence to halfway, passed to Tottey who beat Morrison in a race for the ball. Dave Brown missed the goal, Eastern Suburbs led 7–5. South Sydney fullback Spillane then landed a goal from two yards on his own side of halfway to level the score at 7–all.

Hong then went off after twisting an ankle, Eastern Suburbs struggled to contend with the extra man in South Sydney's backline. Chances followed for both sides – South Sydney's winger, Why, was thrown out at the corner post, Morrison lost possession close to the line and Brown missed with a penalty.

With only minutes left and scores locked at 7–all, South Sydney five-eighth Harry Eyres seized possession inside Eastern Suburbs quarter, stood still for a split second, then with an electrifying burst of speed exploded through the converging defence. He beat the ineffective tackle of Hong (who had come back onto the field) and with the referee accidentally getting in the way of Brown coming over in cover defence for Eastern Suburbs, Eyres crossed for the match winning try. Hong then collapsed and had to be carried from the field as Williams was converting the try.

It was widely claimed as one of the most thrilling Grand Finals in the short history of the game in Sydney.

South Sydney 12
Tries: Wearing, Eyres. Goals: Wearing, Williams, Spillane

Eastern Suburbs 7
Tries: Tottey. Goals: Lynch (2)

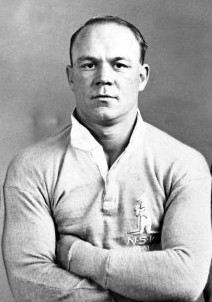
Ernie Norman

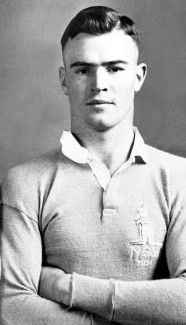
Ray Stehr

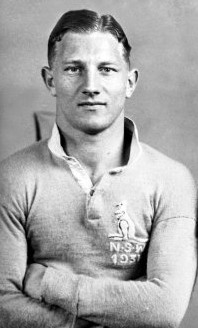
Dave Brown
