= 1926 Eastern Suburbs season =

← 1925	1927 →

The 1926 Eastern Suburbs season was the 19th in the club's history. They competed in the 1926 NSWRFL Premiership, finishing the regular season 3rd (out of 9). Easts came within one match of the premiership final but were knocked out by eventual premiers, South Sydney.

== Details ==
- Home Ground:
- Lineup:-

George Boddington • Hugh Byrne • Bill Ives • G. H. Clamback • Harry Finch • N.Fitzpatrick • T.Fitzpatrick • G. Hall • Nelson Hardy • Larry Hedger • H. Kavanagh • G.Harris • C. Massey • G.McGee • Tom Molloy • T. ?. Molloy • H. 'Joe' Moxon • Arthur Oxford • Ed 'Snowy' Rigney • Les Steel • Arthur E. Toby • Jack 'Bluey' Watkins.

Preceded by 1925	Season; 1926	Succeeded by 1927
