= 1929 Eastern Suburbs season =

← 1928	1930 →

Eastern Suburbs (now known as the Sydney Roosters) competed in the 22nd New South Wales Rugby League season in 1928.

== Details ==
- Home Ground: Agricultural Ground
- Lineup:- George Boddington(Coach);

• Cyril Abotomey, • B. Bakewell • J. Barratt • Morrie Boyle • Richard Brown • Joe Busch • Harry Caples • A. Carter • W.Cole • Jack Coote • F. Davies • Tom Fitzpatrick • Gordon Fletcher • Nelson Hardy • George Harris • Larry Hedger • Billy Hong • Harry Kavanagh • Joe Pearce • Norm Pope • Bill Shankland • Ray Stehr • George Torpy.

=== Ladder ===
	Team	Pld	W	D	L	B	PF	PA	PD	Pts
1	South Sydney	16	13	1	2	2	296	104	+192	31
2	St. George	16	11	1	4	2	180	147	+33	27
3	Western Suburbs	16	10	2	4	2	258	153	+105	26
4	Newtown	16	10	0	6	2	188	169	+19	24
5	North Sydney	16	6	3	7	2	194	211	-17	19
6	Balmain	16	6	1	9	2	213	259	-46	17
7	Eastern Suburbs	16	4	2	10	2	203	269	-66	14
8	Glebe	16	3	3	10	2	166	261	-95	13
9	University	16	2	1	13	2	157	282	-125	9

Preceded by 1928	Season; 1929	Succeeded by 1930
