= North Shore Albions =

Defunct NZ rugby league club, based in Auckland

Club information
- Full name: North Shore Albions Rugby League Football Club
- Colours: Black and White
- Founded: 1909
- Exited: 2005; 21 years ago

Former details
- Grounds: Bayswater Park; Devonport Domain
- Competition: Auckland Rugby League

Records
- Premierships: 1913, 1914, 1928, 1932, 1933, 1941
- Runners-up: 1916, 1924, 1929, 1931, 1939, 1940
- Minor premierships: 1941, 1946, 1955,
- Stormont Shield: 1930, 1931, 1933, 1940, 1945, 1954,
- Roope Rooster: 1915, 1931, 1945, 1954
- Norton Cup: 1931, 1973, 1990, 1991

The North Shore Albions were a rugby league club based on the North Shore of Auckland in Devonport before moving to Bayswater at a later time. They formed in 1909 and folded in the early 2000s due to a lack of playing numbers. At the start of the 1920 season they were renamed Devonport United when they amalgamated with the Sunnyside club. It was proposed at the merger that they be known as North Shore Albions but Sunnyside objected and the name of Devonport United was chosen. In 1937, 17 years later at their annual general meeting they decided to revert to the name "North Shore Albions" as they had been commonly referred to as "shore" for many years. Chairman H. Mann made the proposal and it was adopted by the club. Aside from Northcote and Birkenhead Ramblers they were the only club on the North Shore at that time. They closed their doors in 2005. The only remaining club connected to them are the Northern Brothers who are based at Ngataringa Bay Sports Field. Their senior team is an amalgamation of East Coast Bays Barracudas and Glenfield Greyhounds but are based more in the North Shore Albions traditional area which includes the navy ground which has provided many players and teams over the years. The predominant colours are black and green which have been common colours of all the North Shore clubs over the decades.

== History ==
=== 1909-1919 ===
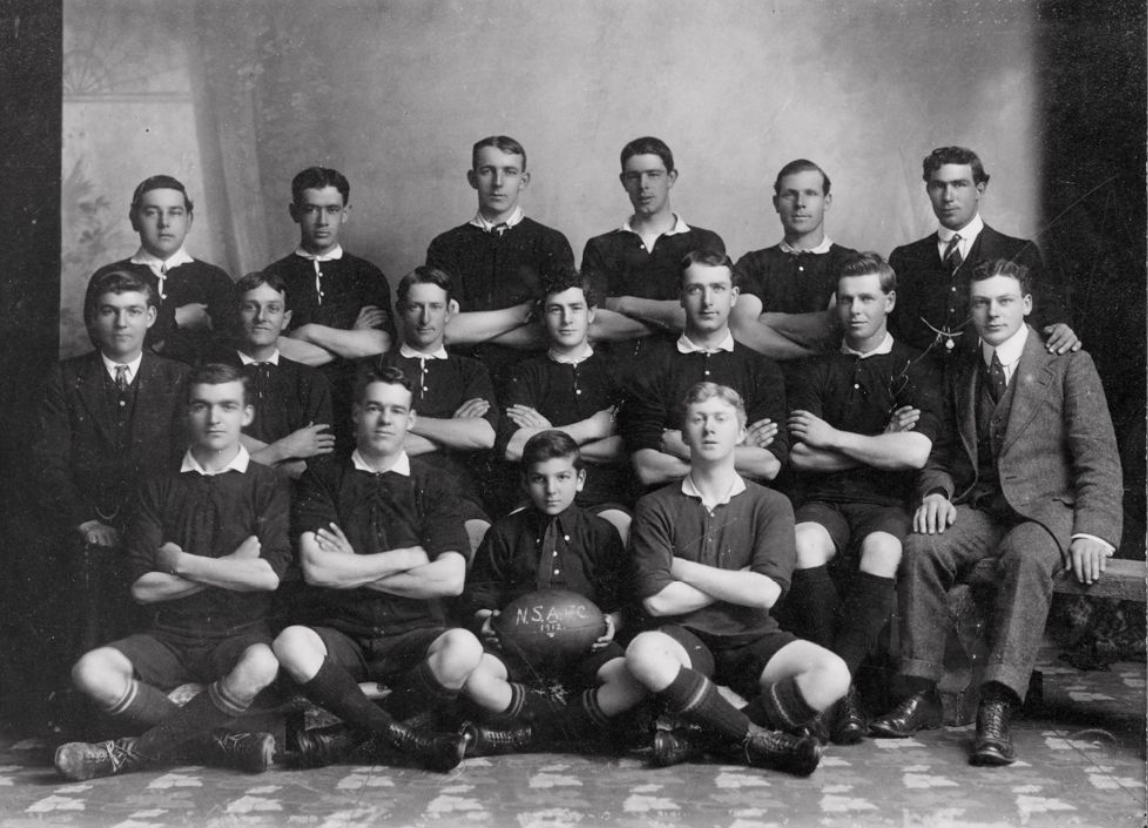
1912 North Shore second grade team. Edward Fox is third from the left in the back row.

They were formed in 1909 when the Auckland Rugby League competition was in its infancy, having its own first General Meeting that same season.

They were officially born on the evening of 23 July 1909 when a meeting was held at the Devonport Council Chambers. The following people were elected officers for the inaugural season: President – Dr. Guinness, Vice Presidents – Dr. Bennett, Captain Pilkington, Mr W. Swinnerton, Mr. A. Goldwater, and Mr. D. W. McLean, Committee – Mr. F. Gladding, Mr. P. Gerrard, Mr. Clark, Mr. Marshall, Mr. Wells, and Mr. Powell, with Mr. A. J. Powley the Secretary and Treasurer.

They played in the first ever rugby league match between two Auckland club teams when they played City Rovers at Eagleton's Paddock in Epsom. North Shore put out a strong side and won the match by 44 points to 22. Their team was made up of the following players: Frederick Neighbour, Fred Gladding, Richard Wynyard, Gerrard, George Seagar, Frank Woodward, Jim Griffin, B Wells, Allen, C Wells, J Percival, Shaw, H McReynolds, S Marshall, Powell, William Wynyard, McDonald, and Stevens.

24 July 1909	North Shore	44–24	City	Eagleton's Paddock, Epsom
	Try: B Wells 2, Frederick Neighbour, J Percival, Fred Gladding 2, George Seagar 3 Con: Frank Woodward 7		Try: Arthur Carlaw, William Tyler, Charles Linkhorn 2, Len Farrant, George Smith; Con: Thomas Houghton, Len Farrant 2	Referee: Matt Hooper

They also played one match on the Devonport Domain that year against a combined town team which they won by 26 points to 10.

14 August 1909	North Shore	26-10	Combined Town	North Shore Cricket Ground
3:00	Try: Unknown		Try: Unknown

They then finished the year with a match against Newton Rangers at Victoria Park on September 4.

4 September 1909	Newton Rangers	17–16	North Shore Albions	Victoria Park
3:00	Try: Alf Chorley, William Mackrell 2 Con: Dick Bradburn 3 Pen: Dick Bradburn		Try: Jim Griffen, J Williams 2, McReynolds; Con: S Marshall; Pen: Frederick Neighbour

In 1913 North Shore won their first ever first grade championship. They finished the season with a 5 win, 1 draw, 1 loss record, with their 11 competition points three ahead of Newton Rangers, City Rovers, and Ponsonby United all on 8.

18 July	Ponsonby	2–13	North Shore	Victoria Park
3:00	Pen: Charles Webb		Try: Wynyard, Edward Fox, Stan Weston; Con: Jack Paul 2	Attendance: 7,000; Referee: Dick Benson

In 1914 North Shore was tied with Ponsonby United after 9 rounds with 15 competition points each. This meant a final was required to find the champion. North Shore won by 13 points to 2 on Victoria Park before a crowd of 7,000.

=== 1920-1929 ===
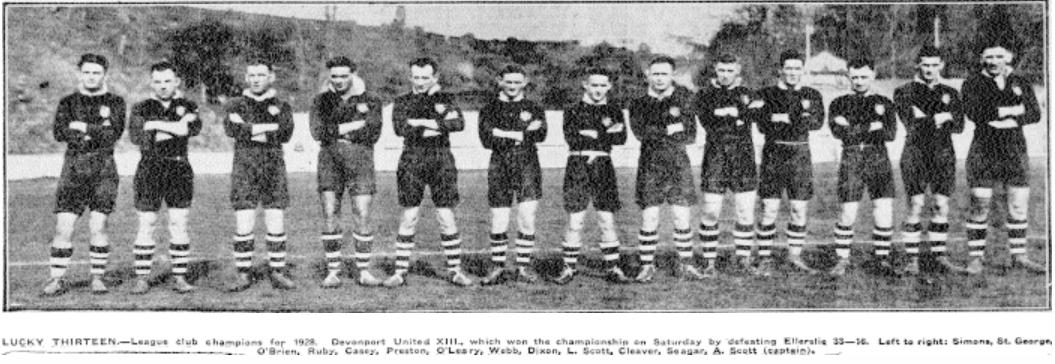
1928 champion side

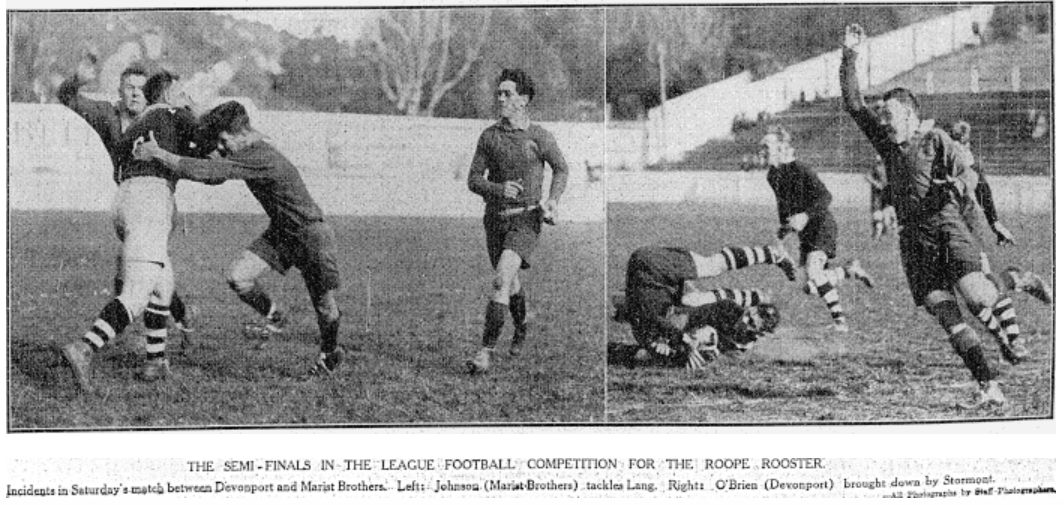
1926 Roope Rooster semi final between North Shore and Marist with Jim O'Brien tipped over

The 1920s were a fairly mediocre decade for the North Shore senior side. They finished in the middle of the table most years, though in 1924 Marist Old Boys had 21 competition points and North Shore had 23 competition points but North Shore had played one extra game. The Auckland Rugby League decided that the two sides should meet in a final to decide the title.

Marist won a gripping game 20–17 to deny North Shore their third first grade championship.

27 September	Marist	20–17	Devonport	Carlaw Park 1
3:00	Try: John Stormont, Jack Kirwan, Billy Ghent, Malloy; Con: Charles Gregory 3 Pen: Charles Gregory		Try: Bert Laing, Alf Harper, Harry Douglas; Con: Bert Laing, Alf Scott; Pen: Bert Laing 2	Attendance: 17,000; Referee: Bill Murray

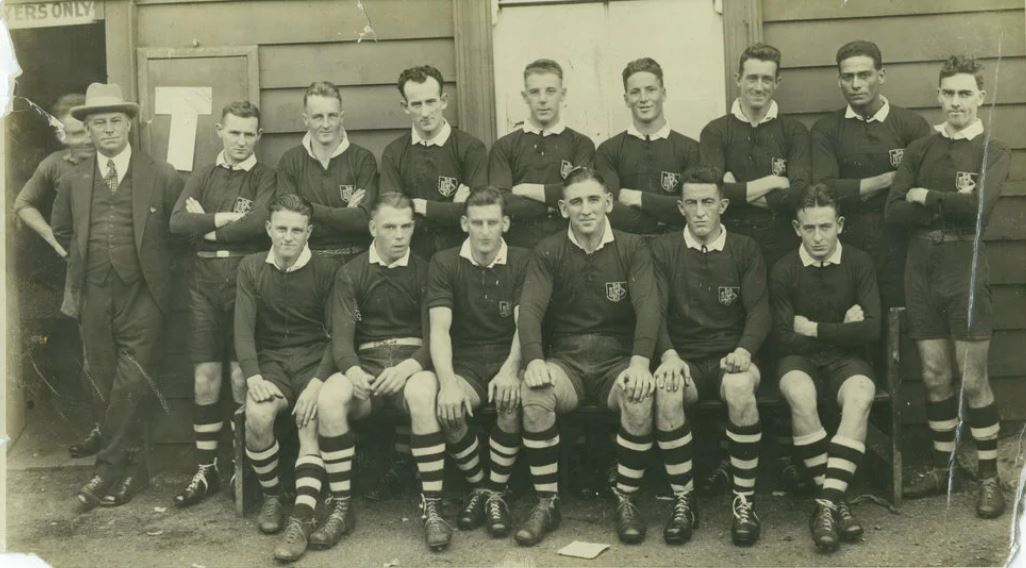
The 1929 team which finished runner up to Ponsonby. Captain, Alf Scott is seated in the centre. To his left is Kiwi Allan Seagar, standing behind him slightly to the right is his cousin, Kiwi, Len Scott.

North Shore won the first grade championship for the 3rd time in 1928. At this time it was named the Monteith Shield and was replaced by the Fox Memorial Shield in 1931. They had a 9 win, 3 loss record and finished 3 competition points ahead of the Richmond Rovers. Auckland representative, Ernest Ruby is standing second from the right. The following year in 1929 they were tied with Ponsonby United after the final round so a final was played however they lost 5–0 before 11,000 at Carlaw Park.

10 August	Ponsonby	5–0	Devonport	Carlaw Park 1
3:00	Try: George Gardiner; Pen: Frank Delgrosso			Attendance: 11,000; Referee: Les Bull

=== 1930-1939 ===
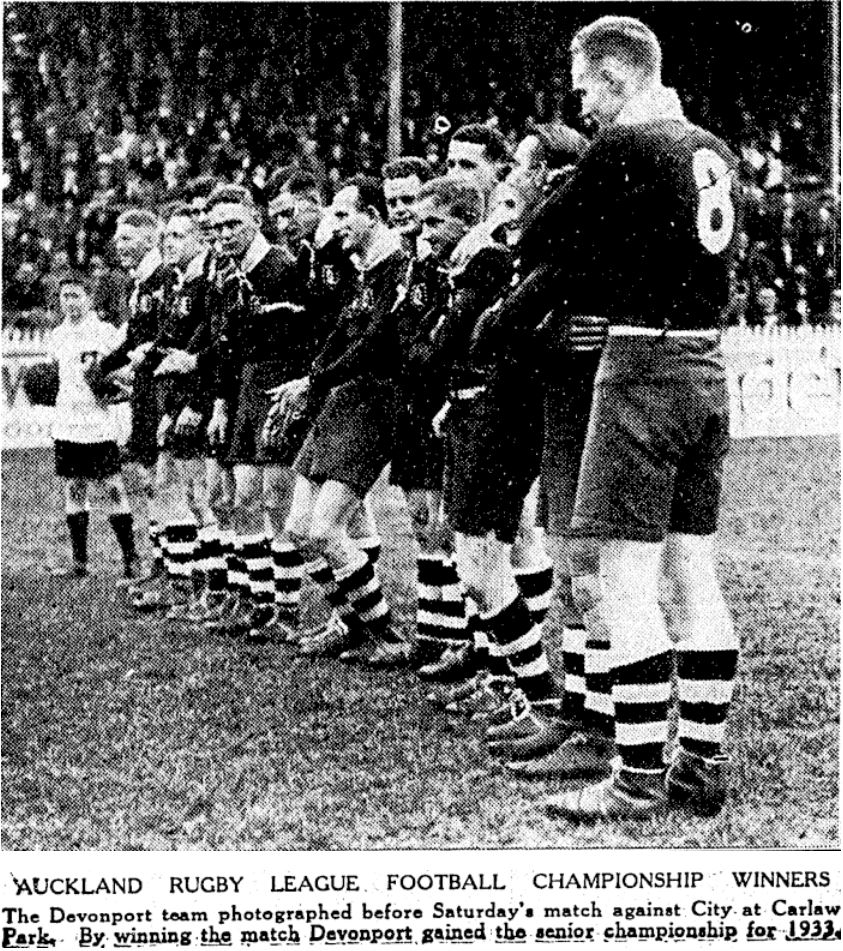
Devonport United (North Shore) championship winning team in 1933 at Carlaw Park. This photo was taken before their 17–12 win over City Rovers which sealed the title.

North Shore won the championship twice in the 1930s. The first was in 1932 while the second was in the following year when they went back to back with victory in 1933. Their teams included New Zealand international players such as Len Scott, Allan Seagar, Dick Smith, Bert Leatherbarrow, and Albert Laing, as well as Auckland representatives Hugh Simpson, Ted Scott, Ernest Ruby, Horace Hunt, Leslie Oliff, Alf Smith, and John Donald. While Waikato and New Zealand player James Jones joined the side in 1932.

==== North Shore v Eastern Suburbs (Sydney) ====
In 1931 North Shore played against Eastern Suburbs from Sydney. The match was played on October 10 at Carlaw Park before a crowd of 17,000. North Shore lost a high scoring match by 41 points to 27.

10 October	Devonport	27–41	Eastern Suburbs	Carlaw Park 1
3:00	Try: Dick Smith, Allan Seagar, Hugh Simpson, Len Scott, Albert Laing; Con: Dick Smith 4 Pen: Dick Smith 2		Try: Ernie Norman, Morrie Boyle 2, Dick Brown, Dave Brown, Les Rogers 2, Viv Thicknesse, Fred Tottey; Con: Morrie Boyle 6, Dave Brown	Attendance: 17,000; Referee: Les Bull

==== North Shore & Marist Combined v Eastern Suburbs ====
Then a week later on October 17 a combined North Shore and Marist side played the same opponent and won 14 to 13 before 15,000 at Carlaw Park.

17 October	Devonport-Marist	14–13	Eastern Suburbs	Carlaw Park 1
3:15	Try: Len Scott, Hec Brisbane; Con: Alan Clarke; Pen: Alan Clarke 3		Try: Dave Brown 2, Fred Tottey; Con: Morrie Boyle 2	Attendance: 15,000; Referee: Percy Rogers

==== North Shore v St George ====
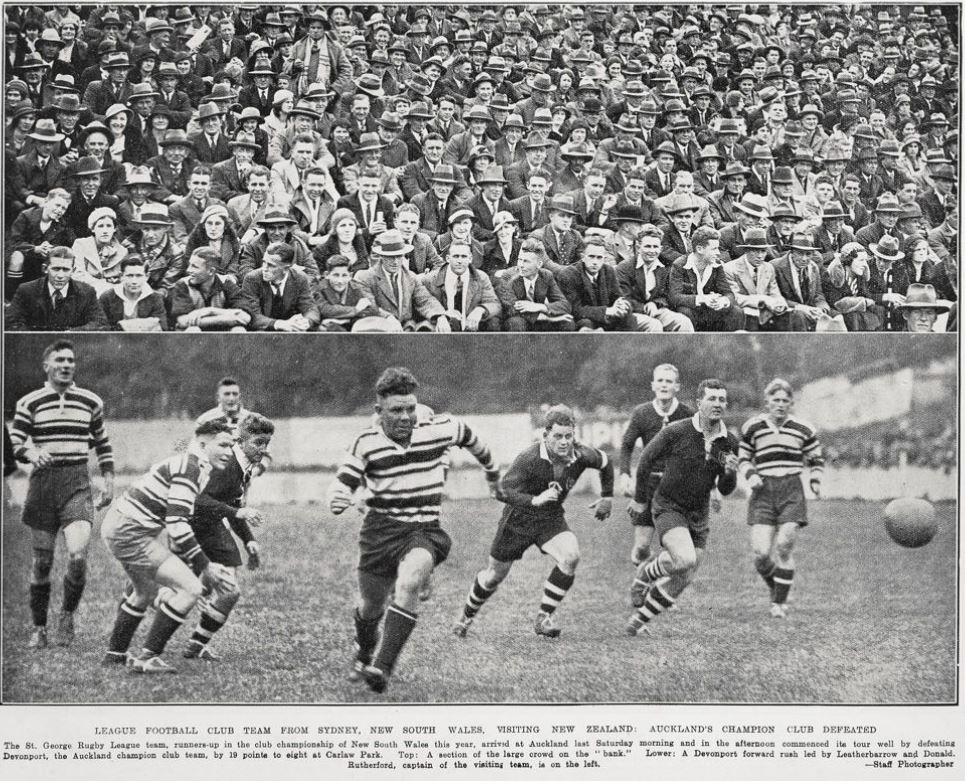
Jim Rutherford of St George chasing the ball with Bert Leatherbarrow and John Donald of Devonport following behind.

In 1933 North Shore won the championship by one point from Marist. At the end of the season St George, who had finished runner up in the NSWRL championship toured New Zealand. In their first game on September 23 they played North Shore and won 17–8.

23 September	Devonport	8–19	St George	Carlaw Park 1
3:00	Try: Oliff, Leatherbarrow; Con: Albert Laing		Try: Bernard Martin, Percy Fairall, Jim Rutherford, Max Hollingsworth, Tom Haywood; Con: Percy Fairall, Stan Robinson	Attendance: 9,000; Referee: Maurice Wetherill

=== 1940-1949 ===
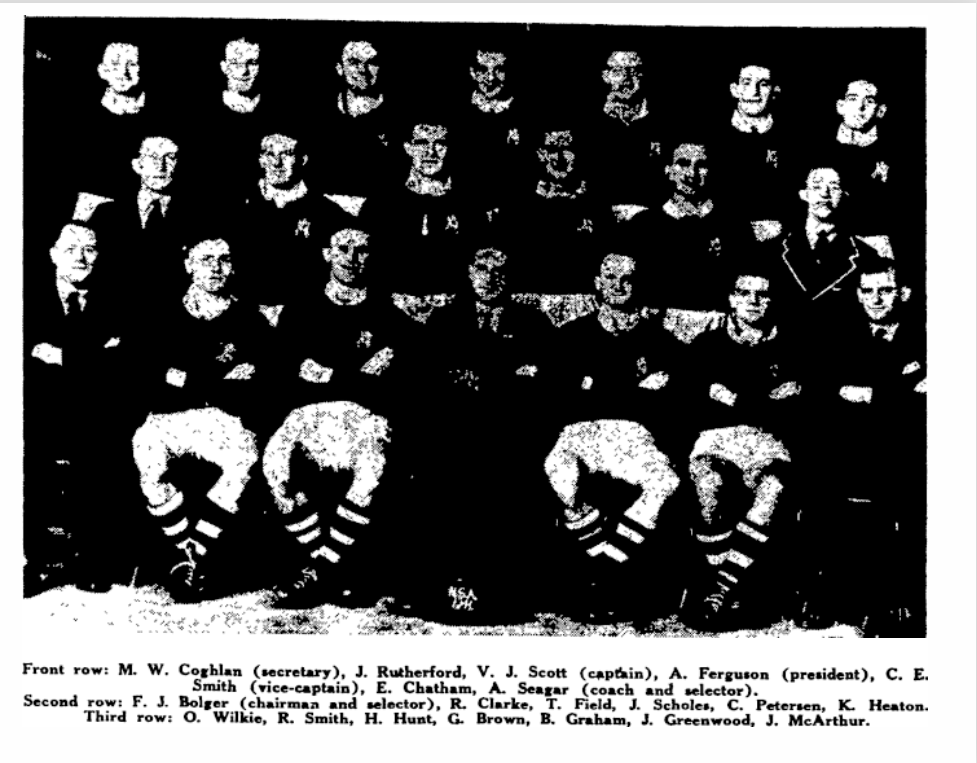
North Shore Albions Fox Memorial champions in 1941

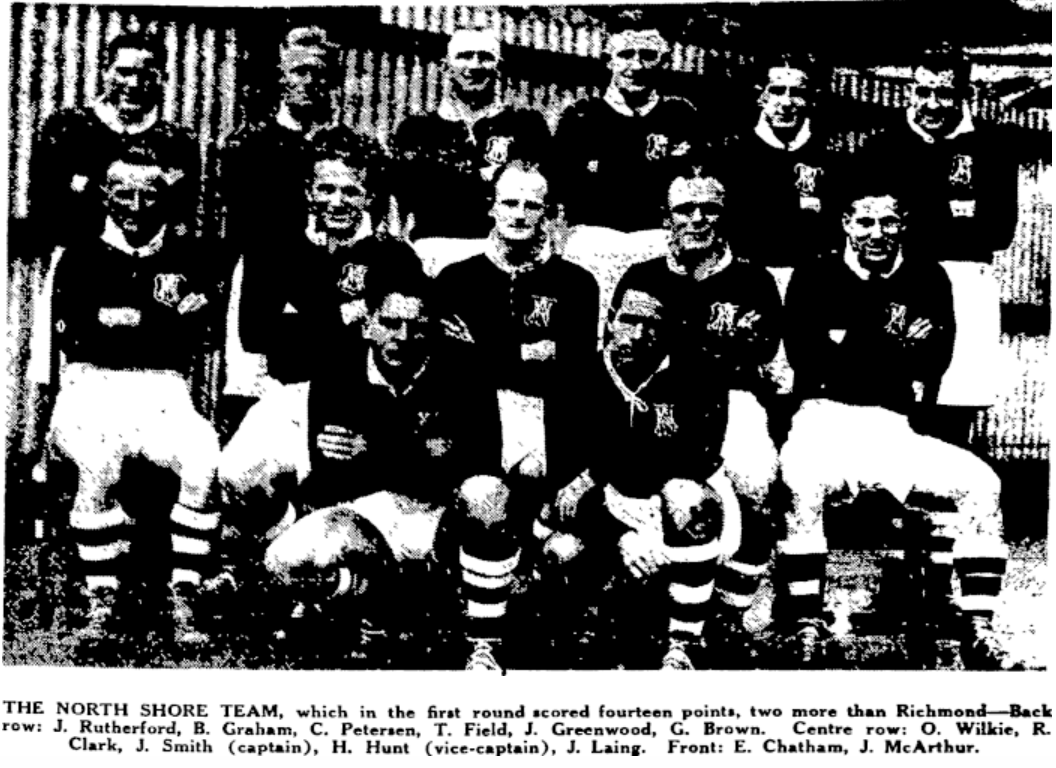
North Shore after winning the 1941 Rukutai Shield (awarded to the team leading after the first round).

In 1940 North Shore won the Stormont Shield for the fourth time in their history. They defeated Richmond Rovers 15–10 in the final at Carlaw Park in front of 5,000 spectators.

5 October	North Shore	15–10	Richmond	Carlaw Park 1
3:00	Try: Ted Scott, Graham, Davis; Con: Jack Smith; Pen: Jack Smith 2		Try: Dave Solomon, Jack McLeod; Con: Jack McLeod 2	Attendance: 5,000; Referee: G Kelly

North Shore won the Fox Memorial once again in 1941.

== Titles ==
They were particularly successful in their early years. They won the senior grade 6 times from 1913 to 1941, while they won the minor premiership (Rukutai Shield) 3 times from 1941 to 1955. As Auckland grew and the North Shore gentrified North Shore struggled to remain the power house it once was and it dropped down the grades. Its last notable title was the Norton Cup which they won in 1990 and 1991.

== Notable representatives ==
=== New Zealand representatives whilst with North Shore ===
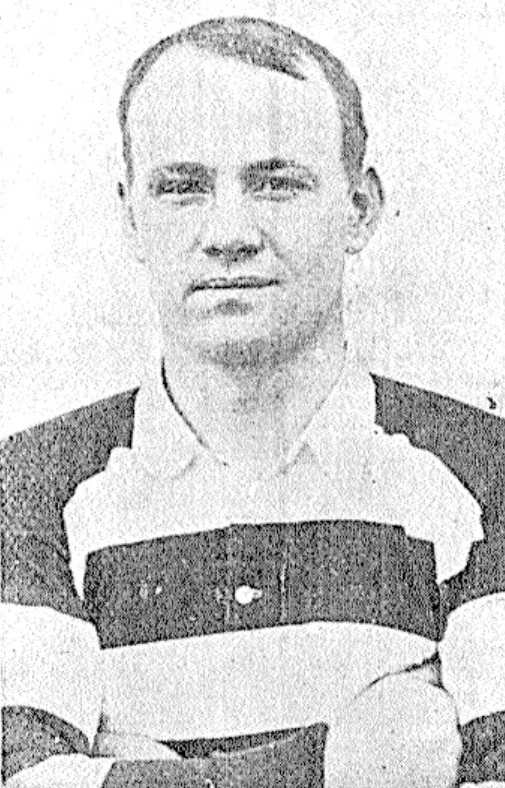
Ronald 'Scotchy' MacDonald

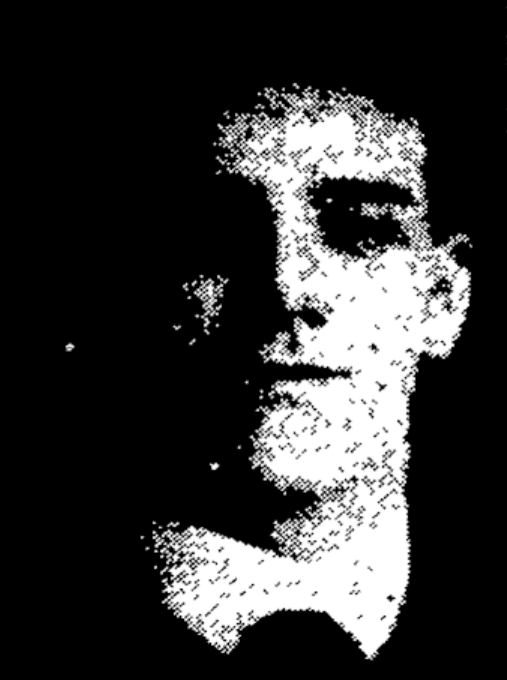
William Thomas Wynyard

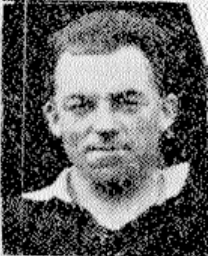
Neville St George

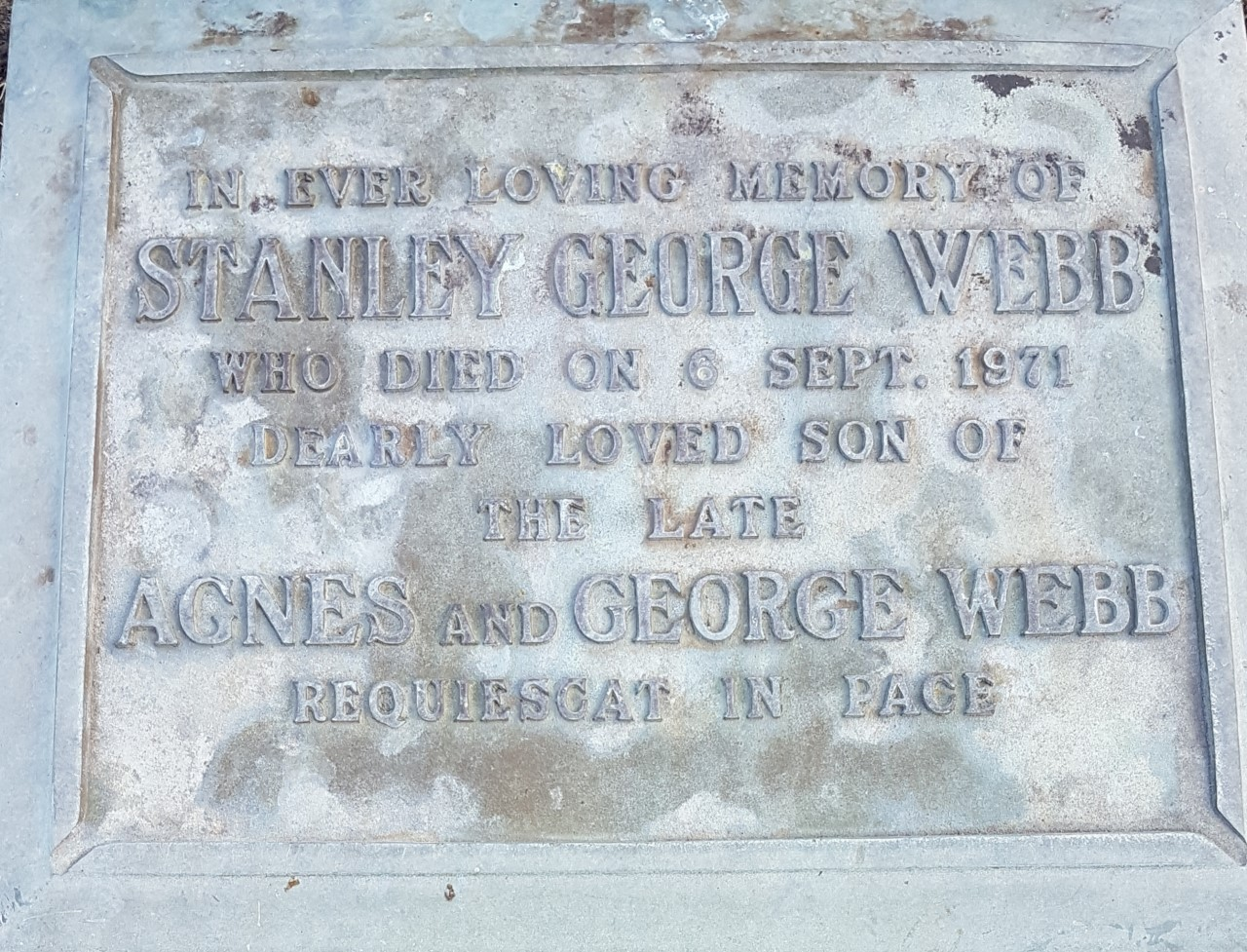
Grave of Stanley Webb in the Birkenhead/Glenfield Cemetery

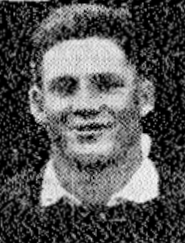
Len Scott

- Ronald MacDonald (1909: North Shore, 1909-11: New Zealand)
- Frederick Stanley Jackson (1910: North Shore, 1910: New Zealand)
- Jim Griffen (1909-19: North Shore, 1910: New Zealand)
- George Seagar (1909-20: North Shore, 1910–11: New Zealand)
- Stan Weston (1911-15: North Shore, 1912–14: New Zealand)
- Karl Ifwersen (1913: North Shore, 1913-20: New Zealand)
- Alfred Jackson (1909-12: North Shore, 1913: New Zealand)
- Stan Walters (1911-20: North Shore, 1913–21: New Zealand)
- Archie Waddell (1919: North Shore, 1919: New Zealand)
- Keith Helander (1919-21: North Shore, 1919: New Zealand)
- Bert Laing (1922-30: North Shore, 1919–25: New Zealand)
- Horace Dixon (1925-30: North Shore, 1925: New Zealand)
- Stan Webb (1922-28: North Shore, 1925–26: New Zealand)
- Neville St George (1921-30: North Shore, 1925: New Zealand)
- James Lawrence O'Brien (1921-28: North Shore, 1925: New Zealand)
- Len Scott (1926-40: North Shore, 1928–36: New Zealand)
- Albert Laing (1931-34: North Shore, 1932: New Zealand)
- Arthur Matthews (1917-18 & 1919-20: North Shore, 1919: New Zealand)
- Verdun Scott (1936-41: North Shore, 1939: New Zealand)
- Allan Seagar (1923-41: North Shore, 1930: New Zealand)
- Dick Smith (1931-35 & 1938-41: North Shore, 1932: New Zealand)
- Ross Jones (1938-39 & 1941: North Shore, 1939: New Zealand)
- Jack Smith (1937-46: North Shore, 1938–39: New Zealand)
- Ivor Stirling (1937-38: North Shore, 1939: New Zealand)

=== Other New Zealand representatives ===
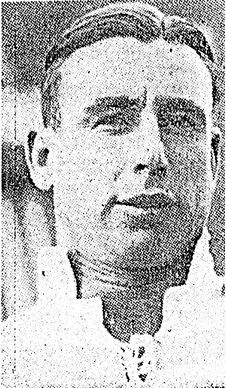
Bob Banham

A list of New Zealand representatives who played for North Shore prior to, or after leaving the club. Bob Banham joined the club as a coach after being recruited by Auckland Rugby League from Australia.

- Frank Woodward (1909: North Shore, 1910-11: New Zealand)
- Richard Wynyard (1909: North Shore, 1907-08: New Zealand)
- William Wynyard (1909-13: North Shore, 1907–08: New Zealand)
- Lyall Stewart (1926: North Shore, 1924: New Zealand)
- Bob Banham (1938: North Shore, 1939: New Zealand)
- Len Barchard (1933: North Shore, 1930: New Zealand)
- James Jones (1932: North Shore, 1930: New Zealand)
- Bert Leatherbarrow (1931-34: North Shore, 1939: New Zealand)

=== Other notable players ===
- Dennis Hale

== North Shore Senior Team Records (1910-1945, 1990, 1992-1994) ==
The season record for the most senior men's team in the club.

Season	Grade	Name	Played	W	D	L	PF	PA	PD	Pts	Position (Teams)
1910	1st Grade (Myers Cup)	North Shore Albions	8	1	1	6	41	119	-78	3	4th of 4
1911	1st Grade (Myers Cup)	North Shore Albions	7	3	0	4	80	68	88	6	3rd of 5
1912	1st Grade (Myers Cup)	North Shore Albions	10	5	1	4	129	111	18	14	2nd of 6
1913	1st Grade (Myers Cup)	North Shore Albions	7	5	1	1	80	55	25	11	1st of 6
1914	1st Grade (Myers Cup)	North Shore Albions	10	8	1	1	135	38	97	17	1st of 6
1915	1st Grade	North Shore Albions	9	4	1	4	76	83	-7	9	4th of 6
1916	1st Grade	North Shore Albions	10	7	1	2	134	57	77	15	2nd of 6
1917	1st Grade	North Shore Albions	9	4	0	5	84	91	-7	8	4th of 6
1918	1st Grade	North Shore Albions	3	0	0	3	2	30	-28	0	6th of 6 (withdrew after 3 games)
1919	1st Grade (Myers Cup)	North Shore Albions	10	4	1	5	95	94	1	9	5th of 8
1920	1st Grade (Myers Cup)	Devonport United	12	4	2	6	98	151	-53	10	5th of 7
1921	1st Grade (Monteith Shield)	Devonport United	7	1	0	6	54	132	-78	2	6th of 7
1922	1st Grade (Monteith Shield)	Devonport United	14	7	1	6	223	194	29	15	4th of 8
1923	1st Grade (Monteith Shield)	Devonport United	12	6	0	6	135	141	-6	12	4th of 7
1924	1st Grade (Monteith Shield)	Devonport United	16	11	1	4	272	191	81	23	2nd of 9 (lost 20-17 v Marist in a playoff)
1925	1st Grade (Monteith Shield)	Devonport United	12	5	0	7	174	207	-33	10	4th of 7
1926	1st Grade (Monteith Shield)	Devonport United	11	5	0	6	223	149	74	10	4th of 7
1927	1st Grade (Monteith Shield)	Devonport United	12	7	0	5	207	114	93	14	3rd of 7
1928	1st Grade (Monteith Shield)	Devonport United	12	9	0	3	224	149	18	18	1st of 7
1929	1st Grade (Monteith Shield)	Devonport United	15	11	1	3	236	113	123	23	2nd of 8
1930	1st Grade (Monteith Shield)	Devonport United	13	8	0	5	151	128	23	16	3rd of 8
1931	1st Grade (Fox Memorial)	Devonport United	12	10	0	2	178	92	86	20	2nd of 7
1932	1st Grade (Fox Memorial)	Devonport United	10	7	2	1	130	104	26	16	1st of 6
1933	1st Grade (Fox Memorial)	Devonport United	10	7	1	2	142	129	13	15	1st of 6
1934	1st Grade (Fox Memorial)	Devonport United	13	5	1	7	100	130	-30	11	4th of 6
1935	1st Grade (Fox Memorial)	Devonport United	12	5	2	5	150	154	-4	12	3rd of 7
1936	1st Grade (Fox Memorial)	Devonport United	14	6	4	4	184	150	34	16	3rd of 8
1937	1st Grade (Fox Memorial)	North Shore Albions	14	4	1	9	148	220	-72	9	6th of 8
1938	1st Grade (Fox Memorial)	North Shore Albions	15	6	0	9	202	221	-19	12	7th of 9
1939	1st Grade (Fox Memorial)	North Shore Albions	16	10	1	5	196	153	43	21	2nd of 9
1940	1st Grade (Fox Memorial)	North Shore Albions	16	11	0	5	263	161	102	22	2nd of 9
1941	1st Grade (Fox Memorial)	North Shore Albions	16	13	1	2	304	138	166	27	1st of 9
1942	1st Grade (Fox Memorial)	Marist-North Shore	15	4	0	11	126	237	-111	8	6th of 6
1943	1st Grade (Fox Memorial)	North Shore Albions	15	2	1	12	123	259	-136	5	9th of 9
1944	1st Grade (Fox Memorial)	North Shore Albions	18	5	2	11	158	207	-49	12	8th of 10
1945	1st Grade (Fox Memorial)	North Shore Albions	14	6	1	7	138	197	-59	12	7th of 10
-	Roope Rooster	North Shore Albions	3	3	0	0	57	39	18	-	W 17-15 v Pt Chevalier, W 17-12 v Mt Albert, W GF v Richmond 22–12
-	Stormont Shield	North Shore Albions	1	1	0	0	22	12	10	-	W 22-12 v Richmond
1990	Waste Management Division 3	North Shore Albions	21	19	0	2	610	221	276%	38	1st of 8
-	Playoffss	North Shore Albions	2	0	0	2	-	-	-	-	Lost major SF v Waitematā by 1 pt, lost major SF v Gelnfield
1992	Strand League Club Premier 2/3 Grading	North Shore Albions	13	4	0	9	207	379	54.6%	8	11th of 14
-	Strand League Club Premier 3	North Shore Albions	6	3	1	2	102	80	127.5%	7	3rd of 7
-	Playoffs	North Shore Albions	2	1	0	1	12	2	-	-	W v Ōtara 12–2 in minor SF, L v Glenfield in major SF
1993	Projex Premier 2/3 Grading	North Shore Albions	15	11	0	4	392	281	139.5%	22	3rd of 15
-	Projex Premier 2	North Shore Albions	7	3	0	4	115	180	63.9%	6	5th of 8
1994	Premier 2	North Shore Albions	26	18	1	7	654	409	159.9	37	5th of 14
-	Playoffs	North Shore Albions	2	1	0	1	34	21	161.9	-	W v Manurewa 22–6 in minor SF, L v Waitematā 12–15 in major SF
1910-45, 1990, 1992–94	TOTAL		547	293	32	222	8250	7027	-	607	

=== Top point scorers and try scorers (1909-1945) ===
Top point scorers
No	Player	Start	End	Games	T	C	P	DG	M	Pts
1	Jack Smith	1937	1945	90	20	124	102	2	0	516
2	Len Scott	1926	1940	138	104	2	0	0	0	316
3	Allan Seagar	1923	1941	163	50	56	15	1	0	294
4	Alf Scott	1919	1932	125	34	72	7	0	0	260
5	Dick Smith	1929	1941	64	26	45	24	1	0	218
6	Bert Laing	1922	1930	56	23	34	18	0	1	175
7	Verdun Scott	1936	1946	82	9	25	23	3	0	129
8	Jack Paul	1912	1916	49	2	30	27	1	2	126
9	Roy Clark	1940	1945	52	16	20	14	2	0	120
10	Horace Hunt	1931	1945	153	37	0	3	0	0	117
11	Leslie O'Leary	1928	1931	37	20	17	6	0	0	106
12	J McArthur	1940	1944	78	23	13	5	0	0	105
13	Stan Webb	1922	1928	73	29	8	0	0	0	103
14	Tony Milicich	1935	1937	34	7	30	10	0	0	101
15	Ted Scott	1931	1942	150	32	2	0	0	0	100
16	Ernest Ruby	1926	1932	98	28	6	0	0	0	96
17	Stan Walters	1911	1920	72	30	1	1	0	0	94
18	Albert Laing	1931	1934	45	3	29	12	0	0	91
19	Cyril Nicholson	1915	1921	51	27	3	0	0	0	87
20	Arthur Sowter	1932	1940	100	24	4	2	0	0	84
21	George Seagar	1909	1920	63	19	11	2	0	0	83
22	J Beattie	1927	1930	44	25	1	0	0	0	77
23	Clarrie Petersen	1940	1945	33	24	0	1	0	0	74
24	Jack Laing	1941	1944	32	7	13	11	0	0	69
25	Bruce Graham	1938	1945	59	22	1	0	0	0	68
26	Horace Dixon	1940	1945	64	22	0	0	0	0	66
27=	Harry Douglas	1920	1927	60	21	0	0	0	0	63
27=	Charles Hand	1921	1925	34	7	10	10	0	0	63
29=	G Rhodes	1927	1936	110	20	1	0	0	0	62
26=	Lindsay Simons	1927	1942	67	0	19	10	2	0	62

== Club Titles ==
=== Head to Head records ===
Opponent	Start	End	Games	Wins	Draws	Losses	For	Against
Combined Town	1909	-	1	1	0	0	26	10
Grafton Athletic	1914	1922	16	12	1	3	157	93
Eden Ramblers	1911	1913	5	5	0	0	111	14
City Rovers-Newton Rangers	1917	-	1	1	0	0	22	3
King Country	1920	-	2	1	0	1	23	13
Māngere United	1924	-	2	2	0	0	56	16
Huntly	1929	-	1	0	0	1	8	20
Ellerslie United-Otahuhu Rovers	1931	-	2	2	0	0	35	18
Eastern Suburbs	1931	-	1	0	0	1	27	41
St. George	1931	-	1	0	0	1	8	19
Northland	1934	-	1	1	0	0	17	11
Whangarei	1935	-	1	1	0	0	22	16
TOTAL	1909	1935	34	26	1	7	512	274

=== Grade championships and lower grade knockout competitions (1910-1944) ===
- 1911 Third Grade Open
- 1912 Fourth Grade
- 1913 First Grade
- 1914 First Grade
- 1916 Fifth Grade
- 1917 Fifth Grade & Sixth Grade A
- 1918 Third Grade Open
- 1923 Fourth Grade A
- 1926 Second Grade
- 1927 Second Grade (Wright Cup), Second Grade knockout (Foster Shield). Fourth Grade knockout, and Sixth Grade knockout (Hammill Cup).
- 1928 First Grade & Second Grade
- 1929 Second Grade, Third Grade Intermediate, & Fourth Grade A
- 1931 Reserve Grade
- 1932 First Grade
- 1933 First Grade & Sixth Grade A
- 1936 Schoolboys Intermediate
- 1937 Seventh Grade
- 1941 First Grade

=== Other titles ===
- 1915 Roope Rooster
- 1930 Stormont Shield
- 1931 Roope Rooster, Stormont Shield, & Norton Cup
- 1933 Stormont Shield
- 1940 Stormont Shield
- 1945 Roope Rooster & Stormont Shield
- 1954 Roope Rooster & Stormont Shield
- 1973 Norton Cup
- 1990 Norton Cup
- 1991 Norton Cup

== Gallery ==
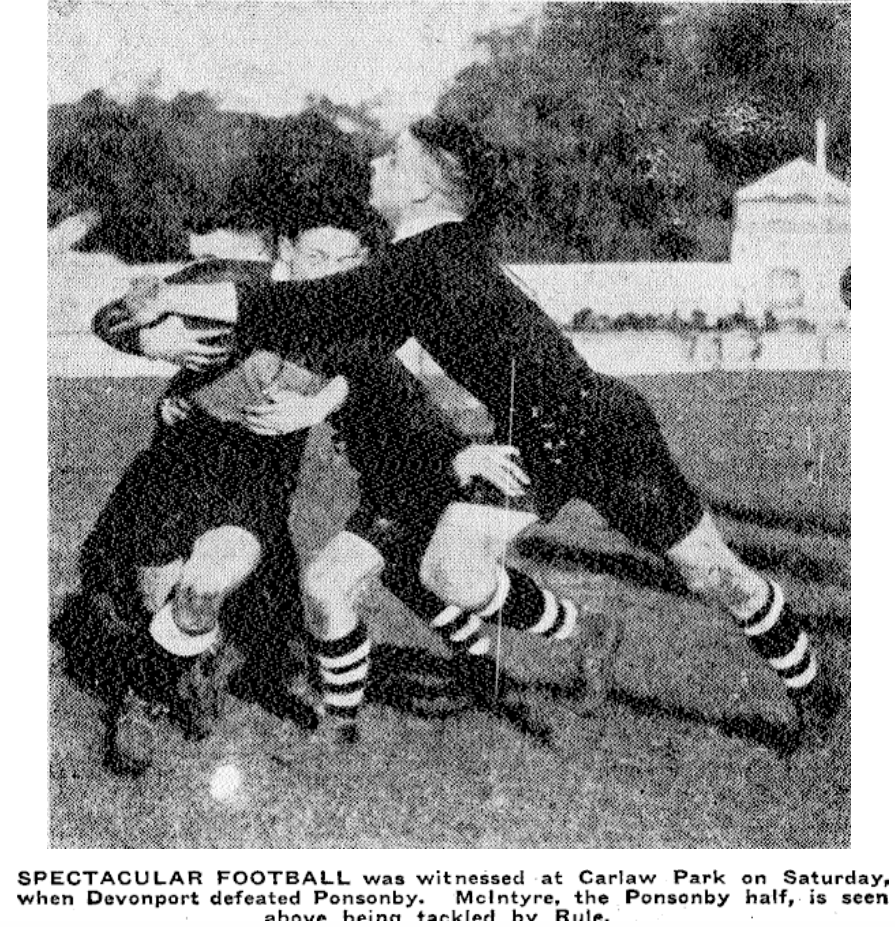
Devonport v Ponsonby, 15 June 1919

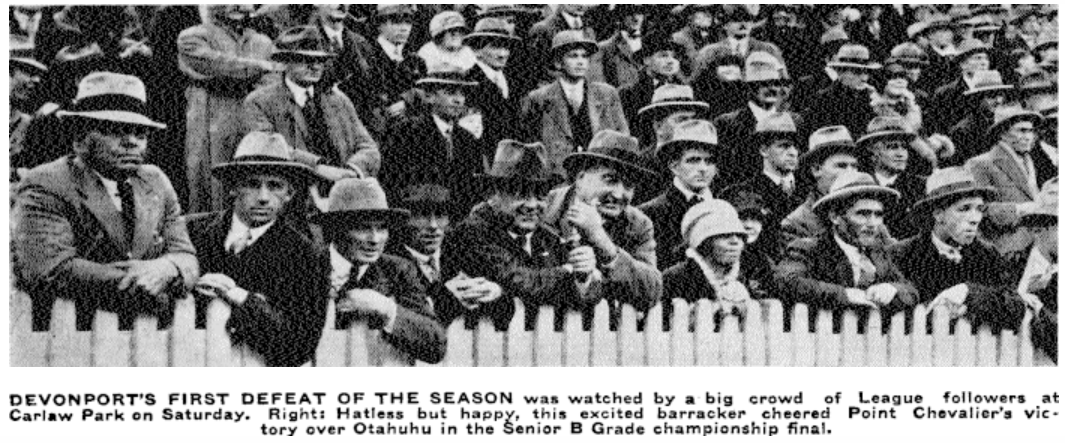
Crowd watching Devonport at Carlaw Park on 6 July 1919

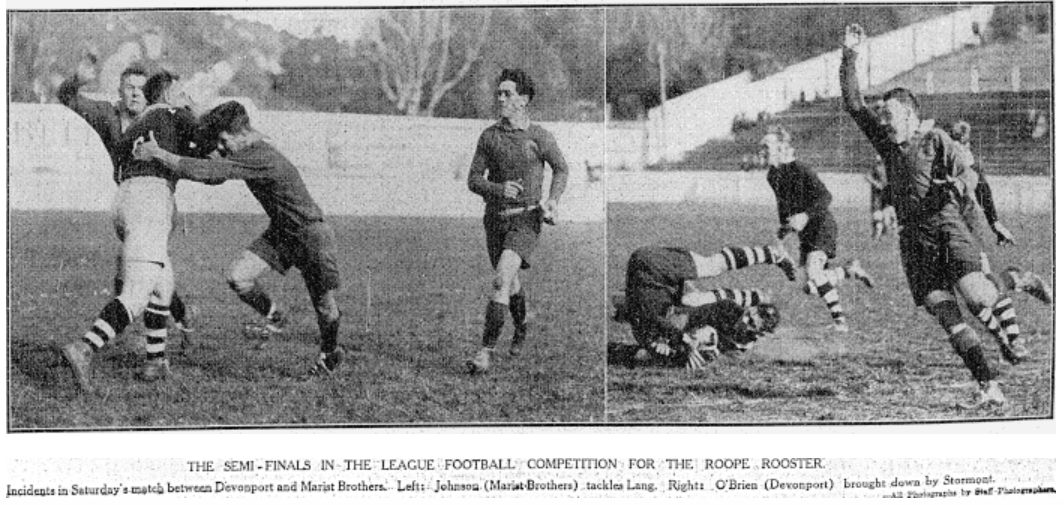
Devonport v Marist, Roope Rooster match in 1926 at Carlaw Park.

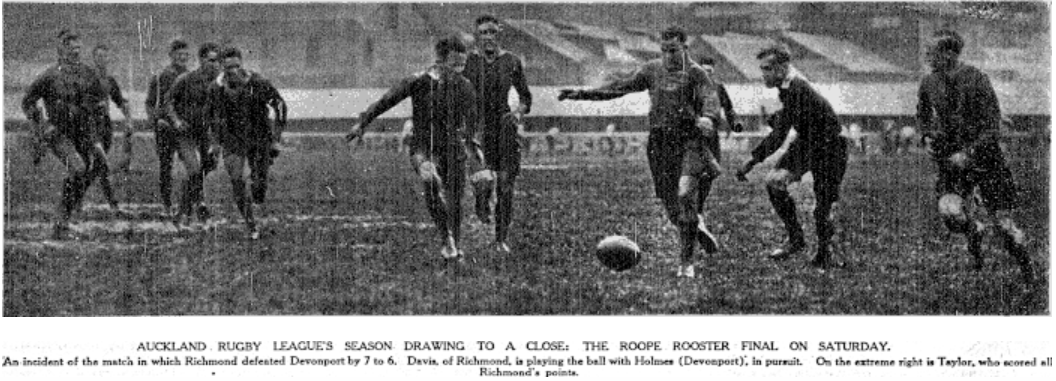
Devonport v Richmond, 17 September 1927

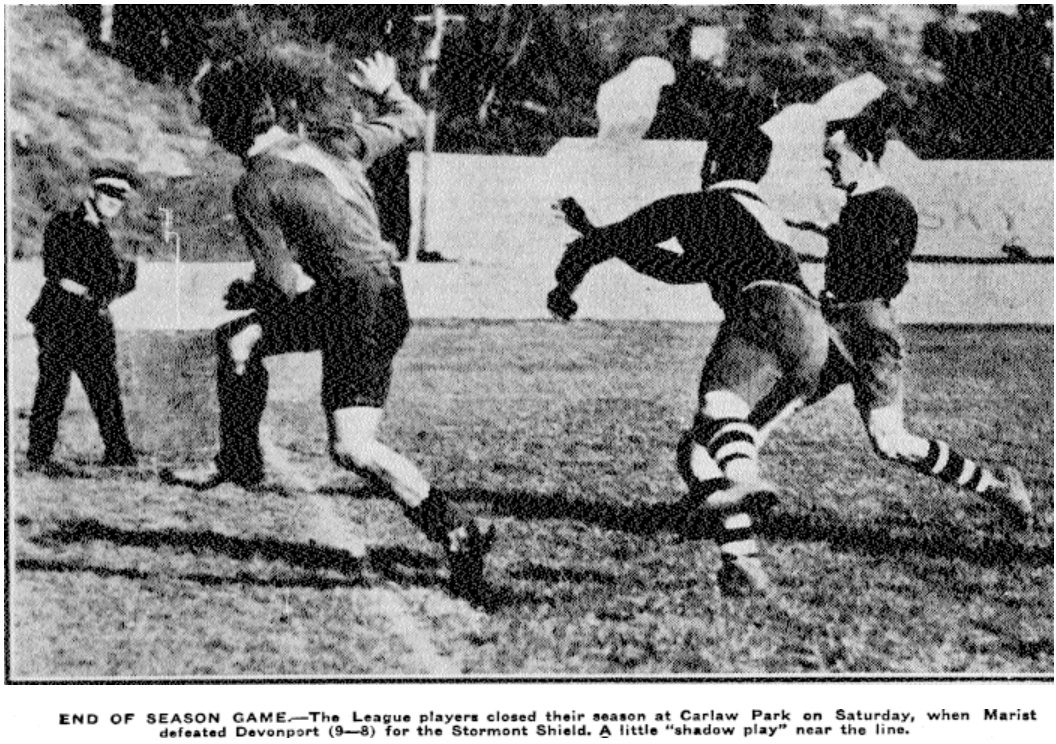
Devonport v Marist (Stormont Shield final), 13 October 1928

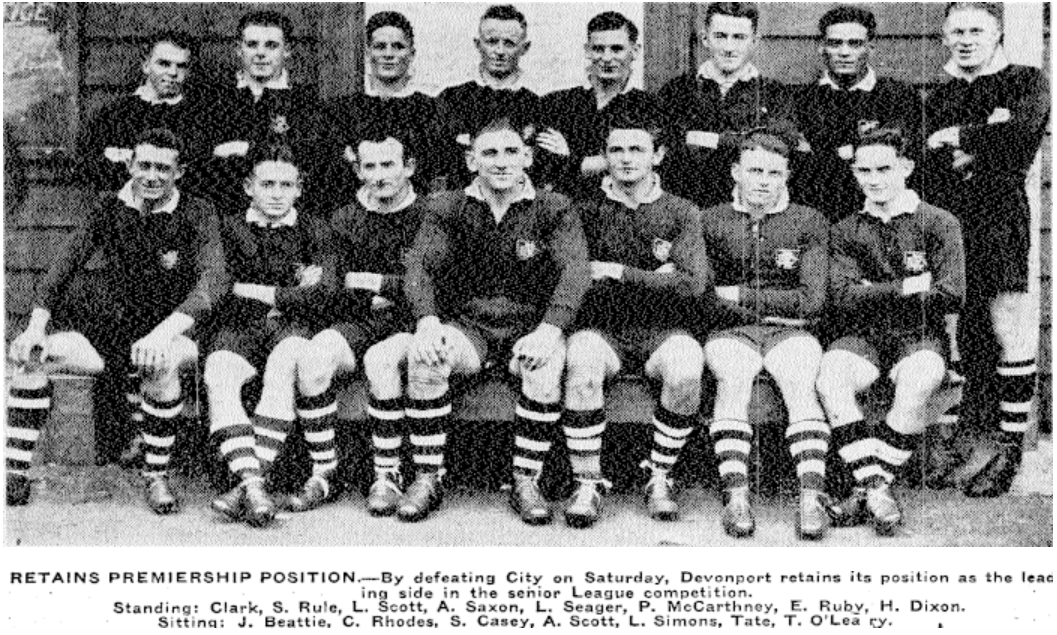
Devonport senior side of 1929

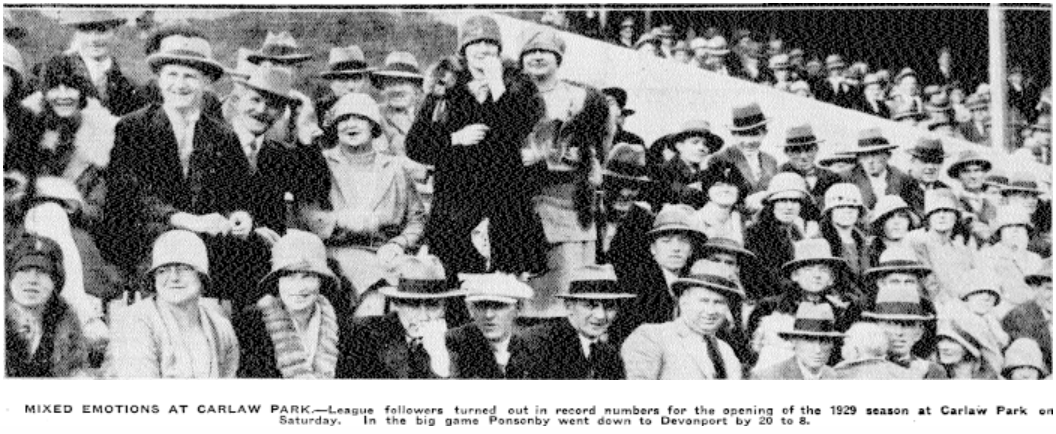
Devonport v Ponsonby, 29 April 1929 at Carlaw Park

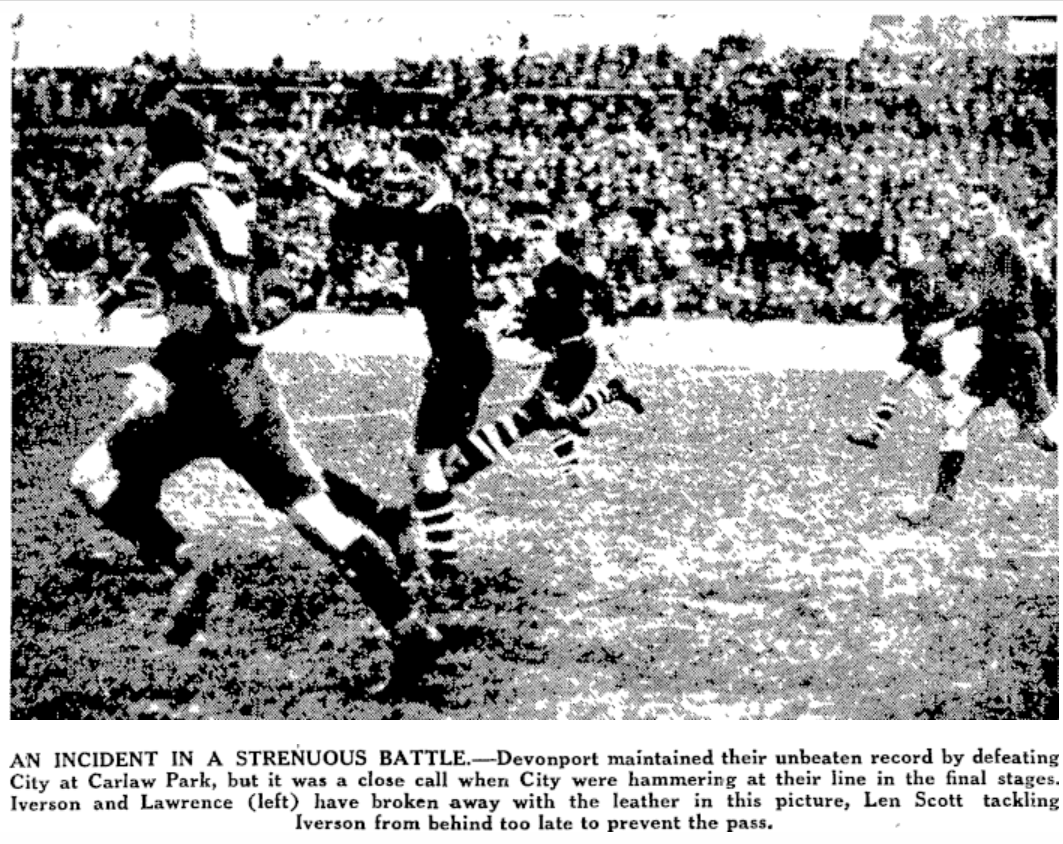
Devonport v City Rovers, 18 May 1929

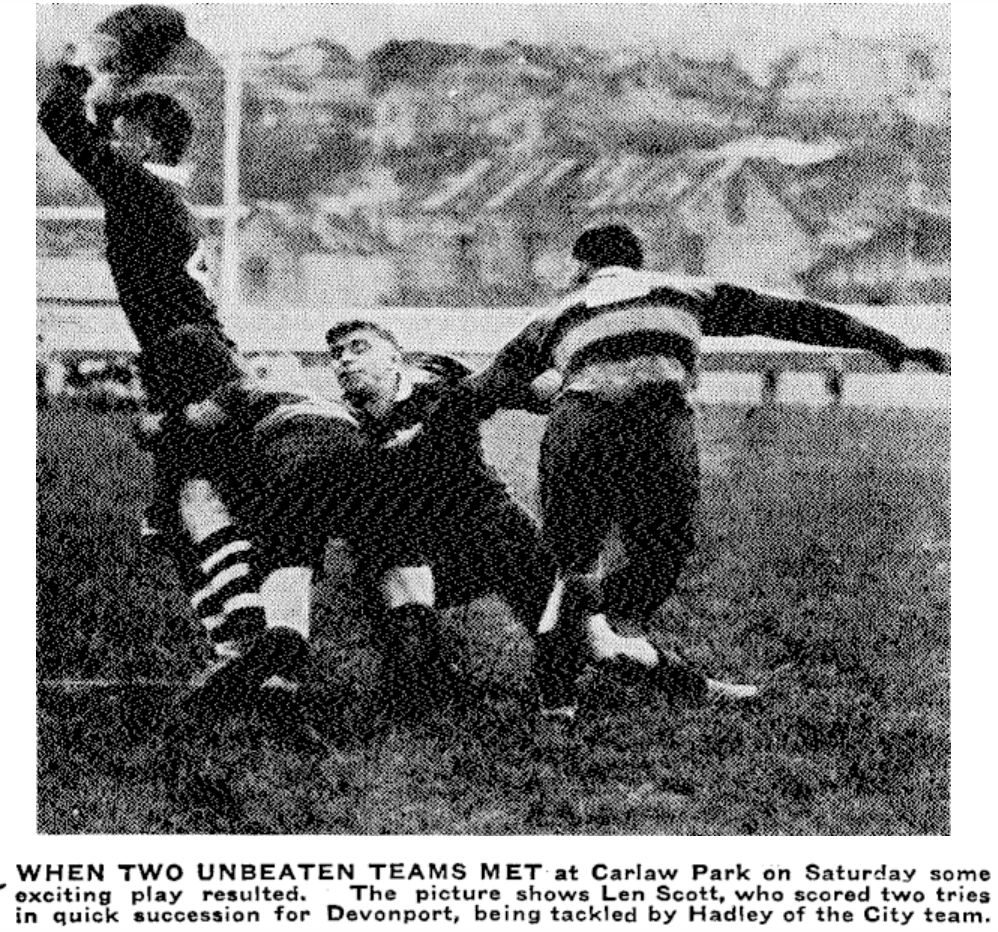
Devonport v City Rovers, 18 May 1929

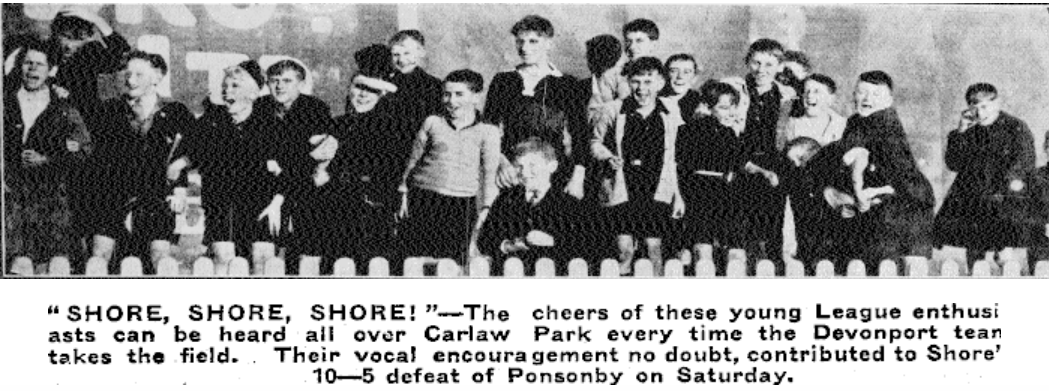
Devonport supporters at the match v Ponsonby on 15 June 1929

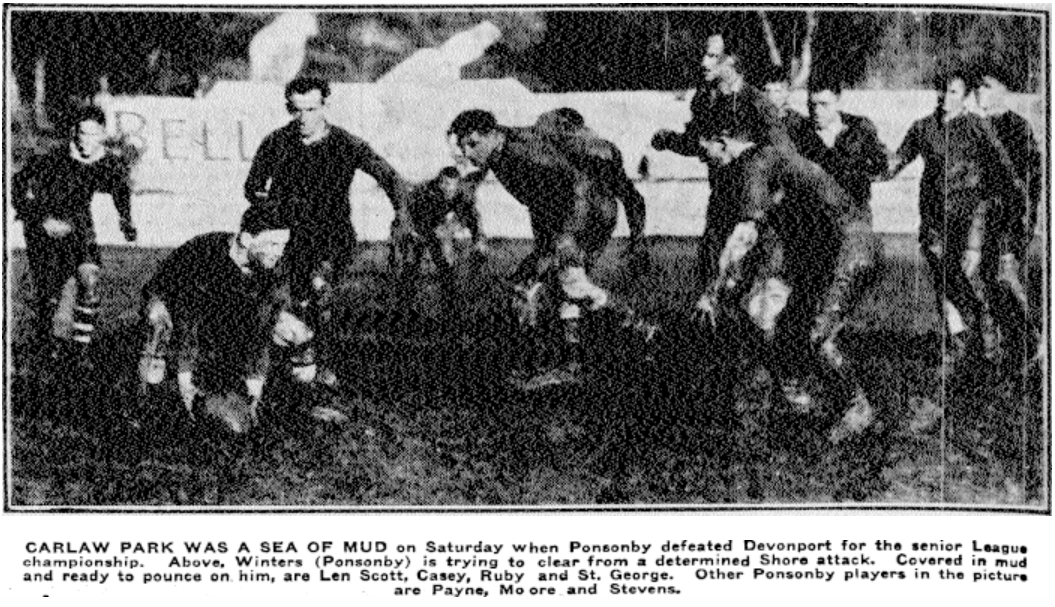
Ponsonby v Devonport, 10 August 1929

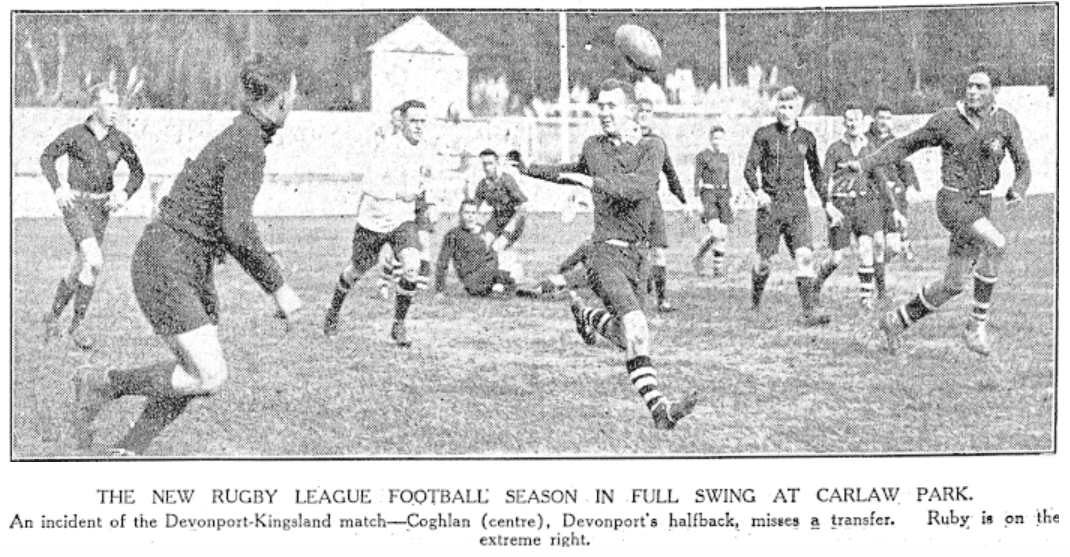
Devonport v Kingsland, 5 May 1930

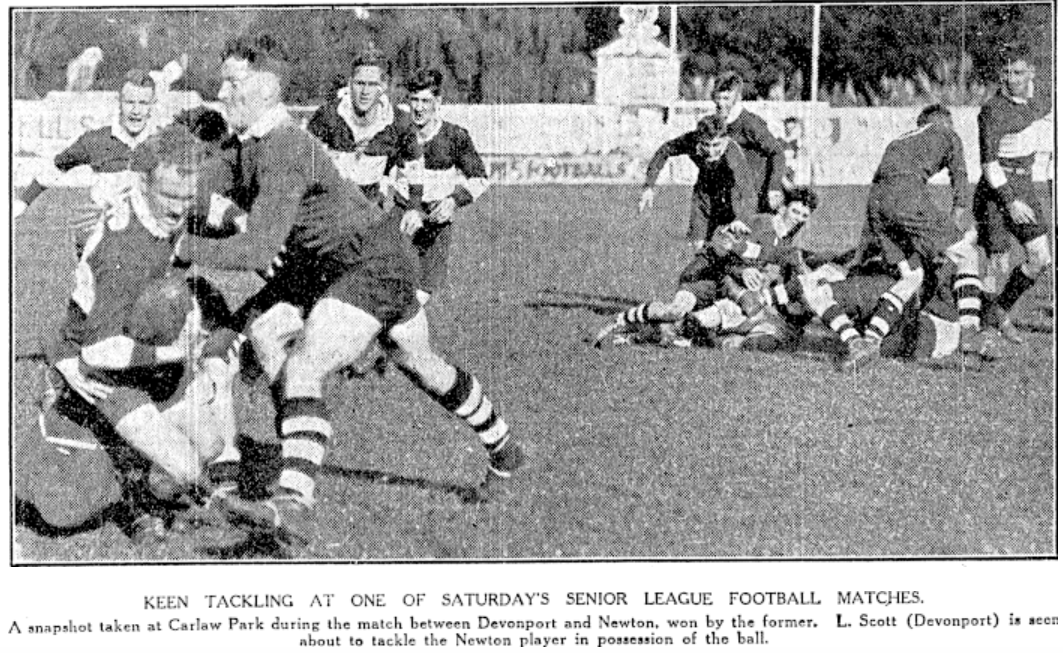
Devonport v Newton, 11 May 1931

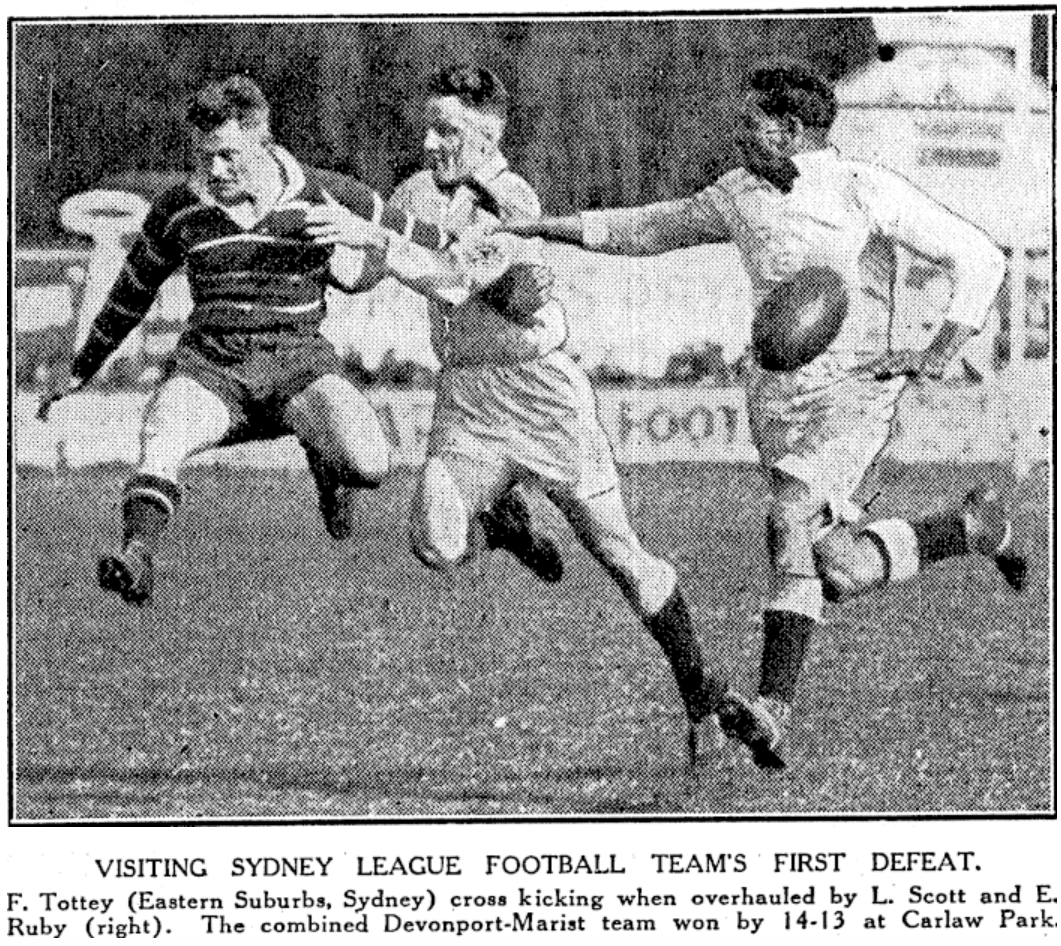
Combined Devonport-Marist side v Eastern Suburbs (Sydney), 17 October 1931

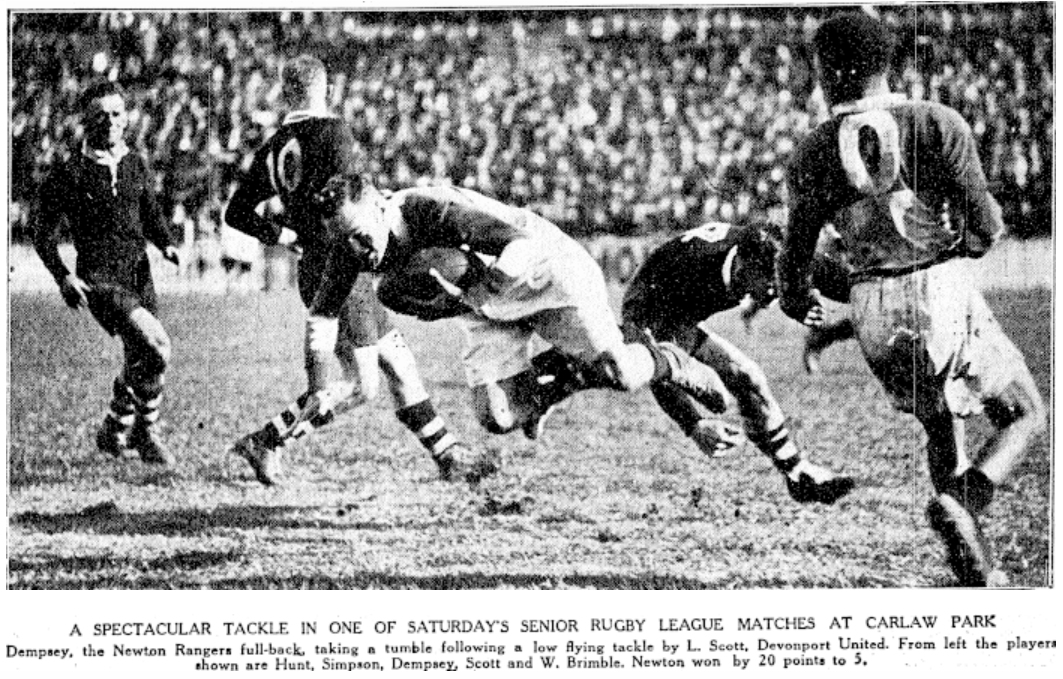
Devonport v Newton, 18 May 1935

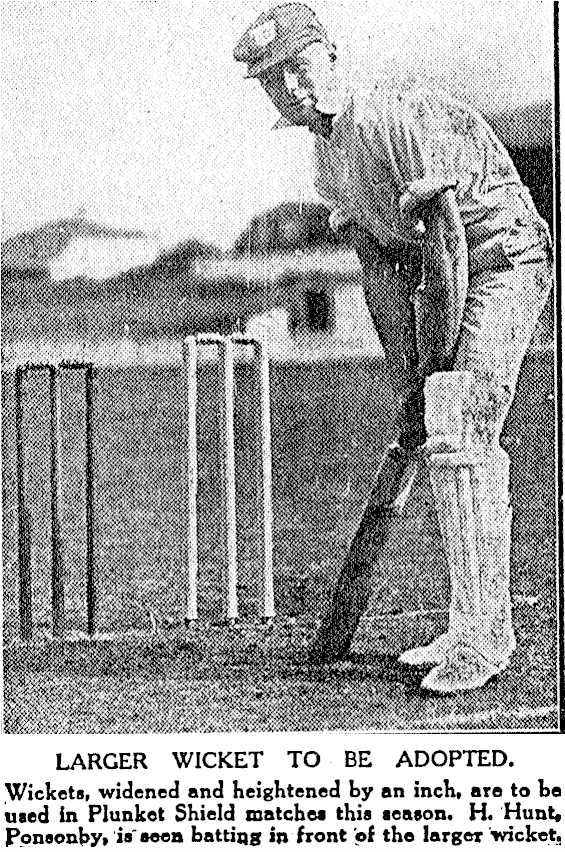
Horace Hunt, North Shore Albions captain in the early 1940s
