= Verdun Scott =

New Zealand sportsman (1916–1980)

- Rugby league career
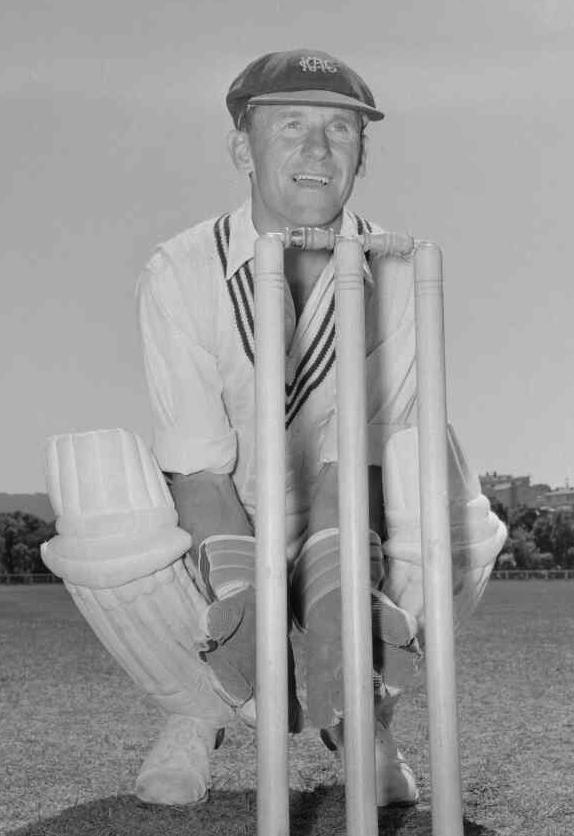
- Scott in 1959

Personal information
- Full name: Verdun John Scott
- Born: 31 July 1916 Devonport, Auckland, New Zealand
- Died: 2 August 1980 (aged 64) Devonport, Auckland, New Zealand

Playing information
- Position: Utility Back
Club
| Years | Team | Pld | T | G | FG | P |
|---|---|---|---|---|---|---|
| 1936–41 | North Shore Albions | 82 | 8 | 48 | 3 | 126 |
| 1941 | Central (Wellington) | 1 | 1 | 1 | 0 | 5 |
| 1941 | Army | 1 | 1 | 0 | 0 | 3 |
| 1941 | Miramar | 1 | 0 | 0 | 0 | 0 |
| 1945–46 | North Shore Albions | 2 | 1 | 0 | 0 | 3 |
| | Total | 87 | 11 | 49 | 3 | 137 |
Representative
| Years | Team | Pld | T | G | FG | P |
| 1929 | Auckland Schoolboys | 1 | 0 | 0 | 0 | 0 |
| 1938–40 | Auckland Pakehā | 3 | 0 | 2 | 1 | 6 |
| 1939 | New Zealand | 1 |
- Cricket career

Personal information
- Nickname: Scotty, the Scotsman
- Batting: Right-handed
- Bowling: Right-arm bowler

International information
- National side: New Zealand (1946–1952)
- Test debut (cap 39): 29 March 1946 v Australia
- Last Test: 15 February 1952 v West Indies

Career statistics
| Competition | Test | First-class |
|---|---|---|
| Matches | 10 | 80 |
| Runs scored | 458 | 5,620 |
| Batting average | 28.62 | 49.73 |
| 100s/50s | 0/3 | 16/23 |
| Top score | 84 | 204 |
| Balls bowled | 18 | 738 |
| Wickets | 0 | 10 |
| Bowling average | – | 27.10 |
| 5 wickets in innings | – | 0 |
| 10 wickets in match | – | 0 |
| Best bowling | – | 3/22 |
| Catches/stumpings | 7/– | 42/– |
- Source: Cricinfo, 1 April 2017
- Relatives: Alfred Scott (brother); Len Scott (cousin)

Verdun John Scott (31 July 1916 – 2 August 1980) was a sportsman who represented New Zealand in both Test cricket and rugby league. As of 2022 he is the only player to have done so.

== Rugby league career ==
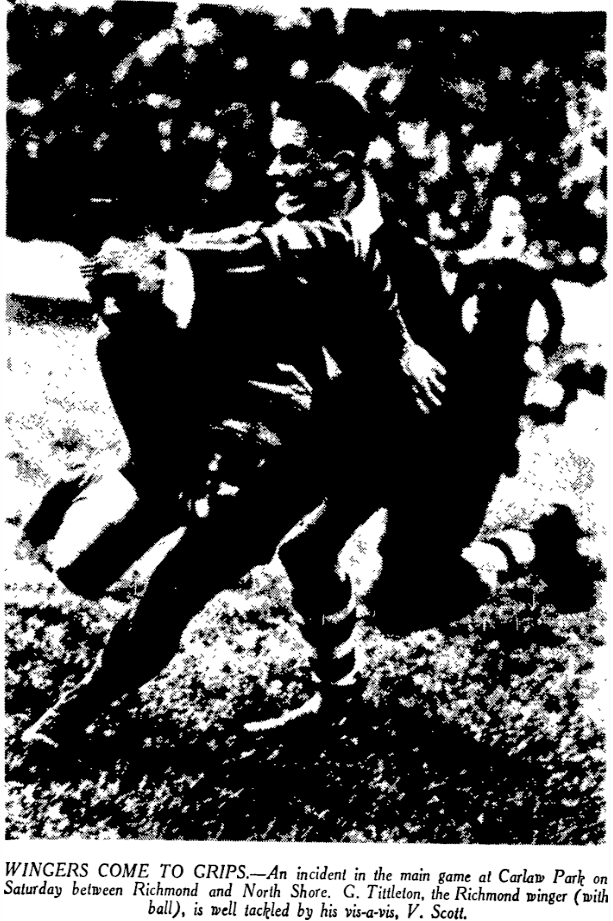
Verdun Scott playing for North Shore against Richmond at Carlaw Park on May 1, 1937. He is tackling George Tittleton.

Scott began playing rugby league in the late 1920s. In 1929 he was playing in the primary schools competition favouring league over soccer where he had previously represented "Auckland B". He was selected for the Auckland rugby league schoolboys representative side at fullback for a game against North Auckland schoolboys on September 5 at Kamo. In league Scott quickly made the Auckland rugby league team and in 1939 was selected for the New Zealand national rugby league team touring squad to England. He played in one Test match before the start of World War II cut short the tour. He was one of five players who did not play in the two club matches the Kiwis played before the tour was cancelled. On one occasion he played on Carlaw Park for North Shore and after the game was completed raced to Eden Park where he scored 22 runs in the last match of the cricket season. In mid 1941 Scott was at the Trentham Camp training before going to war and turned out for the Central club in a match along with games for an Army side against Petone and as a guest player for Miramar against the touring Richmond club side from Auckland at the Basin Reserve. He returned from the war in 1945 and made his return to the North Shore side in their Stormont Shield win over Otahuhu on October 20.

== Second World War ==
During World War II, Scott served in Egypt and Italy. After the war, Scott was part of the North Shore Albions side that won the Auckland Rugby League's Roope Rooster and Stormont Shield in 1945.

== Cricket career ==
A burly and upright right-handed opening batsman with little or no backlift, Scott started his cricketing career by scoring a century on first-class debut for Auckland versus Canterbury in 1937–38. He made his Test debut against Australia in the match arranged after the Second World War in March 1946 and was top scorer in the first innings with 14 out of a total of just 42. New Zealand totalled just 96 runs in the two completed innings.

He was one of the more reliable batsmen on the New Zealand tour of England in 1949, and played in all four Tests. Though his top score in these games was only 60, he and left-handed opening partner Bert Sutcliffe gave the touring team a solid start in three matches, with partnerships of 122, 89 and 121. He later played in home Tests against England and the West Indies, reserving his best Test performance for his last game, when he made 84 out of New Zealand total of 160 in reply to the West Indies 546 for six wickets, a four-hour innings that took up enough time for bad light and rain to come to his side's rescue. In all, he played ten Tests for New Zealand.

Scott played for Auckland from 1937–38 to 1952–53. He was a prolific scorer in Plunket Shield cricket, and in all first-class cricket averaged only just under 50 runs per innings. His highest score was 204 against Otago in 1947–48.

== Later life and death ==
Scott was a jewelry manufacturer by trade. He died at Devonport, New Zealand, on 2 August 1980.

== See also ==
- List of cricket and rugby league players
