= Tom Wright (1930s rugby league) =

Australian RL coach and former rugby league footballer

Personal information
- Full name: Thomas Edward Wright
- Born: 7 December 1900 Winton, Queensland, Australia
- Died: 13 January 1938 (aged 37)

Playing information
- Position: Centre, Halfback
Club
Years	Team	Pld	T	G	FG	P
1931	North Sydney	14	4	1	0	14
Representative
Years	Team	Pld	T	G	FG	P
1928–29	Queensland	2	0	0	0	0
1931	NSW City	1	0	0	0	0

Coaching information
Club
Years	Team	Gms	W	D	L	W%
1931	North Sydney	14	6	0	8	43
- Source: As of 13 February 2019

Tom Wright was an Australian rugby league footballer who played for North Sydney in the New South Wales Rugby League premiership competition. Wright was captain-coach for Norths during the 1931 season.

== Footnotes ==
- Whiticker, Alan; Hudson, Glen (2007). The Encyclopedia of Rugby League Players. Wetherill Park, New South Wales: Gary Allen Pty Ltd. p. 609. ISBN 978-1-877082-93-1.

Sporting positions
Preceded by Tedda Courtney; 1930	Coach North Sydney; 1931	Succeeded by Arthur Edwards; 1933
