= Steve Hardy (rugby league) =

Australian rugby league footballer

Personal information
- Full name: Steve Hardy
- Born: 3 December 1961 (age 63); Sydney, New South Wales, Australia

Playing information
- Position: Lock, Second-row
Club
Years	Team	Pld	T	G	FG	P
1982–83	Cronulla-Sutherland	24	3	18	0	48
1984–91	Eastern Suburbs	100	7	0	0	28
	Total	124	10	18	0	76
- Source: As of 18 January 2023
- Relatives: Nelson Hardy (grandfather)

Steve Hardy is an Australian former professional rugby league footballer who played in the 1980s and 1990s. He played for Eastern Suburbs and Cronulla-Sutherland in the NSWRL competition.

== Playing career ==
Hardy made his first grade debut for Cronulla in round 2 of the 1982 NSWRFL season against Penrith at Penrith Park. Hardy played a total of 24 games for Cronulla over two seasons before signing with Eastern Suburbs. Hardy would go on to play 100 matches for Easts over the next eight years. Hardy went his entire career without playing a single finals game.
