= Alfred Scott (New Zealand cricketer) =

Sportsman (1901–1984)

Personal information
- Full name: Alfred Henry Scott
- Born: 28 October 1901; Auckland, New Zealand
- Died: 5 January 1984 (aged 82); Auckland, New Zealand
- Batting: Right-handed
- Role: Wicket-keeper
- Relatives: Verdun Scott (brother); Len Scott (cousin)
- Source: ESPNcricinfo, 20 June 2016

Alfred Scott
Playing information
- Position: Second-row, Prop
Club
Years	Team	Pld	T	G	FG	P
1919–31	North Shore Albions		33	75	0	249
Representative
Years	Team	Pld	T	G	FG	P
1922–29	Auckland	8	1	6	0	15
- As of 1 March 2025

Alfred Henry Scott (28 October 1901 – 5 January 1984) was a New Zealand cricketer. He played three first-class matches for Auckland between 1925 and 1928.

Born at Auckland in 1901, Scott played club cricket for the North Shore and Akarana clubs. He made his representative debut for Auckland in a January 1926 Plunket Shield match against Canterbury at Eden Park. The following January he played against Wellington at the Basin Reserve, before making his final first-class appearance in January 1928 against Canterbury. In his three matches he scored a total of 30 runs and took two wickets.

Scott also played rugby league for North Shore Albions from 1919 to 1931, and represented Auckland. His debut was against South Auckland (Waikato) at Steele Park in Hamilton on 2 October 1922. His brother was New Zealand rugby league and Test cricketer Verdun Scott, while his cousin Len Scott represented New Zealand at rugby league.

Scott died at Auckland in January 1984. He was aged 82.
