= Hilton Delaney =

Australian rugby league footballer

Personal information
- Full name: Hilton William Delaney
- Born: 7 June 1908 Narrabri, New South Wales, Australia
- Died: 7 September 1981 (aged 73) Zetland, New South Wales, Australia

Playing information
- Position: Centre, Wing
Club
Years	Team	Pld	T	G	FG	P
1928	St. George	14	3	0	0	9
1929–30	University	19	7	0	0	21
1931–33	Eastern Suburbs	24	16	0	0	48
1937	South Sydney	1	0	0	0	0
	Total	58	26	0	0	78
Representative
Years	Team	Pld	T	G	FG	P
1933	New South Wales	2	3	0	0	9

Hilton Delaney (1908-1981) was an Australian professional rugby league footballer who played in the New South Wales Rugby League (NSWRL) competition.

== Playing career ==
A Winger from Narrabri, New South Wales, Delaney played for St George in 1928 (14 matches), University in 1929-1930 (19 matches), Eastern Suburbs in 1931–33 (24 matches), and South Sydney in 1937 (1 match).

Delaney was a try scorer for Eastern Suburbs in the 1931 and 1932 semi-finals. While playing for the Tri_colours in 1933 Delaney was chosen to represent NSW.

== Death ==
Delaney died on 7 September 1981.
