= 1931 Eastern Suburbs season =

← 1930	1932 →

The 1931 Eastern Suburbs season was the 24th in the club's history. They competed in the New South Wales Rugby Football League's 1931 season.

== Ladder ==
	Team	Pld	W	D	L	B	PF	PA	PD	Pts
1	Eastern Suburbs	14	12	0	2	1	339	121	+218	24
2	South Sydney	14	9	0	5	1	250	176	+74	18
3	Western Suburbs	14	9	0	5	1	220	227	-7	18
4	St. George	14	8	0	6	1	178	183	-5	16
5	North Sydney	14	6	0	8	1	143	198	-55	12
6	Newtown	14	5	0	9	1	205	194	+11	10
7	Balmain	14	5	0	9	1	133	205	-72	10
8	University	14	2	0	12	1	135	299	-164	4

== Highlights ==
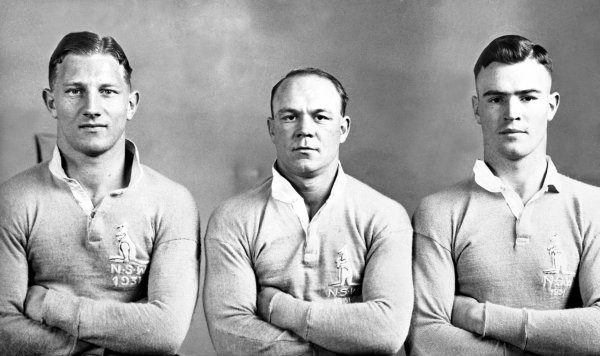
Three of Easts' players selected to represent New South Wales in 1931.

- Minor premiership
- Runners Up
- Jack Lynch was the leading Point and Try scorer in the New South Wales Rugby League competition.
- Club Championship
- 3rd grade title

Preceded by 1930	Season; 1931	Succeeded by 1932
