= Jack Morrison (rugby league) =

Australian rugby league footballer

Personal information
- Full name: John Harold Morrison
- Born: 26 July 1905; Sydney, New South Wales, Australia
- Died: 17 August 1994 (aged 89); Coffs Harbour, New South Wales, Australia

Playing information
- Position: Centre, Wing, Five-eighth
Club
Years	Team	Pld	T	G	FG	P
1931–33	South Sydney	35	8	4	0	32
1935–36	Canterbury-Bankstown	18	3	1	0	11
	Total	53	11	5	0	43
Representative
Years	Team	Pld	T	G	FG	P
1932	New South Wales	1	0	0	0	0
- Source: As of 21 February 2019

Jack Morrison (1905−1994) was an Australian rugby league footballer who played in the 1930s for South Sydney and Canterbury-Bankstown. Morrison was a foundation player for Canterbury-Bankstown and the club's first captain.

== Playing career ==
Morrison was initially a Rugby Union player and was recruited by Souths from Randwick DRUFC.

Morrison began his first grade career with South Sydney in 1931. Morrison made 14 appearances in his debut season including playing at centre in Souths 1931 grand final victory over arch rivals Eastern Suburbs.

The following year, Morrison played in the 1932 grand final loss against Western Suburbs. The rules at the time allowed South Sydney to challenge Wests to a rematch as they finished higher on the ladder. Morrison did not play in the grand final rematch as Souths defeated Wests 19–12 to win their 10th premiership.

In 1935, Morrison joined newly admitted Canterbury-Bankstown and played in the club first ever game against North Sydney at North Sydney Oval on 25 April 1935. Morrison had the honor being the club's first captain and is listed as player number 1 on Canterbury-Bankstown's Honour Roll.

In 1936, Morrison played 12 games for the club as they finished equal second and qualified for their first finals campaign.

At representative level, Morrison represented New South Wales in 1932 and New South Wales Police in 1936.
