= Billy Hong =

Australian rugby league footballer

Personal information
- Full name: William Hong
- Born: 23 May 1904 Sydney, New South Wales, Australia
- Died: 15 October 1983 (aged 79)

Playing information
- Position: Fullback, Wing
Club
Years	Team	Pld	T	G	FG	P
1929–32	Eastern Suburbs	47	1	0	0	3
Representative
Years	Team	Pld	T	G	FG	P
1931	New South Wales	2	0	0	0	0
1931	NSW City	1	0	0	0	0
- Source: As of 14 March 2019

Billy Hong was an Australian professional rugby league footballer who played in the 1920s and 1930s. He played for Eastern Suburbs as a fullback and also as a winger.

== Playing career ==
Hong made his first grade debut for Eastern Suburbs against Balmain at the Royal Agricultural Society Ground in Round 7 1929.

In 1931, Hong enjoyed his best season as a player as he was selected to play for New South Wales and New South Wales City teams. Also in 1931, Hong won the minor premiership with Easts as the club finished first on the table. Eastern Suburbs went on to reach the 1931 grand final against arch rivals South Sydney.

In the match, Hong injured his ankle and was stretchered off the field. As there was no interchange at the time, Easts played with a man down for the rest of the match. Souths went on to win the match 12–7 with Souths halfback Harry Eyres crossed for the winning try after the referee had accidentally got in between Eyres and the tackler.

Hong went on to play with Easts in 1932 and his final game in first grade was a 26–8 loss against Souths in the 1932 semi final.
