= Vic Webber =

Australian rugby league footballer

Personal information
- Full name: Victor Eric Webber
- Born: 16 May 1906; Maclean, New South Wales
- Died: 28 Feb 2005; Port Stephens, New South Wales

Playing information
- Position: Fullback, Wing, Centre
Club
| Years | Team | Pld | T | G | FG | P |
|---|---|---|---|---|---|---|
| 1926 | Glebe | 1 | 0 | 0 | 0 | 0 |
| 1927–29 | Eastern Suburbs | 10 | 3 | 0 | 0 | 9 |
| | Total | 11 | 3 | 0 | 0 | 9 |
- Source: As of 21 June 2019

Victor Eric Webber (1906-2005) was an Australian professional rugby league footballer who played in the New South Wales Rugby League (NSWRL) competition.

== Playing career ==
Webber, a Winger, played for the Eastern Suburbs in the years 1927 and 1928. In the 1928 season Webber played in the Eastern Suburbs side that was defeated by South Sydney in that year's premiership decider. Webber was a participant in rugby league first night match, a 10 aside exhibition game that took place in December 1928.

Webber also played one game for foundation club Glebe in 1926 which was against Eastern Suburbs at Wentworth Park.
