= Les Rogers (rugby league) =

Australian rugby league footballer

Personal information
- Full name: Lesley Rogers
- Born: 19 November 1909; Sydney, New South Wales, Australia
- Died: 19 March 1939 (aged 29)

Playing information
- Position: Prop, Lock, Second-row
Club
Years	Team	Pld	T	G	FG	P
1930–33	Eastern Suburbs	48	23	2	0	73
Representative
Years	Team	Pld	T	G	FG	P
1930	Metropolis	1	1	0	0	3
- Source: As of 14 March 2019

Les Rogers was an Australian rugby league footballer who played in the 1930s. He played for Eastern Suburbs in the NSWRL competition.

== Playing career ==
Rogers made his first grade debut for Eastern Suburbs against Balmain at the Wentworth Park in Round 1 1930 scoring a try in a 26–12 victory. Rogers was selected to play for Metropolis in 1930, the earlier version of the NSW City team.

In 1931, Eastern Suburbs finished as minor premiers and Rogers made 15 appearances scoring 12 tries. Easts would then go on to reach the 1931 grand final against South Sydney.

Eastern Suburbs went into the match as favorites but an injury to Easts winger Billy Hong meant that the side played with a man down for most of the game. Souths went on to win the match 12–7 with Souths halfback Harry Eyres crossed for the winning try after the referee had accidentally got in between Eyres and the tackler.

In 1933, Rogers played 8 games and scored 2 tries for Easts. His last match in first grade was in Round 14 1933 against University which ended in 29–8 victory.
