= Harry Eyers =

Australian rugby league footballer

Personal information
- Full name: Henry Thomas Eyers
- Born: 13 August 1908 Redfern, New South Wales, Australia
- Died: 28 December 1976 (aged 68) Sydney, New South Wales, Australia

Playing information
- Position: Halfback, Centre
Club
Years	Team	Pld	T	G	FG	P
1929–36	South Sydney	57	18	0	0	54

Henry Thomas Eyers (1908–1976) was an Australian rugby league footballer who played in the 1920s and 1930s.

== Playing career ==
Eyers was born at Redfern, New South Wales on 13 August 1908.

== Playing career ==
He played in the Souths junior league until he was graded in 1927. He went on to play eight seasons of first grade for the South Sydney club between 1929 and 1936.

Eyers won a premiership with Souths when he played half-back in the 1931 Grand Final against arch rivals Eastern Suburbs. Eyers scored the winning try for Souths in the 1931 final during the last minute of play. Eyers played in the centres during the 1935 Grand Final which was also against Eastern Suburbs.

== Death ==
Eyers died on 28 December 1976 aged 68.
