= Hugh Byrne (rugby league) =

Australian rugby league footballer

Personal information
- Full name: Hubert Patrick Byrne
- Born: 28 April 1904 Woollahra, New South Wales, Australia
- Died: 22 December 1983 (aged 79) Sydney, New South Wales, Australia

Playing information
- Position: Centre, Wing
Club
Years	Team	Pld	T	G	FG	P
1925–30	Eastern Suburbs	56	27	2	0	85
1932–33	South Sydney	8	5	0	0	15
	Total	64	32	2	0	100

Hugh "Jazzer" Byrne (1904–1983) was an Australian rugby league footballer who played in the 1920s and 1930s.

Born on 28 April 1904 at Woollahra, New South Wales, Byrne became a large, striding winger. Byrne played for Eastern Suburbs (1925–1928 and 1930) and South Sydney (1932–33).

In 1928 Byrne was selected to represent Australia in a test match against England.

Byrne died on 22 December 1983, aged 79.
