= Nelson Hardy =

Australian rugby league footballer

Personal information
- Full name: Nelson Hardy
- Born: 8 September 1905 Rockdale, New South Wales, Australia
- Died: 31 March 1993 (aged 87) Monterey, New South Wales, Australia

Playing information
- Position: Centre
Club
Years	Team	Pld	T	G	FG	P
1925–30	Eastern Suburbs	87	13	28	0	95
1931–33	Warrington RLFC	38	5	0	0	15
1936	St. George	2	0	0	0	0
	Total	127	18	28	0	110
Representative
Years	Team	Pld	T	G	FG	P
1926–30	New South Wales	15	2	8	0	22
1928	Australia	3	0	0	0	0
1925–30	Metropolis	3	2	6	0	18
1928–30	NSW City	2	3	0	0	9
- Relatives: Steve Hardy (grandson)

Nelson 'Bill' Hardy (8 September 1905 – 31 March 1993) was an Australian rugby league footballer who played in the 1920s and 1930s.

Hardy was playing first grade in the NSWRFL premiership for his side, the Eastern Suburbs club, at just 18 years of age. An accomplished centre or fullback Hardy played 87 matches for Easts in the years 1925–30.

In 1928, Hardy was a member of the Eastern Suburbs side that was defeated by South Sydney in that year's premiership decider. On 22 December 1928 Hardy took place in rugby league first night match, an exhibition match between that year's finalists Easts and Souths.

Hardy played in three tests for the Australia national rugby league team in the 1928 season against a touring Great Britain side and was a representative of New South Wales on 15 occasions throughout his career.

Hardy played out his career in England with the Warrington Wolves club. However, when he returned to Australia, he played as captain coach of Cessnock, New South Wales in 1935. He then came back to Sydney and moved to the St. George District and had one season at the St. George Dragons in 1936, but injuries ended his final season early.

Hardy's sons Leslie and Don played first grade for Eastern Suburbs while his grandson, Steve, was an Australian schoolboy rugby league representative who played for both the Cronulla-Sutherland and Eastern Suburbs clubs.

A glazier by trade Hardy was aged 87 at the time of his death in 1993.

== Sources ==
- Whiticker, Alan & Hudson, Glen (2006) The Encyclopedia of Rugby League Players, Gavin Allen Publishing, Sydney
- (David Middleton), Rugby League Yearbook
