= Norm Pope (rugby league, born 1908) =

Australian RL coach and former rugby league footballer

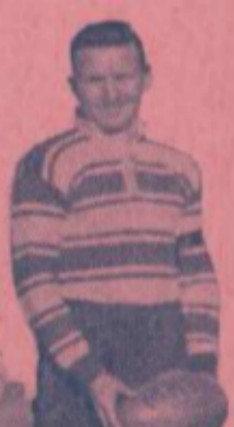
- Norm Pope St.George Captain-Coach 1938

Personal information
- Full name: Norman Daniel Pope
- Born: 13 February 1908 Melbourne, Victoria, Australia
- Died: 7 April 1985 (aged 77) Bexley, New South Wales, Australia

Playing information
Club
Years	Team	Pld	T	G	FG	P
1927–31	Eastern Suburbs	57	16	1	0	50
1937–38	St George	20	2	0	1	8
	Total	77	18	1	1	58
Representative
Years	Team	Pld	T	G	FG	P
1931	New South Wales	1	0	0	0	0
1931	NSW City	1	0	0	0	0
1933	NSW Country	1	1	0	0	3

Coaching information
Club
Years	Team	Gms	W	D	L	W%
1938	St George	14	3	1	10	21

Norman Daniel Pope (February 13 1908 – April 7 1985) was a professional rugby league footballer in the Australian competition, the New South Wales Rugby League.

== Career ==
Pope played in the halves at the Eastern Suburbs club for five seasons in the years 1927–31.In the 1931 season Pope captained the side that lost to South Sydney in the 1931 Grand Final.

It’s believed the halfback went missing before the start of a Club trial match to go to the races. This would give Joe (Chimpy) Busch his start. The latter would not disappoint.

From 1932, he moved to the Maitland United club as captain-coach. Then he took on the captain-coach role at Tumbarumba for three seasons (1933–1936) before returning to Sydney.

He then joined the St George Dragons club, again taking on a captain-coach role (1937–1938).

In 1931 Pope represented New South Wales in an interstate match against Queensland, and later played in N.S.W. Country Firsts in 1933.

Pope died on 7 April 1985, aged 77.
