= 1920 Auckland Rugby League season =

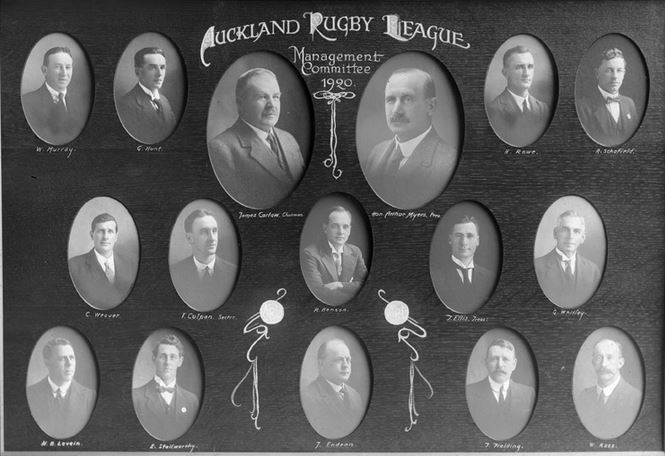
Auckland RL management committee.

The Auckland Rugby League was in its 12th season.

On 25 March, North Shore Albions held a meeting to discuss whether they should amalgamate with Sunnyside League Football Club, who were also based in Devonport and had been in existence since 1914. The following week both clubs agreed to merge. After some debate they decided their club name would be 'Devonport United' and they would wear green and white broad bands. In addition Grafton and Richmond Rovers amalgamated, while new clubs were also formed in Kingsland (Kingsland Rovers), and at Point Chevalier.

First grade games continued to regularly draw large crowds, especially matches involving the likes of Maritime, City Rovers, and Ponsonby United. The round 6 match between Maritime and Ponsonby drew what was thought to be a record crowd for a club match in Auckland of 9,000. Maritime would go on to win the first grade title for the first time after a strong season where they won nine games and were only defeated twice. They were awarded the Monteith Shield at the 1921 annual general meeting while Newton Rangers won the Roope Rooster for the second year in a row by defeating Maritime in the final.

The highlight of the year was the match between Auckland and the touring England team on 24 July. A crowd of 30,000 packed into the Auckland Domain to witness an Auckland win by 24 points to 16.

Preceded by 1919	12th Auckland Rugby League season 1920	Succeeded by 1921

== Club news ==
=== Club teams by grade participation ===
The Grafton and Richmond clubs fielded combined teams in the 4th, 5th (2), and 6th grades hence the 'half numbers'.

Team	1st Grade	2nd Grade	3rd Grade	4th Grade	5th Grade	6th Grade	Total
Devonport United	1	2	1	1	1	1	7
Ponsonby United	1	1	0	1	1	1	5
City Rovers	1	1	0	1	1	1	5
Maritime	1	1	0	1	1	1	5
Grafton Athletic	1	0	0	.5	1	.5	3 (5)
Richmond Rovers	0	0	0	.5	1	.5	2 (4)
Newton Rangers	1	1	1	0	0	0	3
Manukau Rovers	0	0	1	0	1	1	3
Northcote & Birkenhead Ramblers	0	0	0	1	1	0	2
Marist Old Boys	1	1	0	0	0	0	2
Kingsland Rovers	0	0	1	1	0	0	2
Otahuhu Rovers	0	0	0	1	1	0	2
Māngere Rangers	0	1	0	0	0	0	1
Thames Old Boys	0	1	0	0	0	0	1
Point Chevalier	0	0	1	0	0	0	1
Total	7	9	5	8	9	6	44

=== Carlaw Park site found ===
At the end of the season an inspection was made of the site where Carlaw Park would emerge. It was decided that the ground would be named ‘Carlaw Athletic Park’. The land had been purchased years earlier. It was noted that the site was “excellently situated for the purpose for which it is intended, and provides sufficient space for two playing grounds. Natural slopes on two sides will give room for a large number of spectators...”.

== Monteith Shield (first grade championship) ==
Maritime won the first grade title with City Rovers finishing in second position. Three grounds were used for the competition, Victoria Park, the Auckland Domain, and the Devonport Domain. Thirty eight matches were played which was the most in the competitions history to this point. Unlike in previous seasons all clubs were able to survive until the end of the season and fulfill the majority, or all, of their fixture obligations.

=== Statistics ===
Including the knockout games there were 43 first grade games played with 249 tries, 114 conversions, 43 penalties, 4 drop goals, and 3 goals from a mark. The average number of points per game was 25, an increase of 3 points from the previous season. There were 5.8 tries per game, compared to 5.35 the previous season. With 114 conversions from 249 attempts the successful percentage was only 45.8.

=== Monteith Shield standings ===
Team	Pld	W	D	L	F	A	Pts
Maritime	11	9	0	2	168	93	18
City Rovers	12	8	0	4	270	131	16
Marist Old Boys	11	7*	1	3	102	79	15
Newton Rangers	11	6	1	4	133	132	13
Devonport United	12	4*	2	6	98	151	10
Ponsonby United	11	2	2	7	125	160	6
Grafton Athletic	11	1	0	10**	78	228	2

(*) Two of Grafton's defeats were by default, while one of Marist's wins and one of Devonport's wins were by default.

=== Monteith Shield fixtures ===
==== Round 1 ====
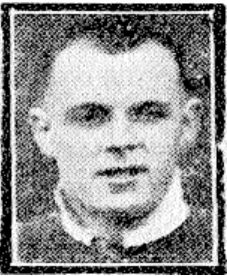
Wally Somers

Wally Somers scored for Newton in their win over Grafton. The Marist club took the field in their familiar green colour after having played their first senior season in 1919 season wearing blue jerseys.

1 May	Ponsonby	21–14	Marist	Auckland Domain
3:00	Try: Bill Walsh, Sam Lowrie, Laurie Cadman, W Henderson, Eric McGregor; Con: A Cross; Pen: A Cross 2		Try: C Clarke, Sheehan, Arthur Eustace, James (Sonny) Hing; Pen: Billy Ghent	Referee: J Eddowes

1 May	Newton	30–15	Grafton	Victoria Park
3:00	Try: E Adams, Wally Somers 3, Arthur James 2 Con: Craddock Dufty 6		Try: Anderson, Karl Ifwersen, C Owen; Con: Karl Ifwersen 3	Referee: William Mincham

1 May	Devonport	10–32	City	Devonport Domain
3:00	Try: Penalty Try, George Seagar; Con: G Stewart; Pen: G Stewart		Try: Bill Davidson 3, Maurice Wetherill, George Paki 2, Robert Clark, Harry Wynn, Ivan Stewart, Unknown x 1 Con: George Reid	Referee: Len Farrant

==== Round 2 ====
The draw by Marist saw them accrue their first ever first grade championship point after going through the 1919 season win-less in the same competition. Future New Zealand prop Jim O'Brien played at fullback in his first grade debut for Maritime. He moved into the forwards in the following weeks and the following season transferred to Devonport United where he was from.

8 May	City	18–16	Ponsonby	Auckland Domain 1
3:00	Try: Ivan Stewart, Bill Davidson, J Mitchell, George Paki; Con: Bill Davidson 2 Pen: Bill Davidson		Try: Bill Walsh 2, Eric McGregor, Dougie McGregor; Con: Thomas McClymont; Pen: Thomas McClymont	Attendance: 5,500; Referee: Archie Ferguson

8 May	Maritime	25–0	Grafton	Auckland Domain 2
3:00	Try: John McGregor, Ernie Herring 2, Arthur Sutton, Bill Arndt, Bert Avery, Jim O'Brien; Con: Arthur Sutton, Tierney			Attendance: 5,500; Referee: Frank Thompson

8 May	Newton	5–5	Marist	Victoria Park 2
3:00	Try: Bill Cloke; Con: Craddock Dufty		Try: Norm Loveridge; Pen: Neville St George	Referee: A Ripley

==== Round 3 ====
A Godick of Devonport in attempting to stop a try struck his head on the goal post and was knocked unconscious and taken from the field.

15 May	City	16–3	Newton	Auckland Domain 1
3:00	Try: George Reid 2, Bob Clarke, Bert Laing; Con: Bill Davidson, Maurice Wetherill		Try: Nelson Bass	Attendance: 3,500; Referee: J Ball

15 May	Maritime	16–11	Marist	Victoria Park 1
3:00	Try: Arthur Sutton 2, Eric Grey 2 Con: Arthur Sutton; Pen: Arthur Sutton		Try: Roly Tate, Sid McNamara, Unknown x 1 Con: Bill Stormont	Attendance: 2,500; Referee: Billy Murray

15 May	Devonport	17–17	Ponsonby	Devonport Domain
3:00	Try: Keith Helander, Cyril Nicholson 2 Con: Arthur Matthews 3 Pen: Arthur Matthews		Try: Arthur Pooley, A Halliday, Dougie McGregor, Frank Delgrosso, Laurie Cadman; Con: A Cross	Referee: Clow

==== Round 4 ====
Marist recorded their first ever victory in the first grade championship with Bill Stormont scoring one of their three tries.

22 May	Maritime	8–6	City	Auckland Domain
3:00	Try: Bert Avery, Eric Grey; Con: John Lang		Pen: Bill Davidson 3	Attendance: 5,500; Referee: A Ball

22 May	Marist	15–3	Grafton	Victoria Park
3:00	Try: Bill Stormont, Billy Ghent, Unknown x 1 Con: Billy Ghent, Arthur Eustace, Unknown x 1		Try: Horace Neal	Referee: Clayton

22 May	Newton	15–5	Devonport	Devonport Domain
3:00	Try: Jack Keenan, Ronald Lovett, Albert Ivil; Con: Craddock Dufty 2 Pen: Craddock Dufty		Try: Cyril Nicholson; Pen: G Stewart	Referee: Eddowes

==== Round 5 ====
The match between City and Grafton had the score reported by both the Auckland Star and the New Zealand Herald but had no match report and scoring. The Observer had a brief description of the match where they described one of Karl Ifwersen's "tries" indicating he scored at least 2.

29 May	Newton	12–11	Ponsonby	Auckland Domain 1
3:00	Try: Nelson Bass, Wally Somers; Con: Craddock Dufty; Pen: Craddock Dufty 2		Try: Eric McGregor 2, Thomas McClymont; Pen: A Cross	Attendance: 5000; Referee: A Ferguson

29 May	City	24–17	Grafton	Auckland Domain 2
3:00	Try: Unknown 24 pts		Try: Karl Ifwersen 2, Unknown 11 pts	Attendance: 5,000

29 May	Maritime	17–3	Devonport	Victoria Park
3:00	Try: Bert Avery, John McGregor 4 Con: Arthur Sutton		Try: George Seagar	Referee: Len Farrant

==== Round 6 ====
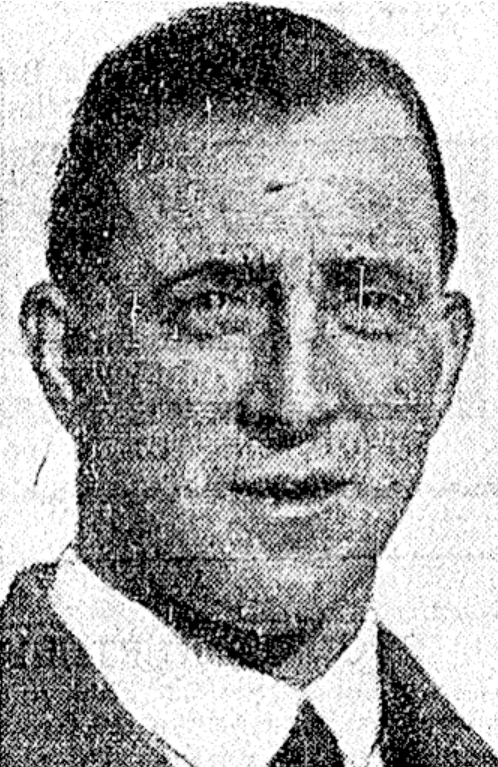
Karl Ifwersen

Arthur Cadman was sent off in the Maritime match versus Ponsonby for kicking a Maritime player, while the Auckland Star suggested in their match reports that the 9,000 in attendance was possibly the largest ever Auckland Club Rugby League crowd to attend a match to this point. Two weeks later the Auckland Star reported that a player sent off in the match was suspended for two weeks for using bad language towards an official. In the City v Marist match two City players and one Marist player were ordered off in the first half. Grafton defaulted their match against Devonport as Joe Bennett was injured, Karl Ifwersen was sick, Horace Neal had a "broken shoulder", and Owen, Moir, and Norton were out of town.

12 June	Maritime	11–8	Ponsonby	Auckland Domain 1
3:00	Try: Harry Grey, John McGregor, Bert McGregor; Con: Eric Grey		Try: Thomas McClymont, Eric McGregor; Con: A Cross	Attendance: 9,000; Referee: J Eddowes

12 June	Marist	19–5	City	Auckland Domain 2
3:00	Try: Billy Ghent 2, Arthur Eustace, Sid McNamara, Bill Stormont; Con: Unknown x 2		Try: Bill Davidson; Con: Bill Davidson	Attendance: 9,000; Referee: Vause

12 June	Devonport	WBD-LBD	Grafton	Devonport Domain 1
3:00				Referee: Jim Rukutai

==== Round 7 ====
2 Players were ordered off in the 2nd half of the Maritime versus Newton match. While in the Grafton v Ponsonby match Grafton had two players ordered off including Horace Neal, and had another injured meaning they finished the match with just 10 players on the field. Both ordered off players were suspended for two weeks.

26 June	Maritime	14–7	Newton	Victoria Park 1
3:00	Try: Eric Grey 3, John Lang; Pen: Arthur Sutton (1 mark)		Try: Wally Somers; Pen: Craddock Dufty 2	Attendance: 7,000; Referee: Billy Murray

26 June	Ponsonby	26–0	Grafton	Auckland Domain 1
3:00	Try: William Southernwood 2, Dougie McGregor, Sam Lowrie, Eric McGregor, W Henderson; Con: Eric McGregor, A Cross 3			Referee: Frank Thompson

26 June	Devonport	8–3	Marist	Devonport Domain
3:00	Try: Alex Godick, Cyril Nicholson; Con: Arthur Matthews		Try: Arthur Eustace	Referee: Clayton

==== Round 8 ====
3 July	Marist	8–4	Ponsonby	Auckland Domain 2
3:00	Try: Bill Stormont, Unknown x 1 Con: White		Pen: A Cross 2	Attendance: 5,000; Referee: Walter Ripley

3 July	Newton	24–15	Grafton	Auckland Domain 3
3:00	Try: Thomas Virtue, Charles James, S Delaney 2, Unknown x 2 Con: Clarrie Polson, Unknown x 2		Try: Charles Woolley, Yates, McGinley; Con: Charles Woolley 3	Attendance: 5,000; Referee: J Clow

3 July	City	19–5	Devonport	Victoria Park
3:00	Try: Bill Davidson 2, Maurice Wetherill, George Paki, Miller; Con: Bill Davidson, Maurice Wetherill		Try: Alex Godick; Con: George Seagar	Attendance: 3,500; Referee: Archie Ferguson

==== Round 9 ====
Massa Johnston (William Johnston) played for Grafton in their 10-5 win over Maritime. The following week the Maritime club protested his playing for them. Johnston had returned from the war and returned to Dundedin, however as there was no rugby league played in the area at the time he moved to Auckland and joined the Grafton club. The Auckland Rugby League held over their decision and after further discussion decided that the match result should stand. Johnston was 39 years old and had played rugby union for Otago, the South Island and New Zealand before switching to rugby league and playing for Wigan and Warrington in England from 1908 to 1912. At some point after he transferred to Coventry but that club went out of existence so he was not tied to any particular club. Remarkably he was playing for the first time in nearly 8 years.

10 July	City	37–5	Ponsonby	Auckland Domain 1
3:00	Try: Ben Davidson, Harry Francis, J Mitchell, George Paki + Unknown 19 pts Con: Bill Davidson 3		Try: Laurie Cadman; Con: A Cross	Referee: A Ball

10 July	Marist	9–5	Newton	Auckland Domain 2
3:00	Try: Bill Stormont; Con: Bill Stormont; Pen: Billy Ghent, Bill Stormont		Try: Dempsey; Con: E Adams	Referee: Jim Rukutai

10 July	Grafton	10–5	Maritime	Auckland Domain 3
3:00	Try: F Collins, A McSweeney; Con: Joe Bennett; Pen: Charles Woolley		Try: Harry Grey; Con: George Yardley	Referee: William Mincham

==== Round 10 ====
17 July	Marist	8–7	Maritime	Auckland Domain 1
3:00	Try: Norm Loveridge, George Cargill; Pen: Billy Ghent		Try: George Yardley; Pen: John Lang, Eric Grey	Attendance: 7,000; Referee: Billy Murray

17 July	City	31–10	Newton	Auckland Domain 2
3:00	Try: Bert Laing, Ben Davidson, George Paki, Maurice Wetherill, Bill Davidson, Bob Clarke 2 Con: Maurice Wetherill, Bill Davidson 3 Pen: Bert Laing		Try: Leonard Newdick, Thomas Biggs; Con: Craddock Dufty 2	Attendance: 7,000; Referee: Frank Thompson

17 July	Ponsonby	7–7	Devonport	Auckland Domain 3
3:00	Try: Bill Walsh; Con: Thomas McClymont; Pen: Thomas McClymont		Try: Alex Godick; Pen: Arthur Matthews 2	Attendance: 7,000; Referee: Len Farrant

==== Round 11 ====
The City v Grafton match resulted in a 66–13 win to City but the Auckland Star and New Zealand Herald did not report any of the scoring details. Grafton were missing Karl Ifwersen, Joe Bennett, and Charles Woolley who were on representative duty and could only field 11 players.

7 August	City	66–13	Grafton	Victoria Park 1
3:00	Try: Unknown x 16; Con: Unknown x 9		Try: Unknown x 3 Con: Unknown x 2	Referee: T Hill

7 August	Newton	10–0	Ponsonby	Victoria Park 2
3:00	Try: Bill Cloke, Ballyntyne; Con: Craddock Dufty; Pen: Craddock Dufty			Referee: J Clow

7 August	Maritime	24–19	Devonport	Victoria Park 3
3:00	Try: J Brien 2, Bert McGregor, John Lang, Harry Grey, Unknown x 1 Con: Arthur Sutton, John Lang; Pen: Vivian Hogg (1 mark)		Try: Cyril Nicholson 2, Unknown x 1 Con: G Stewart 2, Unknown x 1 Pen: G Stewart, Unknown x 1	Referee: Walter Ripley

==== Round 12 ====
14 August	Maritime	15–11	City	Auckland Domain 1
3:00	Try: John McGregor 2, Jim O'Brien; Con: John Lang 2 Pen: John Lang (1 mark)		Try: George Paki 2, W Green; Con: Bill Davidson	Attendance: 7000; Referee: Archie Ferguson

14 August	Newton	12–11	Devonport	Auckland Domain 2
3:00	Try: Craddock Dufty, Thomas Virtue; Con: Craddock Dufty; Pen: Craddock Dufty, W Knox		Try: Cyril Nicholson 2, B Voss; Con: G Stewart	Attendance: 7,000; Referee: Frank Thompson

14 August	Marist	WBD-LBD	Grafton	Auckland Domain 3
3:00				Referee: William Mincham

==== Round 13 ====
21 August	Marist	10–5	City	Auckland Domain 1
3:00	Try: Arthur Eustace, Sid Fry; Con: Billy Ghent 2		Try: George Paki; Con: Maurice Wetherill	Attendance: 6,500; Referee: Walter Ripley

21 August	Maritime	26–10	Ponsonby	Auckland Domain 2
3:00	Try: Harry Grey, Eric Grey 3, Bert Avery, Ernie Herring, Vivian Hogg; Con: Eric Grey		Try: George Mormon 2 Con: A Cross; Pen: A Cross	Attendance: 6,500; Referee: Len Farrant

21 August	Devonport	13–5	Grafton	Auckland Domain 3
3:00	Try: Webb, H Mann, Rundle, C Nelson; Con: G Stewart		Try: E Elliot; Con: Brady	Attendance: 6,500; Referee: H Clayton

== Roope Rooster knockout competition ==
The Roope Rooster began on 28 August with 3 first round matches and Ponsonby United receiving a bye. Newton Rangers defeated Maritime in the final for the second consecutive year.

=== Round 1 ===
City had six of their senior players away and had to field juniors in their place though still beat Grafton 14-3. Grafton played a lot better than they did in their previous meeting when they conceded over 60 points. In this game City only led 3-0 at halftime. At a very muddy Devonport Domain the visiting Newton side knocked out the local team thanks to two converted tries to Ronald Lovett. A player was ordered off in the Maritime v Marist game and suspended for a week though they were not named in the newspapers.

28 August	City	14–3	Grafton	Victoria Park 2
3:00	Try: J Mitchell, W Horne; Con: Bill Davidson; Pen: Bill Davidson 2 Drop: Bob Clarke		Try: Yates	Attendance: 6,000; Referee: Frank Thompson

28 August	Maritime	9–6	Marist	Victoria Park 3
3:00	Try: Arthur Sutton; Con: Eric Grey; Drop: Arthur Sutton, Eric Grey		Try: Bill Stormont, Arthur Eustace	Attendance: 6,000; Referee: Archie Ferguson

28 August	Devonport	7–10	Newton	Devonport Domain 1
3:00	Try: H Mann; Con: G Stewart; Pen: G Stewart		Try: Ronald Lovett 2 Con: Craddock Dufty 2	Referee: A Vause

=== Semi finals ===
Bill Davidson dislocated his collarbone in City's 19-5 loss to Newton. Ponsonby was unable to field the same team that beat Federal the previous Saturday to retained the Thacker Shield and instead fielded a number of junior.

11 September	Newton	19–5	City	Devonport Domain 1
3:00	Try: Bill Cloke, Ronald Lovett, S.B. Delaney, Clarrie Polson, Unknown x 1 Con: Wally Somers; Pen: Craddock Dufty		Try: Maurice Wetherill; Con: Bill Davidson	Referee: Billy Murray

11 September	Maritime	11–5	Ponsonby	Devonport Domain 2
3:00	Try: Harry Grey, Eric Grey, John McGregor; Con: John McGregor		Try: Tickner; Con: Eric McGregor	Referee: A Ball

=== Final ===
An enormous crowd of 10,000 packed into Victoria Park to witness Newton winning the Roope Rooster trophy for the second consecutive year.

18 September	Newton	12–6	Maritime	Victoria Park 1
3:00	Try: Bill Cloke, S Delaney; Con: Craddock Dufty; Pen: Craddock Dufty 2		Try: Ernie Herring, Bert Avery	Attendance: 10,000; Referee: Archie Ferguson

== Top try scorers and point scorers ==
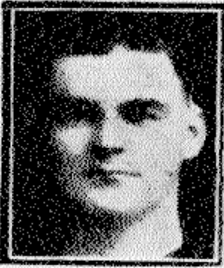
Bill Davidson

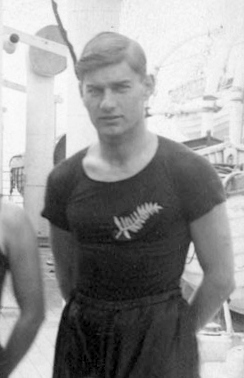
George Davidson

The following point scoring lists include Senior Championship matches and the Roope Rooster competition matches only. The lists are extremely incomplete for players from the City Rovers club who had no scoring whatsoever for their 24–17 win over Grafton Athletic, and their 66–13 win over the same opponents. In total the City team was missing the scorers of 118 of its points. Likewise Devonport United was missing scorers for 7 points, Newton Rangers for 13, Maritime for 3, Marist Old Boys for 15, and Grafton Athletic for 30 (from the two matches with City).

Bill Davidson replicated the feat of his younger brother George of the previous season by leading the point scoring while playing for Maritime. George had qualified for the Antwerp Olympics where he ran 5th in the 200m final and did not play in the Auckland Rugby League competition at all in 1920. He was to return and join his brothers in the City Rovers team from the 1921 season onwards.

The games played is approximate only as not all teams published their team lists in the Friday newspapers and changes were often made on match day. Players from teams that did not publish team lists each week have been asterisked and likely played more games.

Rank	Player	Team	Gm	Tries
1	Eric Grey	Maritime	12	10
2	George Paki	City	11*	9
3=	John McGregor	Maritime	12	8
3=	Cyril Nicholson	Devonport	11*	8
3=	Bill Davidson	City	14	8
6	Eric McGregor	Ponsonby	11	6
7=	Arthur Eustace	Marist	8*	5
7=	Harry Grey	Maritime	10	5
7=	Wally Somers	Newton	10*	5
7=	Bert Avery	Maritime	11	5
7=	Bill Stormont	Marist	8*	5

Rk	Player	Team	Gm	T	C	P	M	DG	Pts
1	Bill Davidson	City	14	8	14	6	0	0	64
2	Craddock Dufty	Newton	12*	1	16	8	0	0	51
3	Eric Grey	Maritime	12	10	3	1	0	1	40
4	A Cross	Ponsonby	12	0	9	6	0	0	30
5	George Paki	City	11*	9	0	0	0	0	27
6=	John McGregor	Maritime	12	8	1	0	0	0	26
6=	Arthur Sutton	Maritime	13	4	4	1	1	1	26
8	Cyril Nicholson	Devonport	11*	8	0	0	0	0	24
9	Eric McGregor	Ponsonby	11	6	2	0	0	0	22
10=	Bill Stormont	Marist	8*	5	2	1	0	0	21
10=	Billy Ghent	Marist	8*	3	3	3	0	0	21

== Thacker Shield ==
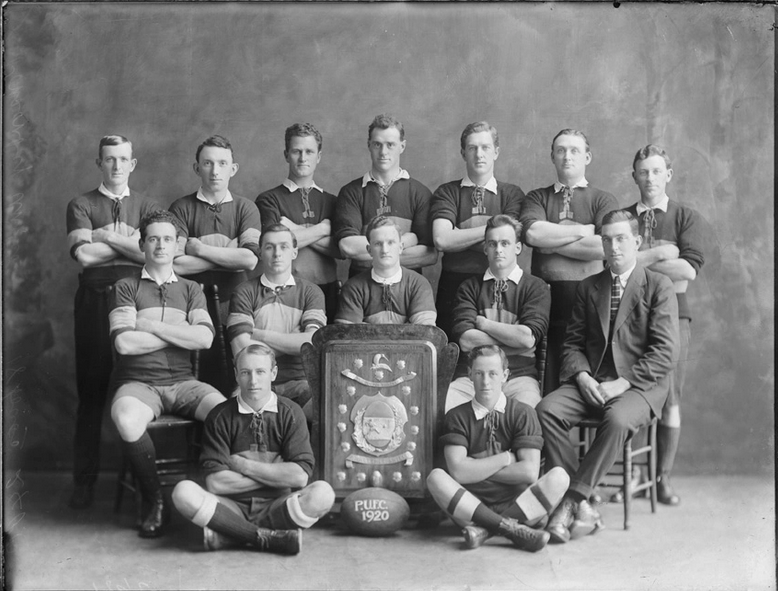
Ponsonby in 1920 with the Thacker Shield.

Ponsonby United defended the Thacker Shield from Federal (of Christchurch) at Victoria Park in front of 10,000 spectators. They had won the shield from Sydenham in Christchurch two years earlier. They had been unable to arrange a defence in the 1919 season. Eventually the shield was to be returned to Christchurch and played for amongst teams in the South Island.

4 September	Ponsonby	29–19	Federal (Christchurch)	Victoria Park
3:00	Try: Arthur Pooley, A Cross, Dougie McGregor 2, George Mormon, Jim Clark, Thomas McClymont; Con: A Cross 4		Try: L Thackwell, F Kidd, E Cunningham; Con: Billy Mitchell 2 Pen: Billy Mitchell 3	Attendance: 10,000; Referee: Archie Ferguson

== Other club matches and lower grades ==
=== Exhibition and benefit matches ===
3 July	Lower Waikato	20-31	Maritime	Victoria Park 1
3:00	Try: Unknown 20 points		Try: John McGregor 2, Eric Grey 3, John Lang 2, Bert Avery 2 Con: Arthur Sutton	Attendance: 2,000

10 July	King Country	0-15	Devonport	Taumarunui
3:00			Try: Stan Walters 2, Alex Godick, Cyril Nicholson, E Chivers

18 September	Marist	21–14	Hamilton	Victoria Park 1
1:30	Try: Arthur Eustace 2, Percy Gallagher, George Cargill, Bill Stormont; Con: Bill Stormont 2, James (Sonny) Hing		Try: Shirtcliff, Payne, Vernall, Clarkin; Con: Manning	Attendance: 10,000; Referee: A Ball

14 August	Hamilton	30-28	Ponsonby	Seddon Park, Hamilton
3:00	Try: Dufty, Clarkin, Halliday, Hamilton, Brady, Brain, Prickett, Fitzgerald; Con: Dufty 2, Cave		Try: Bolton, Black, A Halliday, W Henderson, Sam Lowrie, Arthur Pooley, Unknown x 2 Con: A Cross, A Halliday	Referee: Jim Rukutai

==== Devonport XIII v King Country (Taumarunui) ====
On September 25 a King Country side traveled to Auckland to take on a Devonport XIII at the Devonport Domain. King Country had played against Cambridge mid week. The match was played in atrocious conditions with half the Devonport Domain field under muddy water. Ben Davidson from the City club played for Devonport thus it was not an official full Devonport side. Davidson scored a try in their 13-8 defeat.

25 September	Devonport XIII	8-13	King Country (Taumarunui)	Devonport Domain 2
3:00	Try: Cyril Nicholson, Ben Davidson; Con: Alex Godick		Try: Kahu, Logan, London; Con: Kahu, Doran	Referee: H Clayton

==== Hamilton Hospital Benefit Match ====
On September 25 the Maritime and Marist clubs sent teams to play an exhibition match at Seddon Park in Hamilton to raise money for Hamilton Hospital. The match was played in poor weather conditions. Craddock Dufty from the Newton side played for Maritime and scored their first try.

25 September	Maritime XIII	18-3	Marist XIII	Seddon Park, Hamilton
3:00	Try: Craddock Dufty, George Yardley, Bill Arndt, Ernie Herring; Con: John Lang 3		Try: Unknown

List of Matches
	Date		Score		Score	Venue	Attendance
Exhibition match	29 May	King Country	6	Marist Old Boys	12	Taumarunui	

=== Lower grade teams and clubs ===
There were 5 lower grades in 1920. Richmond and Grafton fielded a combined side in the 5th grade, though Richmond also fielded their own side in the same grade.

Point Chevalier fielded their first ever side in the Third Grade competition. They lost their first ever match to Devonport United (North Shore Albions) by 22 points to 6. Their only other reported results were a 21-7 loss to the same opponent in round 7 and a 14-2 loss in round 8 to Manukau.

==== Second Grade ====
The full results were not reported with just 18 reported and 38 not reported therefor the standings are very incomplete. City Rovers won the competition. Devonport United B withdrew after 7 rounds, Thames Old Boys withdrew after 10 rounds Marist and Māngere Rangers both withdrew after 11 rounds.

Team	Pld	W	D	L	B	F	A	Pts
City Rovers	6	3	1	2	1	63	32	7
Ponsonby United	5	4	0	1	0	61	40	8
Maritime	5	3	1	1	1	78	49	7
Northcote & Birkenhead Ramblers	5	3	0	2	1	55	31	6
Devonport United A	4	2	0	2	1	24	43	4
Marist Old Boys	3	1	0	2	0	15	16	2
Newton Rangers	3	0	2	1	0	17	19	2
Devonport B	3	1	0	2	2	19	27	2
Māngere Rangers	3	1	0	2	1	9	46	2
Thames Old Boys	8	0	0	2	2	15	53	0

==== Third Grade ====
Manukau won their first ever grade title. The full results were not reported with only 8 scores published in the newspapers and 16 not published. Maritime withdrew after 4 rounds, and Newton Rangers withdrew after 5 rounds. Ellerslie United played a friendly match with Kingsland on September 25 when the season had finished.

Team	Pld	W	D	L	B	F	A	Pts
Manukau	5	5	0	0	1	64	26	10
Devonport United	5	3	0	2	0	75	45	6
Kingsland Rovers	2	0	0	2	1	7	27	0
Point Chevalier	3	0	0	3	1	15	57	0
Newton Rangers	1	0	0	1	1	5	11	0
Maritime	0	0	0	0	1	0	0	0

==== Fourth Grade ====
Ponsonby United won the competition. There were 19 results reported and 20 not reported. The round 1 match between Kingsland and City was abandoned with the referee refusing to play the match due to the extremely poor standard of the field at the newly developed. Thirty shillings had been spent on clearing the ground prior. Maritime withdrew after just one round while Marist withdrew a week later. Northcote & Birkenhead withdrew following round 8, as did Devonport United. On August 28 Ellerslie (who were reforming) played a match against Grafton-Richmond, which they lost 10-6. On the same day City beat Ponsonby 43-0 in a knockout match. Knockout matches were played over the following 3 weeks but no results were reported.

Team	Pld	W	D	L	B	F	A	Pts
Ponsonby United	6	5	0	1	0	59	31	10
Grafton-Richmond	7	4	0	3	0	92	26	8
City Rovers	4	3	1	0	0	59	6	7
Otahuhu Rovers	4	2	1	1	0	33	13	5
Maritime A	6	2	0	4	0	25	66	4
Kingsland Rovers	5	1	0	4	0	17	97	2
Devonport United	2	0	0	2	0	3	40	0
Northcote & Birkenhead Ramblers	2	0	0	2	0	3	12	0
Maritime B	0	0	0	0	0	0	0	0
Marist Old Boys	0	0	0	0	0	0	0	0

==== Fifth Grade ====
Manukau won the competition and were undefeated in reported results (20-0, 17-0, 22-8, 9-3, 10-6, and 3-0). There were 17 results reported and 41 not reported. Northcote & Birkenhead withdrew after round 6 rounds, while both Ponsonby sides withdrew after 9 rounds. The round 9 match between Maritime and Grafton-Richmond was the curtain-raiser to the Auckland v England match.

Team	Pld	W	D	L	B	F	A	Pts
Manukau	6	6	0	0	0	81	17	12
Devonport United	6	4	0	2	0	75	43	7
Maritime	7	3	0	4	0	68	41	6
City Rovers	3	2	0	1	0	26	6	4
Grafton-Richmond A	1	1	0	0	2	16	5	5
Otahuhu Rovers	2	1	0	1	1	13	16	2
Grafton-Richmond B	3	0	0	3	0	2	44	0
Ponsonby United A	3	0	0	3	0	3	46	0
Ponsonby United B	0	0	0	0	0	0	0	0
Northcote & Birkenhead Ramblers	2	0	0	2	0	8	49	0

==== Sixth Grade ====
Ponsonby won the championship, sealing it with their 5-0 win over Manukau on August 14. There were only 14 results reported with 18 not reported. The round 10 match between City Rovers and the combined Grafton-Richmond side on July 24 was a curtain-raiser to the Auckland v England match.

Team	Pld	W	D	L	B	F	A	Pts
Ponsonby United	7	7	0	0	0	42	10	14
Manukau	6	3	0	3	0	15	26	6
Maritime	5	2	0	3	0	16	26	4
City Rovers	4	2	0	2	0	21	9	4
Devonport United	4	0	0	4	0	15	27	0
Grafton-Richmond	2	0	0	2	0	0	11	0

== Representative fixtures ==
Auckland played a Rest of New Zealand team as part of the selection process for the New Zealand team to play England. They trounced them by 54 points to 0. They later played a trial match between and A and B team before the Auckland side was selected to play England. The match was played at the Auckland Domain in front of 30,000 spectators. Unfortunately the English halfback fractured his tibia in the first few minutes and they were forced to play with 12 for the remainder of the game as the rules at the time did not allow for substitutions of injured players.

=== Auckland v Rest of New Zealand ===
The match was postponed a day due to bad weather and played on the Sunday.

23 June	Auckland	54–0	Rest of New Zealand	Auckland Domain 1
3:00	Try: Bill Cloke 3, Charles Woolley, Bill Davidson 3, Billy Ghent, Stan Walters 2, Wally Somers, Bert Avery; Con: Bill Davidson 9			Referee: A Ball

=== Auckland trial match ===
14 July	A Team	12–19	B Team	Victoria Park 1
3:00	Try: Joe Bennett, Charles Woolley; Con: Bill Davidson 2 Pen: Bill Davidson		Try: Ernie Herring 2, Bill Stormont, Dougie McGregor 2, George Paki; Con: Bill Stormont 2	Referee: A Ball

=== Auckland v England ===
24 July	Auckland	24–16	England	Auckland Domain 1
3:00	Try: Bill Cloke, Stan Walters 2, Wally Somers, Nelson Bass (Penalty Try), Thomas McClymont; Con: Bill Davidson 3		Try: Jonty Parkin 2, Billy Stone, Jim Bacon; Con: Billy Stone, Gwyn Thomas	Attendance: 30,000; Referee: Bill Murray

=== Auckland representative matches played and scorers ===
No	Name	Club Team	Play	Tries	Con	Pen	Points
1	Bill Davidson	City	2	3	12	0	33
2	Bill Cloke	Newton	2	4	1	0	12
2	Stan Walters	Devonport	2	4	0	0	12
4	Wally Somers	Newton	2	2	0	0	6
5	Nelson Bass	Newton	1	1	0	0	3
5	Charles Woolley	Grafton	2	1	0	0	3
5	Thomas McClymont	Ponsonby	2	1	0	0	3
5	Billy Ghent	Marist	1	1	0	0	3
5	Bert Avery	Maritime	2	1	0	0	3
10	Jim Brien	Maritime	1	0	0	0	0
10	Eric Grey	Maritime	2	0	0	0	0
10	Joe Bennett	Grafton	1	0	0	0	0
10	Vic Thomas	City	1	0	0	0	0
10	Roly Tait	Marist	1	0	0	0	0
10	Karl Ifwersen	Grafton	1	0	0	0	0
10	Clarrie Polson	Newton	1	0	0	0	0
10	Bill Stormont	Marist	1	0	0	0	0
10	Billy Wilson	City	1	0	0	0	0
10	Ivan Stewart	City	1	0	0	0	0
