= 1918 Auckland Rugby League season =

The 1918 Auckland Rugby League season was its 10th since its inception in 1909. It was again severely affected by the ongoing war with several hundred players serving overseas and 44 killed who were named in the annual report. North Shore Albions withdrew from the competition early in the season and on other occasions teams played short-handed. There was also a truncated representative program with only a trial match and one full Auckland representative match versus Canterbury, which was played at the Auckland Domain in front of 10,000 spectators.

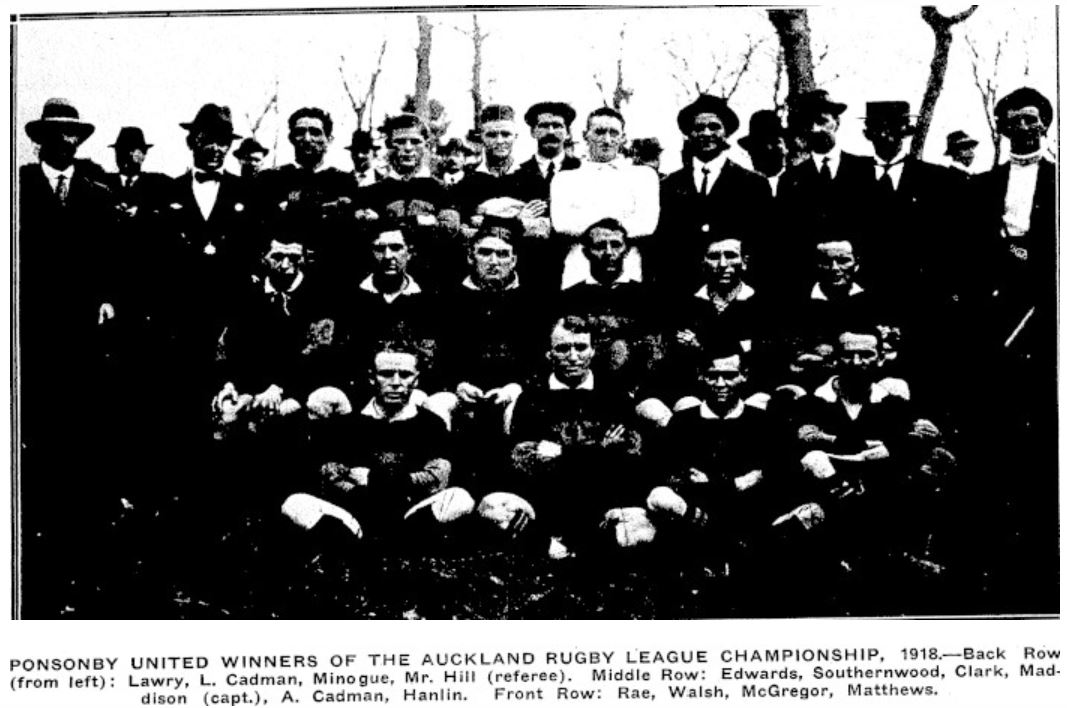
Ponsonby United, the 1918 first grade champions

The senior grade featured six teams. Ponsonby United won their second consecutive title with an 8-win–1-loss record. Ponsonby then travelled to Christchurch to play Sydenham for the Thacker Shield and they won 11 points to 0. City Rovers won their second Roope Rooster title with a 6–3 win over Maritime following their first win in 1916.

Senior games still regularly attracted strong crowds. The round 4 matches at Victoria Park drew an estimated crowd of 6,000. While 4,000 attended the round 5 matches, 5,000 the round 7 clash between City Rovers and Grafton Athletic at the same venue, and 6,000 witnessed the round 9 match between City Rovers and Ponsonby United.

At the season end many one-off matches were played between various teams. One of the more notable ones was a match between the Auckland Star staff and The New Zealand Herald staff. The game was won by the Auckland Star by 8 points to 4. These company type fixtures were to become a regular feature of Auckland Rugby League for decades to come.

Preceded by 1917	10th Auckland Rugby League season 1918	Succeeded by 1919

== News ==
=== Epidemic deaths ===
At the conclusion of the year the Auckland Rugby League took out an advertisement acknowledging the deaths of people associated with the game from the recent influenza epidemic. They included Matthew Winter Maddison of the Ponsonby club, and Montrose (Monty) Stanaway who had represented Auckland in 1915 while with the Otahuhu club before later transferring to City in 1917. And also H. Iles, Arthur Winnall, B Evans, P. Sheenan, and Francis Caulam also being mentioned along with "all others who have lost their loved ones".

=== Parnell Club ===
Although the Parnell club did not officially form until 1921 they were belatedly registered in 1918 and fielded two teams. They had a side in the 4th grade, and another in the 6th grade. Prior to the start of the season they asked the Auckland Rugby League if they could affiliate with Grafton. It was decided to leave the arrangement to the Grafton club.

The reason they had asked to affiliate was that they had been late to register as a club. They then tried to affiliate with Newton Rangers. The Auckland Star in reporting on the matter wrote the “Parnell Club requested permission to affiliate with Newton. Owing to nominations being closed, thus barring Parnell from entering teams, the Northcote Club offered to forego their nominations in the 4th and 6th grade, so as to allow the Parnell Club to participate in the competitions. Affiliation was then granted to the Parnell Club, and the offer of Northcote for the transference of nominations was referred to the Junior Advisory Board”. The New Zealand Herald said that the league granted affiliation with the Newton club.

== Competition news ==
=== Club teams by grade participation ===
Team	1st Grade	2nd Grade	3rd Grade	4th Grade	5th Grade	6th Grade	Total
City Rovers	1	1	1	0	1	1	5
Ponsonby United	1	1	0	1	2	0	5
Otahuhu Rovers	0	1	0	1	1	1	4
North Shore Albions	1	0	1	0	1	1	4
Richmond Rovers	0	0	0	1	1	1	3
Telegraph Messengers	0	0	0	1	1	1	3
Grafton Athletic	1	0	0	1	0	0	2
Newton Rangers	1	0	0	1	0	0	2
Northcote & Birkenhead Ramblers	0	0	1	0	1	0	2
Manukau Rovers	0	0	0	0	2	0	2
Parnell	0	0	0	1	0	1	2
Maritime	1	0	0	0	0	0	1
Māngere Rangers	0	1	0	0	0	0	1
Thames Old Boys	0	0	1	0	0	0	1
Sunnyside	0	0	0	1	0	0	1
Big Store	0	0	0	0	1	0	1
Total	6	4	5	9	11	6	41

=== Maritime, Mangere, and Big Store football clubs form ===
The 'Maritime Football Club' applied to join the Auckland Rugby League with the nomination of a senior team. This was accepted by the league. They finished the season with a 1 win, 7 loss record.

The Māngere club applied for affiliation and the registration of 23 players at the Auckland Rugby League meeting on 17 April. This was granted by the league. They were to play in maroon and gold originally as requested but before the season started asked to wear blue instead.

The Big Store Football Club nominated a team to play in the league which was accepted and their colours of blue and white were approved.

=== New league rooms ===
At the conclusion of the season the league opened their own league rooms on Swanson Street. The rooms were used for the first time with the Auckland Rugby League executive meeting on 23 October. The rooms consisted of "a large billiard room and League office, and a room for clubs to hold their weekly meetings in". It was stated that players did not formerly meet "their fellow players during the summer time, but with this club now on a sound footing they will be able to meet each other and spend enjoyable evenings which should bring about a better feeling between the different teams".

=== Death of George Cook in World War 1 ===
On January 14, 1918 George Cook died in France during World War 1. Originally he was a rugby player who played for many seasons for Horowhenua before moving to Wellington where he played representative rugby there too. He switched to rugby league in 1912 playing for Wellington and there gaining selection for New Zealand to play New South Wales. Cook moved to Auckland in 1913 and joined the Newton Rangers. He played in 9 matches for them and scored 33 points making him the second highest scorer. He was selected for Auckland and played in 6 matches scoring 4 tries. In 1914 he joined the Otahuhu Rovers club where he played 9 games and scored 29 points which was the 3rd most in the competition. Cook enlisted in the New Zealand Māori (Pioneer) Battalion in 1917. Cook died on October 12, 1918, from broncho-pneumonia while at the No. 7 Canadian General Hospital in the field in France. He was buried at Étaples Military Cemetery in Étaples, near Boulogne in north-west France.

=== Representative match ===
Auckland played a representative match for the first time in a few seasons. They had taken a hiatus during the war years but they played a trial match between and A and B team before a match with Canterbury at the Auckland Domain. The match attracted an enormous crowd of 10,000 and Auckland won easily by 45 points to 9.

== First grade championship ==
The 1st grade championship had been competing for the Myers Cup from 1910 to 1914 but after the beginning of the war the league decided to not award trophies though the grade competitions were still competed for as normal. The season began with 3 preliminary rounds before the competitions began proper on 18 May. Around 5,000 spectators attended the first round matches at Victoria Park and Devonport Domain. North Shore Albions played the preliminary rounds, round 1, and defaulted their next two matches before withdrawing from the competition.

=== Teams ===
The competition featured 6 teams.

- City Rovers (red and black)
- Grafton Athletic (black and white)
- Maritime (red, white, and blue)
- Newton Rangers (red and white)
- North Shore Albions (green and white)
- Ponsonby United (blue and black)

=== Statistics ===
Including the knockout games there were 32 first grade games played with 138 tries, 65 conversions, 53 penalties, no drop goals, and 5 goals from a mark. The average number of points per game was 21.5, with 4.31 tries per game. The points per game decreased from 23 in 1917 to 21.5 in 1918 and the number of tries per game decreased from 5.28 to 4.31. With 65 conversions from 138 attempts the successful percentage was 47.1. The successful conversion percentage increased from 40.9 in 1917 to 47.1 in 1918.

=== Preliminary rounds ===
==== Round 1 ====
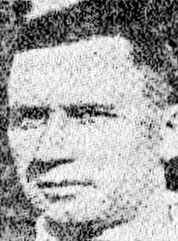

Ernie Herring debuted for Grafton. Former All Black, Dougie McGregor kicked 2 penalties for Grafton in their 27–4 loss to City. His brother Eric scored twice for Ponsonby in their 16–6 win over Ponsonby. For Newton, Wally Somers and George Iles both scored in a 23–9 win over Maritime.

27 April	City	27-4	Grafton	Victoria Park 1
3:00	Try: Unknown		Pen: Dougie McGregor 2	Referee: Archie Ferguson

27 April	Ponsonby	16-6	North Shore	Victoria Park 2
3:00	Try: Arthur Rae, Eric McGregor 2, J Moran; Con: Matthew Maddison 2		Try: Stone, unknown forward	Referee: Tyson

27 April	Newton	23-9	Maritime	Victoria Park 3
3:00	Try: Wally Somers, Arthur Iles, George Iles, Albert Ivil 2 Con: Arthur Iles, Phil Castles 3		Try: Pitman; Pen: Dufty 3	Referee: William Wynyard

==== Round 2 ====
North Shore was struggling to field a team owing to the impact of the war on their playing numbers. They only managed 11 players for their match with Maritime who were also fielding a weakened forward pack. Thomas Marchbank, a returned soldier, playing in the North Shore side broke his ankle, further handicapping the side. Marchbank was taken to Auckland Hospital. Maritime managed a tight 4–2 win over North Shore with Dufty kicking 2 penalties. Grafton also had trouble raising a team and were very late taking the field before managing to defeat Ponsonby 12-3 thanks largely to captain Karl Ifwersen scoring a try and kicking 2 penalties. He was back from overseas service after only playing one game in 1917.

4 May	Newton	15–8	City	Victoria Park 1
3:00	Try: Pitman, Bill Williams, George Iles; Con: Phil Castle 2 Pen: Phil Castle		Try: George Davidson, Jim Rukutai; Con: George Davidson	Attendance: 4,000; Referee: T Hill

4 May	Grafton	13–3	Ponsonby	Victoria Park 2
3:00	Try: Karl Ifwersen, Nicholson, Arthur Campny; Pen: Karl Ifwersen 2		Try: Arthur Rae	Attendance: 4,000; Referee: A Vause

4 May	Maritime	4–2	North Shore	Victoria Park 3
3:00	Pen: Dufty 1 (& 1 mark)		Pen: Parker	Attendance: 4,000; Referee: John Henry Eddowes

==== Round 3 ====
North Shore defaulted their match with Grafton. Ponsonby achieved a milestone of sorts becoming the first club to reach 1,000 first grade points during their match with Newton. They began the game with 983 points all time and progressed to 1,004 by the end of the match. It had taken them 72 matches to reach the mark.

11 May	City	8–3	Maritime	Victoria Park 2
3:00	Try: C Mitchell, Bill Davidson; Pen: Montrose Stanaway		Try: W Cross

11 May	Ponsonby	21–3	Newton	Victoria Park 1
3:00	Try: Matthew Maddison, Eric McGregor 2, Artie Rae 2 Con: Matthew Maddison; Pen: Matthew Maddison, Leo Minogue (mark)		Try: Bill Williams	Referee: Frank Thompson

11 May	Grafton	WBD-LBD	North Shore	Victoria Park 3
3:00

=== First Grade standings ===
Team	Pld	W	D	L	F	A	Pts
Ponsonby United	9	8	0	1	103	53	16
Newton Rangers	9	7	0	2	123	37	14
City Rovers	8	5	0	3	73	85	10
Grafton Athletic	8	2	0	6	94	125	4
Maritime	9	1	0	8	45	110	2
North Shore Albions	3	0	0	3	2	30	0

Ponsonby and Maritime both had default wins over North Shore Albions. Newton had a default win over Maritime (R9). These results are included in the standings.

=== First Grade results ===
==== Round 1 ====
18 May	Ponsonby	17–9	Grafton	Victoria Park
3:00	Try: Jim Clark, Eric McGregor, Thomas McClymont; Con: Matthew Maddison 2 Pen: Matthew Maddison 2		Try: Tremain; Pen: Karl Ifwersen 3	Attendance: 5,000; Referee: A Ball

18 May	City	15–13	Maritime	Victoria Park
3:00	Try: Bill Davidson, C Mitchell, Doran; Con: Bill Davidson; Pen: Jim Rukutai 2		Try: Hutton; Con: Dufty; Pen: Dufty 3 & 1 mark	Attendance: 5000; Referee: Bill Murray

18 May	North Shore	2–30	Newton	Devonport Domain
3:00	Pen: Parker		Try: Phil Castles, Jack Keenan, Ronald Lovett, A Thomas, unknown x 4 Con: Len Farrant, unknown x 2	Referee: William Wynyard

==== Round 2 ====
North Shore lost by default to Maritime. In the City v Grafton match the City player C. (Chook) Mitchell was ordered off by referee Vause for disputing a decision. He wrote a letter of apology during the week and the league ordered him to appear on Saturday to receive a “severe citation” George Reid (City) was knocked unconscious during their match with Grafton and was taken to hospital. While Campney, the Grafton fullback went off injured and Fife who replaced him also had to leave the field with an injury.

25 May	Ponsonby	8–7	Newton	Victoria Park
3:00	Try: William Southernwood, Eric McGregor; Con: Matthew Maddison		Try: Jack Keenan; Con: Bill Williams; Pen: Phil Castles	Referee: Archie Ferguson

25 May	City	11–10	Grafton	Victoria Park
3:00	Try: Tom Haddon, George Paki, J Hogan; Con: Montrose Stanaway		Try: Dougie McGregor, H Simpson; Con: Karl Ifwersen; Pen: Karl Ifwersen	Referee: A Vause

25 May	Maritime	WBD-LBD	North Shore	Victoria Park
3:00

==== Round 3 ====
North Shore once again defaulted and the withdrew from the first grade competition leaving 5 teams. It was stated in the New Zealand Herald that Grafton played 4 men short, though given they won 28-2 it is more likely that it was their opponents Maritime who were short of players. For Grafton, Dougie McGregor scored 2 tries, while H Simpson crossed the line 4 times. Karl Ifwersen and Mcgregor kicked 5 goals between them. Newton easily beat City 18–2 with George Iles scoring once and his brother Arthur converting 3 of their 4 tries.

1 June	Newton	18–2	City	Victoria Park 1
3:00	Try: George Iles, Leonard Newdick, W Miller, Jack Keenan; Con: Arthur Isles 3		Pen: Ernie Asher	Referee: Frank Thompson

1 June	Grafton	28–2	Maritime	Victoria Park 2
3:00	Try: H Simpson 4, Dougie McGregor 2 Con: Karl Ifwersen 2, Dougie McGregor 2 Pen: Karl Ifwersen		Pen: Dufty	Referee: T Hill

1 June	Ponsonby	WBD-LBD	North Shore	Victoria Park 3
3:00				Referee: E Dempsey

==== Round 4 ====
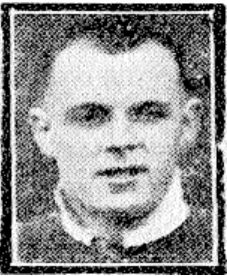
Wally Somers

Future New Zealand hooker, Wally Somers scored twice for Newton in their 16–0 win over Maritime.

8 June	Ponsonby	20–7	City	Victoria Park 1
3:00	Try: William Hanlon, Eric McGregor 2, Arthur Cadman; Con: Matthew Maddison 3 Pen: Matthew Maddison		Try: George Reid; Pen: Jim Rukutai 2	Attendance: 6,000; Referee: William Wynyard

8 June	Newton	16–0	Maritime	Victoria Park 2
3:00	Try: Wally Somers 2, A Thomas, Arthur Mansill; Con: Arthur Isles; Pen: Bill Williams			Attendance: 6,000; Referee: F Tyson

==== Round 5 ====
Sheehan was ordered off for Maritime in their match with Ponsonby for striking Arthur Matthews.

22 June	Newton	13–2	Grafton	Victoria Park 1
3:00	Try: Jack Keenan, George Iles, Arthur Isles; Con: Arthur Isles, Phil Castles		Pen: Karl Ifwersen	Attendance: 4,000; Referee: Bill Murray

22 June	Ponsonby	21–6	Maritime	Victoria Park 2
3:00	Try: Arthur Matthews 2, Eric McGregor 2, unknown 1 Con: Matthew Maddison 3		Try: George Davidson, Vivian Hogg	Attendance: 4,000; Referee: A Ball

==== Round 6 ====
29 June	Ponsonby	18–7	Grafton	Victoria Park 1
3:00	Try: Laurie Cadman 2, W Hanlon, Thomas McClymont; Con: Matthew Maddison 3		Try: Tremain; Con: Karl Ifwersen; Pen: Karl Ifwersen	Attendance: 5,000; Referee: A Ball

29 June	City	11–7	Maritime	Victoria Park 2
3:00	Try: C Mitchell 2, Bob Clark; Con: Jim Rukutai		Try: Kent; Pen: Dufty (and 1 mark)	Attendance: 5,000; Referee: Archie Ferguson

==== Round 7 ====
The two round 7 matches were played over 2 Saturday's. Remarkably the match between Newton and Ponsonby at the Domain on July 13 was recorded with footage of the game surviving and being archived on The New Zealand Archive of Film, Television and Sound Ngā Taonga website.

6 July	City	25–15	Grafton	Victoria Park 1
3:00	Try: Bill Davidson, Ivan Stewart, Bob Clark 2, Tom Haddon; Con: Bill Davidson 2 Pen: Bill Davidson 2, Jim Rukutai		Try: Karl Ifwersen, Dougie McGregor, Tremain; Con: Karl Ifwersen 3	Attendance: 5,000; Referee: A Vause

13 July	Newton	11–10	Ponsonby	Auckland Domain
3:00	Try: George Iles, Jack Keenan, Ronald Lovett; Pen: W Miller		Try: William Southernwood, W Edwards; Con: Matthew Maddison 2	Attendance: 7,000; Referee: Hill

==== Round 8 ====
A player from each team in the City - Newton match was ordered off for rough play though the newspapers did not name who they were.

20 July	City	2–0	Newton	Victoria Park 1
3:00	Pen: Harry Francis			Attendance: 4,000; Referee: William Wynyard

20 July	Grafton	12–11	Maritime	Victoria Park 2
3:00	Try: Tremaine, Percy Pullen; Con: Karl Ifwersen 2 Pen: Karl Ifwersen		Try: A Cross, Dufty, penalty try Con: Dufty	Attendance: 4,000; Referee: E Dempsey

==== Round 9 ====
Late in the match between Ponsonby and City, Montrose (Monty) Stanaway and Arthur Cadman exchanged blows and were sent off by referee Archie Ferguson. The board decided during the week that a mistake has been made in ordering off Cadman but that Stanaway be "severely cautioned against further infringements".

27 July	Ponsonby	2–0	City	Victoria Park 1
3:00	Pen: Matthew Maddison			Attendance: 6,500; Referee: Archie Ferguson

27 July	Newton	WBD-LBD	Maritime	Victoria Park 2
3:00

==== Round 10 ====
Ponsonby's narrow win over Maritime meant that they won the championship without the need for a playoff with Newton who were left 2 points behind them. Laurie Cadman (Ponsonby) was sent off for striking Cross late in the game with Cross also sent off. The board decided to suspend Cadman for 4 playing Saturday's while the case against Cross was dismissed. F Strickland, the Wellington representative back had moved to Auckland and debuted on the wing for Ponsonby.

3 August	Ponsonby	7–6	Maritime	Victoria Park 1
3:00	Try: Eric McGregor; Con: Matthew Maddison; Pen: Matthew Maddison (1 mark)		Try: Vivian Hogg, George Davidson	Attendance: 5,000; Referee: Archie Ferguson

3 August	Newton	28–11	Grafton	Victoria Park
3:00	Try: George Iles, F Gregory, A Thomas 2, Jack Keenan 2 Con: George Iles 2, Phil Castle 2, Jack Keenan		Try: Karl Ifwersen; Con: Karl Ifwersen; Pen: Karl Ifwersen 3	Attendance: 5,000; Referee: Wheatley

== Roope Rooster knockout competition ==
=== Round 1 ===
Many years later when reminiscing about his career Ernie Asher while watching a game at Carlaw Park was heard to say "my biggest thrill ever in football was back in 1915 or 16... Ponsonby were 100 to 1 on favourite to beat us. I was playing at the Domain and I was on the sideline with a crook shoulder. One bloke got knocked out and I had to go on and we beat Ponsonby with my kicking. Yes, that was my biggest thrill in football". He was most likely referring to this rounds match between City and Ponsonby which was in fact played in 1918 as it was one of their only meetings in this era on the Domain and where Asher kicked goals in a City win. Asher had only played in their 11 May, and 1 June matches due to his injury and it was his last ever match for City. Interestingly after issues with halfbacks putting the ball into the scrum it was decided to trial referees putting it in and it was said to be "a decided advantage" in the City v Ponsonby game.

10 August	City	15–10	Ponsonby	Auckland Domain 1
3:00	Try: Robert Clark, Harry Francis, C Mitchell; Con: Ernie Asher; Pen: Ernie Asher 2		Try: Eric McGregor, Artie Rae; Con: W Hanlon; Pen: Matthew Maddison	Attendance: 6,500; Referee: Frank Thompson

The match between Newton and Grafton raised money for Spence (Spencer) Jones who had badly injured himself playing at the end of the previous season and spent a long time in hospital.

17 August	Maritime	16–11	Grafton	Victoria Park 1
3:00	Try: Vivian Hogg, George Davidson, Herb Lunn 2 Con: Ernest Stallworthy, Dufty		Try: Karl Ifwersen; Con: T Taylor; Pen: Karl Ifwersen 3	Attendance: 3,000; Referee: T Hill

=== Semi final ===
24 August	Maritime	13–8	Newton	Auckland Domain
3:00	Try: Tom Sheehan, Hogg, Dufty; Con: Stallworthy; Pen: George Davidson		Try: W Miller, Jack Keenan; Pen: Arthur Isles	Attendance: 5,500; Referee: A Ball

=== Final ===
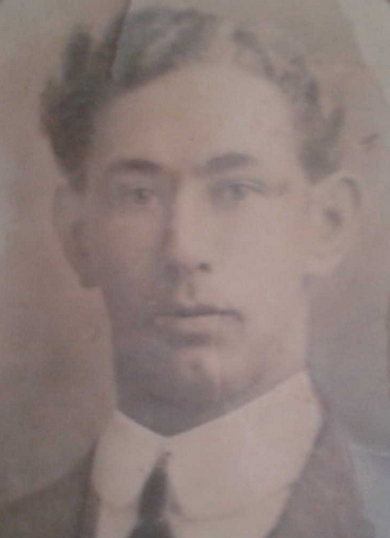
Montrose (Monty) Stanaway, the City hooker who passed away due to the flu epidemic on November 9 aged 27.

Montrose (Monty) Stanaway, the outstanding City hooker, played his last ever game for City. On November 9 he became a victim of the influenza epidemic and died at Auckland Hospital. Monty was the brother of Jack Stanaway who played for the New Zealand Māori rugby league team in 1908, and Alex Stanaway who played for New Zealand Māori and New Zealand. Their mother was Māori, Anihera (Susan) Stanaway and their father William Henry Stanaway. Monty played for Otahuhu Rovers from 1914 until 1917 when their senior team folded, playing 29 games and scoring 12 points. He then joined the City Rovers senior side playing 12 games, and kicking a goal in the 1918 season. He was survived by his wife, Muriel and was aged 27. The final saw the novice Maurice Wetherill score a try for City. He would go on to play for New Zealand and referee international matches. City's other try scorer was Huatahi Paki, the brother of George Paki. They were from the Waikato though played much of their rugby league in Auckland and Huatahi was the first New Zealand 'breed' rugby league player to play in Australia when he joined St. George for the 1923 season.

31 August	City	6–3	Maritime	Auckland Domain 1
3:00	Try: Maurice Wetherill, Huatahi Paki		Try: George Davidson	Attendance: 7,000; Referee: William Wynyard

== Top try scorers and point scorers ==
The following point scoring lists include both Senior Championship matches (including preliminary rounds) and the Roope Rooster competition. For the 5th time in 6 seasons Karl Ifwersen topped the point scoring lists with 66 points. This gave him 287 points from 6 seasons. While Eric McGregor (brother of Kiwi Dougie McGregor) of Ponsonby United topped the try scoring list with 10. Newton Rangers had 4 tries and 2 conversions unattributed while Ponsonby had 1 try unattributed which make the point lists for those teams slightly incomplete.

Rank	Player	Team	Tries
1	Eric McGregor	Ponsonby	10
2	Jack Keenan	Newton	8
3	H Simpson	Grafton	5
3	C Mitchell	City	5
5	Bill Davidson	City	4
5	George Iles	Newton	4
5	Thomas	Newton	4
5	Robert (Bob) Clarke	City	4
5	Arthur (Artie) Rae	Ponsonby	4
5	George Davidson	Maritime	4
5	Vivian Hogg	Maritime	4
5	Karl Ifwersen	Grafton	4
5	Tremain	Grafton	4
5	Dougie McGregor	Grafton	4

Rank	Player	Team	Tries	Con	Pen	Mark	Points
1	Karl Ifwersen	Grafton	4	11	16	0	66
2	Matthew Maddison	Ponsonby	1	16	6	1	49
3	Dufty	Maritime	2	3	7	2	30
3	Eric McGregor	Ponsonby	10	0	0	0	30
5	Jack Keenan	Newton	8	1	0	0	26
6	Bill Davidson	City	4	4	2	0	24

== Thacker Shield ==
Ponsonby United (blue and black) travelled south to Christchurch to play a match with Sydenham (red and blue) for the Thacker Shield. They were victorious and brought the shield to Auckland. The team was managed by Ivan Culpan. A Smith who was in the reserves ended up being a line umpire for the match. Sydenham had held the shield since 1913 when they defended it against North Shore Albions, before defending it again in 1914 against Athletic of Wellington. The war years had seen a hiatus in competition for it. Ponsonby were to win it and it remained in Auckland for a period of time before it was decided by the donor that it should be a trophy played for by South Island teams only where it has remained so ever since. Bill King the future New Zealand international moved out of the forwards and started the game as an extra back (in the first five eighth) position, leaving just 5 men in the scrum. In the second half Ponsonby did the same with Laurie Cadman moving into the backs and this saw Ponsonby's back play improve increasing their 3-0 half time lead to 11–0 by full time. Matthew Winter Maddison kicked a penalty and was Ponsonby's top point scorer for the season. 10 weeks later on November 22 he died, a victim of the influenza epidemic aged just 30. He was born in Wallsend, New South Wales in 1888. His obituary in the Auckland Star said "Mr. M. Maddison, who died of pneumonia last week was a member of the Ponsonby United Football Club, and captained their senior team which last season won the Auckland rugby league championship. He was a very popular player, and a valuable member of his club. He kicked 25 goals, equal to 50 points, out of a total or 103 scored by the team during the championship matches. He was captain of the club's team that tourned Christchurch to compete for Dr. Thacker's challenge shield. The tour proved a success, the team winning by 11 points to nil, and the shield is now in Auckland". In 14 games for Ponsonby he scored 2 tries and kicked 26 goals for 58 points. He was buried at Waikaraka Cemetery.

31 August	Sydenham	0–11	Ponsonby	Sydenham Park, Christchurch
3:00			Try: Arthur Rae, Bill Walsh, Arthur Matthews; Pen: Matthew Maddison	Referee: A.E. Hooper

== Lower grade clubs ==
The lower grades featured teams in the 2nd grade (5), 3rd grade (5), 4th grade (9), 5th grade (11), and 6th grade (4).

A team named "Big Store" was entered in the 5th grade competition. They were essentially a company team representing George Court & Sons. Their motto at the time was "Big Store" in reference to its range of goods in their Karangahape Road store. During the season they asked the Auckland Rugby League if they could be affiliated to the Newton Rangers club. The league delayed a decision as they had earlier asked to be affiliated to the City Rovers club before changing their mind. The affiliation with Newton was later affirmed. The team was however thrown out of the competition after an incident in a match in early August. They were suspended until the end of the following (1919 season), and their captain, Crawley was suspended for 3 seasons.

=== Second grade ===
Ōtāhuhu Rovers won the championship. While fixtures were reported in the newspapers each week there were only 2 scores reported in the entire season along with 1 other result (City defeating Māngere Rangers in round 1). This renders the standings below to be extremely inaccurate. Grafton withdrew after round 1 and have not been included in the standings as it is unlikely they fielded a side, while Ponsonby withdrew after round 7.

Team	Pld	W	D	L	B	F	A	Pts
Otahuhu Rovers	8	2	0	0	1	28	0	4
City Rovers	9	1	0	1	0	0	14	2
Māngere Rangers	8	0	0	2	3	0	14	0
Ponsonby United	5	0	0	0	1	0	0	0

=== Third grade ===
North Shore won the championship. There were only 11 scores reported from 26 scheduled matches.

Team	Pld	W	D	L	B	F	A	Pts
North Shore Albions	11	5	0	1	2	61	32	10
Manukau	10	3	0	1	2	54	19	6
Thames Old Boys	10	3	0	1	2	21	46	6
Northcote & Birkenhead Ramblers	11	0	0	5	2	25	52	0
City Rovers	10	0	0	3	2	10	22	0

=== Fourth grade ===
Telegraph Messengers won the championship, sealing it on September 7 with a 15–2 win over Newton. Parnell, Manukau, and Otahuhu all withdrew from the competition after round 9. Ponsonby withdrew 1 round later. There were 23 scores reported and 23 unreported.

Team	Pld	W	D	L	B	F	A	Pts
Telegraph Messengers	12	8	0	1	2	102	36	16
Richmond Rovers	13	5	0	1	1	34	25	10
Newton Rangers	12	4	1	3	1	54	51	9
Grafton Athletic	12	2	0	2	1	13	2	4
Sunnyside	12	1	0	3	1	30	49	2
Ponsonby United	8	1	0	3	0	17	26	2
Otahuhu Rovers	8	1	0	3	0	19	49	2
Manukau	7	0	1	0	1	3	12	1
Parnell	8	0	0	5	1	19	41	0

=== Fifth grade ===
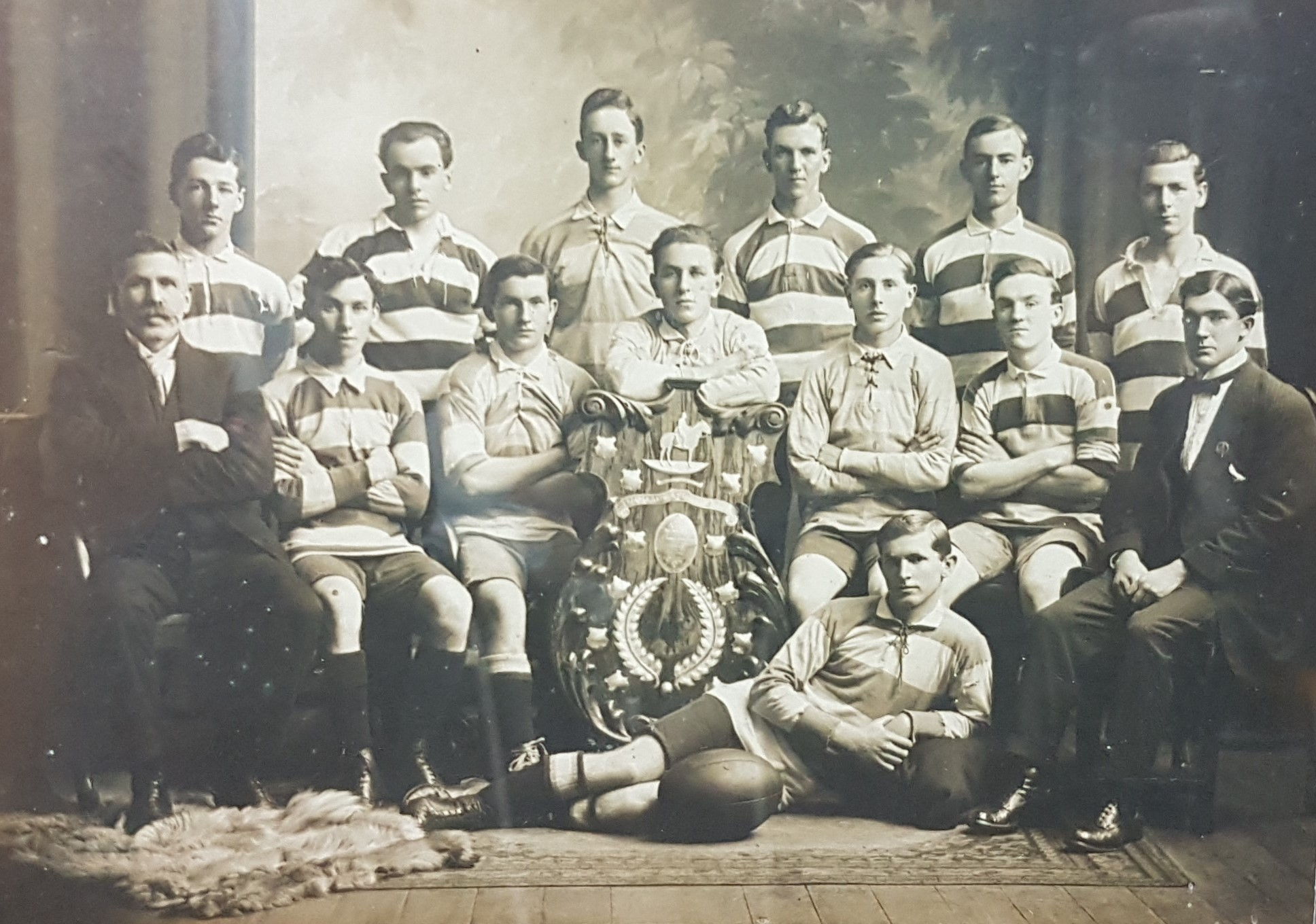
The championship winning Otahuhu side.

Otahuhu won the championship after defeating City in the final on September 14. There were many results not reported however the Otahuhu standings and for and against record are correct as they are displayed on their championship winning photograph in their present-day club rooms. Telegraph Messengers, Manukau B, and Ponsonby B all withdrew after 11 rounds, while Manukau A and Northcote & Birkenhead Ramblers withdrew a week later. Big Store was removed from the competition by the ARL due to a disciplinary issue in an August match. They were suspended until the end of 1919 but failed to ever take part in Auckland Rugby League again. 23 scores were reported, with 34 scores not reported.

Team	Pld	W	D	L	B	F	A	Pts
Otahuhu Rovers	14	13	0	1	0	244	10	26
City Rovers	13	7	0	2	1	94	19	14
Richmond Rovers	11	5	0	2	3	104	50	10
Ponsonby United A	12	4	0	2	1	42	38	8
Northcote & Birkenhead Ramblers	11	1	0	2	1	48	30	2
North Shore Albions	13	1	0	4	1	52	39	2
Manukau A	11	1	0	1	1	13	19	2
Telegraph Messengers	10	1	0	4	1	11	82	2
Manukau B	10	0	0	4	1	9	122	0
Big Store	9	0	0	3	1	0	49	0
Ponsonby United B	10	0	0	3	0	0	77	0

=== Sixth grade ===
City won the championship. There were 23 results reported and 23 not reported.

Team	Pld	W	D	L	B	F	A	Pts
City Rovers	15	11	0	1	0	145	9	22
Richmond Rovers	14	4	1	5	0	39	46	9
Otahuhu Rovers	11	4	0	2	0	29	22	8
Parnell	15	1	1	4	1	20	46	3
North Shore Albions	13	1	0	4	1	12	35	2
Telegraph Messengers	14	1	0	6	0	19	106	2

== Exhibition matches ==
On 21 September a match was played between the Auckland Rugby League referees and officials of the league. The referees won by 14 points to 4 with it being refereed by Jim Rukutai. Richmond and the Telegraph Messengers 4th grade teams travelled to Thames to play an exhibition match on 12 October. Telegraph Messengers had been winners of the championship with Richmond the runners up.

Date		Score		Score	Venue
12 Oct	Telegraph Messengers	12	Richmond	10	Thames

== Representative fixtures ==
Harold Rowe was appointed the sole selector for the Auckland Rugby League on August 7. On 7 September a trial match was held between two teams picked by the selectors at Victoria Park in order to select the Auckland representative team. The A team was Bill Minogue, Bill Walsh, Thomas McClymont, Jim Clark (Ponsonby), Dougie McGregor, Karl Ifwersen, Ernie Bailey, Ernie Herring (Grafton), George Iles (Newton), George Davidson (Maritime), Jim Rukutai, Tom Haddon, Harry Francis (City, while the B Team was George Paki, Ivan Stewart (City), Eric McGregor, Matthew Maddison, Arthur Cadman (Ponsonby), A Thomas, Jack Keenan, Bill Williams (Newton), Percy Pullen, H Simpson (Grafton), Bert Avery, A (Tab) Cross, Tom Sheehan (Maritime), with William Hanlon (Ponsonby), Ernest Stallworthy (Maritime), Bob Clarke (City), and Arthur Keenan (Newton) named in the reserves. The following weekend Auckland played Canterbury at the Auckland Domain and were victorious by 45 points to 9.

=== Trial match ===
7 September	A Team	36–15	B Team	Victoria Park 1
3:00	Try: George Davidson 2, Bob Clarke, Karl Ifwersen, Dougie McGregor, unknown x 7 points Con: George Davidson 2, Dougie McGregor 2, Phil Castles; Pen: Karl Ifwersen, Phil Castles		Try: C Mitchell, A Thomas, Bert Avery; Con: Jack Keenan; Pen: Jack Keenan	Attendance: 5,000; Referee: Billy Murray

=== Auckland v Canterbury ===
The match saw 10,000 spectators attend and took in 300 pounds in gate takings.

14 September	Auckland	45–9	Canterbury	Auckland Domain
3:00	Try: George Davidson 5, Karl Ifwersen 2, Tom Haddon 2, George Iles, Thomas McClymont; Con: Karl Ifwersen 4, Phil Castles, Ernie Bailey		Try: Young; Pen: Mitchell, Smythe 2 marks	Attendance: 10,000; Referee: A Ball

=== Auckland representative matches played and scorers ===
No	Name	Club Team	Play	Tries	Con	Pen	Points
1	George Davidson	Maritime	1	5	0	0	15
2	Karl Ifwersen	Grafton	1	2	4	0	14
3	Tom Haddon	City	1	2	0	0	6
4	George Iles	Newton	1	1	0	0	3
4	Thomas McClymont	Ponsonby	1	1	0	0	3
6	Phil Castle	Newton	1	0	1	0	2
6	Ernie Bailey	Grafton*	1	0	1	0	2
8	George Paki	City	1	0	0	0	0
8	Dougie McGregor	Grafton	1	0	0	0	0
8	Bill Walsh	Ponsonby	1	0	0	0	0
8	Jim Rukutai	City	1	0	0	0	0
8	Bill Williams	Newton	1	0	0	0	0
8	Ernie Herring	Grafton	1	0	0	0	0

Ernie Bailey had begun the season with North Shore but after they withdrew their senior team from the competition he transferred to the Grafton Athletic team.
