= Tom Haddon =

New Zealand international rugby league footballer

Personal information
- Full name: Arthur Thompson Haddon
- Born: 6 March 1886 Yorkshire, England
- Died: 26 July 1976 (aged 90) New Zealand

Playing information
- Position: Wing, Lock
Club
Years	Team	Pld	T	G	FG	P
1910–13	North Shore Albions	16	4	0	0	12
1914–15	Grafton Athletic	13	2	0	0	6
1918–19	City Rovers	16	3	0	0	9
1925	North Shore Albions	8	4	0	0	12
	Total	53	13	0	0	39
Representative
Years	Team	Pld	T	G	FG	P
1912	Auckland B	1	0	0	0	0
1918–19	Auckland	2	5	0	0	15
1919	New Zealand Trial	1	0	0	0	0
1919	New Zealand	2	0	0	0	0

Arthur Thompson "Tom" Haddon (6 March 1886 — 26 July 1976) was a New Zealand rugby league player. He was Kiwi number 136 after playing two tests for New Zealand against Australia in 1919.

== Early life ==
Arthur Thompson Haddon was born in Yorkshire, England and came to New Zealand in 1910. He joined the North Shore Albions that same year and played for their senior side.

== Playing career ==
=== North Shore Albions ===
Tom Haddon played for North Shore Albions from 1910 until 1913 before he joined Grafton Athletic in their first season. In 1914, he was elected on to their committee and also was chosen as one of their selectors. At this stage of his career he played primarily on the wing before later on moving into the forwards.

In 1915, he played in several matches later in the season including the final which Grafton won 10 points to 5 over City to claim their only ever first grade title. He enlisted in the WW1 effort and departed in 1916 which temporarily stalled his playing career.

=== City Rovers, Auckland, and New Zealand ===
After his return from war where he was a Lance Corporal, Haddon first appeared for City Rovers in 1918 in the Auckland Rugby League competition, playing for them against Grafton Athletic in a preliminary round to open the season. The North Shore senior side had folded almost immediately at the start of the season meaning that Haddon would have been able to transfer easily to the City club. He scored a try in a Round 3 match against Grafton Athletic at Victoria Park where he “received a cross-kick and scored underneath the posts” with City going on to win 11–10. He scored against the same opponents in the second round in front of 5,000 spectators again at Victoria Park.

He was selected for the Auckland team in 1918 and played in the first proper inter provincial match that Auckland had played since 1915 (when they played Thames twice, and Lower Waikato once). During the war the Auckland Rugby League had decided to largely cease its representative program. Haddon's debut was against Canterbury and it resulted in a comfortable 45–9 victory to Auckland with Haddon scoring twice. The match was played in front of 10,000 spectators at the Auckland Domain.

In 1919 Haddon was again playing for City and in a round two match against North Shore Albions on the Devonport Domain in front of 500 spectators he scored a rare try.

On 9 August, Haddon played for Auckland in a match against Hawke's Bay at Eden Park before a crowd of 9,000. Haddon scored 3 tries in a 38 to 13 victory. As this was to be his last game for Auckland it meant that he had scored 3 tries for his City team in 2 full seasons of club rugby league but managed to cross the line 5 times for Auckland in just 2 appearances.

Haddon had been picked to tour Australia with the New Zealand team in June and July 1919 but due to circumstances was unable to make the trip. He was however selected for the 3rd and 4th tests against the touring Australian team in August/September. On 6 September, Tom Haddon became Kiwi number 136 when he played lock in front of 24,300 spectators at the Auckland Domain. New Zealand were defeated 34 to 23.

In the third test also played on the Domain, New Zealand was heavily beaten by 32 points to 2 with Haddon moving into the prop position.

In April, 1920 Auckland Rugby League gave its permission for Haddon to “play in any district outside Auckland”. Then on May 10 the New Zealand Rugby League Council granted him an open transfer to play in Australia as reported in The New Zealand Herald. The Auckland Star suggesting that he “will probably play in Australia”. He moved to Sydney and began the 1920 season playing for the Eastern Suburbs second grade team but broke his leg early in the season. It is unclear who he played for beyond this point.

=== North Shore Albions ===
In 1925 Haddon resumed playing rugby league in Auckland, this time however he was to represent the North Shore Albions who at this time were in fact named Devonport United after amalgamating with the Sunnyside League Football Club at the start of the 1920 season. The first mention of him in a Devonport uniform is in a match against his old City Rovers team at Carlaw Park where he scored a try. The day was significant for other reasons as the teams stood in silence before the kick off out of respect for Bill Stormont (Kiwi #140) who had died two days earlier. In a July match Haddon scored a try in front of 9,000 spectators at Carlaw Park against Marist Old Boys. Devonport won but not before Haddon was sent off along with Marist's New Zealand international Jim O'Brien after a “rough-up” between the two. Devonport won the match 19–11.

After a July match between Ponsonby and Devonport it was said of Haddon “it is surprising how youth sticks to some footballers. On Saturday the veteran said it was easily Devonport’s best forward. He showed a lot of pace and some of the form displayed several years ago when playing for City”. Then against Athletic “Haddon, following up fast secured, and beating several Athletic players, scored behind the posts with three men hanging on to him”. He scored a second try later in the match after a “passing rush” in which all the Devonport players took part. Haddon's final ever senior league match was in a Roope Rooster semi final loss to his old City Rovers team.

In 1926, 27, 28, and again in 1934 Haddon played in several veteran player exhibition matches. On October 30, 1926 Haddon made an appearance in an end of season game played between well known league veterans at Carlaw Park. Haddon was representing early New Zealand rugby league legends Albert Asher’s team against William Wynyard’s team. The match finished 10-10 and featured the likes of Joe Bennett, Bill Davidson, and Thomas McClymont. In September, 1927 he was chosen in a Devonport United veteran team. Then again in October he played for Albert Asher’s team against “Shaver” Hargreaves team. The match featured Ernie Asher, Jim Rukutai, Thomas McClymont, Dougie McGregor, Billy Wynyard, Bill Davidson, George Davidson, and Bert Laing. He played in another match in 1928 between City and Ponsonby and then again in 1934 once again for Albert Asher’s team.

=== Mt Albert Selector ===
In 1935 Tom Haddon was elected as a selector for the Mount Albert United Football Club which was a role he held for several seasons including in 1939 when Mount Albert won their first ever Fox Memorial title while coached by Stan Prentice.

== Personal life ==
In 1914, he was living on Grey Street in Devonport and working as a 'cutter' according to electoral roles.

In 1919, Haddon married Myra Opal Spraggon on 11 November. They had three sons: Donald Robinson Haddon, Robert Thompson Haddon (1923—1967), and Ronald Stephenson Haddon (1926—2016).
