= Telegraph Messengers Rugby League Club =

Defunct NZ rugby league club, based in Auckland

Telegraph Messengers
Club information
- Full name: Post and Telegraph Football Club
- Nickname(s): Post and Telegraph
- Short name: Telegraph Messengers
- Founded: 1916
- Exited: 1919

Former details
- Ground: Victoria Park
- Competition: Auckland Rugby League

The Telegraph Messengers Club was a rugby league club in Auckland, New Zealand which existed from 1916 to 1919. They competed in the Auckland Rugby League lower grade competitions. They were initially affiliated to the Ponsonby United club before amalgamating with the Maritime Football Club during the 1920 season. They were composed of telegraph messengers for the Post and Telegraph organisation hence their name.

== History ==
=== 1916 formation and debut season ===
On May 8, 1916 “the Telegraph Messengers Club wrote nominating a team for the sixth grade, and the secretary was instructed to make the necessary arrangements for affiliation”. The Observer newspaper said that they were “messenger boys”. They were affiliated with the Ponsonby United club which was common for lower grade teams when forming. Ultimately they entered a Fifth grade team and played their first match against Grafton Athletic at Devonport No. 1 at 2pm on May 20. The score was not reported however they lost the match. The Telegraph Messengers club had protested the result arguing that Emiraldi who played for Grafton was in fact a member of the North Shore Albions. The protest was initially upheld by the junior board but then reversed by the ARL board as Emeraldi was not a member of the North Shore side.

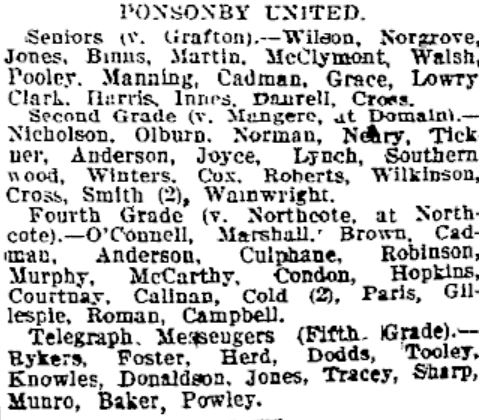
Telegraph Messengers team listed under the Ponsonby United club name who they were originally affiliated with.

Their next match was against North Shore Albions at Victoria Park at 12:45 on May 27. They lost 7 to 6. Their team was listed for the first time and included the following names: Bykers, Foster, Herd (captain), Dodds, Tooley, Knowles, Donaldson, Jones, Tracey, Sharp, Munro, Baker, and Powley. It was reported in late May that the Auckland Rugby League chairman, Dick Benson was having a busy time as an instructor of the junior clubs and he was presently working with the Telegraph Messenger side. The Observer newspaper wrote in early June that “Mr. Sinclair, the organiser of the Telegraph Messengers’ Football Club, is a recent arrival to Auckland from Christchurch, where he has played in the senior grade in past seasons. At present Mr. Sinclair is assisting in coaching the messenger boys, and in all probability will shortly be found donning the jersey for one of the Auckland city teams”.

The Star (Christchurch) wrote that “from a private letter received in Christchurch, I learn that C.R. Sinclair, who played for the Northern Suburbs Junior team last season, and who has since been transferred to Auckland, has been successful in forming a League club among the telegraph messengers, with a membership of fifty, and the majority of them players. Mr. Sinclair pays tribute to the league officials in Auckland, who he says, are keen and wide awake, and gave him every assistance”. He was Charles Sinclair and had transferred to Auckland from the Telegraph Dispatch in April, 1915. He also wrote that the Ponsonby Club (which Telegraph Messengers were affiliated with) “is doing everything possible for the youths and schoolboys”. On June 10 the side played Ōtāhuhu Rovers. The behaviour of the Ōtāhuhu team was remarked on at the Wednesday, Auckland Rugby League meeting with chairman Benson saying “this kind of thing will have to be dealt with firmly” when commenting on the ”unruly conduct of the Ōtāhuhu players in the fifth grade match against Telegraph Messengers on Saturday”. It was then decided to caution the entire side. The side struggled to get results, losing to North Shore, Manukau 7–8, Grafton Athletic 2–3, and Ōtāhuhu 5–8, though they were competitive in most matches. Their scorers were rarely reported in the newspapers though their loss to Ōtāhuhu said their try scorer was Dodd, and Knowles converted the try. Heavier defeats followed against North Shore (2–19), and Manukau (7–14) though the later match was awarded to Telegraph Messengers after they protested against a refereeing decision and the Auckland Rugby League agreed. This was the only recorded ‘win’ of their season and following an unreported score against City on August 5 their debut season came to an end. They finished having played 11 matches, with 1 win, 7 losses and 3 unreported results. They scored at least 29 points and had at least 59 scored against them finishing approximately last of the 6 sides. At the end of the season their secretary, Sinclair wrote a letter to the league thanking them for their assistance during the season. In Ponsonby's annual meeting at the start of the following season their annual report recorded that “the club entered one team in each of the first, second, fourth, and sixth grades, and the Telegraph Club, which is affiliated, entered one team in the fifth grade: although no honours came their way, they put up a good performance, which is a credit to the club”.

=== 1917, Fifth and Sixth Grade teams ===
The 1917 saw the Telegraph Messengers fielding two teams, once again a fifth grade side was entered, joined by a sixth grade team. The fifth grade side for their opening game against City Rovers A at Victoria Park was: Mathieson, Herd, Richards, Dodds, Knowles, Paris, Donaldson, Campbell, Munro, Bennett, Shaw, Baker (captain), and Powley. While the sixth grade team to play Richmond was: Clayton, Page (captain), Mackey, Cooke, Keefe, Curson, Curtis, Otway, Lee, O’Brien, Churton, Smith, and Pound. The Observer reported at the beginning of the season that "the Telegraph Messengers are entering two teams this year. Manager Sinclair is proving his worth and is to be congratulated on the way he controls his lads. At a recent meeting of the league it was mentioned that not one complaint was raised against the team during last season. Truly a good record".

The fifth grade side had what was possibly their first on field win when they beat City A by 12 points to 3. However the sixth grade side lost their first ever match going down to Richmond Rovers 7–3. In late May two players joined their sides; Walter George Caddy registering from Richmond to join their 6th grade team, with S Grinlinton joining their 5th grade side from the Newton Rangers club. Towards the end of the season their team lineups were published and the Sixth grade side featured two players named “Cooke”. It is highly likely that one of them is Bert Cooke who went on to become a famous New Zealand rugby international and then later a New Zealand rugby league international. He would have returned to Auckland from his schooling in Hamilton around this time aged 15–16 and was a messenger for the Post and Telegraph Department. He was also known to have played rugby league in the 1910s before joining the Grafton rugby club around 1920.

The Fifth grade side only had 3 of their 12 results reported with the win over City and 2 losses to North Shore and City Rovers B. While the Sixth grade side won 1, lost 7 from 11 games with 3 results unreported.

=== 1918, Three teams and a Fourth Grade championship title ===
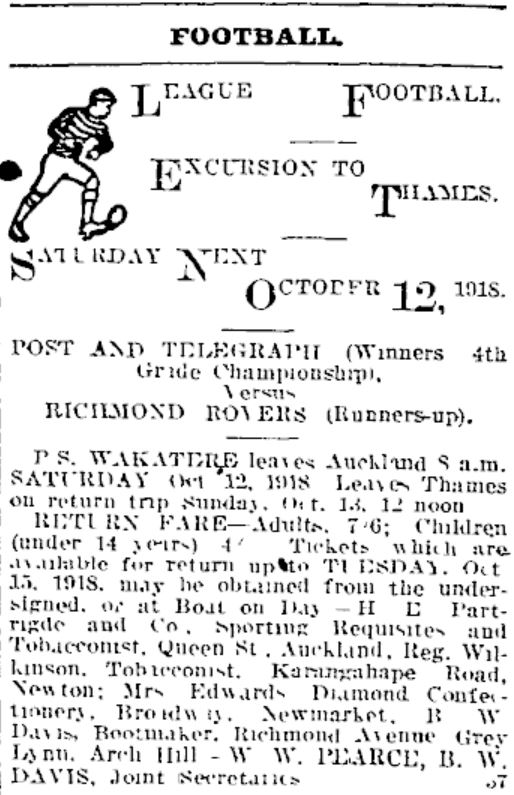
Advertisement for their October 12, 1918 trip to Thames to play Richmond Rovers.

The 1918 season saw the Telegraph Messengers field three teams for the first time and also saw them win their first and only grade championship. Their Fourth grade side won the competition when they defeated Newton Rangers 15 to 2 on September 7. Cliff and Knowles each scored 2 tries, while Bennett kicked a goal. Of their 12 games played they won 8, lost 1, and had 3 scores unreported. Their Fifth Grade side was not so successful, playing 10 games and winning 1 and losing 4 of the games that had results reported. Several of their losses were heavy (0-42, 0–19, and 0–16). While the Sixth grade side also struggled, with 1 win, 6 losses and 7 scores unreported. They had trouble on attack with scores of 2, 0, 2, 0, 0, and 2, before a 13–5 win over Richmond to end their season.

In mid season the Herald published all three teams to play in the July 20 matches. The Fourth Grade side included: N. Dodds (captain), E. Smith, G. Baker, H. Munro, W. Tracey, Herd, A. Bennett, B. Daly, H. Knowles, D. Campbell, S. Sharpe, R. Cliffe, and L. Manley. The fifth grade team named was A. Page, Caddy, W. Whittington, L, Baker, Walker, Menzies, Keefe, Daly, Pearce, Clayton, Dean, Troup, O’Brien, Smith, and McIntosh. While the Sixth grade side was: B. Sweeney, W. Somers, G. McLean, C. Moore, L. Moore, R. Grantly, R. Kelly, S. Dowle, R. Sandford, Wigg, Sleave, Brown, G. Sutherland, D. Sallen, Sampson, and Clark.

At the end of the season the Telegraph Messengers fourth grade side travelled to Thames by the Wakatere Steamer to play an exhibition game. The match was played on October 12 and saw the Messengers side win 12 to 10. Richmond had finished runners up in the championship to them. For the winning side Daly, Cliffe, Herd, and Shark scored tries with Seagar and Grigg scoring for Richmond, with J. Henderson kicking 2 goals.

=== 1919, Three teams and affiliation with Maritime ===
In 1919 the Post and Telegraph club again fielded three teams in the Fourth, Fifth, and Sixth grades. It was to be their last season as a standalone organisation as in the middle of the season they affiliated with the Maritime Football Club. The Fourth grade team fared best of the 3 sides finishing one point behind City Rovers in second place, tied with Ōtāhuhu Rovers. At the start of their season their team was named and was virtually identical to the side which won the competition the previous season; Manley, Cliff, Sharpe, Dodds, Campbell, Bell, Bennett, Baker, Smith, Tracey, Herd, and Munro. Their Fifth and Sixth grade teams were also very similar to the 1918 teams.

On June 14 the Post and Telegraph Football Club held a meeting in the Auckland Rugby League ‘League Rooms’ during the evening. This was unusual and indicated that there was a serious issue to be discussed. They went so far as to publish an advertisement in the New Zealand Herald. It asked “all members to attend a THIS (SATURDAY) NIGHT, to be held in the League Rooms, 5 Swanson Street, at 7:30 p.m. Business: Urgent and important”, and was sent in by W. Pearce, their honorary secretary. It seems that there was a dispute within the club about who had control over it. Messrs Charles Sinclair (their original secretary and organiser of the club), and W. Pearce travelled to the Auckland Rugby League officers on June 25 to the weekly meeting there. They reportedly “waited on the committee to discuss misunderstandings in connection with the Post and Telegraph Club. One stated that the P. and T. Football Club was, or had until recently been under the control of the P. and T. Social Club and asked the league to recognise that social body; while the other gentleman contended otherwise. The committee decided that the matter was one outside its jurisdiction, as it could recognise only registered and affiliated bodies, but the deputation was advised by Mr. Carlaw as to the course most likely to avert further friction”.

On July 12 all three team lists were published for their July 13 matches. Significantly these were to be their last games as a Telegraph Messengers/Post and Telegraph named club. They made an application to be affiliated with the Maritime Football Club and it was granted at the board meeting on July 17. Interestingly at the start of the 1920 season W. Pearce of the Telegraph club was appointed the honorary secretary of the Maritime club.

=== Appearances in midweek competitions ===
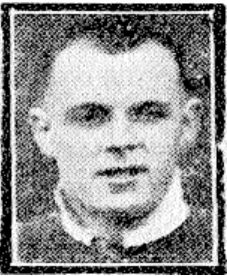
Wally Somers, Post and Telegraph Department player in 1923.

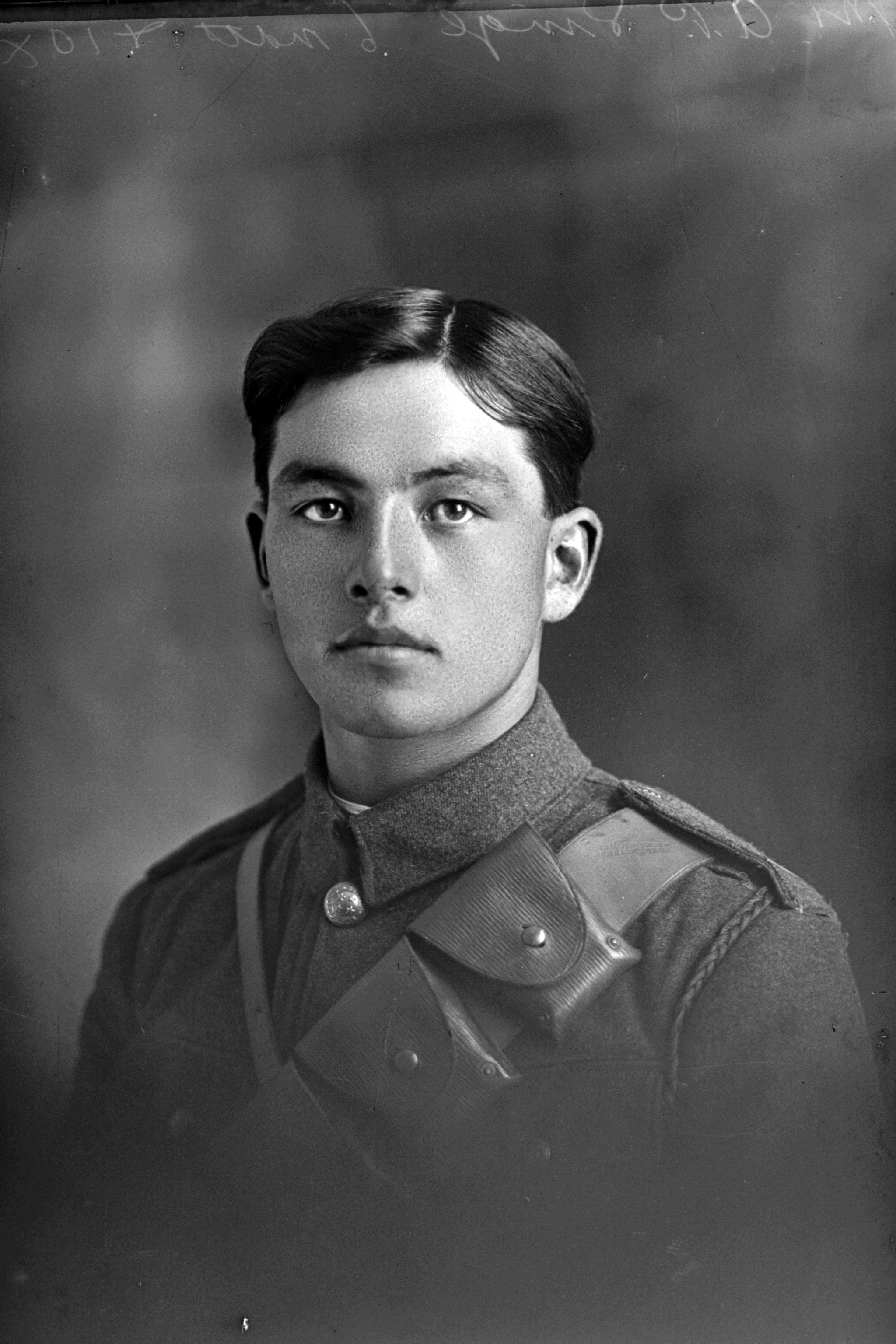
Arthur Singe, Post and Telegraph Department player in 1923.

In 1922 a Post and Telegraph rugby league competition was played midweek in Auckland. They played for the Engineers Cup of the Post and Telegraph Department with matches played on Thursday afternoons at Victoria Park. The teams involved were Postmen, Linesmen, Telegraph, Messengers, Workshops, and Faultmen. Then in 1923 Post and Telegraph entered a side in the Wednesday competition. They won it with 7 wins from 8 games, beating Tramways in the final 16–15. Their side featured the likes of Arthur Singe and Wally Somers. Somers was a New Zealand representative from 1919 to 1928, while Singe played for New Zealand in 1925 and 1926. They both worked for the company. Throughout the same time period there was also a Post and Telegraph Rugby Football Club which played rugby union, and in 1922 they amalgamated with the Technical College Old Boys to become known as United. However, in 1927 the club reverted to the name Technical College Old Boys and in 1950 they moved to Cornwall Park and took on the name Cornwall. In the 1980s they became Carlton Rugby Football Club and in 1996 merged with Grammar, with further mergers following they are now part of the Grammar TEC RC.

The Post and Telegraph Department occasionally fielded rugby league teams into the 1930s before ceasing to do so at some point. In 1929 they played in a one-off match against the Trotting Trainers. The in 1931 they played in the midweek competition at Carlaw Park.

== Records ==
The results are incomplete. The New Zealand Herald and Auckland Star published the fixture list each week with details, but results were only sent to the newspapers sporadically during the season, so these records have been compiled from the known results.

=== Fourth grade ===
Season	Pld	W	D	L	PF	PA	PD	Pts	Position (Teams)
1918	12	8	0	1	102	36	+66	16	1st of 9
1919	9	5	0	4	75	35	+40	10	2nd of 10
Total	21	13	0	5	177	71	+106	26	

=== Fifth grade ===
Season	Pld	W	D	L	PF	PA	PD	Pts	Position (Teams)
1916	11	1	0	7	29	59	-30	2	Approximately 6th of 6
1917	3	1	0	2	21	24	-3	2	Approximately 4th of 6
1918	10	1	0	4	11	82	−71	2	Approximately 8th of 11
1919	5	1	0	4	11	68	-57	2	Approximately 7th of 10
Total	29	4	0	17	72	233	-163	8	

=== Sixth grade ===
Season	Pld	W	D	L	PF	PA	PD	Pts	Position (Teams)
1917	8	1	0	7	26	72	-46	2	Approximately 4th of 4
1918	14	1	0	6	19	106	-87	2	Approximately 6th of 6
1919	7	0	0	7	5	88	-83	0	Approximately 6th of 7
Total	29	2	0	20	133	166	-33	4	
