= Big Store Rugby League Club =

Defunct NZ rugby league club, based in Auckland

The Big Store
Club information
- Full name: Big Store Football Club
- Short name: Big Store
- Colours: Blue and White
- Founded: 1918
- Exited: 1918; 108 years ago

Former details
- Captain: Cowley
- Competition: Auckland Rugby League

The Big Store Rugby League Club was a rugby league club which existed briefly in 1918 and competed in the Auckland Rugby League 5th grade competition. They were based in central Auckland, New Zealand and were made up of employees of the George Court & Sons Department Store.

== History ==
=== 1918 Entry into Auckland Rugby League ===
On April 17, 1918 the Big Store Football Club nominated a single team to play in the Auckland Rugby League 5th grade competition. The league accepted their nomination and also approved of their club colours which would be blue and white. The side was named after the George Court & Sons Department Store on Karangahape Road. The department store’s motto was the “Big Store” due to its “extensive range of goods rather than its actual physical size”. Later in the mid 1920s it was enlarged further and that building still remains on the corner of Karangahape Road and Mercury Lane. In 1988 the store closed and in 1993 it was converted into an apartment building and opened in 1993.

=== Matches ===
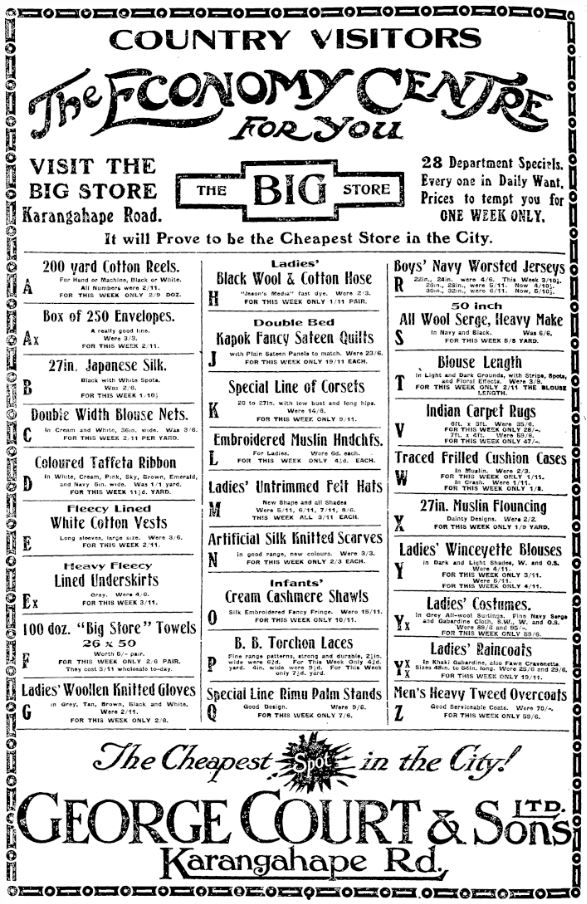
Advertisement for the Karangahape Road "Big Store".

On May 4 Big Store played a practice match with North Shore Albions at Devonport Domain in Devonport at 3pm, with Mr. Aughton refereeing. They lost 6-0 with Emerali and Davies scoring for their opponents.

The season draw was then published with the Big Store in a competition involving 11 sides from Ōtāhuhu Rovers, City Rovers, Richmond Rovers, Ponsonby United (2), Northcote & Birkenhead Ramblers, North Shore Albions, Manukau Rovers (2), and Telegraph Messengers.

They played another practice match against City before their first official competition match against Northcote & Birkenhead Ramblers on May 25 at Victoria Park with Mr. Sherrick the referee. The Big Store’s first ever team named to play was McVeigh, McCready, McIntyre, Newdick, Walker, Smith, Cowley, Montague, Armstrong, Potters, Judge, Beresford, Pringle, Billman. As was the case with many matches from this era the result was not reported, with just 23 reported in the Auckland Star and New Zealand Herald out of 57 played. The Big Store side only had 3 of their 9 matches reported. Their next match was against Telegraph Messengers on June 1 before games with Manukau A (June 8), North Shore (June 29), and Ponsonby B on July 6. On July 20 their match with Ponsonby A did have the score reported with Big Store losing 6-0 at the Auckland Domain.

On July 27 they played Manukau B at Manukau with no score reported. Then in the following round they were well beaten by Richmond Rovers 27-0 at Grey Lynn Park in Grey Lynn.

=== Affiliation with City Rovers and then Newton Rangers ===
In mid season on June 5 Big Store wrote to the league requesting affiliation with the Newton Rangers club. However they had already been granted affiliation with the City Rovers club. The league decided that they would defer their decision until the next meeting on June 12 and in the meantime write to the City and Big Store clubs to gain further information. Both the City and Newton clubs were foundation clubs of the Auckland Rugby League having formed in 1909. At the following meeting the league received City’s response that they had no objection to the Big Store affiliating with Newton. Therefore the league granted the affiliation. The only reported condition was that any City registered players who were playing for Big Store would need to revert back to the City club at the end of the season and not remain with the Big Store side/Newton club.

=== Suspension from competition ===
On August 8 two players were registered to the league to the Big Store club. They were G. Boyle and W. Williamson. Days later they were to play their final ever match due to a mass suspension. Big Store played against Ōtāhuhu at Ōtāhuhu on August 10. Ōtāhuhu won the game 16 points to 0. Following the match the August 14 meeting of the Auckland Rugby League disqualified all members of the Big Store 5th grade team “until the end of season 1919, and Cowley (the captain) was suspended for three years”. There is no record of the club every playing again as a separate entity. It is likely that any registered players remaining returned to play when their suspensions ended for either the City or Newton clubs in the 1920 season. Whilst it was not reported if they ever won a match or scored points it is likely as the 3 teams that they were defeated by finished in the top 4 with their other matches against sides mid table or struggling like Big Store.

== Team record ==
Big Store completed 9 of their scheduled 12 fixtures prior to their suspension. Only 3 of their 9 games had scores reported.

Season	Grade	Name	Played	W	D	L	PF	PA	PD	Pts	Position (Teams)
1918	5th Grade	Big Store	9	0	0	3	0	77	-77	0	10th of 11 (approximately)
