= Ivan Stewart (rugby league) =

New Zealand international rugby league player

Personal information
- Full name: Ivan Angus Stewart
- Born: 28 August 1894 Mangawhai, Northland, New Zealand
- Died: 4 August 1952 (aged 57) Auckland, New Zealand

Playing information
- Height: 5 ft 4 in (1.63 m)
- Weight: 140 lb (64 kg)
- Position: Halfback, Stand-off, Centre
Club
| Years | Team | Pld | T | G | FG | P |
|---|---|---|---|---|---|---|
| 1917 | North Shore Albions | 9 | 1 | 0 | 0 | 3 |
| 1917 | Ponsonby-North Shore | 1 | 1 | 0 | 0 | 3 |
| 1917 | Combined Team (ARL) | 1 | 0 | 0 | 0 | 0 |
| 1918–20 | City Rovers (ARL) | 25 | 2 | 0 | 0 | 6 |
| | Total | 36 | 4 | 0 | 0 | 12 |
Representative
| Years | Team | Pld | T | G | FG | P |
| 1917–20 | Auckland | 3 | 0 | 0 | 0 | 0 |
| 1919 | New Zealand | 7 | 2 | 0 | 0 | 6 |
| 1919 | Auckland Province | 1 | 0 | 0 | 0 | 0 |

Ivan Stewart (1894–1952) played for the New Zealand rugby league team. He was Kiwi number 119 and played one test, against Australia in 1919. He played for the North Shore Albions after returning from the war in 1917, and then for City Rovers in the Auckland Rugby League competition from 1918 to 1920.

== Early life and war ==
Ivan Stewart was born on 28 August 1894. His mother was Elizabeth Margaret Stewart (1863-1952) and his father was Duncan Stewart (1860-1934). He had three sisters; Kitoria Olivette Stewart (1888-1979), Rita Phillis Stewart (1891-1977), and Edna Marion Stewart (1898-?), and two brothers; James Douglas Stewart (1889-1973), and William Oscar Stewart (1893-1966).

Stewart was a very strong swimmer in his teen years, winning many competitions. He enlisted in the New Zealand army and served in World War I. He had been working in Te Puke but was living with his father on Nelson Street in Auckland at the time of enlistment. He fought in Egypt and the Western Front, where he was wounded before returning to New Zealand and being discharged on 2 April 1917.

== Playing career ==
Ivan Stewart played for North Shore Albions in 1917, playing in 9 matches and scoring a try. Towards the end of the season he played in a combined Ponsonby-North Shore side against a combined City-Newton side. Then he played in a combined team from North Shore, City, and Newton clubs against the Ponsonby side. In 1918 he moved to the City Rovers and debuted in a preliminary round game of the 1918 season. He was part of the team who won the Roope Rooster that same season when they defeated Maritime 6–3 in the final at the Auckland Domain in front of 7,000 spectators. He was named in the reserves to play in the Auckland match with Canterbury but did not take the field.

=== New Zealand debut ===
Stewart made his debut for New Zealand on the 1919 tour of Australia. In total he played in 6 of the 11 tour matches. He debuted in the 3rd tour match against Tamworth at halfback alongside the legendary Thomas McClymont. Stewart scored 2 tries in a 21–13 win. These were to be his only points in a New Zealand jersey. He played centre against New South Wales Firsts in a 31–39 loss. And he played there again against the same opponents 2 days later when they again lost 19–22 Stewart moved back to the halves for the match against Ipswich Firsts which New Zealand won 11–8. Stewart played his fourth and fifth successive matches in 13–26, and 13-16 point losses to Queensland

After the tour of Australia (which involved no test matches) the Australian national team toured New Zealand. Stewart was selected to play for New Zealand against Australia at the Auckland Domain in the 4th test of the series. New Zealand trailed the series 1-2 and lost 32–2 in front of 15,000 spectators with Stewart playing halfback. Stewart would get to play the Australian team again this time for the Auckland Province team made up of players from the Auckland club competition and the wider district although this particular team like most other Auckland Provincial teams in this era was totally dominated by Auckland Rugby League club players. Auckland lost 8–32 which then went on to utterly demolish its remaining provincial opponents by well over 50 points.

=== Auckland appearance ===
In 1920 Stewart played for the Auckland team which beat the touring England side 24–16 at the Auckland Domain in front of an enormous crowd estimated at 30,000.

=== Retirement ===
It is unclear if he continued to play in 1921 or beyond as there are no records of him playing rugby league or any other code in New Zealand.

== Personal life and death ==
Ivan Stewart did not marry and had no children. He died on 4 August 1952 in Auckland aged 58. He was buried at Waikumete Cemetery.
