= Arthur Matthews (rugby league) =

New Zealand international rugby league footballer

Personal information
- Full name: Arthur Edwin Matthews
- Born: 28 June 1889 Thames, New Zealand
- Died: February 1951 (aged 61–62) Western Australia, Australia

Playing information
- Position: Fullback, Centre, Halfback
Club
Years	Team	Pld	T	G	FG	P
1911–15	Ponsonby United (ARL)	14	1	0	0	3
1917–19	North Shore Albions	9	1	0	0	3
1918	Ponsonby United	5	2	0	0	6
1919–20	North Shore Albions	11	1	7	0	17
1920	Ponsonby United	1	0	0	0	0
1921	North Shore Albions	1	0	0	0	0
	Total	41	5	7	0	29
Representative
Years	Team	Pld	T	G	FG	P
1919	New Zealand	3	0	1	0	2
1919	Auckland	1	0	0	0	0

Arthur Matthews (1889–1951) played for the New Zealand rugby league team in 1919 on their tour of Australia. He was Kiwi number 117. He played in 3 tour matches but did not play in any tests as there were none played on this tour. He lived in Auckland and played for the Ponsonby United and North Shore Albions senior teams from 1915 to 1920.

== Personal life ==
He was born on 28 June 1889. The son of Louisa and Charles Matthews. He had several siblings. They were Clara Louisa (b.1879), Florence Sarah (b.1881), Charles Bosley (b.1883), NR (b.1885), Eric William (b.1899), and May Elizabeth (b.1892). It appears that he later moved to Australia and died in Western Australia in 1951.

== Playing career ==
Arthur Matthews began his career playing for Ponsonby United in the Auckland Rugby League competition. He played for them from 1911 to 1915 though mostly playing just a handful of games each season. He was an electrician by trade and in 1917 he volunteered for the war effort on 16 March while he was living in Thames. After being physically examined he was declared fit for active duty though he never went away to fight.

He was involved in some controversy early in the 1917 season. He and his brother (William) turned out for the North Shore Albions without having formalised a transfer. Grafton Athletic protested and the Auckland Rugby League stood down both players and stated that the match should be replayed. It was later reported that it was an oversight as W. Matthews had just returned from war service and had played some matches for Ponsonby 3rd grade team years earlier, while the Ponsonby 3rd grade team had withdrawn from the competition due to a lack of playing numbers. As a result, the Ponsonby club had granted both brothers transfers. The transfers were duly processed allowing Arthur Matthews to turn out for North Shore in their second round match against City Rovers.

In 1918 North Shore were forced to withdraw from the senior competition due to a lack of playing numbers. Many sports were struggling at this time because so many of their players had gone away to fight in the First World War. As a result, Matthews transferred back to the Ponsonby club where he played for the remainder of the season. He played for them in their Thacker Shield winning effort where they beat Sydenham in Christchurch 11–0 and scored a try . In 1919 the North Shore team was revived and he returned to them. This was to be the most impressive season of Matthews career.

In May 1919 he played in a trial match to make the New Zealand team. The match was played at Victoria Park and he was listed in the centres. Subsequently, he was selected for the New Zealand team on their 1919 tour of Australia. He was named in the reserves to play for New Zealand in a warm up match against Auckland but did not take the field. Matthews played in 3 of the 11 tour matches, being used in 3 different positions. He debuted for New Zealand against Tamworth on 11 June, playing in the centres. New Zealand won the match 21–13. His next match was against Ipswich Firsts on 26 June, where he played fullback in an 11–8 win. He kicked a goal and this was to be his only points for New Zealand. His third match was against Rockhampton on 9 July. This time he was to play in the halfback position and this was to be the last game he would play for New Zealand. New Zealand would also win this match 23–0.

Unusually Matthews did not represent Auckland until after he had played for New Zealand. Partly this was due to the fact that so few Auckland representative matches were played in previous seasons due to the war. He played for the “Rest of Auckland” team against the touring side on their return. Auckland was to lose 30–45 in front of 6,500 spectators at Victoria Park. This was to be the only time he pulled on the Auckland jersey.

In 1920 he again turned out for the North Shore team but at the end of the season on 8 September he was granted an open transfer by the Auckland Rugby League to play for any club outside the Auckland league district in their weekly meeting. Though it appears that he turned out for Ponsonby in their Roope Rooster semi final loss just days later.

== Bowls and Yachting ==
In 1923 Matthews was the skipper of the Rona yacht which won the Sanders Cup in the Auckland Province. Then in 1932 Matthews won the champion of champions bowls title in Auckland.
