= Bill Cloke =

New Zealand international rugby league footballer (1892-1956)

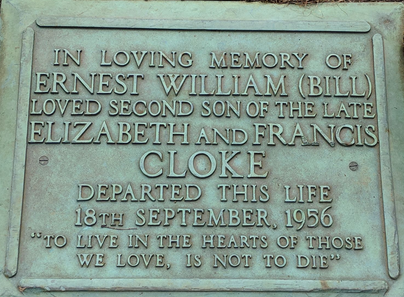
- Ernest Cloke's gravestone

Personal information
- Full name: Ernest William Cloke
- Born: 9 April 1892 New Zealand
- Died: 18 September 1956 (aged 64)

Playing information
- Position: Wing
Club
Years	Team	Pld	T	G	FG	P
1916–17	Otahuhu United	13	0	0	0	0
1917–23	Newton Rangers	55	13	1	0	41
	Total	68	13	1	0	41
Representative
Years	Team	Pld	T	G	FG	P
1920	Auckland	2	4	1	0	14
1919	New Zealand	6	4	0	0	12

Ernest William "Bill" Cloke was a New Zealand rugby league player who represented New Zealand.

== Playing career ==
Bill Cloke began his career playing for Otahuhu United in 1916 playing 11 matches for their senior side. He played 2 further matches for them in the 1917 season before he transferred to the Newton Rangers after the Otahuhu senior side folded mid season due to a lack of players through illness, injury, and players leaving for the war effort. Cloke played for New Zealand on the 1919 tour of Australia, where no test matches were played.

On 24 July 1920 he played for Auckland against the touring Great Britain Lions. They won 24–16, becoming the first New Zealand team to defeat Great Britain on New Zealand soil.

== Selector ==
Cloke later became a selector for Auckland in the 1940s.
