= Bill Stormont =

NZ international rugby league player (1898-1925)

William Stormont
Personal information
- Full name: William Devanney Stormont
- Born: 25 August 1898 Birmingham, England
- Died: 4 June 1925 (aged 26) Auckland, New Zealand

Playing information
- Height: 5 ft 10 in (1.78 m) (aged 18)
- Weight: 11 st 0 lb (70 kg) (aged 18)
- Position: Prop
Club
Years	Team	Pld	T	G	FG	P
1920–24	Marist	54	23	37	0	147
Representative
Years	Team	Pld	T	G	FG	P
1920–24	Auckland	16	4	2	0	16
1920	New Zealand	3	0	0	0	0

William Stormont (25 August 1898 – 4 June 1925) was a New Zealand rugby league player who represented New Zealand. His parents were John Stormont (1 Aug 1863 – 23 September 1936), a pastry chef and baker, and Annie Stormont nee Brownlie (7 July 1871 – 7 Dec 1944).

== Playing career ==
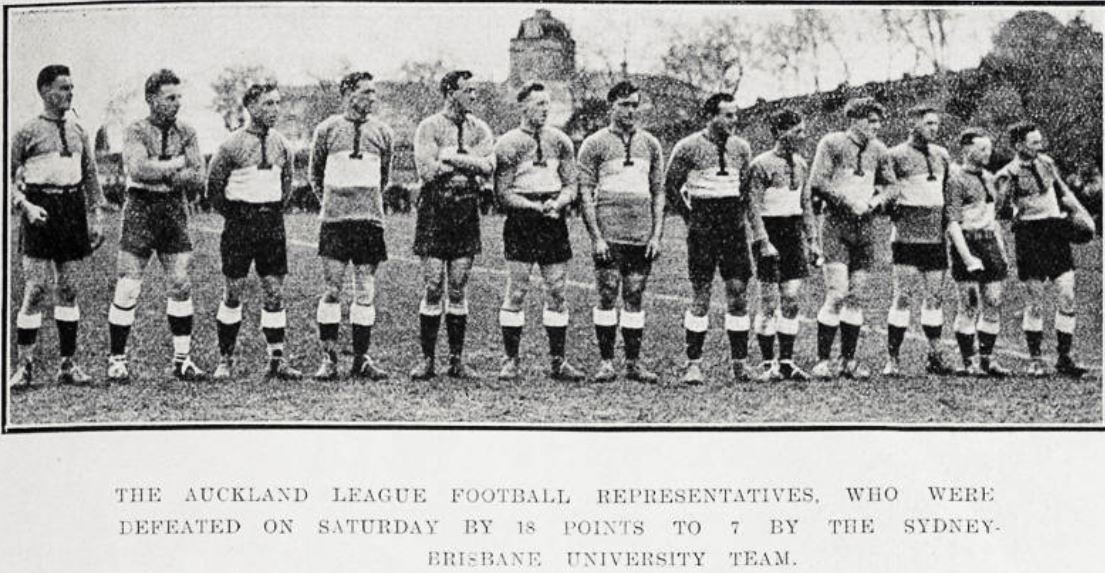
Stormont 4th from the right in the Auckland team to play the 2nd match against the Australian Universities side at the Auckland Domain on 24 June 1922.

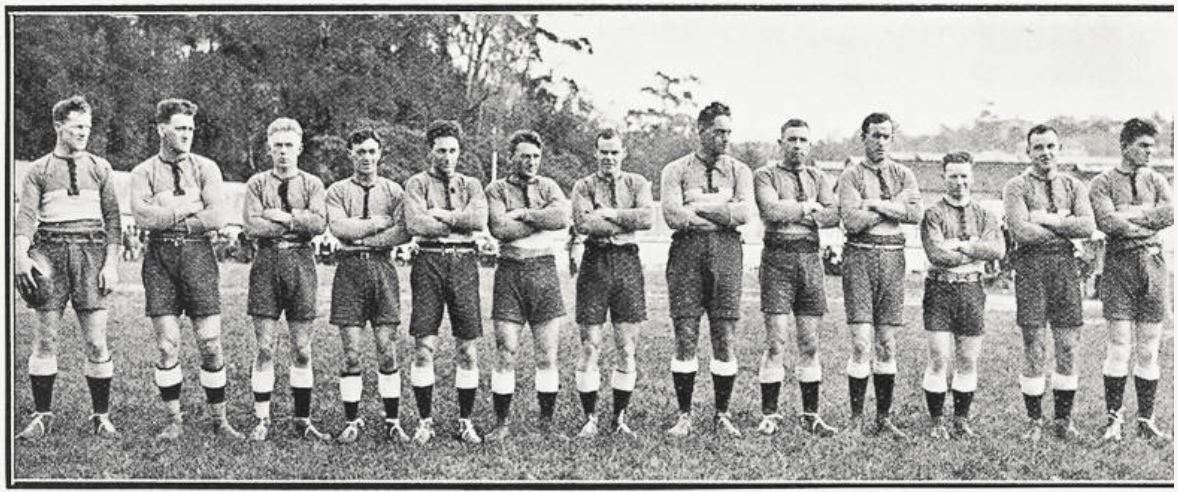
Stormont on the right in the Auckland team to play England at Carlaw Park in 1924.

Stormont played for Marist in the Auckland Rugby League competition. He represented Auckland and was first selected for the New Zealand national rugby league team in 1920 following Aucklands 24-16 win over the touring English team. Stormont was the first member of the Marist club to be selected for the Kiwis. He played in all 3 tests in the #10 prop position against the touring England team in 1920. New Zealand lost the 3 matches 7-31 at the Auckland Domain, 3-19 at Lancaster Park, and 10-11 at the Basin Reserve. Film of Stormont playing for Auckland against the 1924 touring English team can be seen at the Ngā Taonga Sound and vision archive.

== Military career ==
Stormont enlisted in the New Zealand Defence Force on 11 May 1917 aged 18 using a false birthdate (25/4/1897). At the time, recruits were required to be 19 to be posted overseas. He was meant to travel on ship 93, the Corinthic, but was AWOL at departure. His war record contains details of his court marshal and disciplinary record. He retrained as a Machine Gunner and travelled to the United Kingdom on 31 December 1917 on ship 99, the Athenic. He was hospitalized on arrival with Influenza for 5 days in early April 1918 and did not travel to France until June 1918. His war record also lists hospitalization for bunions in December 1918.

== Later Years and Death ==
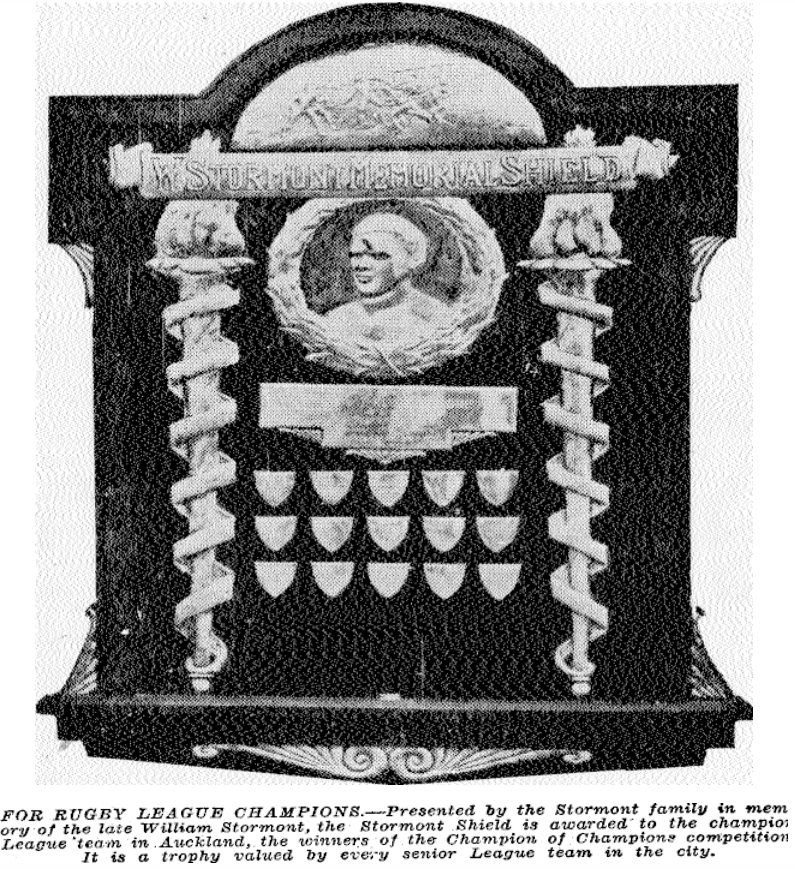

He returned to play rugby league for Marist in 1920, later becoming the club captain. Stormont died from rheumatic heart disease on 4 June 1925 after a long battle with illness aged 26. The William Stormont Memorial Shield was presented to the Auckland Rugby League by the Stormont family. That same year, Ponsonby defeated City 35-3 to become the first holder of the Stormont Shield.
