= William Wynyard (rugby) =

NZ international rugby league footballer (1882-1932)

Billy Wynyard
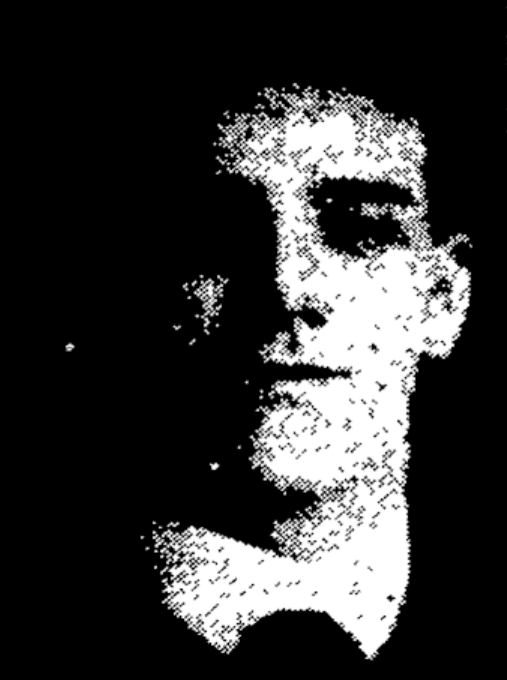

Personal information
- Full name: William Thomas Wynyard
- Born: 13 September 1882 Auckland, New Zealand
- Died: 21 August 1932 (aged 49) Devonport, Auckland, New Zealand

Playing information
- Height: 5 ft 9 in (1.75 m)
- Weight: 11 st 3 lb (71 kg)

Rugby union
- Position: Centre
Club
Years	Team	Pld	T	G	FG	P
1900	North Shore	9	0	0	0	0
Representative
Years	Team	Pld	T	G	FG	P
1907	Auckland	1	1	0	0	3

Rugby league
- Position: Wing, Centre
Club
Years	Team	Pld	T	G	FG	P
1909–13	North Shore	7	2	0	0	6
Representative
Years	Team	Pld	T	G	FG	P
1907–08	New Zealand	15 (2)	4	0	0	12
1908–10	Auckland	4	1	0	0	3
- Relatives: Richard Wynyard (brother); Tabby Wynyard (uncle)

William Thomas Wynyard (13 September 1882 – 21 August 1932) was a New Zealand rugby football player who was part of the professional rugby league 1907–08 New Zealand rugby tour of Australia and Great Britain.

== Background ==
He was the brother of Richard Wynyard. He was born and died in Auckland.

== Early years ==
Wynyard was from a sporting family that included three uncles that were part of the 1888–89 New Zealand Native football team that conducted a rugby union tour of Great Britain. One of these three, Tabby Wynyard, went on to represent New Zealand on their 1893 tour of Australia. Richard followed the family tradition, becoming a noted rugby player and a civil servant clerk by trade.

== Rugby football career ==
Living in Devonport, Wynyard was part of the North Shore Rugby Club. He went in the 10th New Zealand contingent to the Boer War, and played rugby there.

He won Auckland selection later than his brother Richard did, but by 1907 was firmly established in the Auckland side.

== Rugby league career ==
Wynyard was selected to be part of the professional All Blacks 1907–08 tour of Australia and Great Britain. He was one of the last two players selected, along with Charlie Dunning, and joined the squad late during the first Australian leg of the tour. Wynyard became a valuable member of the squad, scoring six tries, however injury meant he had to wait until the squad returned to Australia to make his test debut, playing in the first ever trans-Tasman test which was the debut match of the Australia national rugby league team. He played in two of the test matches against Australia.

Unlike many of the touring party Wynyard opted not to return to a professional contract in Britain and instead stayed in New Zealand to help establish rugby league. He, along with his brother, helped found the North Shore Albions Rugby League Club – which broke away from the North Shore Rugby Club. He largely acted as a coach and selector for the North Shore club though he did come out of retirement to play a match for them in Round 7 of the 1913 season and scored a try in a 10–7 win.

== Later years ==
When the New Zealand Rugby League was formed on 25 April 1910 Wynyard was elected to the New Zealand Council. He served as a New Zealand selector between 1910 and 1919. He was also an active member of the North Shore Rowing Club and was a founder of the Devonport Orphans' Club. For 34 years he was connected with the firm of P/ Hayman and Sons, Ltd.

Wynyard later became the President of the New Zealand Rugby League and was made the organisations first life member.

He died at his home at 22 May Street, Devonport, Auckland leaving behind a wife, 4 daughters and 2 sons.
