= Wally Somers =

New Zealand international rugby league footballer (1899–1980)

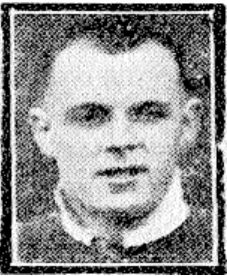

Personal information
- Full name: Walter Thomas Somers
- Born: 14 June 1899 Auckland, New Zealand
- Died: 11 September 1980 (aged 81) Auckland, New Zealand

Playing information
- Position: Hooker
Club
Years	Team	Pld	T	G	FG	P
1917–29	Newton Rangers	128	35	5	0	115
1917	City/Newton (exhibition)	1	0	0	0	0
1922	Post and Telegraph	1	1	0	0	3
1930	Ellerslie United	11	3	2	0	13
1931	Ellerslie United-Otahuhu Rovers	3	0	0	0	0
	Total	144	39	7	0	131
Representative
Years	Team	Pld	T	G	FG	P
1920–28	Auckland	25	8	3	0	30
1919–28	New Zealand	18 (6)	10	0	0	30
1922	Australasia	1	0	2	0	4
1923	Auckland Province	1	0	0	0	0
1927–28	North Island	2	0	0	0	0

Walter Thomas "Wally" Somers was a New Zealand rugby league player who represented New Zealand.

== Early life ==
Walter Thomas Somers was born on 14 June 1899. He was the son of Amy Maria (Lawrence) and Daniel Somers. He had two sisters, Eileen Elizabeth Findlay (1896-1979) and Zelda Nina Goffin (1898-1966), and one brother Daniel Robert Lawrence Somers (1894-1944).

== Playing career ==
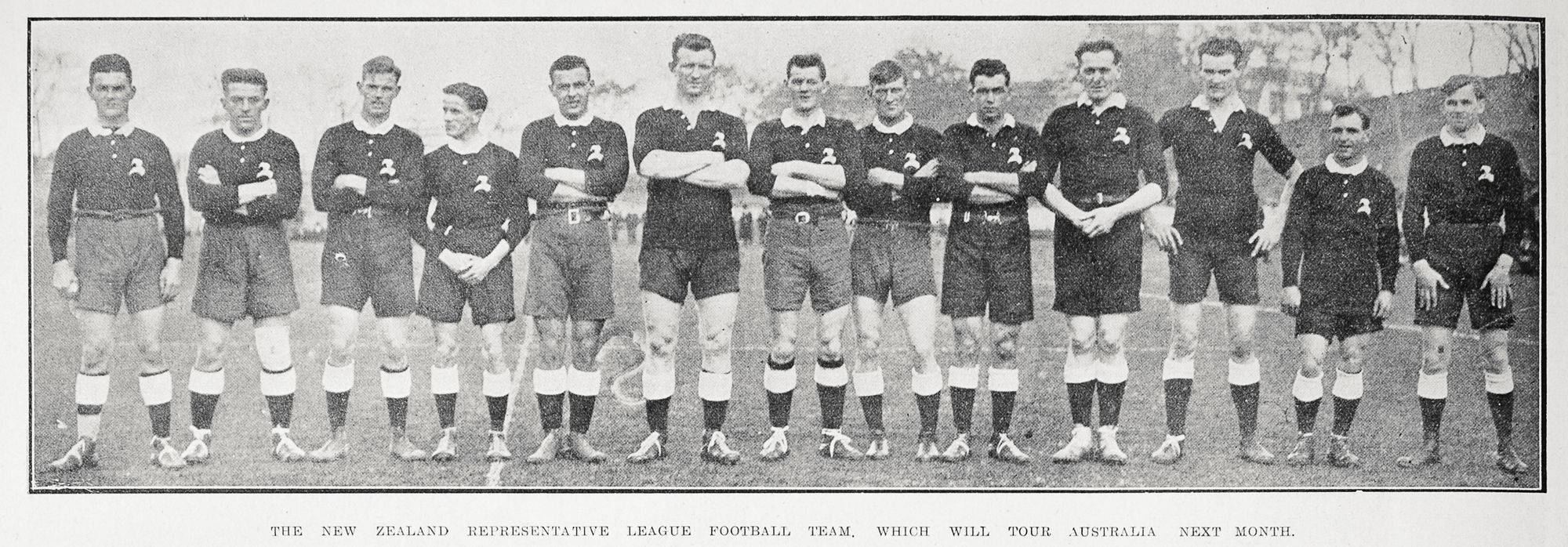
Somers 5th from the left in the 'New Zealand' team to play Auckland on 21 May 1921.

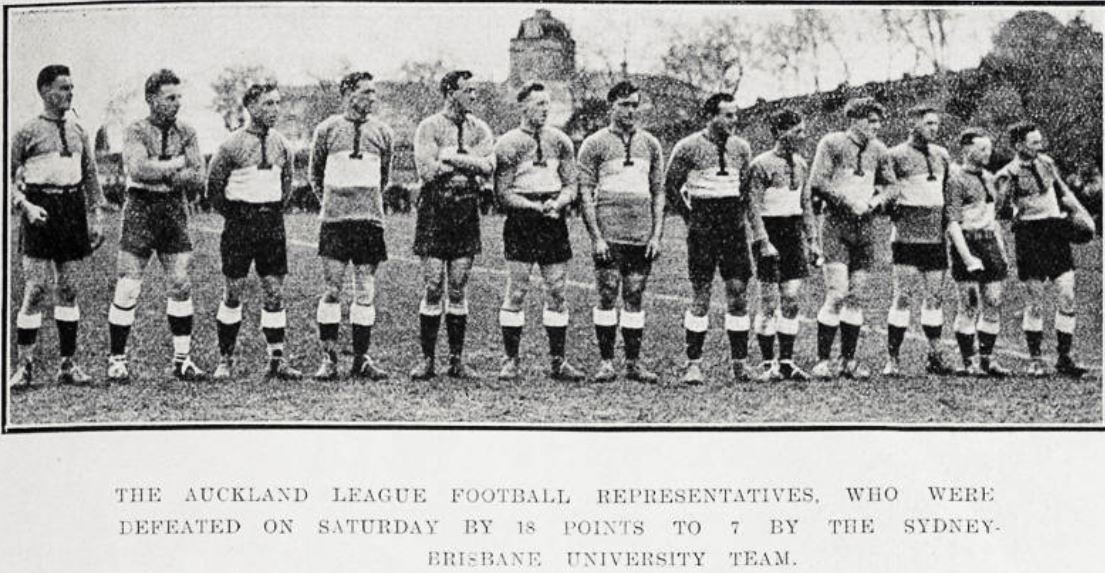
Somers 6th from the right in the Auckland team to play the 2nd match against the Australian Universities side at the Auckland Domain on 24 June 1922.

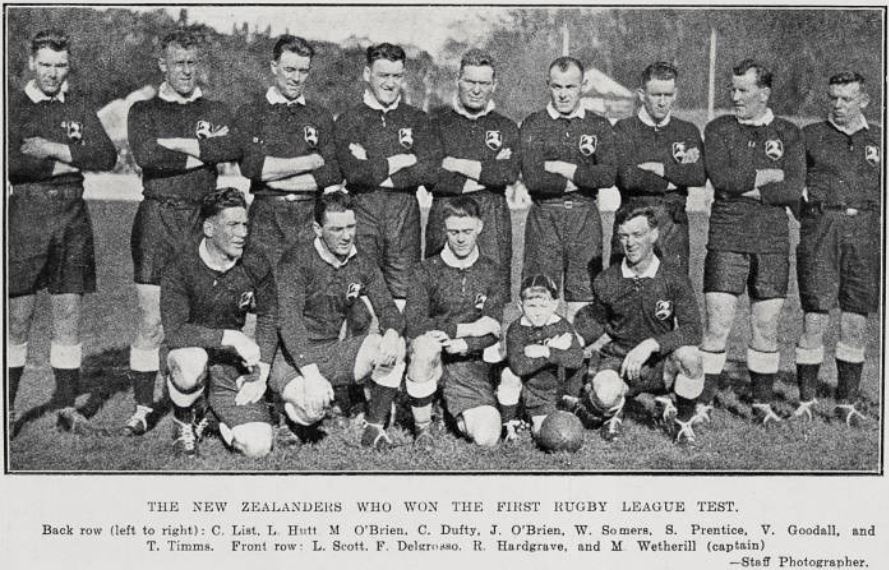
The NZ 1st test team to play England at Carlaw Park on 4 Aug 1928.

Somers played for Newton Rangers in the Auckland Rugby League competition and appeared in a remarkable, for the era, 138 games for them from 1917 to 1929. Early in the 1929 season, he and Craddock Dufty were frustrated with the selection of the Newton team and Somers decided to retire.

The following season in 1930 both he and Dufty joined the Ellerslie United club where Somers played 11 matches scoring 3 tries and kicking a conversion and a penalty before retiring for the final time.

Somers represented Auckland and was first selected to play for New Zealand in 1919 on their tour of Australia where he played 6 matches.

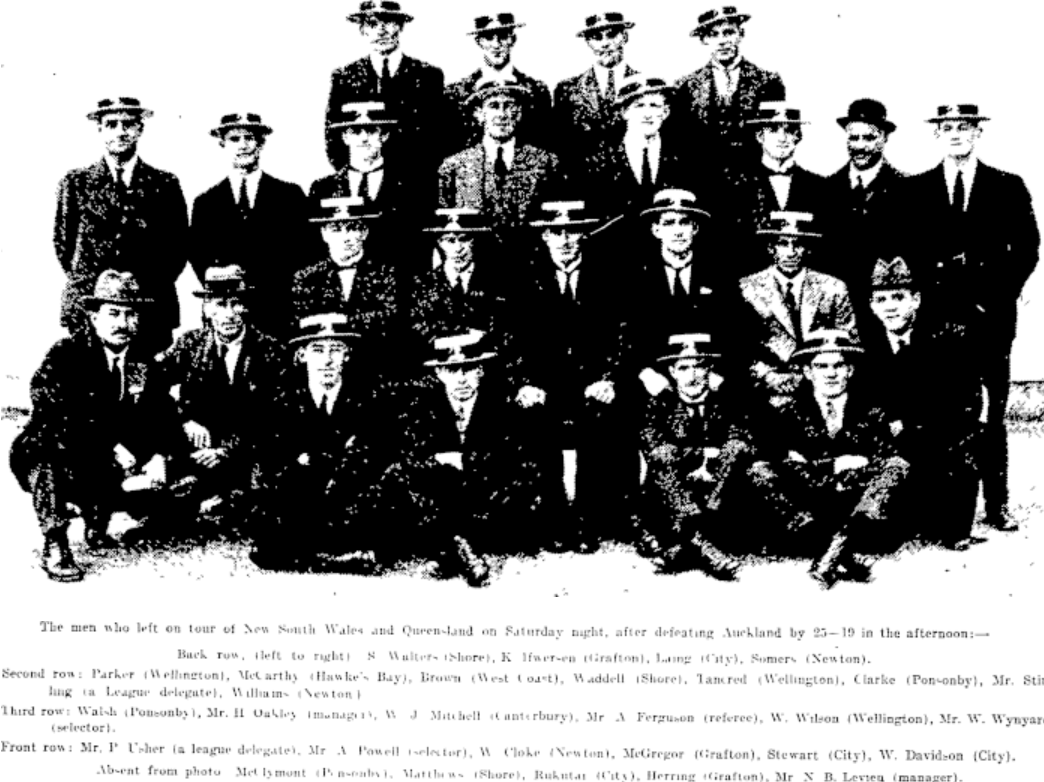
The 1919 New Zealand team to tour New South Wales and Queensland. Wally Somers is in the back row on the right.

He then made his test debut against the touring Australian side on 13 September of the same year in a 32–2 loss at the Auckland Domain before a crowd of 15,000.

In 1920, he was part of the Auckland team that defeated Great Britain. They were the first New Zealand team to defeat Great Britain on New Zealand soil.

He also played 3 tests against England on the same tour. He was again selected for the New Zealand side to tour Australia in 1921 where he played 6 tour matches and scored 10 tries.

In 1922, the New South Wales side toured and in the final match of the tour an "Australasian" team was selected featuring 7 New Zealand players and 6 Australian players to represent the Australasian side. Somers was among those chosen and he kicked 2 goals though was sent off along with O'Connor from the New South Wales team. Somers side were soundly beaten 65-27 before a crowd of 12,000 at the Auckland Domain.

It would be 7 years before he again pulled on the New Zealand jersey when he played 2 tests against the touring England side including a 17–13 win in the first test at Carlaw Park before a massive crowd of 28,000.

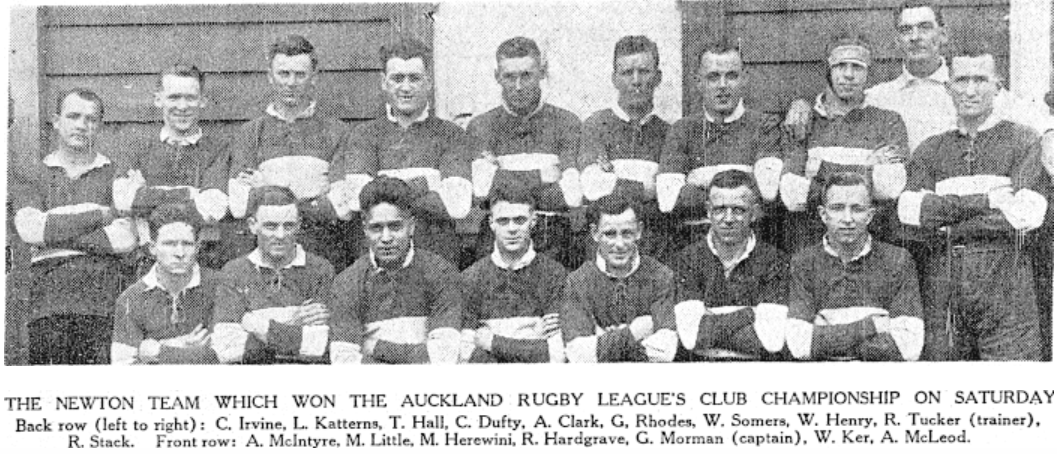
Somers third player from the right in the back row of the champion Newton side of 1927

== Personal life ==
On 18 February 1925, he married Annie Josephine Ogden. They had three sons, Wallace Edward Somers (1925-2001), Richard Arthur Somers (1926-1970), and Robert Graham Somers (1927-1998).

Wally Somers died on 11 September 1980, aged 81.
