= Thomas McClymont =

New Zealand rugby league coach and international rugby league footballer

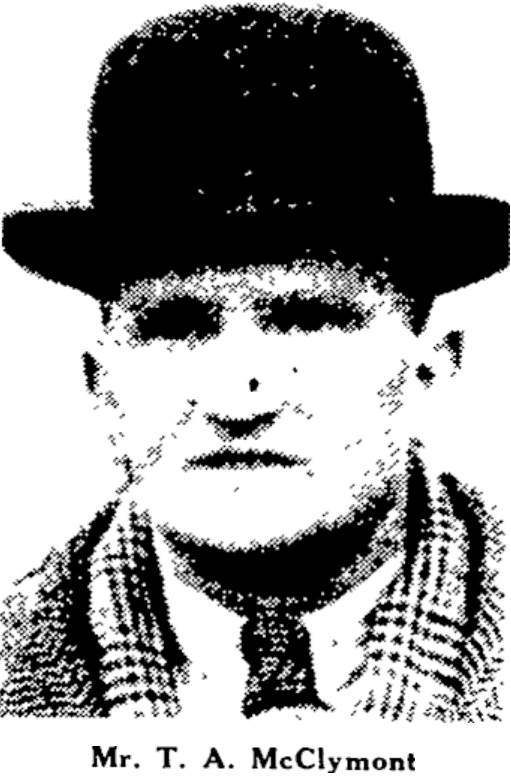

Personal information
- Full name: Thomas Allen McClymont
- Born: 5 January 1892 Karangahake, New Zealand
- Died: 18 December 1974 (aged 82)

Playing information
- Height: 5 ft 6 in (1.68 m)
- Weight: 57 kg (9 st 0 lb)
- Position: Fullback, Centre, Stand-off, Halfback
Club
Years	Team	Pld	T	G	FG	P
1913–24	Ponsonby United	110	29	62	0	211
1917	Ponsonby-North Shore (exhibition)	1	2	0	0	6
	Total	111	31	62	0	217
Representative
Years	Team	Pld	T	G	FG	P
1913–22	Auckland	17	7	5	0	31
1919–24	New Zealand	16	4	3	0	18
1924	Auckland Province	1	0	0	0	0

Coaching information
Club
Years	Team	Gms	W	D	L	W%
1927	Ponsonby United	16	10	1	5	63
1933–1938	Richmond	121	78	6	37	64
1945	Richmond	20	15	0	5	75
	Total	157	103	7	47	66
Representative
Years	Team	Gms	W	D	L	W%
1928	New Zealand	3	1	0	2	33
1929	Canterbury	1	0	0	1	0
1934-35	Auckland	6	5	0	1	83
1936–52	New Zealand	13	6	1	6	46
1958	Northern Districts (ARL)

Thomas Allen "Scotty" McClymont (5 January 1892 – 18 December 1974) was a New Zealand rugby league footballer who played in the 1910s and 1920s, and coached in the 1920s through to the 1950s. He represented New Zealand.

== Early years ==
Thomas McClymont was born in Karangahake. McClymont represented the Goldfields sub-union in rugby union.

== Playing career ==
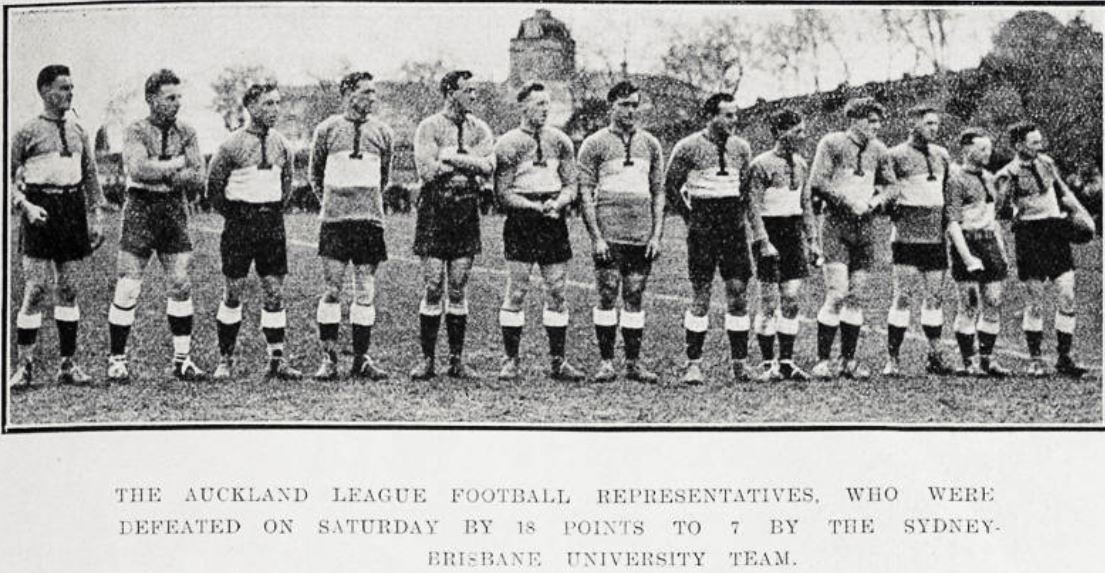
McClymont on the right with the ball, captaining the Auckland team to play the 2nd match against the Australian Universities side at the Auckland Domain on June 24, 1922.

McClymont played for Ponsonby United in the Auckland Rugby League competition, making his debut in 1913, and represented Auckland. He was to be selected at fullback for New Zealand for the 1914 Test against Great Britain; however an injury delayed his debut until after the War.

McClymont was selected as Ponsonby captain in 1919. In 1919 he was selected for the New Zealand team, and played in four Test matches for them between 1919 and 1924. McClymont captained New Zealand in the first Test match against Great Britain in 1924. Unfortunately a broken arm in this match hastened his retirement.

== Coaching career ==
In 1928 McClymont coached New Zealand for a three-match Test series against Great Britain. New Zealand lost 1–2. During the 1930s, McClymont coached Richmond in the Auckland Rugby League competition while remaining a New Zealand selector.

McClymont again became coach in 1936 for two tests against England and two further tests against Australia in 1937. He was named as one of the three selectors for the New Zealand team to tour England and France in 1939. He retained the role after World War II, coaching the Kiwis between 1947 and 1952. During this time he led a tour of Australia in 1939 and two tours of Great Britain and France, in 1947-48 and 1951–52. In 1958 McClymont coached the Northern Districts side in the ARL Competition. Districts were a combination of the North Shore and Northcote teams.

McClymont died in 1974 and was buried at Purewa Cemetery in Auckland. He was inducted as a New Zealand Rugby League Legend of League in 2007.
