= 1914 Auckland Rugby League season =

The 1914 season was the sixth season of Auckland Rugby League since its formation in 1909. It followed the 1913 Auckland Rugby League season where North Shore Albions were crowned senior champions for the first time. The senior grade saw the addition of Otahuhu Rovers, who had previously competed in the lower grades only, and Grafton Athletic. The Manukau Rovers and Eden Ramblers no longer contributed teams. The first grade was won once again by North Shore Albions.

Preceded by 1913	6th Auckland Rugby League season 1914	Succeeded by 1915

At a meeting of Auckland Rugby League on 9 May it was decided that the proceeds of ticket sales at club games would be split 50–50 between the teams and Auckland Rugby League. Interest in the competition continued to grow with 5,000 attending the 3 senior matches played at Victoria Park on 20 June. There were 3,000 in attendance at the North Shore Albions game versus City Rovers in the Round 8 clash at the Devonport Domain. While 4,000 attended the Round 9 match between City Rovers and Ponsonby United at Victoria Park. There were 7,000 spectators for the final between North Shore Albions and Ponsonby United.

Whilst attendances were spectacular at times there were still signs that the competition was in its infancy with teams often playing one or more men short. The worst case being in the Round 9 match where Newton Rangers could only field eight players, with two spectators from the crowd later joining them as they were defeated by 43 points to 2 by North Shore Albions.

Near the conclusion of the season a match was played at Victoria Park between a team of veterans and Auckland colts on 29 August. It raised £27 and 10 shillings for the Patriotic Fund. Also a "Patriotic Carnival" was held on 5 September. A fancy dress carnival paraded around town with Highland pipers and a brass band. It proceeded to the Auckland Domain where a 3rd grade match was being played between Remuera and Ponsonby United 3rd Grade teams, and a ‘Burlesque’ football game was then played. Finally a match was played between the North Island Jockeys and Newton 3rd grade team which the jockey's won 11–6. £49 was raised for the Patriotic Fund.

== Season news ==
=== Club teams by grade participation ===
Team	1st Grade	2nd Grade	3rd Grade	4th Grade	Total
Otahuhu Rovers	1	1	1	2	5
North Shore Albions	1	1	1	1	4
Ponsonby United	1	1	1	1	4
City Rovers	1	1	1	1	4
Newton Rangers	1	1	1	1	4
Grafton Athletic	1	1	0	2	4
Manukau	0	0	1	2	3
Sunnyside	0	0	2	1	3
Remuera United	0	0	1	1	2
Northcote & Birkenhead Ramblers	0	1	0	0	1
Total	6	7	10	12	35

=== Lower grade clubs ===
Teams which fielded sides in lower grades were the Northcote Ramblers, Hobsonville Pirates, Sunnyside (based in Devonport), Remuera United and Manukau. The Sunnyside and Remuera United clubs were both new. The Sunnyside club would later amalgamate with North Shore Albions and form the Devonport United club, which later reverted to the North Shore Albions name. While Remuera fielded sides in 1914 and 1915 before the war wrecked their playing ranks. They reformed again in 1927 but only lasted until the end of the 1929 season.

=== Representative season ===
The Auckland representative campaign got underway with a match versus the touring England team where the home side lost. However the Auckland Rugby League made over £500 from the 13,000 in attendance. They also received £200 in gate takings from the match with Wellington at Victoria Park.

== Myers Cup championship ==
After three weeks of practice in inclement weather the competition commenced on 16 May.

=== Statistics ===
Including the knockout games there were 28 first grade games played with 109 tries, 39 conversions, 59 penalties, 3 drop goals, and 3 goals from a mark. The average number of points per game was 19.1, with 3.9 tries per game. With 39 conversions from 109 attempts the successful percentage was 35.8. These were decreases on the previous season where 22 points had been scored per game and the conversion percentage was 49 versus the current season of 39.

=== Myers Cup standings ===
The standings include the final between North Shore and Ponsonby won by North Shore by 13 points to 2.

Team	Pld	W	D	L	F	A	Pts
North Shore Albions	10	8	1	1	135	38	17
Ponsonby United	10	7	1	2	102	58	15
City Rovers	9	5	0	4	108	65	10
Grafton Athletic	9	3	0	6	75	115	6
Newton Rangers	9	2	1	6	55	148	5
Otahuhu	9	1	1	7	64	115	3

=== Myers Cup fixtures ===
==== Round 1 ====
Otahuhu's beginning to senior rugby league got off to an inauspicious start when they began their match with just nine players. At halftime they were brought up to a full thirteen when substitutes arrived. Percy Williams who had previously represented Auckland at rugby union before being signed by Wigan where he played from 1910 to 1913 had returned to Auckland. He had played for New Zealand on their tour of Australia as a late addition mid tour. He turned out for the City Rovers and played his debut match against Otahuhu. Bill Walsh debuted for Ponsonby but broke a bone in his foot. For Grafton, Alan Douglas Gibbs Dawson debuted for them at fullback. He had been a successful athlete at Auckland Grammar School and a member of the College Rifles rugby club before switching to rugby league. He played 4 matches for Grafton during the year and in 1915 enlisted in the war. He was killed on April 25 (ANZAC DAY), 1915 at Gallipoli.

16 May	North Shore	3–3	Ponsonby	North Shore
3:00	Try: Stan Walters		Try: Thomas McClymont	Referee: Archie Ferguson

16 May	Newton	12–9	Grafton	Victoria Park
3:00	Try: Joe Bennett, Cross; Con: R Clark; Pen: Len Farrant, Ike Healey		Try: Karl Ifwersen; Con: Karl Ifwersen; Pen: Karl Ifwersen 2	Referee: Dick Benson

16 May	Otahuhu	5–25	City	Otahuhu
3:00	Try: Arthur Hardgrave; Pen: George Cook		Try: G Rogers 3, Albert Asher, G Warner, unknown x 2 Con: Ernie Asher, G Warner	Referee: Tom Fielding

==== Round 2 ====
After the injury to Bill Walsh, the New Zealand international, Charles Webb, was called back in to service in his old position at halfback for Ponsonby. He had been a spectator in round 1. Bizarrely Len Farrant kicked 3 goals for City against his own Newton side that he played for in the week prior and would play for again later in the season. There was nothing around a transfer or transfer request in the newspapers.

23 May	North Shore	14–4	Grafton	North Shore
3:00	Try: Hec Wynyard, Stan Weston, Ernie Bailey, Stan Walters; Con: George Seagar		Pen: Karl Ifwersen 2	Referee: Dick Benson

23 May	City	16–0	Newton	Victoria Park
3:00	Try: G Rogers, Harold Denize; Con: Len Farrant 2 Pen: Ernie Asher, Len Farrant, Don Kenealy			Referee: Archie Ferguson

23 May	Otahuhu	4–13	Ponsonby	Otahuhu 1
3:00	Pen: Arthur Hardgrave 2		Try: Charles Webb, Pipseale, unknown x 1 Pen: Charles Webb, Charles Savory	Referee: John Eddowes

==== Round 3 ====
Edward Fox scored a try on full time to win the game for North Shore over City 8–6 at the Auckland Domain. Sixteen years later the premier club trophy in Auckland would be named after him. Ernie Asher scored all of City's points through kicks at goal. It was noted in the Auckland Star that Asher had been jeered when he took shots for goal by sections of the crowd which numbered in the thousands and which also encroached on the field several times. Towards the end of the match after Fox's try the crowd were inciting the players and rough play resulted with two players sent off. The newspaper reports had brought up the lack of any fencing being an issue at these matches which were drawing large crowds at the Domain and Victoria Park each week. The two players ordered off and another from another senior match were not named and were let off with warnings.

30 May	North Shore	8-6	City	Auckland Domain
3:00	Try: Jim Griffin, Edward Fox; Con: Jack Paul		Pen: Ernie Asher 2 Drop: Ernie Asher	Attendance: 2500; Referee: Archie Ferguson

30 May	Ponsonby	19–5	Grafton	Victoria Park
3:00	Try: Charles Savory 2, A Cross, Frank McWhirter, D Corby; Pen: Charles Webb, A Cross		Try: Austin; Pen: Karl Ifwersen	Referee: Tom Fielding

30 May	Otahuhu	10–10	Newton	Otahuhu
3:00	Try: George Cook 2 Con: George Cook; Pen: George Cook		Try: Charles Brockliss, Adelbert Tobin; Con: Adelbert Tobin 2	Referee: F Tyson

==== Round 4 ====
The City v Ponsonby game was notable for the constant penalties awarded by referee Dick Benson. The Auckland Star reported apologised in their piece for the "monotony" of their report. There were 8 penalty goals kicked and numerous other attempts missed along with several shots for goal from marks. In the end the two tries City scored were the difference over Ponsonby's one, winning 16–13. Grafton secured their first ever senior grade win, with Karl Ifwersen scoring all of their 12 points from 2 tries, 2 conversions and a penalty. The league was providing an official matchday program for sale at the games for three pence, however it was complained that the players were taking the field without numbers making the team lists near useless. Cecil Louis Walker debuted for Grafton, playing in the forwards. He played 6 matches for them through the season and enlisted in the war effort. He was killed in action at the Somme, France on 16 September 1916 aged 28.

6 June	City	16–13	Ponsonby	Victoria Park
3:00	Try: Harold Denize, Frederick Mansell; Con: Ernie Asher; Pen: Ernie Asher 3 (and 1 mark)		Try: Charles Savory; Con: Charles Savory; Pen: Charles Savory 2, Charles Webb 2	Attendance: 2000; Referee: Dick Benson

6 June	North Shore	18–0	Newton	Devonport Domain
3:00	Try: George Seagar 2, Stan Walters, Percy Pullen; Con: Stan Walters, Percy Pullen; Drop: Jack Paul			Referee: Tom Fielding

6 June	Grafton	12–10	Otahuhu	Auckland Domain
3:00	Try: Karl Ifwersen 2 Con: Karl Ifwersen 2 Pen: Karl Ifwersen		Try: Charles Hally, George Cook; Con: J Stockman; Pen: unknown x 1	Referee: Archie Ferguson

==== Round 5 ====
In the match between Grafton and City both Albert Asher (City) and Bob Mitchell (Grafton) were ordered off midway through the second half. William Ernest Fincham, a former Taranaki league representative scored a try for Grafton. He had played for Taranaki against Auckland in 1911. It was after referee William Wynyard had awarded Fincham's try that he saw the two players (Albert Asher and Bob Mitchell) "strangling each other". Mitchell was a former City player. At the time the crowd was also said to be "completely out of control". Both players denied doing anything wrong though Mitchell had suggested that it was apparent throughout the match that his former teammates were out for him. Both players were severely cautioned during the following week. Sam Lowrie scored his first ever try for Ponsonby. He had been named in their squads for several weeks but it was the first confirmation that he had actually taken the field. He would go on to play for New Zealand and be one of New Zealand's outstanding hookers in its early decades. His grand nephew was Jason Lowrie who also represented New Zealand.

13 June	Grafton	14–10	City	Victoria Park
3:00	Try: Karl Ifwersen, William Fincham; Con: Karl Ifwersen; Pen: Karl Ifwersen 3		Try: Charles Woolley, G Warner; Con: Ernie Asher 2	Referee: William Wynyard

13 June	Ponsonby	17–3	Newton	Auckland Domain
3:00	Try: D Corby, Sam Lowrie, Charles Webb; Con: Charles Webb; Pen: A Cross, Charles Webb 2		Try: Bob Biggs	Referee: Frank Tyson

13 June	Otahuhu	5–15	North Shore	Otahuhu
3:00	Try: George Cook; Pen: Arthur Hardgrave		Try: Percy Pullen 2, W McDonald; Con: George Seagar 3	Referee: John Eddowes

==== Round 6 ====
Karl Ifwersen received an injury to his jaw the previous week but played in round 6 only to injure the area again. A trip to the doctor revealed that it had been dislocated. A crowd of 5,000 packed into Victoria Park to see the matches. It was a charge day for the Auckland rugby league and they made an estimated 100 pounds. The fields were also fenced which kept the spectators off the field for the first time in many weeks.

20 June	Ponsonby	2–0	North Shore	Victoria Park 1
3:00	Pen: A Cross			Attendance: 5000; Referee: Archie Ferguson

20 June	Newton	15–4	Grafton	Victoria Park 2
3:00	Try: R Rope 2, J Allen, Joe Bennett, Cross		Pen: Karl Ifwersen 2	Attendance: 5000; Referee: Tom Fielding

20 June	City	5–3	Otahuhu	Victoria Park 3
3:00	Try: G Rogers; Pen: G Warner		Try: George Cook	Attendance: 5,000; Referee: Leonard Nield

==== Round 7 ====
George Gillett was granted a transfer from the Newton Rangers (where he was a life member) to the Ponsonby United club. The transfer needed the casting vote of the chairman before it was confirmed. He debuted for Ponsonby in their match with Otahuhu. Charles James Hally scored for Otahuhu in their 13–9 loss to Ponsonby. He enlisted in the war effort the following year and was killed at Gallipoli on July 26, 1915. Barnard Longbottom scored for Ponsonby. He would go on to become a prominent official for Ponsonby and Auckland Rugby League throughout the 1910s, 20s, and 30s.

27 June	Ponsonby	13–9	Otahuhu	Victoria Park
3:00	Try: unknown x 1, Charles Savory, Barnard Longbottom; Con: A Cross; Pen: A Cross		Try: Charles Hally; Pen: Arthur Hardgrave 3	Referee: Archie Ferguson

27 June	City	21–8	Newton	Auckland Domain
3:00	Try: Albert Asher, G Rogers, Frederick Mansell, Charles Woolley, Harold Denize; Con: Ernie Asher 2 Pen: Ernie Asher (mark)		Try: J Allen, Bob Biggs; Pen: Joe Bennett	Referee: F Tyson

27 June	North Shore	12–7	Grafton	Devonport Domain
3:00	Try: George Seagar, Hec Wynyard; Con: Jack Paul; Pen: Jack Paul 2		Try: Karl Ifwersen; Pen: Karl Ifwersen 2	Referee: E. Dempsey

==== Round 8 ====
The match between North Shore and City was originally scheduled to take place at Victoria Park but was transferred to the Devonport Domain. The crowd of over 2 to 3,000 was said to have been the biggest crowd ever seen at the ground. The match was 'gated' and the league profited by around 25 pounds. The home team won 9 points to 7 thanks to a try to Stan Walters and 3 goals kicked by Jack Paul. Otahuhu won their first game of the season defeating Newton 10–5 at Victoria Park.

4 July	North Shore	9–7	City	Devonport Domain
3:00	Try: Stan Walters; Con: Jack Paul; Pen: Jack Paul 2		Try: R Burns; Pen: Ernie Asher 2	Attendance: 3,000; Referee: Dick Benson

4 July	Otahuhu	10-5	Newton	Victoria Park
3:00	Try: Montrose Stanaway, George Cook; Con: George Cook; Pen: Montrose Stanaway		Try: Ike Healey; Drop: Nia Hira	Referee: G Whitley

4 July	Ponsonby	15–3	Grafton	Auckland Domain
3:00	Try: Bernard Longbottom, Charles Savory, Thomas McClymont, D Corby, Fred Beacham		Try: P Owen	Referee: Tom Fielding

==== Round 9 ====
In the match between Otahuhu and Grafton, Montrose (Monty) Stanaway, the Otahuhu captain was ordered off the field by referee Tyson for disputing a decision. He was the younger brother of Alex Stanaway and Jack Stanaway. The match between North Shore and Newton was a farce with Newton only mustering 8 players. Two of the spectators joined the Newton team who were being trounced and the match finished 43 to 2 in favour of North Shore. The newspapers did not bother recording the point scorers though they did mention that the Shore side gave everybody in the team a chance to kick for goal.

11 July	Ponsonby	5–2	City	Victoria Park
3:00	Try: Jim Clark; Pen: Charles Webb (mark)		Pen: Ernie Asher	Attendance: 4,000; Referee: Archie Ferguson

11 July	Otahuhu	8–17	Grafton	Otahuhu
3:00	Try: George Cook, Arthur Hardgrave; Pen: Montrose Stanaway		Try: Bob Mitchell, Karl Ifwersen 2 Con: Karl Ifwersen 3 Pen: Karl Ifwersen	Referee: F Tyson

11 July	North Shore	43–2	Newton	Auckland Domain
3:00	Try: unknown x ? Con: unknown x ?		Pen: unknown x 1	Referee: Dick Benson

==== Final ====
A record crowd of 7,000 packed the Victoria Park sidelines with a sum of 300 pounds taken at the gates for the final which was a record for club games in Auckland. Ernie Bailey, one of the North Shore forwards dislocated his shoulder 15 minutes before full time but played on. Ponsonby played George Gillett at an extremely wide first five position which was criticised as they would indulge in long passing but make little progress, or else Gillett would kick too often. Beecham played out of position on the wing partly due to Ponsonby playing an extra back as they had the week prior.

18 July	North Shore	13-2	Ponsonby	Victoria Park
3:00	Try: Hec Wynyard, Edward Fox, Stan Weston; Con: Jack Paul 2		Pen: Charles Webb	Attendance: 7,000; Referee: Dick Benson

=== Top try scorers and point scorers ===
None of the North Shore point scorers from their farcical Round 9 match with the Newton Rangers, in which North Shore scored 43 points, were credited. Due to this lack of record, the following lists are incomplete.

Of note in the point-scoring lists is Grafton's Karl Ifwersen with 63 points. Grafton scored 75 points in total, meaning Ifwersen likely scored the highest percentage of team points in Auckland Rugby League history.

Rank	Player	Team	Games	Tries	Con	Pen	Mark	DG	Points
1	Karl Ifwersen	Grafton	9	7	7	14	-	-	63
2	George Cook	Otahuhu	7	7	2	2	-	-	29
3	Ernie Asher	City	9	-	6	8	-	-	28
4	Charles Webb	Ponsonby	9	2	1	7	1	-	24
5	Charles Savory	Ponsonby	10	6	1	3	-	-	26

Rank	Player	Team	Games	Tries
1	Karl Ifwersen	Grafton	9	7
2	George Cook	Otahuhu	8	7
3	G Rogers	City	8	6
4	Charles Savory	Ponsonby	10	6
5	Stan Walters	North Shore	10	4

== Lower grades ==
Whilst the draws were published in the New Zealand Herald and Auckland Star each Thursday, the results were only intermittently reported in the same newspapers on the Monday following games. On June 20 the Auckland Star gave the standings in all grades to that point so these tables have been pieced together from those standings and later reported results. As such the standings are incomplete though roughly accurate. Grades were made of the following teams with the winning team in bold.

=== Second grade ===
Northcote & Birkenhead Ramblers were awarded the second grade championship after August 8 as they were so far ahead of the trailing teams. Sunnyside defaulted their first match against Northcote and then withdrew from the competition. Northcote were given 2 competition points for the default but as no other side had the opportunity to play them those points were disallowed.

Team	Pld	W	D	L	B	F	A	Pts
Northcote & Birkenhead Ramblers	10	9	0	1	1	102	53	18
North Shore Albions	10	7	1	2	1	117	27	15
Newton Rangers	9	7	0	2	0	64	43	14
Ponsonby United	5	2	1	3	2	22	26	5
City Rovers	7	2	0	5	3	26	51	4
Grafton Athletic	8	1	0	7	1	29	90	2
Otahuhu Rovers	9	1	0	8	1	36	106	2

=== Third grade ===
Team	Pld	W	D	L	B	F	A	Pts
Ponsonby United	13	12	0	1	0	82	15	24
Remuera United	13	11	0	2	0	186	19	22
City Rovers	10	7	0	3	1	82	41	14
Sunnyside A	8	3	0	5	1	66	46	6
Manukau	6	3	0	3	0	45	53	6
Otahuhu Rovers	6	3	0	3	1	16	78	6
Newton Rangers	5	2	0	3	1	26	78	4
North Shore Albions	6	2	0	4	1	26	85	4
Hobsonville Pirates	5	1	0	4	1	36	74	2
Sunnyside B	5	0	0	5	1	5	114	0

=== Fourth grade ===
The fourth grade competition was terminated early owing to so many of its players enlisting in the military forces. City Rovers won the championship.

Team	Pld	W	D	L	B	F	A	Pts
City Rovers	11	11	0	0	0	193	20	22
Otahuhu Rovers A	6	5	0	1	0	71	21	10
Newton Rangers	6	4	0	2	0	96	45	8
North Shore Albions	7	4	0	3	0	42	47	8
Remuera United	9	4	0	5	0	31	43	8
Ponsonby United	7	3	0	4	0	55	52	6
Sunnyside	7	2	0	5	0	38	81	4
Manukau B	5	2	0	3	0	59	77	4
Grafton Athletic B	5	2	0	3	0	11	58	4
Manukau A	4	1	0	3	0	23	41	2
Otahuhu Rovers B	5	0	1	4	0	6	57	1
Grafton Athletic A	5	0	1	4	0	11	74	0

== Representative fixtures ==
Auckland began the representative season with a match with the touring England side who were on their first ever tour of New Zealand. Film footage exists of the match and is archived on the New Zealand Archive of Film, television and Sound Ngā Taonga website. Auckland was defeated 34–12 in front of 13,000 paying spectators at the Auckland Domain which allowed Auckland Rugby League to collect £519 and 2 shillings.

=== Auckland v England ===
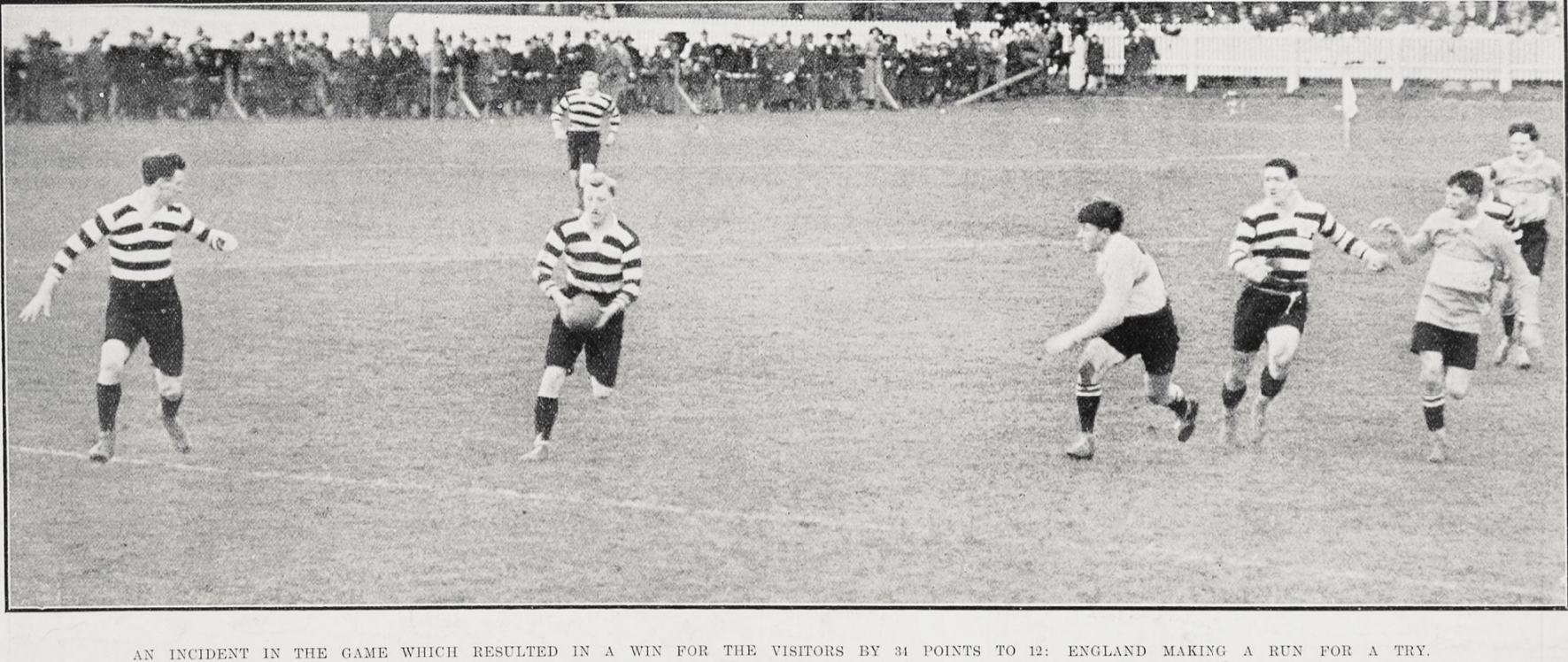

25 July	Auckland	12–34	England	Auckland Domain
3:00	Try: Charles Savory, Jim Clark; Con: Karl Ifwersen; Pen: Karl Ifwersen 2		Try: Stan Moorhouse 2, Billy Hall, Bert Jenkins, Johnny Rogers, Dick Ramsdale; Con: Alf Wood 5	Attendance: 13,000; Referee: Dick Benson

=== Auckland v Waikato (Northern Union Cup) ===
8 August	Auckland	29–10	Waikato	Auckland Domain
3:00	Try: Joe Bennett, Jim Clark, Karl Ifwersen, Edward Fox, Stan Weston, Charles Savory, Charles Woolley; Con: Ernie Asher 2, Charles Savory 2		Try: Cook, Smith; Pen: Henderson 2	Referee: Richard Calthorpe

=== Auckland B v Rotorua ===
8 August	Auckland B	29–11	Rotorua	Auckland Domain
3:00	Try: D Corby 3, Albert Asher, Harold Denize, George Warner, F Rogers; Con: Albert Asher 2, Monty Stanaway, George Warner		Try: B Harp, M Johnson 2 Con: Rukingi Reke	Referee: Billy Murray

=== Auckland v Taranaki (Northern Union Cup) ===
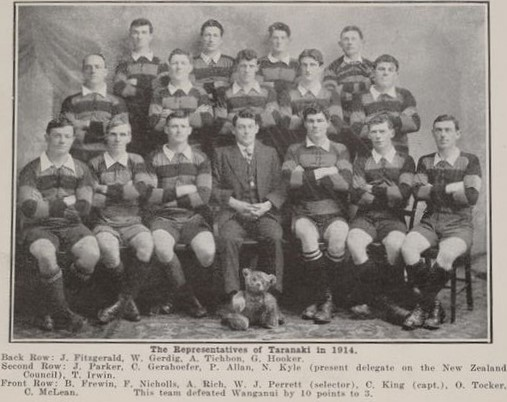
The Taranaki team which had beaten Wanganui 10-3 and came to Auckland to play the home side.

15 August	Auckland	35–4	Taranaki	Victoria Park
3:00	Try: Joe Bennett, Charles Savory, Jim Clark, George Seagar, Stan Walters, Harry Fricker, Rukingi Reke; Con: Charles Savory 6 Pen: Charles Savory		Pen: Gordon Hooker 2	Attendance: 4,000; Referee: William Wynyard

=== Auckland v Wellington (Northern Union Cup) ===
22 August	Auckland	10–6	Wellington	Victoria Park
3:00	Try: Leslie (Hec) Wynyard, Stan Weston; Con: Charles Savory; Pen: Charles Savory		Pen: George Bradley 2, Les Campbell	Attendance: 4000; Referee: Leonard Nield

=== Auckland representative matches played and scorers ===
The following list includes the 4 matches that the Auckland A team played and excludes the Auckland B team match.

No	Name	Club Team	Play	Tries	Con	Pen	Points
1	Charles Savory	Ponsonby	4	3	9	2	31
2	Karl Ifwersen	Grafton	2	1	1	2	9
2	Jim Clark	Ponsonby	4	3	0	0	9
4	Joe Bennett	Newton	4	2	0	0	6
4	Stan Weston	North Shore	2	2	0	0	6
6	Ernie Asher	City	1	0	2	0	4
7	Charles Woolley	City	4	1	0	0	3
7	Edward Fox	North Shore	3	1	0	0	3
7	Stan Walters	North Shore	4	1	0	0	3
7	George Seagar	North Shore	3	1	0	0	3
7	Rukingi Reke	Rotorua	2	1	0	0	3
7	Harry Fricker	Ponsonby	1	1	0	0	3
7	Leslie Henry (Hec) Wynyard	North Shore	1	1	0	0	3
14	Arthur Hardgrave	Otahuhu	4	0	0	0	0
14	Thomas McClymont	Ponsonby	3	0	0	0	0
14	J McDonald	Grafton	3	0	0	0	0
14	A Cross	Ponsonby	2	0	0	0	0
14	Bob Mitchell	Grafton	2	0	0	0	0
14	Harold Hayward	Thames	2	0	0	0	0
14	D Corby	Ponsonby	2	0	0	0	0
14	Charles Webb	Ponsonby	1	0	0	0	0
14	George Warner	City	1	0	0	0	0
14	Harold Denize	City	1	0	0	0	0

=== External links ===
- Auckland Rugby League Official Site
