= 1915 Auckland Rugby League season =

The 1915 season, and 7th of Auckland Rugby League saw the First Grade competition begin on 8 May featuring the same 6 senior clubs who had competed in 1914.

The First World War was in full effect by the time the 1915 season began. War had been declared just as the 1914 rugby league season was concluding in August 1914. As a result, several efforts were made during the 1915 season by the Auckland Rugby League to raise funds for Auckland Hospital Ship and Wounded Soldiers Relief Fund.

On 12 June, a seven-a-side tournament was arranged to be played at Victoria Park to raise money for the Auckland Hospital Ship and Wounded Relief Fund. In total £200 was raised with "almost 1,000 people" in attendance. All senior clubs entered teams and the final was played between North Shore Albions and City Rovers though the match was not completed because some earlier matches went to extra-time and the final saw an injury requiring a stoppage. As it had become dark it was decided to call the game off with North Shore leading by 3pts. A further £35 was raised from the 19 June round of matches at Victoria Park for the same cause.

Grafton Athletic were crowned First Grade champions for the first time after defeating City Rovers 10–5 in the championship final at Victoria Park in front of 4,000 spectators.

== News ==
=== Club teams by grade participation ===
Team	1st Grade	2nd Grade	3rd Grade	4th Grade	5th Grade	Total
City Rovers	1	1	2	1	1	6
Otahuhu Rovers	1	1	1	0	1	4
North Shore Albions	1	0	1	1	1	4
Ponsonby United	1	1	0	1	1	4
Newton Rangers	1	0	1	1	1	4
Grafton Athletic	1	1	0	1	1	4
Sunnyside	0	0	2	1	0	3
Richmond Rovers	0	0	1	1	1	3
Manukau	0	0	1	1	1	3
Remuera United	0	1	0	1	0	2
Northcote & Birkenhead Ramblers	0	1	0	1	0	2
Thames Old Boys	0	1	1	0	0	2
Māngere United	0	1	0	0	0	1
Total	6	8	10	10	8	42

=== Māngere Rangers ===
On April 14, the Māngere Rangers rugby league club was registered. They later were renamed to Māngere United. They were a junior club made up predominantly of Māori players and they fielded one team in the 1915 season in the Second grade. They finished in the top half of the standings behind City Rovers and Remuera. Their secretary for their first season was A. Te Meti. They only lasted 'one season' and a letter was written to the league in June 1916, informing them that the club had ceased to exist and all players from their second grade side were free to play for other sides. However, in 1918 they again entered a side in the second grade. Then in 1919 they were being coached by Jim Rukutai. The club continued to exist until 1934. Many of their players then became involved in the Manukau club and their children and grand children were associated with them for decades afterwards.

=== Thames Old Boys ===
At the start of the season a Thames Old Boys club was formed made up of players who had previously lived in or had a connection with the Thames area. They fielded teams in the Second and Third grades. The club only existed from 1915 to 1920. They went on annual playing excursions to the Thames area in three of their six seasons.

=== The beginning of the Roope Rooster ===
A trophy which is still played for today saw its beginnings in the 1915 season. Namely the Roope Rooster trophy which was donated by Mr. Pauntley Whittington (Dick) Roope. It was a knockout competition with one round of matches before semi-finals were played. Roope had retired from playing (for Ponsonby) and was the Auckland Rugby League chairman to start the season. However he resigned his position in order to be able to resume playing for the young Grafton Athletic club. With the semi-final between Newton and Grafton being drawn (after North Shore received the bye) the management committee decided rather than replaying a match between the same teams there would be more interest in a match between Grafton and North Shore, with Newton progressing to the final. The second semi-final was played at Victoria Park and saw both teams wearing white armbands in memory of 3 men killed in action at the Dardanelles who had played club rugby league in Auckland (Charles Savory from Ponsonby United, Charles James Hally from Otahuhu, and William Moeki from City Rovers). A charge was made for the semi-final between North Shore and Grafton with the proceeds going to the Door of Hope, the Salvation Army Maternity and Rescue Homes, Sister Esther's Relief Work, and the St John Ambulance Brigade. The final was played on 11 September at Victoria Park between North Shore Albions and Newton Rangers, with North Shore winning 10 points to 7.

=== Patriotic Carnival Match ===
On July 3 a Patriotic Carnival was held at the Auckland Domain with various sports and events played. Some junior league matches took place along with an exhibition game between Grafton and City which was won by Grafton 15 to 10. For Grafton, Dick Roope, of Roope Rooster fame scored two of their tries. For City George Asher, younger brother of Albert and Ernie scored a try while their other try was scored by William Mincham. Mincham later became a test referee and his son Ted, and grandson Robert both played for New Zealand.

3 July	Grafton	15–10	City	Auckland Domain
3:30	Try: Tom Haddon, Dougie McGregor, Dick Roope 2, Bob Mitchell		Try: William Mincham, George Asher; Con: Ernie Asher; Pen: Ernie Asher	Attendance: 15,000; Referee: Billy Murray

Preceded by 1914	7th Auckland Rugby League season 1915	Succeeded by 1916

== 1st Grade championship (Myers Cup) ==
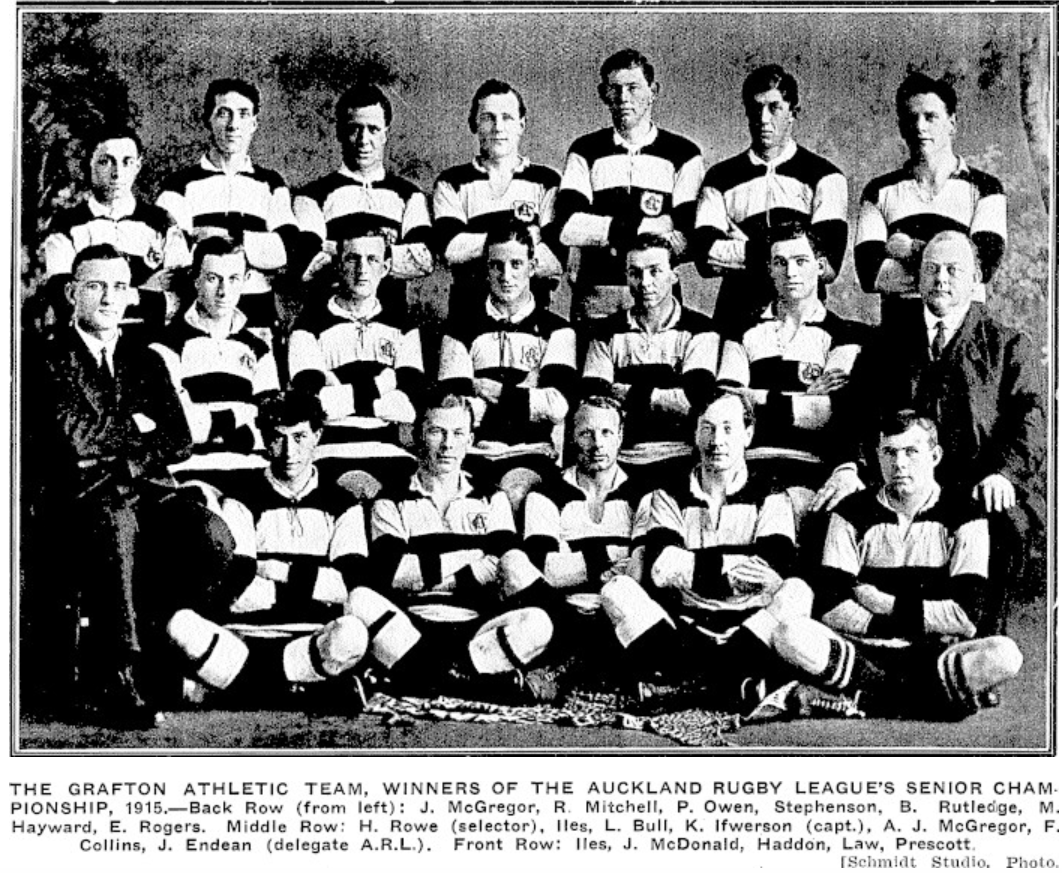
The champion Grafton Athletic team.

The 1st grade championship had been competing for the Myers Cup from 1910 to 1914 but after the beginning of the war the league decided to not award trophies though the grade competitions were still competed for as normal. Twenty eight matches were played in the 1st grade competition. Nine full rounds were played followed by the final. Victoria Park was the main ground used, with matches also played at the Auckland Domain, Devonport Domain, and Otahuhu.

=== Statistics ===
Including the knockout games there were 34 first grade games played with 132 tries, 56 conversions, 52 penalties, 0 drop goals, and 13 goals from a mark. The average number of points per game was 18.8, with 3.9 tries per game. With 56 conversions from 132 attempts the successful percentage was 42.4. The points per game decreased from 19.1 in 1914 to 18.8. The successful conversion percentage went from 35.8 to 42.4.

=== 1st Grade standings ===
Team	Pld	W	D	L	F	A	Pts
Grafton Athletic	10	7	1	2	118	70	15
City Rovers	10	6	1	3	93	63	13
Ponsonby United	9	5	1	3	93	63	11
North Shore Albions	9	4	1	4	76	83	9
Newton Rangers	9	3	0	6	80	118	6
Otahuhu Rovers	9	1	0	8	48	111	2

=== 1st Grade fixtures ===
==== Round 1 ====
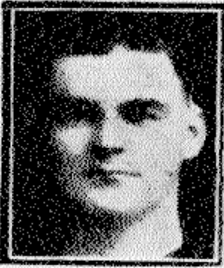
Bill Davidson

Bill Davidson debuted for City aged just 18. He kicked a goal but did not play again for them until the following season. He would represent New Zealand 4 years later in 1919. Graham Walker Cook debuted for Ponsonby in the forwards. He enlisted in the war effort and died his wounds in France on July 11, 1916 aged 22. Bernard Farrelly debuted in the halves for Otahuhu. He departed New Zealand in July 1917 for the war effort and was killed in action on August 30, 1918 in France. He is buried at Bancourt British Cemetery, Pas-de-Calais, France.

8 May	City	15–0	Newton	Auckland Domain
3:00	Try: Vic Barchard, Harold Denize, A Brooks, Jim Rukutai, Bill Davidson			Referee: A Vause

8 May	Grafton	11-2	Ponsonby	Victoria Park
3:00	Try: Dougie McGregor; Con: Karl Ifwersen; Pen: Karl Ifwersen 2 & a mark		Pen: Charles Webb	Referee: Tom Fielding

8 May	Otahuhu	3–4	North Shore	Otahuhu
3:00	Try: William McManus		Pen: Jack Paul 2

==== Round 2 ====
Frederick Louis Trezise debuted for City. Several weeks later the league denied his registration due to some discipline issue stemming from his time in rugby. He had been sent off when playing for the City rugby club in a match against Marist in June 1914 and suspended. Trezise was an Auckland representative player and played 15 matches for them from 1910–13, and again later in 1923. He also played rugby for New Zealand Māori on their 1922 tour of Australia. Walter Frost debuted for Otahuhu and was moved into the five eighth position. Towards the end of 1917 he joined the forces and departed for Europe. He was a prisoner of war during 1918 at the Stalag VIII-Band camp in Poland and died of disease (Peritonitis) on October 13, 1918 aged 22. He is buried at Berlin South-Western Cemetery, Berlin, Germany.

15 May	Ponsonby	4–0	City	Victoria Park
3:00	Pen: Frank McWhirter 2 (marks)			Referee: Archie Ferguson

15 May	North Shore	24–3	Newton	Devonport Domain
3:00	Try: Stan Walters 2, Jack Paul, G Stewart, S Chatfield, C Nicholson; Con: Jack Paul 2 Pen: Jack Paul		Try: Joe Bennett	Referee: Billy Murray

15 May	Otahuhu	0–10	Grafton	Otahuhu
3:00			Try: Karl Ifwersen, Brook; Con: Karl Ifwersen; Pen: Karl Ifwersen	Referee: Leonard Nield

==== Round 3 ====
City travelled out to Otahuhu where they lost 2-0. They were without the services of Charles Woolley, Harold (Ray) Denize, and A Brooks who had all just signed up for the war effort. It was also reported that R. Burns who had played for City last season had been wounded in battle. Sam Magee was also unavailable due to injury while Don Kenealy was away on business. George Asher, the younger brother of Albert and Ernie joined them in the backs and played a good game at inside centre. Bert Farrelly won Otahuhu the game with a penalty kicked from halfway.

22 May	Grafton	7–7	North Shore	Victoria Park
3:00	Try: P Owen; Pen: Karl Ifwersen 2		Try: Stan Walters; Con: Jack Paul; Pen: Jack Paul	Referee: Leonard Nield

22 May	Ponsonby	14–2	Newton	Auckland Domain
3:00	Try: Spence Jones 3, George Paki; Con: Thomas McClymont		Pen: Joe Bennett	Referee: F Tyson

22 May	Otahuhu	2–0	City	Otahuhu
3:00	Pen: Bernard Farrelly			Referee: E Dempsey

==== Round 4 ====
In the match between Ponsonby and Otahuhu following a penalty being awarded to Ponsonby Arthur Hardgrave threw the ball back and it struck the referee (Richard Calthorpe) on the back of the neck and he was ordered off. It was unclear if this was accidental or deliberate according to the NZ Herald reporter of the time. At the disciplinary committee Hardgrave apologised and said that he had thrown the ball away in frustration and not at anybody in particular. The league decided to leave the matter there. During the game future New Zealand international halfback, Bill Walsh left the field injured. He was replaced by a young Arthur Matthews who would also go on to represent New Zealand in 1919, the same year as Walsh. Grafton beat Newton 15-11 with Karl Ifwersen scoring 2 tries, 2 conversions, and 1 penalty before leaving the field with an injured thigh late in the game. Alan Blakey returned to the field for the first time in 2 seasons and scored one of Newton's tries. City won their second match of the season, beating North Shore 15-8 and remarkably had not conceded a try through 4 matches.

29 May	Ponsonby	19–9	Otahuhu	Victoria Park 1
3:00	Try: W Edwards, Thomas McClymont, Bernard Longbottom; Con: A Cross 3 Pen: A Cross 2		Try: A Richardson; Con: Bernard Farrelly; Pen: Bernard Farrelly 2	Referee: Richard Calthorpe

29 May	Grafton	15–11	Newton	Auckland Domain
3:00	Try: Karl Ifwersen 2, F Collins; Con: Karl Ifwersen 2 Pen: Karl Ifwersen		Try: R Clark, Alan Blakey, Len Farrant; Con: R Clark	Referee: G Whitley

29 May	North Shore	8–15	City	Devonport Domain 1
3:00	Pen: Jack Paul 2 & 2 marks		Try: Albert Asher 3 Con: Ernie Asher 3	Referee: Tom Fielding

==== Round 5 ====
The Asher brothers, Albert, Ernie, and George scored all 16 of City's points in their 16-10 win over Grafton. Otahuhu were missing forwards, Sharpe, and Doherty. Both had tried to enlist for the war effort but were turned down for medical reasons so had traveled to Australia to try and enlist there. Also McCallion had moved to South Africa to farm. John Fischer had not intended to play as he was suffering from influenza, while Spence had not fully recovered from injury suffered the previous week. Captain Arthur Hardgrave was also unavailable. J Maurice made a reappearance to help the stricken side but lacked fitness and struggled. Under the circumstances they did well to only lose to Newton 18-6. During North Shore's loss to Ponsonby their captain, Hec Wynyard walked off the field and stood on the sideline.

19 June	City	16–10	Grafton	Victoria Park 1
3:00	Try: George Asher 2, Albert Asher 2 Con: Ernie Asher; Pen: Ernie Asher		Try: John McGregor 2 Pen: Karl Ifwersen & 1 mark	Referee: Dick Benson

19 June	Ponsonby	18–0	North Shore	Victoria Park 2
3:00	Try: Victor McCollum 2 Con: A Cross 2 Pen: A Cross 3, Spence Jones			Referee: A Vause

19 June	Newton	18–6	Otahuhu	Victoria Park 3
3:00	Try: Bowen, Joe Bennett, Bob Biggs, Charles Potier; Con: Joe Bennett 2 Pen: Adelbert Tobin		Try: John Fischer, J Spence	Referee: Archie Ferguson

==== Round 6 ====
Otahuhu was significantly weakened once more with Richardson and Browne unavailable, Arthur Hardgrave out with illness and Bert Farrelly who missed the train from Otahuhu to the City and arrived only a few minutes before halftime. They put up a good showing however and only lost by a point to North Shore. Jack Stanaway returned to the field and played at fullback for the South Auckland side. For Ponsonby, Bernard Longbottom was ordered off for questioning the referee.

26 June	Grafton	10–5	Ponsonby	Victoria Park 1
3:00	Try: F Rogers, John McGregor; Pen: Karl Ifwersen & 1 mark		Try: Spence Jones; Con: A Cross	Referee: Archie Ferguson

26 June	City	16–13	Newton	Auckland Domain
3:00	Try: Vic Barchard 2, George Asher, Jim Rukutai; Con: Ernie Asher 2		Try: Richard Rope, R Clark, Len Farrant; Con: R Clark; Pen: R Clark	Referee: Tom Fielding

26 June	North Shore	11–10	Otahuhu	Devonport Domain
3:00	Try: Perritt, T Paul, J McDonald; Con: Jack Paul		Try: John Fischer, J Spence; Con: Montrose Stanaway, Bernard Farrelly	Referee: Billy Murray

==== Round 7 ====
All of the matches were played in poor conditions at Victoria Park. Rugby union and hockey had cancelled all of their matches but rugby league went ahead with the fields in a messy state. In the match between Newton and North Shore, Stan Walters, and Richard Rope were sent off for "rough play". In the Ponsonby v City game, H Manning and Harry Francis were also ordered off for rough play late in the match with both players throwing punches at each other. Manning had to be attended to with a "badly cut face". It was decided by the league to suspend both players for four weeks though City appealed the decision.

10 July	Ponsonby	3–3	City	Victoria Park 1
3:00	Try: Spence Jones		Try: Vic Barchard	Attendance: 2,000; Referee: Tom Fielding

10 July	Grafton	21–3	Otahuhu	Victoria Park 2
3:00	Try: F Rogers, John McGregor 3, George Iles; Con: Karl Ifwersen 2, Dougie McGregor		Try: Ralph Wrightson	Attendance: 2,000; Referee: G Whitley

10 July	Newton	5–3	North Shore	Victoria Park 3
3:00	Try: Bob Biggs; Con: R Clark		Try: Hec Wynyard	Attendance: 2,000; Referee: Richard Calthorpe

==== Round 8 ====
17 July	Newton	19–10	Ponsonby	Victoria Park
3:00	Try: R Clark 2, Joe Bennett, Charles Potier, Richard Rope; Con: R Clark; Pen: R Clark		Try: Spence Jones, Danrell; Con: A Cross; Pen: A Cross	Referee: Billy Murray

17 July	North Shore	12–9	Grafton	Devonport Domain
3:00	Try: Hec Wynyard, C Nicholson; Con: Jack Paul; Pen: Jack Paul 2		Try: Warner; Con: Karl Ifwersen; Pen: Karl Ifwersen 2	Referee: Archie Ferguson

17 July	City	10–6	Otahuhu	Auckland Domain
3:00	Try: Vic Barchard, Albert Asher; Con: Ernie Asher; Pen: Ernie Asher		Try: J Spence, E.J. Donohue	Referee: F Tyson

==== Round 9 ====
24 July	Grafton	15–9	Newton	Victoria Park 1
3:00	Try: Tom Haddon, Karl Ifwersen, Bob Mitchell; Pen: Karl Ifwersen 2 (and 1 mark)		Try: Joe Bennett; Pen: R Clark 2 (and 1 mark)	Attendance: 4,000; Referee: G Whitley

24 July	City	13–7	North Shore	Victoria Park 2
3:00	Try: Jim Rukutai; Con: Ernie Asher; Pen: Ernie Asher 2 (and 2 marks)		Try: C Nicholson; Con: Jack Paul; Pen: Jack Paul	Attendance: 4,000; Referee: Billy Murray

24 July	Otahuhu	9–18	Ponsonby	Otahuhu
3:00	Try: John Fischer; Con: Bernard Farrelly; Pen: Bernard Farrelly 2		Try: Spence Jones, Victor McCollum, W Edwards, unknown x 1 Con: A Cross; Pen: A Cross 2	Referee: T Hill

==== Championship final ====
Grafton won their only ever first grade championship with a 10-5 win over City. Karl Ifwersen who had been chiefly responsible for the formation of the club captained them and scored a try and kicked 2 conversions. Warner, a forward scored their other try. Somewhat ironically Dick Roope had to be carried off the field with an injured knee and therefore missed the Roope Rooster knockout competition for the trophy which he had donated to the league. He had started the year as chairman of the league but resigned his position to resume playing. There was significant controversy around the appointment of the referee for the final. The City club applied for Dick Benson to referee the match but the referee's association declined. The Grafton club then suggested that Leonard Nield should be appointed, however the Association decided on Archie Ferguson. This did not satisfy the City club however and their delegate R. Pollock said that Mr Ferguson "had evinced bias against the City club and had publicly expressed opinions concerning one or two players". After much too-ing and fro-ing it was decided to ask Billy Murray if he would referee but the Grafton club objected to his appointment. They then decided to appoint Leonard Nield but the referees themselves had had their tempers raised and on the Saturday and they did not want to change the original appointment. In the end the City players unanimously agreed to take the field under Archie Ferguson and so he refereed the match. After the conclusion of the match Pollock said "we were beaten, and it was our own fault". While the City captain, Albert Asher said "the club has had several disagreements, but after last Saturday we shall always be pleased to see Mr. Ferguson as referee". Playing in the final for City was forward Samuel Russell Magee. He was killed in an "unfortunate accident on the Main Trunk line to the troop train which was taking recruits to Trentham" on October 12, 1915.

31 Jul	Grafton	10–5	City	Victoria Park 1
3:00	Try: Karl Ifwersen, G Warner; Con: Karl Ifwersen 2		Try: William Mincham; Con: Ernie Asher	Attendance: 4,000; Referee: Archie Ferguson

=== Roope Rooster knockout competition ===
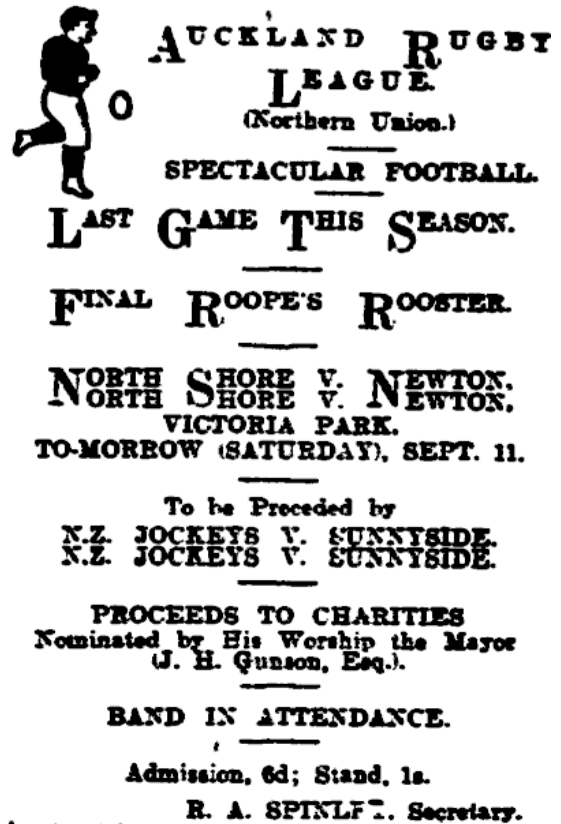

Newton, Grafton and North Shore were round 1 victors and North Shore received a bye meaning they should have advanced to the final directly. However Grafton and Newton played out a 2–2 draw in their semi-final. Rather than play a replay the league decided to have a second semi-final match between Grafton and North Shore, with Newton progressing to the final. North Shore beat Grafton and then defeated Newton in the final to win the inaugural Roope Rooster trophy which is still played for today. P.W. (Dick) Roope was confined to bed after badly injuring his knee in the Grafton win over City in the championship final.

==== Round 1 ====
At Devonport the City side evidently did not take the new trophy seriously and began the game with 10 men and only 3 forwards. Eventually Jim Rukutai joined the game but played without boots and in a pair of long trousers. Despite this under the leadership of Albert Asher they hung in the game and threatened to make a match of it before North Shore finished them off. It was also mentioned that neither Otahuhu or Newton took their game seriously either. Otahuhu scored 3 unconverted tries to O'Connell, Fisher, and Eustace, and had 3 others disallowed for minor infractions to Spence, Simmonds, and McManus, but still lost comfortably to Newton 24-9 with R Clark scoring 15 points through 3 tries and 3 conversions. Near the end of the game O'Connell, who was playing out of position at five eighth broke his leg after he attempted to gather the ball but collided with Thomas of Newton. The match was then called off several minutes from time.

7 August	Grafton	13–9	Ponsonby	Victoria Park 1
3:00	Try: Karl Ifwersen 3 Con: Karl Ifwersen 2		Try: D Corby, Spence Jones, Frank McWhirter	Attendance: 3,000; Referee: Richard Calthorpe

7 August	North Shore	16–8	City	Devonport Domain 1
3:00	Try: T Paul 2, D Fife, Anderson; Con: Jack Paul 2		Try: Bernard Tresize, Bert Avery; Con: Albert Asher	Referee: Tom Fielding

7 August	Otahuhu	9–24	Newton	Otahuhu 1
3:00	Try: Alf Eustace, John Fisher, O’Connell		Try: R Clark 3, Richard Rope 2, unknown x 1 Con: R Clark 3	Referee: Joseph Herrick

==== Semi-final ====
14 August	Newton	2–2	Grafton	Victoria Park 1
3:00	Drop: Charles Potier		Pen: C Owen (mark)	Referee: Archie Ferguson

==== Semi-final ====
The death of Charles Savory was confirmed recently and there was much lamenting of his death at Gallipoli. Players wore white arm bands in his memory along with Charles Hally, William Moeki, and Miller, who had all been killed at Gallipoli. It was also reported that Edward Fox and George Seagar were on the front lines. Dougie McGregor and Mason had their tries singled out as two of the most outstanding ever seen at Victoria Park, McGregor scything through the North Shore backs to graze the posts to score while Mason made a strong "cork screw run" beating several Grafton backs to score by the posts. Mason had recently joined the side and was a Māori player who had played rugby in the South Island.

21 August	North Shore	17–13	Grafton	Victoria Park
3:00	Try: Ernie Bailey, C Nicholson, Mason; Con: Jack Paul 2 Pen: Jack Paul, Harper		Try: Dougie McGregor 2, F Collins; Con: Karl Ifwersen; Pen: Karl Ifwersen (mark)	Attendance: 3,500; Referee: Billy Murray

==== Final ====
Heavy rain set in before the game and the field was covered in water in many areas. North Shore won the match to claim the first ever Roope Rooster title by 10 points to 7.

11 September	North Shore	10–7	Newton	Victoria Park
3:00	Try: Morgan, Stan Walters; Con: Jack Paul; Pen: Jack Paul		Try: Joe Bennett; Pen: Joe Bennett, R Clark	Referee: Billy Murray

=== Top try scorers and point scorers ===
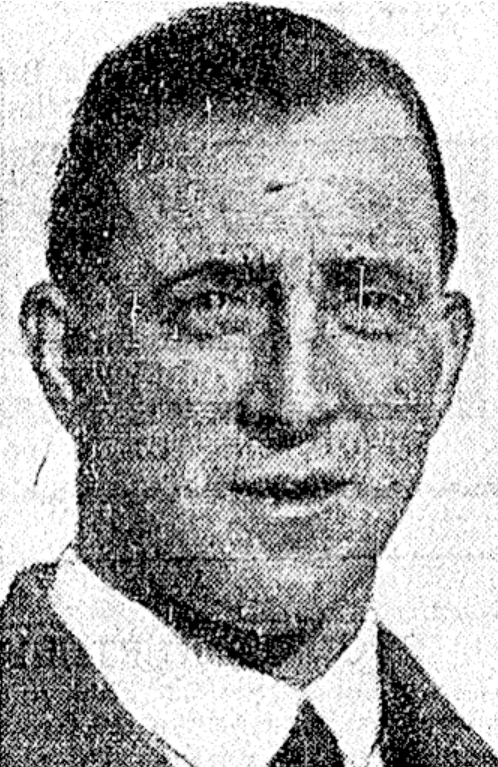
Karl Ifwersen (top point scorer and try scorer).

The following point scoring lists include both Senior Championship matches and the Roope Rooster competition but does not include the exhibition match at the Patriotic Carnival between Grafton and City. Unlike in previous seasons where there were several matches with incomplete scoring lists the 1915 season was well reported by the New Zealand Herald and only two tries were unattributed (one for Ponsonby and one for Newton). For the second year in a row the outstanding Karl Ifwersen easily topped the point scoring lists. Ifwersen, Paul, and Ernie Asher all kicked goals from marks (when they or a teammate caught a kicked ball on the full within goal kicking range) which were worth 2 points.

Rank	Player	Team	Games	Tries	Con	Pen	Mark	DG	Points
1	Karl Ifwersen	Grafton	12	8	11	15	3	-	82
2	Jack Paul	North Shore	12	1	11	11	2	-	51
3	R Clark	Newton	10	7	7	6	-	-	47
4	A Cross	Ponsonby	9	-	8	8	-	-	32
5	Ernie Asher	City	11	-	10	3	2	-	30

Rank	Player	Team	Games	Tries
1	Karl Ifwersen	Grafton	12	8
1	Spence Jones	Ponsonby	10	8
3	R Clark	Newton	10	7
4	Albert Asher	City	11	6
5	Vic Barchard	City	11	5
5	Joe Bennett	Newton	12	5
5	John McGregor	Grafton	13	5

== Charity Carnival ==
Then on 3 July a "Patriotic Carnival" was held involving the Auckland Hockey Association, Auckland Rugby League, Auckland Rugby Union, and the Auckland Football Association. In addition there was a golf competition and a school basketball competition. Over 15,000 people crammed into the Auckland Domain to watch the matches. In the league matches Grafton Athletic defeated City Rovers by 15 points to 10. For Grafton tries were scored by Bob Mitchell, Roope (2), and Tom Haddon, while for City George Asher and William Mincham scored tries with Ernie Asher kicking a conversion and penalty. In the second grade match City Rovers beat Māngere 8 points to 3, and in the fourth grade match the Manukau Rovers defeated Ponsonby United by 8 points to 3 also.

=== Charity seven-a-side tournament results ===
	Date		Score		Score	Venue	Notes
First round	12 June	Newton Rangers	10	Grafton B	0	Victoria Park	
–	–	Ponsonby United A	8	City Rovers B	8	Victoria Park	* City Rovers won in extra-time
–	–	Grafton Athletic A	17	Otahuhu B	0	Victoria Park	
–	–	City Rovers A	8	Otahuhu A	0	Victoria Park	-
–	–	North Shore Albions	5	Ponsonby B	0	Victoria Park	-
Second round	–	Newton Rangers	15	City Rovers B	10	Victoria Park	Won in extra-time with a converted try
Semi-final	–	City Rovers A	8	Grafton Athletic A	5	Victoria Park	–
Semi-final	–	North Shore Albions	3	Newton Rangers	2	Victoria Park	-
Final	–	North Shore Albions	3	City Rovers	0	Victoria Park	Match Abandoned due to darkness, with N Shore awarded the win with City's support.

== Lower grades ==
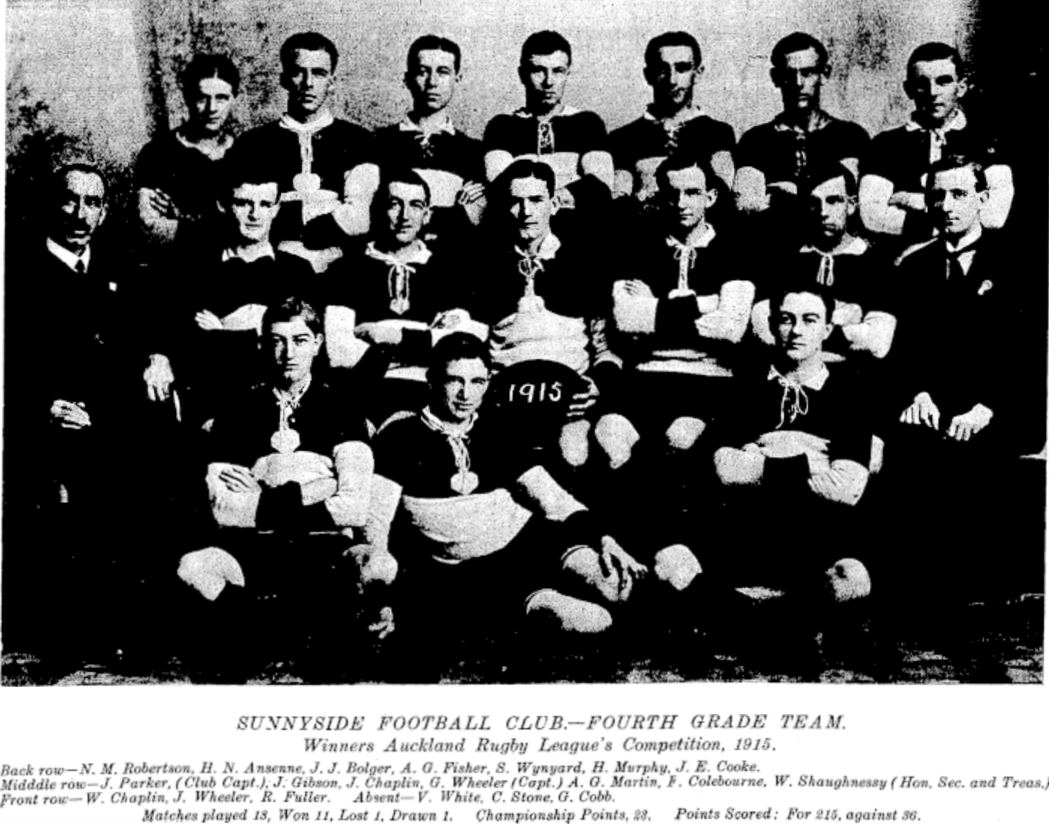
Sunnyside team which won the 4th grade competition.

The lower grades consisted of second, third, fourth, and for the first time a fifth grade. New teams included Thames Old Boys, made up of players from Thames who had settled in Auckland, and Richmond Rovers who were affiliated with the Eden Ramblers club but soon after became a club on their own.

J. Endean donated a shield to be awarded to the winner of the fourth grade competition in memory of his brother, Arthur Endean who had been killed in action at the Dardanelles. The shield would be named the Trooper Arthur Endean Shield.

=== Second grade standings ===
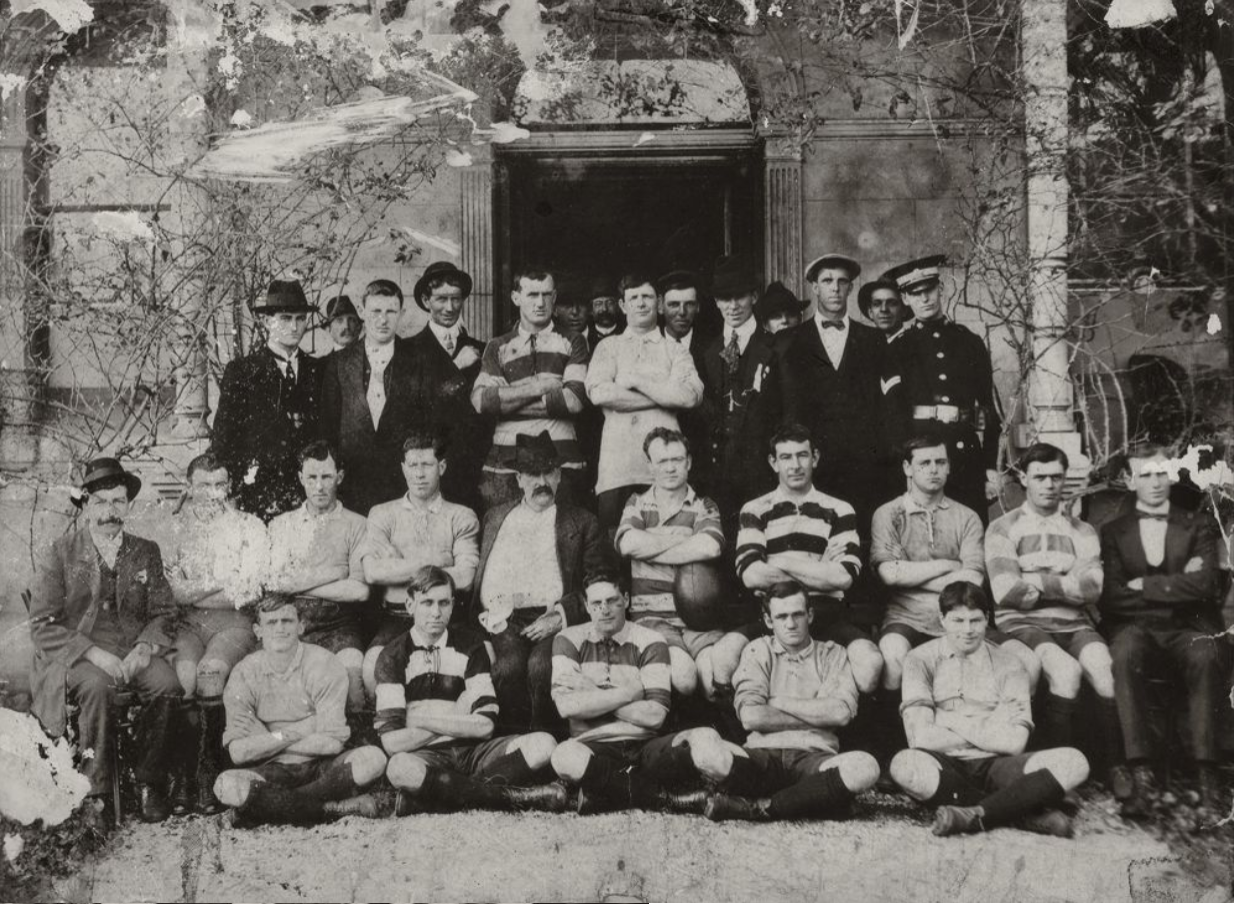
The Otahuhu second grade team.

Northcote withdrew after 5 rounds.

Team	Played	W	D	L	B	F	A	Pts
City Rovers	14	14	0	0	1	236	38	28
Remuera United	11	8	0	3	1	111	33	16
Māngere Rangers	10	6	0	4	1	57	108	12
Thames Old Boys	8	3	0	5	1	56	50	6
Ponsonby United	8	2	0	6	0	47	131	4
Otahuhu Rovers	5	1	0	4	1	39	29	2
Grafton Athletic	7	0	0	7	1	12	121	0
Northcote & Birkenhead Ramblers	4	0	0	4	0	17	65	0

=== Third grade standings ===
The majority of the Sunnyside B team enlisted during the season and this meant they could no longer field a team. The remaining players transferred to their A side. The North Shore side also withdrew in late August for the same reason.

Team	Played	W	D	L	B	F	A	Points
Sunnyside A	11	10	1	0	1	116	26	21
City Rovers A	11	9	0	2	0	122	25	18
Newton Rangers	11	7	1	3	1	156	52	15
Manukau	7	2	0	5	0	24	38	4
Thames Old Boys	7	2	0	5	1	30	65	4
City Rovers B	7	2	0	5	0	11	74	4
Richmond Rovers	6	1	0	5	1	17	66	2
North Shore Albions	5	1	0	4	0	5	53	2
Otahuhu Rovers	3	1	0	2	0	3	17	2
Sunnyside B	3	0	0	3	0	3	40	0

=== Fourth grade standings (Endean Shield) ===
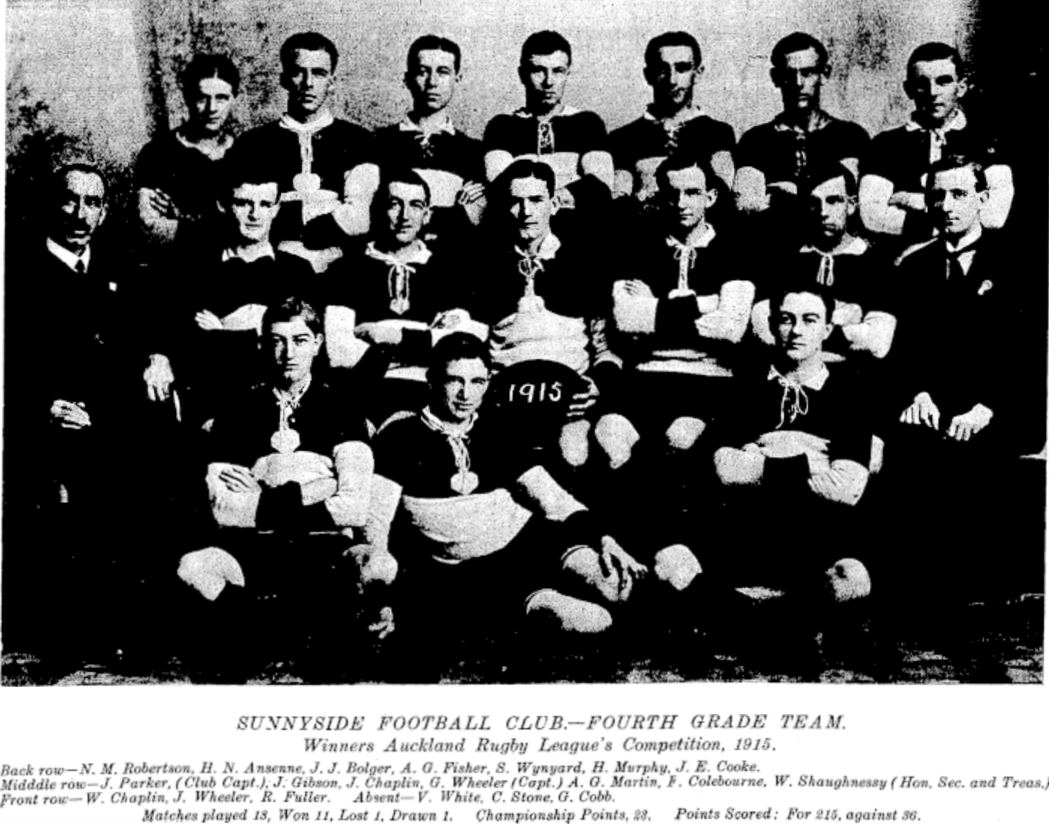
Sunnyside team which won the competition.

Sunnyside won with a record of 11 wins, 1 draw and 1 loss, 215 points for and 36 against. The Grafton Athletic side withdrew after 3 rounds, following a loss to Manukau in round 1 and then a default loss to Sunnyside in round 2. While the Newton Rangers withdrew after 7 rounds and City Rovers a week later.

Team	Played	Won	Draw	Loss	Bye	For	Against	Points
Sunnyside	13	11	1	1	0	215	36	23
Ponsonby United	13	10	0	3	0	129	46	20
Manukau	10	7	0	3	1	97	67	14
Richmond Rovers	9	4	1	4	1	65	58	9
North Shore Albions	8	2	1	5	1	80	78	5
Remuera United	5	2	0	3	1	44	36	4
Newton Rangers	4	1	0	3	0	8	73	2
Northcote & Birkenhead Ramblers	8	0	0	8	1	18	33	0
City Rovers	4	0	0	4	0	6	112	0
Grafton Athletic	2	0	0	2	0	0	0	0

=== Fifth grade standings ===
Remuera withdrew after the first round, Sunnyside withdrew after round 3, while Richmond withdrew after 4 rounds. It is likely that Remuera and Sunnyside did not take the field and therefore they have been excluded from the standings. City rovers had reportedly scored 220 points and conceded 0 after their August 28 win over Otahuhu, however they had won the match 12-2, and early won a match with Newton 5-3, so the record was more likely 220-5 at this point. They then defeated Ponsonby 17-0, with their final match score not reported.

Team	Played	Won	Draw	Loss	Bye	For	Against	Points
City Rovers	10	10	0	0	0	239	5	20
Newton Rangers	9	6	0	3	0	50	74	12
North Shore Albions	7	4	1	2	0	82	66	9
Ponsonby United	7	3	0	4	0	40	45	6
Grafton Athletic	7	1	1	5	2	22	160	3
Otahuhu Rovers	4	1	0	3	1	19	47	2
Manukau	7	0	0	7	1	3	58	0
Richmond Rovers	1	0	0	1	0	0	0	0

== Representative season ==
Due to World War I having broken out and the large number of players who had gone to fight the representative season was far reduced from previous years. The Auckland Rugby League did however decide to play 3 fixtures at the end of the season to support fledgling country leagues. Auckland had seen the death of a representative player already when Charles Savory died of his wounds at Gallipoli. The first representative match of the season was played on 28 August when Auckland defeated Thames by 27 points to 16 at Victoria Park with over 4,000 in attendance. In the return match a week later Thames won 25–13. The following weekend saw Auckland lose to Waikato in Huntly, though they had several new combinations and the first ever Roope Rooster club final was played at the same time in Auckland. A junior representative fixture was played as the curtain-raiser with Auckland winning by 16 points to 3 over a Lower Waikato team.

=== Representative fixtures ===
==== Auckland v Thames ====
28 August	Auckland	27–16	Thames	Victoria Park
3:00	Try: Dougie McGregor, Spence Jones, A Cross, Stan Walters, F Rogers 2, Jim Rukutai, Frank McWhirter; Con: A Cross 2, Stan Walters		Try: V Ryan 2, A Lomas 2 Con: J Winder; Drop: V Ryan	Attendance: 4,000; Referee: Leonard Nield

==== Auckland v Thames ====
In the return match 350 Auckland supporters made the journey on board the Wakatere and were entertained by the Onehunga Brass Band. Thames won with a second half comeback with the wind. Auckland captain 'Hec' Wynyard was injured about 10 minutes before halftime with a kick to his side and retired at halftime with Scotty McClymont moving from full back to centre, Rogers shifting from prop to fullback and F Tresize coming on as the substitute. The City Rovers and Thames Old Boys clubs from Auckland played in a curtain raiser.

4 September	Thames	25–13	Auckland	Dodd's Paddock, Parawai (Thames)
3:00	Try: R Smith, Tookey 3, V Ryan; Con: M Maddison 3 Pen: M Maddison 2		Try: F Collins, Jim Clark 2 Con: Stan Walters; Pen: Jim Clark	Referee: E. T. Price

==== Auckland v Lower Waikato ====
11 September	Lower Waikato	19–6	Auckland	Huntly
3:00	Try: D Bookham 2, A Cook, George Paki, H Johnson; Con: H Peckham, F Littlewood		Try: J Spence, Forsyth	Referee: Leonard Nield

=== Auckland representative matches played and scorers ===
The Forsyth who scored a try in the match against Lower Waikato is an unknown player. There had been no player by that name mentioned in Auckland club rugby league at all during the season.

No	Name	Club Team	Play	Tries	Con	Pen	Points
1	Jim Clark	Ponsonby	1	2	0	1	8
2	A Cross	Ponsonby	2	1	2	0	7
2	Stan Walters	North Shore	2	1	2	0	7
4	F Rogers	Grafton	2	2	0	0	6
5	Spence Jones	Ponsonby	2	1	0	0	3
5	Frank McWhirter	Ponsonby	1	1	0	0	3
5	F Collins	Grafton	1	1	0	0	3
5	Dougie McGregor	Grafton	1	1	0	0	3
5	J Spence	Otahuhu	1	1	0	0	3
5	Forsyth	unknown	1	1	0	0	3
11	Jim Rukutai	City	2	0	0	0	0
11	George Asher	City	2	0	0	0	0
11	Joe Bennett	Newton	2	0	0	0	0
11	Henry Boylan	City	1	0	0	0	0
11	Hec Wynyard	North Shore	2	0	0	0	0
11	Bill Walsh	Ponsonby	2	0	0	0	0
11	Albert Asher	City	1	0	0	0	0
11	Ernie Asher	City	1	0	0	0	0
11	Thomas McClymont	Ponsonby	2	0	0	0	0
11	Monty Stanaway	Otahuhu	2	0	0	0	0
11	Frederick Trezise	City	1	0	0	0	0
11	John McGregor	Grafton	1	0	0	0	0
11	William Mincham	City	1	0	0	0	0
11	Victor McCollum	Ponsonby	1	0	0	0	0
11	John Fischer	Otahuhu	1	0	0	0	0
11	Barnard Longbottom	Ponsonby	1	0	0	0	0
11	A Richardson	Otahuhu	1	0	0	0	0
11	Sam McGee	City	1	0	0	0	0
11	Ralph Wrightson	Otahuhu	1	0	0	0	0
