= Remuera League Football Club =

Defunct NZ rugby league club, based in Auckland

Club information
- Full name: Remuera League Football Club
- Founded: 1914
- Exited: 1929

Former details
- Grounds: Remuera; Auckland Domain
- Coach: George A. Gillett
- Competition: Auckland Rugby League

The Remuera League Football Club was a rugby league club which existed from 1914 to 1915 before being revived in 1927. They fielded teams in 1928 and 1929 before ceasing to exist. They competed in the Auckland Rugby League lower grade competitions and were based in Remuera in central Auckland, New Zealand.

== History ==
=== 1914–1915: original years ===
On 25 April The New Zealand Herald reported that two new clubs would compete in the Auckland Rugby League competitions, namely Remuera and Sunnyside (on Auckland's north shore).

==== 1914 season ====
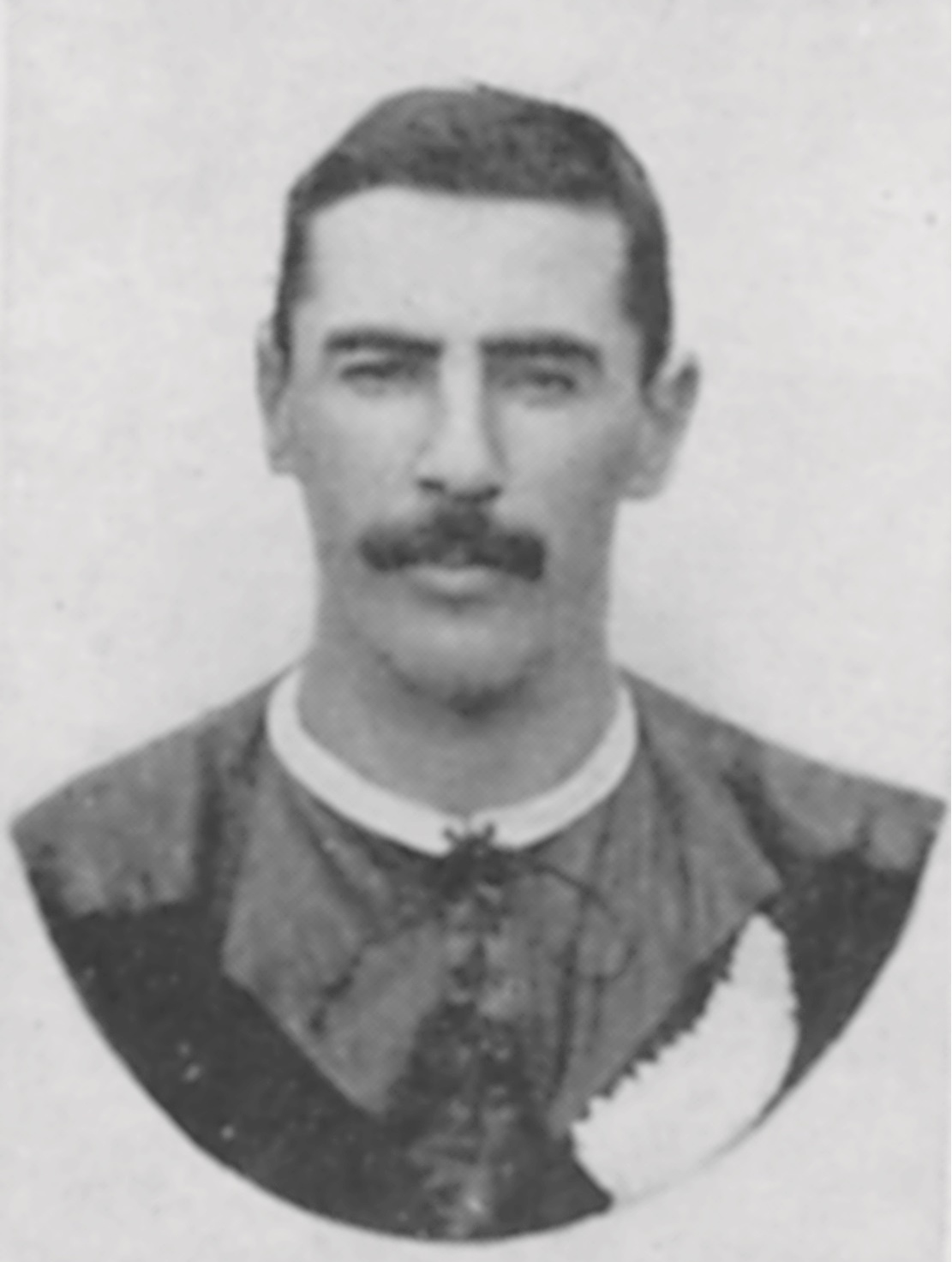
George A. Gillett

The club coach in 1914 was George A. Gillett who was given a presentation at their season ending dinner and concert. He had represented the All Blacks rugby union team from 1905 to 1908 in 38 matches including eight tests, and then the New Zealand rugby league team in 1911 in eight matches.

In the 1914 season their results were often not reported, though their fixture details were listed each week in the Auckland Star and New Zealand Herald newspapers. The first ever match day squads published were for their 6 June matches. The third grade side to play Northcote and Birkenhead Ramblers was: Badeley, Syers, Dickenson, Ballantyne, Wallace, Bennett, Smith, Tate, Ballantyne, Carter, Devine, Powdrill, Curtiss, Hyde, Hill, and Parker. While the fourth grade side to play the Newton Rangers was: Ryan, Yardley, Aickin, East, Stropin, Spratt, Bacon, Williams, Chapman, Ross, Peek, Stropin, J. Polls, Scott, Churches, and Clements. It was reported that the Remuera area would be able to provide a ground for matches.

Their third grade side performed very well, winning 11 of their 13 matches. They finished second out of the 10 teams competing behind Ponsonby United who they lost to in the final 9–0. They were attributed with 186 points for and 19 against with another score not reported. Their first ever match was won by default over North Shore A and on the same day they instead played a practice match against Northcote Ramblers which they won 8–2. They won their first official match to Hobsonville Pirates 24–0 and then lost their second 3–5 to City Rovers. Their third result against Northcote (a win) was not reported, while their fourth against Newton Rangers saw a large 37–0 win which was possibly their first ever.

Their fourth grade side won two of their eight matches that had scores reported while the competition was terminated early due to the enlistment of so many players in World War I.

At the end of the season they held their first annual dinner on Friday, 25 September at Prior's Strand Cafe. Where "there was a large attendance of members, representatives of other clubs, and supporters...". The "chairman Mr. A. Sayers presented R. Percival with a substantial cheque, the proceeds of a concert held last July for his benefit." While presentations were also made to coach Gillett, "L. Dickenson, secretary, Captain Craig, of the Remuera Fire Brigade, and Messrs. W. Sharkey, C. Bell, Wickman, and Timms."

==== 1915 season ====
Their secretary for 1915 was L. Dickenson of Oxford Street. The 1915 season saw the Remuera club field three sides in the lower grades. They were in the second grade, fourth grade, and fifth grade. The second grade side, made up of promoted third grade players again performed very well winning eight of 11 reported matches. Their fourth grade team won two matches of the five that were reported while their fifth grade side was reported to play Richmond Rovers in round 1 but no results was reported and it appears they withdrew from the competition at this point. In September they had three players selected in the Auckland Junior side to play Waikato in Huntly on 11 September. They were Tate at centre three quarter, Hume at second five eight, and Bovaird in the second row. The Auckland juniors won 16 points to 3.

Then a week later on 18 September a series of patriotic matches were played at the Devonport Domain in aid of the Waistcoat Fund. Several junior representative sides were selected from the various grades. In the Junior representatives were Tate and Hume from the Remuera second grade side, while the Fourth grade representative side featured Clemens, Chapman, and Chatwin of the Remuera fourth grade side.

==== Hiatus ====
In 1916 the club failed to field any sides and like many clubs at this time lost a huge number of players to World War I. They wrote to the Auckland Rugby League in May "intimating that it would have to withdraw on account of enlistments". Even after the wars conclusion they did not field another team again until 1927.

=== Resurrection ===
==== 1927 season ====
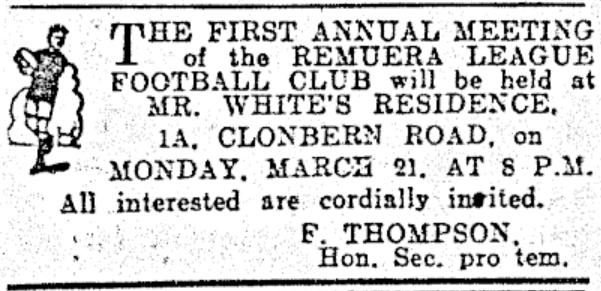
The advertisement placed for the annual 1927 meeting.

In March 1927 advertisements were published in the Auckland Star and New Zealand Herald for an annual meeting for the "First Annual Meeting of the Remuera League Football Club" at Mr. White's residence at 1A Clonbern Road for 21 March at 8pm. The honorary secretary publishing the advertisement was Frank Thompson who was a well known senior referee through the 1910s to the 1930s. A short article was published in the New Zealand Herald on 24 March which said "In 1914 two strong junior teams represented the Remuera League Club. It is intended to revive the club's activities and already several meetings have been held. During the present week a general meeting was called, and 36 enthusiasts attended. It is intended to nominate two junior teams, and the present membership is over 30. The revival of the club has been in the hands of Frank Thompson, the well known referee, and Mr. F. White and L. Dickenson, two league enthusiast. Mr. W.J. Hammill, chairman of the Management Committee of the Auckland League, addressed the gathering, and answered many questions concerning the future policy of the code." At the conclusion of the meeting the following officers were elected:- President, Dr. Pezaro; honorary secretary, Mr. G. McConnell; honorary treasurer, Mr. A. Grey; and chairman, Mr. L. Dickenson.

They fielded teams in the second grade and fourth grade. Remuera advertised a practice match to be held at the "Parnell Training Ground" on 5 April with players and intending players advised to attend at 7.30 pm, meeting at the top of St. Stephen's Avenue. Their honorary secretary was G. McConnell.

Their second grade side for their season opening match against Grafton Athletic on the Outer Domain on 7 May was published. The side was "Ross (3), Calder (2), Mitchell, Crawford, Sheddan, Ronayne, Baird, White, Robinson, McDonald, and J. Law". They ultimately finished the season in second place of 9 sides. Not all of their results were reported but they won at least 8 matches, drew 2, and lost 3, scoring 195 and conceding 57 from the 13 match results reported.

The fourth grade side which was listed the following week for their match with Richmond Rovers at Grey Lynn Park was "Wilson (2), Smith, Ball, Turner, Taylor, Soloman, Harford, Marshall, Weston, Walker, Turley, Massay, Simins, Wright, Noonan, and Benton". Though they ultimately defaulted the match. They played 13 matches but only had the results reported for 8 of them which featured 2 draws and 6 losses. They finished approximately 5th of the 7 competing sides.

On 22 July it was reported that the Auckland Rugby League had acquired the sole use of the ground in Pine Street at the "rear of the Remuera school". The ground was "discovered" by representatives of sports bodies who had been taken on an inspection as guests of the council parks committee. The council then granted the use of the field to rugby league. The following week on 30 July both the second and fourth grade Remuera sides played their matches there against Devonport United at 3pm and Ponsonby United B at 2pm respectively. The ground is probably present day Platina Reserve which is in that exact location. The second grade side lost to Devonport 12 to 8 while the fourth grade side drew 3–3 with Ponsonby.

===== Representative selections =====
On 9 July a trial match was played to select the Auckland Junior representative side at Carlaw Park. The Remuera players selected were Ronayne, Bird, K. Ross, Ross, Crawford, Harlford and Ghent. The A Team won the match 5 to 3 with Bird converting a try in his sides win.

On 29 August an Auckland junior representative squad was selected to play in Rotorua on 3 September. Ronayne and D. Ross was chosen from the Remuera second grade side.

In October an Auckland junior representative squad was selected to play the Frankton juniors from the Waikato area. Bissett and Clarke were chosen from the Remuera side.

==== 1928 season ====
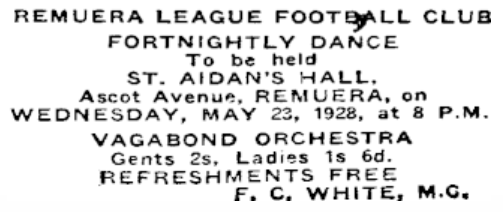

They held their annual general meeting on 7 March at 7.30 at St. Aidan's Hall in Remuera. Mr. G. McConnell was their honorary secretary. On 28 April they held a practice for all grades at the Remuera ground. The 1928 season saw Remuera field sides in the second grade, third grade intermediate which was a weighted grade limited to 10st 7 lb (66.7 kg), and the fourth grade. They published advertisements in the newspaper to attract more players into the 3rd grade intermediate side.

They continued to hold fortnightly dances at the St. Aidan's Hall on Ascot Avenue in Remuera.

On 30 September their fourth grade side played a match at Carlaw Park against the Hikurangi Juniors which was made up of players from Kamo, Onerahi, and Portland. The match was a curtain raiser to the Newton Rangers – Ponsonby United Roope Rooster semi final. Remuera won the match 10 points to 6 with Ormsby scoring one of their two tries and Bird converting both of them.

The second grade side finished runner up to Devonport United along with Ponsonby and Newton, while their fourth grade side also finished runner up, 2 points behind Richmond Rovers.

==== 1929 season ====
Their 1929 annual meeting was held on 11 March at Mr. White's residence at 1a on Clonburn Road in Remuera. There were 35 members in attendance with Mr. A. Beeston presiding over it. It was reported that the club had a credit balance of £17. The elected officers were : "Patron, Mr. Lewis; president, Dr. Pezaro; secretary, G. McConnell; treasurer, J. Marr; delegate, J. Mc. A. Stanley; club captain, D. Ross; auditors, L. Dickenson, R. Miller, all re-elected; Management Committee, R. Jenkins, R. Millar, Looker, Thompson, Davenport, Walker, W. Ross, Mound; selectors for first match, R. Jenkins, D. Ross, and W. Ross". It was said that "fifteen new members were enrolled on the club's playing books, and strong teams will be entered in various grades". Ultimately Remuera fielded two teams, which were in the second and fourth grades.

Rugby league was provisionally given the use of one ground at the Remuera school reserve however this changed prior to the start of the season as all the winter sport bodies struggled to be allocated sufficient space to play.

Their first listed side for the season in the second grade competitions was to play Devonport United and was: Davenport, McCullum, Massay, Mitchell, Mound, Harford (2), Emson (2), Calder, Looker, Thompson, Henderson, Roach, Loomb, Vaile, Ghent, K. Sheddon, and Ross. While their fourth grade side to play Mount Wellington was Wilson (2), Keer, Regan, Ball, Wickman, Marshall, Bird, Cato, Walker, Kellett, Smith, Marchington, Hosking, and Foss.

In mid July the fourth grade side defaulted their match with Kingsland Athletic which was an indication of playing number issues. They dropped out of the competition despite having been competitive with a 4 win, 1 draw, 4 loss record, scoring 69 points and conceding just 21 prior to this point.

In July an Auckland junior representative side was chosen to play their South Auckland (Waikato) counterparts at Carlaw Park. The team featured one Remuera player initially, K. Sheddon. When the match day side was eventually named K. Sheddon was named as a reserve. Sheddon was then chosen in the squad to travel to Huntly to play Waikato on 31 August.

The second grade team finished in 5th position out of 7 with a 3 win, 9 loss record, scoring 38 points and conceding 103. The 5th grade side finished 6th of 10 teams, winning 4 of their 11 matches and drawing 1 other.

At the conclusion of the season the club ceased to exist fielding no teams in 1930.

== Records ==
=== Senior team record ===
The season record for the most senior men's team in the club.

Season	Grade	Pld	W	D	L	PF	PA	PD	Pts	Position (Teams)
1914	3rd Grade	13	11	0	2	186	19	+167	18	2nd (of 10)
1915	2nd Grade	11	8	0	3	111	33	+78	16	2nd (of 8)
1927	2nd Grade	14	8	2	3	195	57	+138	18	2nd (of 9)
1928	2nd Grade	12	6	0	5	141	87	+54	12	2nd (of 6)
1929	2nd Grade	12	3	0	9	38	103	-65	6	5th (of 7)
1914–15 & 1927–29	TOTAL	62	36	3	22	671	299	+372	70	

=== Other team records ===
Season	Grade	Pld	W	D	L	PF	PA	PD	Pts	Position (Teams)
1914	4th Grade	9	4	0	5	31	43	-12	8	5th (of 12)
1915	4th Grade	5	2	0	3	44	36	+8	4	6th (of 10)
1927	4th Grade	13	0	2	6	13	143	-130	2	5th (of 7)
1928	3rd Grade Intermediate	8	0	0	7	6	105	-99	0	9th (of 10)
1928	4th Grade (Hospital Cup)	15	10	1	2	129	42	+87	21	2nd (of 10)
1929	2nd Grade	12	3	0	9	2	38	103	6	5th (of 7)
1929	4th Grade (Hospital Cup)	11	4	1	6	69	19	+50	9	6th (of 10)
