= Karl Ifwersen =

NZ dual-code rugby international footballer

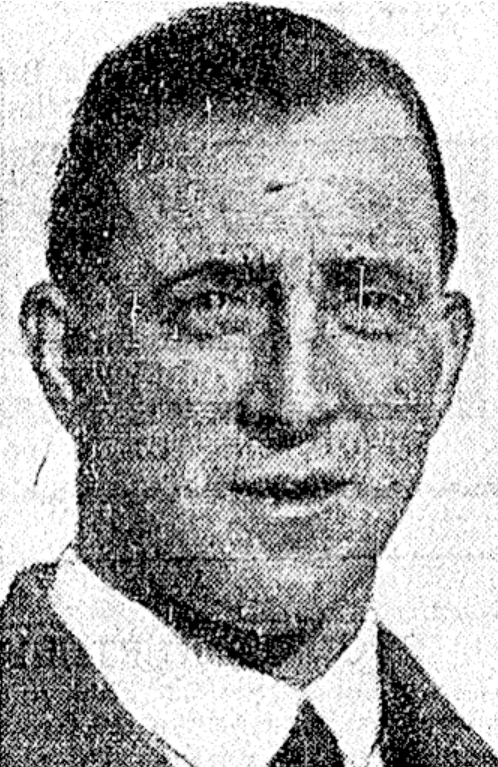
- Full name: Karl Donald Ifwersen
- Born: 6 January 1893 Auckland, New Zealand
- Died: 19 May 1967 (aged 74) Devonport, Auckland, New Zealand
- Height: 178 cm (5 ft 10 in)
- Weight: 76 kg (12 st 0 lb)

Rugby union career
- Position: Second five eighth
Senior career
Years	Team	Apps	(Points)
1910-11	Grafton	4	(0)
1912	College Rifles	10	(27)
1921-24	Grammar	34	(137)
1928-29	City (Auckland)	18	(42)
1929	Thames Valley Power Board	1	(9)
1930	City (Te Aroha)	3	(0)
International career
Years	Team	Apps	(Points)
1910-11	AKL Juniors	3	(20)
1910	(Military) Volunteer Union	1	(3)
1912-24	Auckland	37	(193)
1921	New Zealand	1	(0)
1924	AKL Combined	1	(5)
1924	Auckland XV	1	(5)
1929	Piako	6	(17)
- Rugby league career

Playing information
- Position: Wing, Centre
Club
Years	Team	Pld	T	G	FG	P
1913	North Shore Albions	4	3	3	0	15
1914–20	Grafton Athletic	48	34	79	0	260
	Total	52	37	82	0	275
Representative
Years	Team	Pld	T	G	FG	P
1913–20	Auckland	11	13	14	0	67
1913–20	New Zealand	26	21	63	0	189
1918	Auckland Trial	1	1	1	0	5

Coaching information
Club
Years	Team	Gms	W	D	L	W%
1925	North Shore	15	10	0	5	67
1927–29	City	47	25	3	19	53
1933	City (Whangarei)	12	5	1	6	42
1934–36	Old Boys juniors (Whangarei)
1935–38	North Auckland	13	2	0	11	15
1938	Old Boys (Whangarei)	14	10	1	3	71
	Total	101	52	5	44	51

Karl Donald Ifwersen (1893–1967) was a New Zealand rugby football player who represented New Zealand in both rugby league and rugby union.

== Early years ==
Karl Donald Ifwersen was born on 6 January in Auckland, New Zealand. His parents were Charles Ernest Ifwersen (1868–1910), and Margaret Marion Bedell (1869–1944). He had 6 siblings; Margaret Zeka Ifwersen (1894–1944), Roy Ifwersen (1896–1940), Doris Norma Ifwersen (1899–1989), Esme Ifwersen (1901–1937), Alfred Neil Sinclair Ifwersen (1904–1963), and Mary Clyde Ifwersen (1907–1988). His brother Roy was also an accomplished senior rugby player who played with Karl at times.

Ifwersen attended both St John's College and Auckland Grammar. He originally played for North Shore as a junior before moving to the new College Rifles rugby union club and was instrumental in helping the team win back-to-back junior championships in their first two years in ARFU competition. He played in 2 senior matches in the 1910 season for the Grafton seniors (as College Rifles only had a second grade side) and impressed with the New Zealand Herald saying in July 1910 that he was one of the most promising juniors in Auckland. In 1911 the City senior side asked to play him but were not allowed by the ARU as it was past the 1 July deadline for the transfer of players. During that same season he scored 100 points for the College Rifles second grade side. Later in the season he also played 2 more matches for the Grafton senior side. In an Auckland junior match against Waiuku on 22 September he scored 4 tries in an easy win. In 1912 College Rifles were promoted to the first grade and he played in 10 matches for them. He was selected for his Auckland debut against the South Island on 20 July and played in the five eights positions. Ifwersen kicked 3 conversions in a 29–3 win. In total he represented Auckland in 8 provincial matches that season, scoring 3 tries, kicking 4 conversions and a penalty for 20 points.

== Rugby league career ==
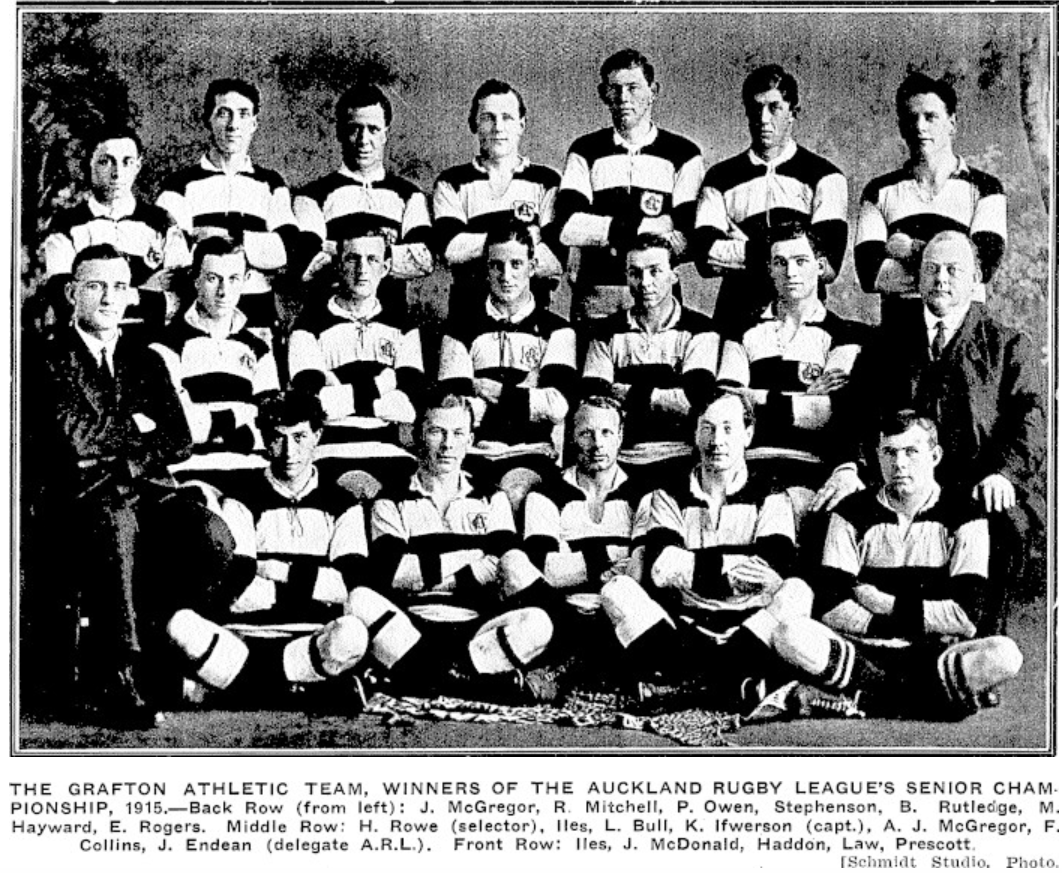
The 1915 champion Grafton Athletic team captained by Ifwersen.

Ifwersen then switched codes to rugby league, joining the North Shore Albions where he debuted for them on 3 May 1913. He scored a try in a 13–10 win over the reigning champions Newton Rangers. He played for Auckland before representing his club and made the 1913 New Zealand tour of Australia. The following year he joined the newly formed Grafton Athletic senior team. He performed outstandingly for them and led the competition in scoring in 1914 with 66 points and in 1915 with 78 points which greatly assisted Grafton in winning their first ever championship. Indeed, he scored 146 of their 193 points in those two seasons. In the 1916 season he once again led the league in scoring with 56 points however the 1917 season was to be a frustrating one with his Grafton team struggling for playing numbers and they were forced to default matches before dropping out of the competition. In 1918 though he again was prolific, scoring 4 tries, and kicking 27 goals for 66 points to lead the league in scoring for a remarkable 5th season out of six. He also represented Auckland in their first match in a number of years and he scored 2 tries and kicked 4 goals in a 45–9 win over Canterbury in front of 10,000 spectators at the Auckland Domain.

== World War ==
Ifwersen was part of the advance to Samoa at the start of the war before rejoining Grafton for the 1915 season. He joined the twenty-eighth draft which mobilised for camp on 10 April 1917. He travelled with the 3rd Auckland Mounted Rifles for Egypt where he also played for the New Zealand Army team. He did not spend a large amount of time abroad as he was frequently in Auckland playing for Grafton throughout the war and his war record like most others who served during World War I is lacking in specific details.

== Return to league ==
Despite serving in the armed forces Ifwersen still managed to turn out for Grafton at stages in every year of the war. He made the New Zealand side again after the conclusion of the war when representative matches resumed. He captained the Kiwis in 4 matches in 1919 and again against the 1920 Great Britain tourists.

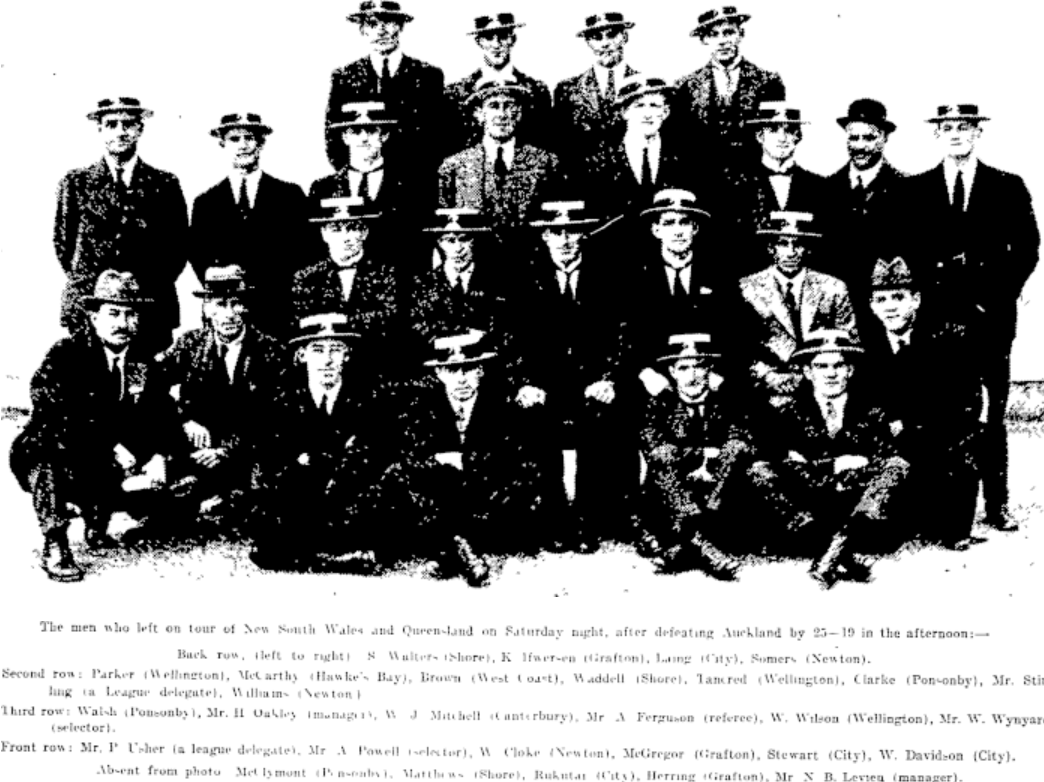
The 1919 New Zealand team to tour New South Wales and Queensland. Karl Ifwersen is in the back row, second from the left.

== Rugby union career ==
In 1921 Ifwersen switched codes, playing rugby union. He immediately returned to the rep team, captaining the combined Auckland-North Auckland side against South Africa in his first game back and scoring the only try.

Ifwersen played in one test match for the All Blacks during the 1921 South Africa tour of the country. At some point after this the New Zealand Rugby Union decided that reinstated players could not represent New Zealand again and although Ifwersen was eligible to play for Auckland he could not gain higher honours again. In 1922 he played 9 matches for Grammar, scoring 24 points and captained Auckland in 8 games, scoring 57 points from 6 tries, 15 conversions, and 3 penalties. The following season in 1923 he scored 40 points for Grammar through 9 games, and again captained Auckland in 9 games. He scored 2 tries and kicked 23 conversions and 4 penalties for a haul of 64 points. In 1924 his playing in the All Black trial caused considerable controversy with the rugby union seeking to know why he had been allowed to take the field. He had not been named in the original side but had gone on to replace an injured player .

Ifwersen continued to play for Auckland between 1921 and 1924 and later moved into coaching the North Shore club in the 1920s and also 3 years with North Auckland in the 1930s.

== Coaching and selecting ==
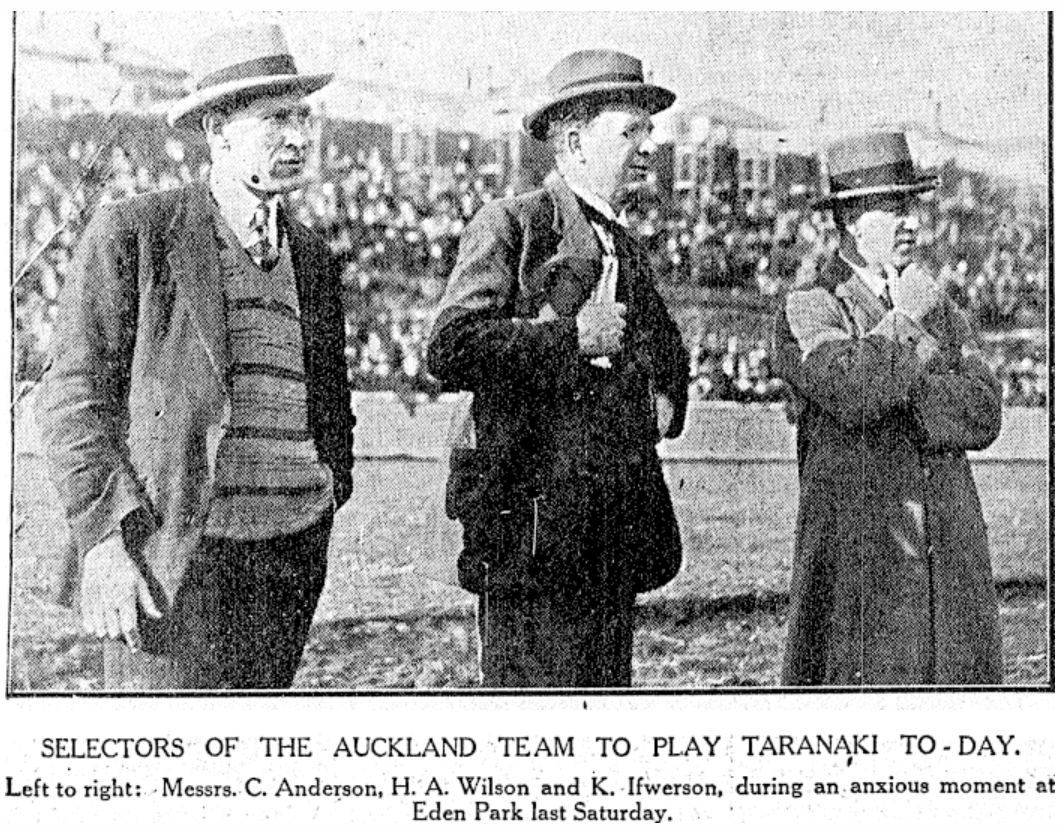

After retiring from the playing field Ifwersen began coaching the North Shore first grade side in 1925. They played in the B Division and won the championship with an unbeaten 9–0 record. They then played 6 matches in the Pollard Cup and lost 4 close matches to A Division teams before a win over Suburbs, and a default loss to Grafton to finish the season with a 10–5 record. In 1926 he continued to coach North Shore and was also appointed an Auckland representative selector. He also served as manager of the Auckland side in the 1926 season. In 1928 he took charge of the newly promoted City first grade side who were playing in the A Grade. They performed well and finished mid table. On 7 July he came out of retirement and played against North Shore in a 11–3 win where he kicked a conversion. He played 5 more matches before injuring his ankle in a 7–6 win over Ponsonby on 8 August. City finished the season with an 8 win, 11 loss record. In 1929 he again returned to the field, playing 12 more matches for City.

== Piako and Thames ==
Towards the end of the 1929 season Karl and his brother Neil moved to Piako where they played several matches for the side there against Franklin, Waihi (x2), Hauraki Plains, Matamata, and Waikato. He scored 3 tries, 1 conversion, and 1 penalty. On 12 October he played in a match for the Thames Valley Power Board against New Zealand Railway and he kicked a penalty, conversion, and drop goal.

== Move to Northland and North Auckland coaching and selecting ==
In 1933 Ifwersen moved to live in Whangarei. He took on several coaching opportunities over the following years. In 1933 it was reported that he was coaching the City senior side, who finished the season with a 5 win, 1 draw, 6 loss record. In 1934 he took on the responsibility of coaching the (Whangarei) Old Boy junior side. He was to train them for several seasons before taking over the senior side in 1938.

In the same 1935 season he was elected as the Mangonui delegate to the North Auckland rugby union, and he was subsequently chosen as a North Auckland representative selector and he also coached the side along with former All Black Innes Finlayson. North Auckland played 2 matches, losing both to Auckland. The first was in Whangarei (5-21), while the second was in Auckland and was for the Ranfurly Shield. Auckland proved too strong, winning 21–5.

In 1936 he selected the representative side along with W Kelly, and D Stewart. Ifwersen then accompanied the side on their southern tour. They went winless in their 6 matches which included 4 in the South Island, which was the first time a team from North Auckland had played there. The tour saw losses to Thames Valley 13–19, Auckland 9–16, Ashburton 9–10, South Canterbury 6-21, Otago 0-30 (Ranfurly Shield challenge), and Canterbury 9-43. Their results were put down to a lack of effort by the players in the Northland region in terms of training and commitment to the sport.

The 1937 season saw Ifwersen secure his first win as North Auckland coach when they defeated Thames Valley 23–9 at Mangaturoto on 23 September. They lost to Auckland at Dargaville 6-3 and later they had the honour of hosting South Africa for their final tour match of New Zealand. North Auckland put up a very good showing in poor conditions to only lose the match 14–6.

He was appointed sole selector of North Auckland once again in 1938 and also began coaching the Old Boys clubs senior side. He also coached the North Auckland side in their 12–11 loss to Auckland at Eden Park on 23 July, and again in their 13–10 win over Waikato in Whangarei.

He left the area at the end of 1938.

== Personal life ==
Ifwersen married three times. His first wife was Olga Elizabeth Phillips (1901–1998), before separating and marrying Linda Lewis Flood Brookes (1904-). He had a daughter with Linda, Marie Jos'e Ifwersen (1928–1990), before separating from her and marrying Katherena Cecilia Imedla Anderson (1894–1954). Ifwersen died in Auckland on 19 May 1967 aged 74. He was buried at Purewa Cemetery, Meadowbank, Auckland, New Zealand.

== Legacy ==
Ifwersen was inducted into the New Zealand Rugby League's Legends of League in 2000. He was the first New Zealander to represent New Zealand in rugby league before rugby union. This accomplishment would be unmatched until almost 90 years later by Sonny Bill Williams.
