= Grafton Athletic =

Defunct NZ rugby league club, based in Auckland

Club information
- Full name: Grafton Athletic Football Club
- Colours: Black and White
- Founded: 1914
- Exited: 1922

Former details
- Ground(s): Victoria Park; Auckland Domain; Carlaw Park
- Captain: Karl Ifwersen
- Competition: Auckland Rugby League

Records
- Premierships: 1915
- Minor premierships: 1915

Grafton Athletic was a rugby league club in Auckland. They competed in the Auckland Rugby League competition from 1914 to 1920 as Grafton Athletic, and as Fire Brigade in 1921–22 before they folded.

== Club history ==
=== Formation ===
Grafton were formed to compete in the 1914 Auckland Rugby League season. Their first ever annual meeting was held on March 27 of that year. Its first president was Mr. John Endean and international Karl Ifwersen was on its committee as well as being its star player in its early years. They wore black and white uniforms. Ifwersen was said to be instrumental in the forming of the club. He had played for North Shore Albions the previous season after switching from rugby to league. The NZ Herald indeed stated "Ifwersen has been very busy for some time past organising the Grafton Club, which he formed practically by himself, and of which he is now the energetic secretary". Like many of the clubs at the time they did not have their own ground per se and played the majority of their matches at Victoria Park with some at the Auckland Domain before the creation of Carlaw Park as the headquarters of Auckland Rugby League.

== Playing record and lone title ==
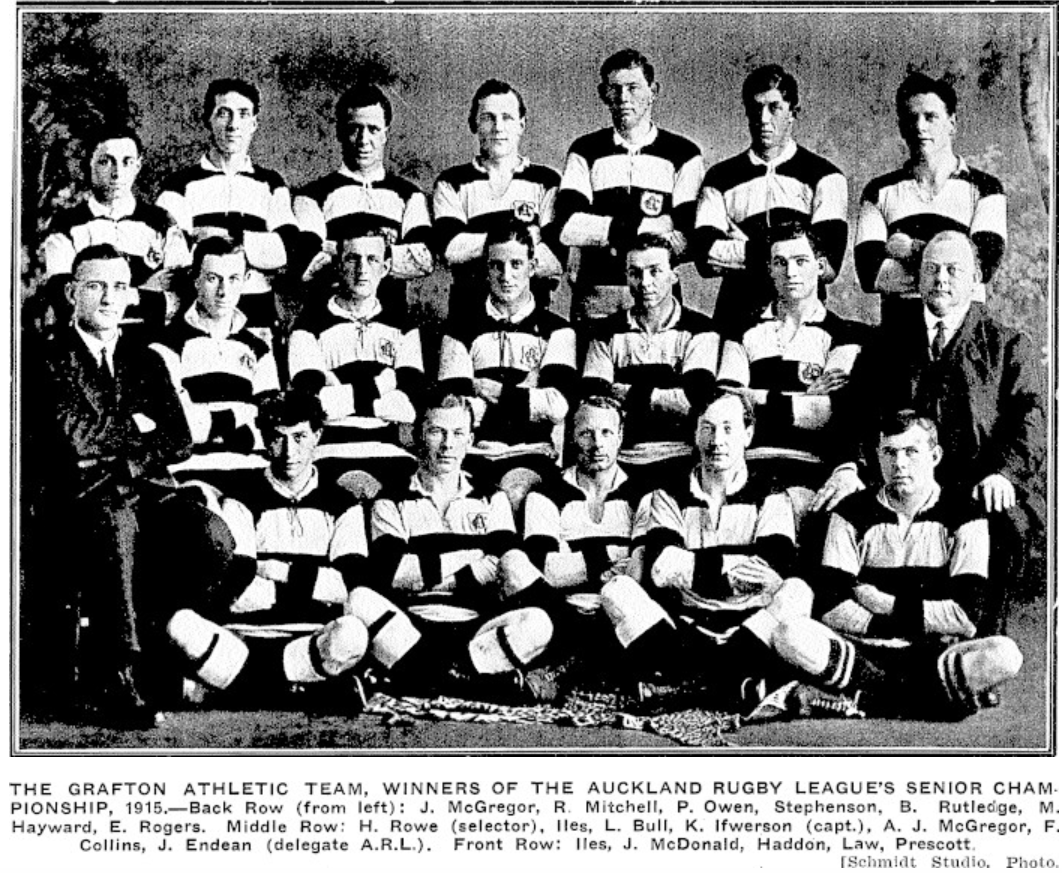

In their first season (1914) they came 4th with a 3 win and 6 loss record. That same season they also fielded a side in the second grade who finished towards the bottom of the table, and 2 sides in the fourth grade who also finished down the table.

In 1915 they won the senior championship with a 7 win, 1 draw, and 2 loss record. They defeated City Rovers in the final 10 points to 5 in front of 4000 spectators at Victoria Park. They were led by the talented Karl Ifwersen who was the competition's top point scorer and Dougie McGregor. George Iles who later went on to play for New Zealand also played for Grafton in this 1915 season. Bob Mitchell played with them from 1914 to 1919 after transferring from City Rovers during the 1914 season. Tom Haddon also joined the side in their inaugural season and was part of the committee and selection committee. He played 2 seasons before departing for the war. Ifwersen top scored in the senior competition in the 1914, 15, and 16 seasons. The 1915 win was to be their only title.

In the 1915 season they also fielded a handful of junior teams. Their second grade side finished last, their fourth grade team withdrew after 2 weeks, though this was not uncommon in the war years due to many players enlisting in the military. Their fifth grade side also struggled though they improved later in the season registering a win over Manukau, and a draw with North Shore Albions.

Ernie Herring transferred from rugby in 1919 and was to play for them for two seasons before departing for the Maritime club. Another Kiwi, Charles Woolley also spent three years playing for them from 1920 to 1922 and was their captain in the last two years. In the remainder of the decade they struggled to be competitive and some years defaulted matches. In 1921 they asked for permission to change their name to "Fire Brigade Club". They did not fare any better under their new name and finished last with a 1 win and 7 loss record in 1921 and again came last in 1922. Bill Te Whata switched codes and moved to Auckland joining the club however he only played 3 matches as he spent much of the season playing in representative matches including the New Zealand Māori tour of Australia where he played 9 matches. Along with Te Whata, George Gardiner, R Pitman, and Moses Yates also joined the side from the returning Māori touring team. This was to be the last year that the Grafton Athletic/Fire Brigade club played.

In the mid 1920s the Maritime club which had changed its name to Athletic took on the name 'Grafton Athletic' before they eventually amalgamated with Kingsland, and then they later amalgamated with Marist Old Boys and ceased to exist as a stand-alone club.

The Grafton Athletic/Fire Brigade club finished after 9 seasons in the first grade competition with a 22 win, 2 draw, 59 loss all-time record, scoring 715 points and conceding 1,334.

=== Myers Cup/Monteith Shield (first grade championship) ===
Season	Name	Pld	W	D	L	PF	PA	PD	Pts	Position (Teams)
1914	Grafton Athletic	9	3	0	6	75	115	-40	6	Fourth (Six)
1915	Grafton Athletic	10	7	1	2	118	70	+48	15	First (Six)
1916	Grafton Athletic	10	5	0	5	101	85	+16	10	Third (Six)
1917	Grafton Athletic	7	0	0	7*	21	144	-123	0	Fifth (Six) (1 lost by default)
1918	Grafton Athletic	8	2	0	6	94	125	-31	4	Fourth (Six)
1919	Grafton Athletic	6	1	0	5	36	75	-39	2	Sixth (Eight)
1920	Grafton Athletic	11	1	0	10**	78	228	-150	2	Seventh (Seven) (2 lost by default)
1921	Fire Brigade	8	1	0	7	41	179	-138	2	Seventh (Seven)
1922	Fire Brigade	14	2	1	11	143	313	-170	5	Eighth (Eight)
1914-22	Total	83	22	2	59	708	1334	-627	46	N/A

=== Roope Rooster record ===
Season	Name	Pld	W	D	L	PF	PA	PD	Pts	Position (Teams)
1915	Grafton Athletic	3	1	1	1	28	28	0	N/A	Lost in 2nd semi final to North Shore
1916	Grafton Athletic	1	0	0	1	0	0	0	N/A	Defaulted to City Rovers in R1
1917	Grafton Athletic	0	0	0	0	0	0	0	N/A	Did not compete
1918	Grafton Athletic	1	0	0	1	11	16	-5	N/A	Lost to Maritime 16-11 in R1.
1919	Grafton Athletic	0	0	0	0	0	0	0	N/A	Did not compete
1920	Grafton Athletic	1	0	0	1	3	14	-9	N/A	Lost to City Rovers in R1 14-3.
1921	Fire Brigade	1	0	0	1	7	12	-5	N/A	Lost in the semi-final to Maritime 12-7.
1922	Fire Brigade	1	0	0	1	12	15	-3	N/A	Lost to Athletic 15-12 in R1
1914-22	Total	8	1	1	6	61	85	-24	N/A	N/A

== Representative players ==
=== New Zealand ===
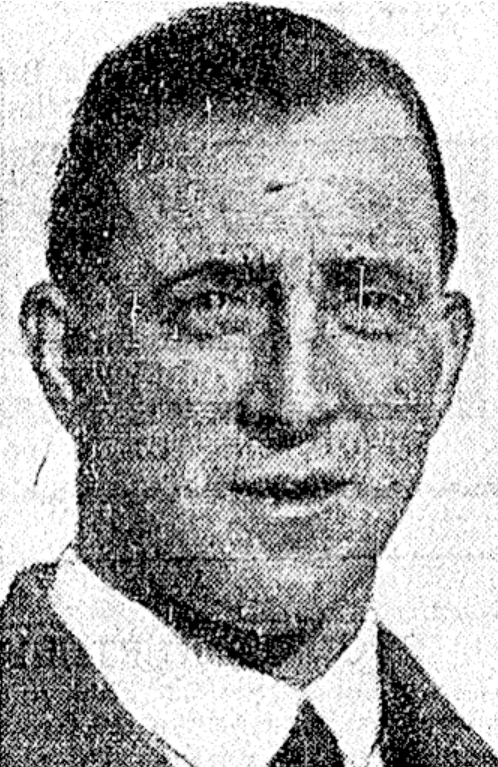
Karl Ifwersen

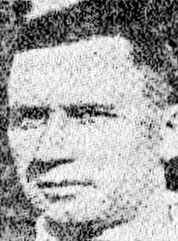
Ernie Herring

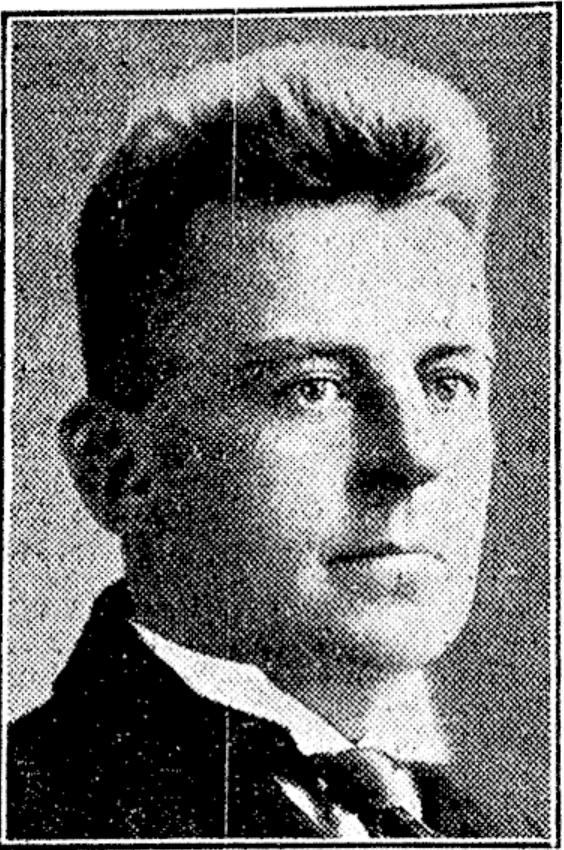
Charles Woolley

- Bob Mitchell 1914 (1)
- Karl Ifwersen 1914-20 (16)
- Ernie Herring 1919-20 (6)
- Dougie McGregor 1919 (9)
- Charles Woolley 1920-21 (9)
- Joe Bennett 1920 (2)

=== Auckland ===
- F Rogers 1915 (1)
- Dougie McGregor 1915-19 (3)
- F Collins 1915 (1)
- John McGregor 1915 (1)
- Karl Ifwersen 1918-20 (1)
- Ernie Bailey 1918 (1)
- Ernie Herring 1918-22 (4)
- Bob Mitchell 1919 (4)
- A Pullen 1919 (1)
- Billy Ghent 1919 (1)
- Charles Woolley 1920-22 (9)
- Joe Bennett 1920 (1)
- R Coates 1921 (2)
- E Elliott 1921 (2)
- Brady 1921 (1)
- Mackie 1922 (1)

=== New Zealand Māori ===
- George Gardiner
- R Pitman
- Bill Te Whata (9)
- Moses Yates

=== Auckland Province ===
- Bill Te Whata (1)

=== Australasia ===
- Bill Te Whata (2)

George Iles also played for Grafton Athletic from 1914 to 1915 but did not represent Auckland or New Zealand in that time. While Horace Neal also played for the club briefly in 1920, the year after his lone appearance for New Zealand. Tom Haddon played for Grafton in 1914 and 1915 before leaving for World War 1. When he returned from the war he joined the City Rovers club and made the New Zealand side in 1919. William Johnston also made one controversial appearance for Grafton in 1920. Maritime protested his appearance claiming he was not registered but as he had returned from England in 1914 (where he had played with Wigan and Warrington) the Auckland Rugby League was satisfied that he was not registered with any other club.

== All time top point scorers (1914-1922) ==
The point scoring lists are compiled from matches played in matches from the first grade championship, the Roope Rooster and Phelan Shield. One off matches and exhibition matches are not included.

Top point scorers
No	Player	Start	End	Games	Tries	Con	Pen	DG	Mark	Pts
1	Karl Ifwersen	1914	1920	48	34	33	46	0	4	260
2	J Wareing	1921	1922	18	7	7	11	0	0	57
3	Dougie McGregor	1915	1919	27	8	3	2	0	0	34
4	John McGregor	1915	1917	23	8	1	0	0	0	26
5	Charles Woolley	1920	1922	21	4	4	2	0	0	24
6	John (Jack) Woolley	1921	1922	17	6	2	0	0	0	22
7	J Henderson	1922	-	9	4	2	1	0	0	18
8	H Simpson	1918	1919	8	5	0	0	0	0	15
9=	R or W.J. Coates	1921	1922	13	4	1	0	0	0	14
9=	F Collins	1915	1920	18	4	1	0	0	0	14
11	P or E.C. Owen	1914	1920	21	3	0	1	0	1	13
12	Tremain	1918	-	6	4	0	0	0	0	12
13=	P Brady	1920	1922	19	3	1	0	0	0	11
13=	George Cargill	1921	-	13	3	1	0	0	0	11
13=	Ronald Lovett	1922	-	11	3	0	1	0	0	11

== Head to Head records ==
Top point scorers
Opponent	Start	End	Games	Wins	Draws	Losses	For	Against
Newton Rangers	1914	1922	16	4	1	11	137	232
North Shore Albions	1914	1922	15	2	1	12	85	165
Ponsonby United	1914	1922	16	5	0	11	118	233
City Rovers	1914	1922	16	5	0	11	114	382
Maritime	1918	1922	11	4	0	7	123	194
Otahuhu Rovers	1914	1916	6	4	0	2	76	30
Marist Old Boys	1919	1922	6	1	1	4	64	104
Richmond Rovers	1922	1922	2	1	0	1	18	23
TOTAL	1914	1922	88	26	3	59	735	1363
