= Hobsonville Pirates =

Defunct NZ rugby league club, based in Auckland

Club information
- Full name: Hobsonville Pirates
- Founded: 1912
- Exited: 1915; 110 years ago

Former details
- Ground(s): Hobsonville; Midgley’s Paddock
- Competition: Auckland Rugby League

The Hobsonville Pirates were a rugby league club which existed briefly from 1912 to 1914 and competed in the Auckland Rugby League competitions in the 2nd and 3rd grade. They were based in Hobsonville in West Auckland, New Zealand.

== History ==
=== Founding ===
There were rumours in mid to late April that a rugby league club was going to be formed in the Hobsonville area at the first meeting of the Auckland Rugby League management committee in 1912. The Hobsonville Pirates rugby league club was officially formed in May, 1912. It was said that “a largely attended meeting was held … for the purpose of forming a football club, Mr. J. S. Wilson being in the chair”. They decided to enter a team in the second grade of the Auckland Rugby League competition which had been running since 1910 after the organisation itself was formed the year prior. The club elected the following officers on to its committee:- President, Mr. Alex Harris, M.P. who had been recently elected as a minister of parliament, vice presidents, Messrs. James Sims Ockleston, T. Hunter; captain, Mr. E. Saxon; vice captain, Mr. J.C. Adams; and hon. secretary, Mr. T.E. Clark. They then settled on the name of ‘Hobsonville Pirates’.

=== 1912 second grade ===
In their first season their results were rarely reported, though their fixture details were listed each week in the Auckland Star and New Zealand Herald. Their first ever game was against North Shore Albions on May 11 and they suffered a 13–0 defeat at Hobsonville though it is unknown specifically where the ground they played at was. Teams would have to catch the launch (Elsie) from the "Harbour Board" steps to reach the ground. Their first ever team was listed in the New Zealand Herald as: Lindsay, W Williamson, S. Wiseley, S Hutchinson, T.E. Clark, J. Adams, J. Williamson, E. Saxon, Te Ruby, J. Denny, Alderton, G. Clark, and E. Briggs, with the emergency players named as J. Brown, G Bennett, and C Nicklin. For North Shore Woodward scored 2 tries, Seagar 1, and Nicholson converted 2 of them. It was described as a "fast, interesting game". A few other results were reported which were also losses but after 7 rounds the table was reported and they had won one match and lost 6 to that point. Their win had come over the win less Newton Rangers on May 25. The match was played “in one of Mr. Midgley’s paddocks”. On June 22 they played a match against Ellerslie United at Eden Park on the number 3 field in a season where rugby league had use of the ground. They lost by 9 points to 3. Following their match at Hobsonville with Northcote & Birkenhead Ramblers on July 6, player R. Heron was suspended by the Auckland Rugby League "until such time that he appear before the Auckland League". Hobsonville had one player (Wilson) selected for an Auckland junior trial match between A and B sides on July 27. The match was a curtain raiser to Auckland v Hawke's Bay.

=== 1913 season ===
In 1913 the club failed to field any teams in either the second, third, or fourth grade competitions.

=== 1914 third grade revival ===
In 1914 Hobsonville fielded a team in the 3rd grade competition. On May 16 in their opening game of the season the Remuera side defaulted, handing them a win. Then in their next match on May 30 they defeated Sunnyside B by 6 points to 3. Very few results were reported during the season and it appears that they only played intermittently. After 5 weeks of the competition they had only recorded 1 win scoring 36 points and conceding 74 to that point.

=== Disestablishment ===
The 1915 season was to be short lived. They had elected E. Frelan as their secretary but they were unable to field any teams and the club folded soon after. It was reported in the Observer newspaper that “J. Frelan, who will be remembered as secretary of Hobsonville last year, was granted a transfer to Thames Old Boys. His old club is not reforming.

== Team records ==
The season record for the most senior men’s team in the club.

Season	Grade	Name	Played	W	D	L	PF	PA	PD	Pts	Position (Teams)
1912	2nd Grade	Hobsonville Pirates	7	1	0	6	18	57	-39	2	7th of 8
1913		No teams fielded									
1914	3rd Grade	Hobsonville Pirates	5	1	0	4	36	74	+27	4	4th of 10
1912-14	TOTAL		12	2	0	10	54	131	-77	4	
