= Charles Woolley (rugby league) =

New Zealand international rugby league player

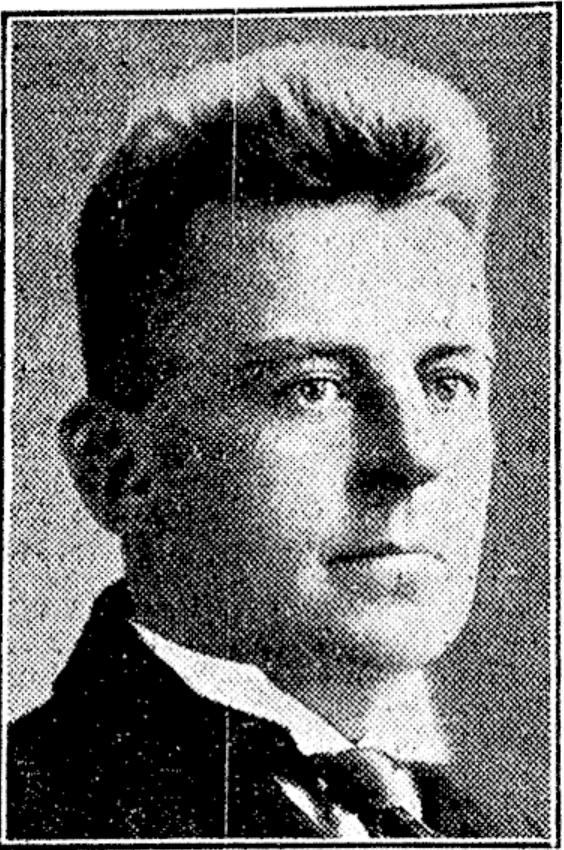

Personal information
- Full name: Charles Alexander Woolley
- Born: 7 May 1893 Adelaide, South Australia, Australia
- Died: 1 November 1966 (aged 73) Rotorua, New Zealand

Playing information
- Height: 163 cm (5 ft 4 in)
- Weight: 91 kg (14 st 5 lb)

Rugby league
- Position: Wing, Centre
Club
Years	Team	Pld	T	G	FG	P
1914–15	City Rovers	10	2	0	0	6
1920–22	Grafton Athletic/Fire Brigade	26	5	7	0	29
	Total	36	7	7	0	35
Representative
Years	Team	Pld	T	G	FG	P
1920–22	Auckland	9	3	0	0	9
1920–21	New Zealand	3	0	0	0	0

Rugby union
Club
Years	Team	Pld	T	G	FG	P
1919	Grammar Old Boys	7	3	0	0	9
Representative
Years	Team	Pld	T	G	FG	P
1919	Auckland	4	3	0	0	9
1919	Returned Soldiers	1	0	0	0	0

Charles Alexander Woolley is a New Zealand international rugby league footballer who represented New Zealand.

== Background ==
Woolley was born in Adelaide, South Australia. He worked for the Fire Brigade in Auckland and in 1922 was awarded service bars for 15 years service at the City Fire Brigade's annual social.

== Playing career ==
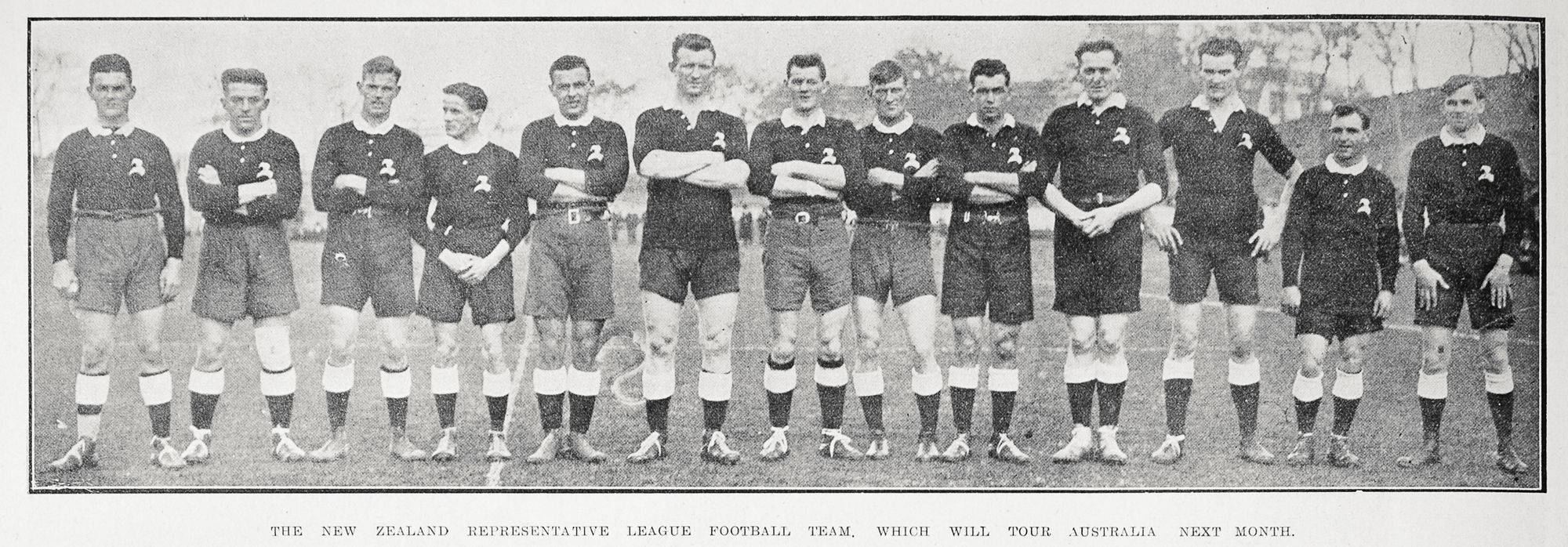
Woolley 2nd from the left in the 'New Zealand' team to play Auckland on May 21, 1921

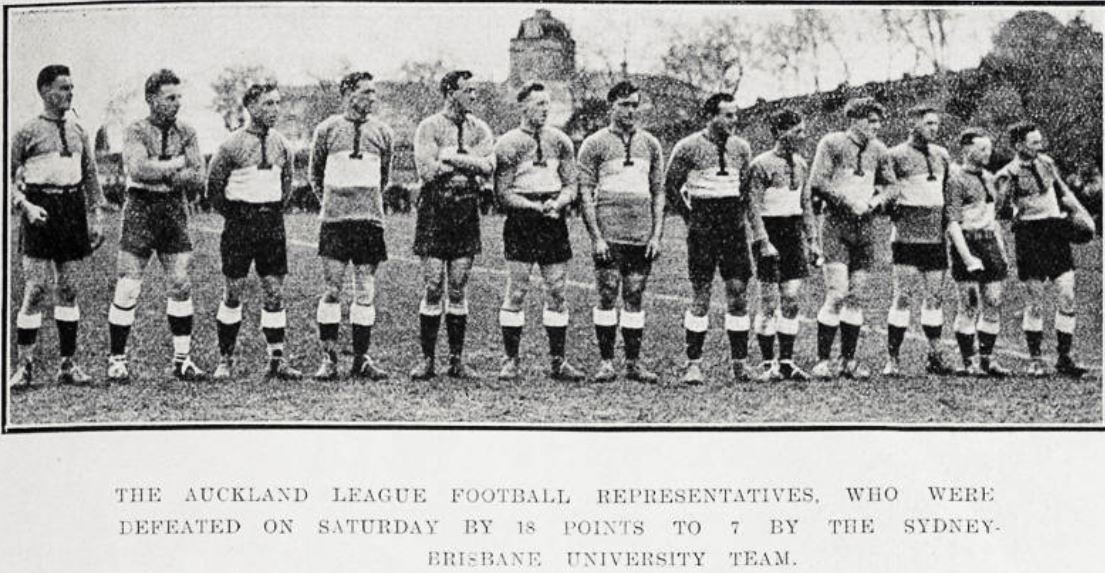
Woolley second from the left in the Auckland team to play the 2nd match against the Australian Universities side at the Auckland Domain on June 24, 1922

He played for the Grafton Athletic club in the Auckland Rugby League competition and represented Auckland against the 1914 Great Britain Lions.

Woolley fought in World War 1 with his period of service totaling 4 years and 6 days, including 3 years and 209 days overseas. He spent 1915–16 in Egypt, and 1916–18 in Western Europe. Woolley was promoted to sergeant on June 16, 1918. He was awarded the British War Medal and the Victory Medal. After the war he joined the Grammar Old Boys rugby club in 1919 and then in 1920 returned to rugby league, playing for Grafton Athletic. That same season Woolley was a part of the Auckland side that defeated the 1920 Great Britain Lions, 24–16 on 24 July and becoming the first New Zealand team to defeat Great Britain on New Zealand soil. He then represented New Zealand, playing in all three test matches against the Lions. He toured Australia with the Kiwis in 1921, but no test matches were played during the tour.
