= Charles Savory =

New Zealand rugby union & international rugby league footballer, and boxer

Charlie Savory
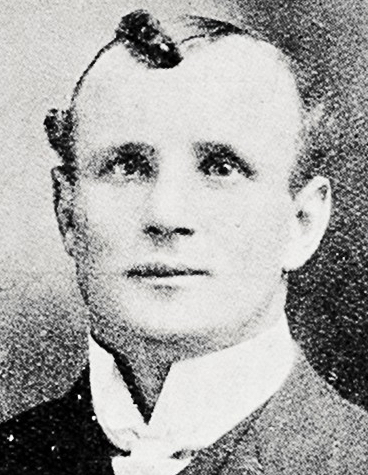

Personal information
- Full name: Charles Savory
- Born: 23 March 1889 New Zealand
- Died: 8 May 1915 (aged 26) Ari Burnu, Gallipoli, Turkey

Playing information

Rugby union
Club
| Years | Team | Pld | T | G | FG | P |
|---|---|---|---|---|---|---|
| 1908–10 | Ponsonby RFC | 21 | 4 | 0 | 0 | 12 |

Rugby league
- Position: Prop
Club
| Years | Team | Pld | T | G | FG | P |
|---|---|---|---|---|---|---|
| 1911–14 | Ponsonby United | 21 | 17 | 13 | 0 | 77 |
Representative
| Years | Team | Pld | T | G | FG | P |
| 1914 | Auckland | 4 | 3 | 11 | 0 | 31 |
| 1911–14 | New Zealand | 10 (1) | 3 | 0 | 0 | 9 |
| 1911–12 | Australia | 4 | 1 | 0 | 0 | 3 |

Charles Savory (23 March 1889 – 8 May 1915) was a New Zealand international rugby league footballer and champion boxer who died in the First World War. An Australasian and New Zealand international representative forward, Savory was one of four Kiwis players selected to go on the 1911–12 Kangaroo tour of Great Britain. Due to playing the same sports, he has been described as "the Sonny Bill Williams of his time."

== Rugby union career ==
In an Auckland Rugby Union club match, while Savory was playing for Ponsonby, he was suspended for two years for kicking a player.

== Rugby league career ==
Savory then joined the new Auckland Rugby League competition, playing for Ponsonby United. An Auckland representative, Savory was first selected for New Zealand in 1911 when they toured Australia, playing against New South Wales and Queensland. He was then one of four New Zealanders selected to go on the 1911–12 Kangaroo tour of Great Britain. In 1912 he was sent off during a match for Ponsonby United and was suspended for the rest of the season, missing the 1912 New Zealand tour.

In 1913 Savory was found guilty of kicking by the ARL judiciary and was suspended for life. Savory claimed it was a case of mistaken identity. This sparked a feud between the ARL and the New Zealand Rugby League as the NZRL heard the case and asked the ARL to reconsider, which they refused to do in June. The NZRL then quashed the conviction and Savory played for New Zealand while he was still suspended by the ARL. The incident resulted in the NZRL suspending the entire ARL board and on 15 January 1914 the NZRL approved an entirely "new" ARL board. Savory again toured Australia in 1913 and in 1914 played in a Test match against the touring Great Britain Lions.

== Boxing career ==
In 1914 Savory won the National Amateur Heavyweight Boxing championship.

== World War I ==
Savory enlisted with the outbreak of World War I. He died of wounds at Gallipoli on 8 May 1915 after landing at Ari Burnu with the Auckland Battalion.

The 2015 Anzac Test man of the match, Manu Vatuvei, was awarded the Charles Savory medal.
