= Stan Walters (rugby league) =

New Zealand international rugby league footballer

Personal information
- Full name: Stanley Charles Walters
- Born: 5 December 1889 New Zealand
- Died: 26 May 1980 (aged 90)

Playing information
- Position: Prop, Second-row
Club
Years	Team	Pld	T	G	FG	P
1911–20	North Shore	72	30	2	0	107
1916	City Combined side	1	0	0	0	0
1917	Combined (City, Newton, N Shore)	1	0	0	0	0
1921	City Rovers (Waik.)	1	0	0	0	0
1926	United (Waik.)	7	2	0	0	6
	Total	82	32	2	0	113
Representative
Years	Team	Pld	T	G	FG	P
1913–20	Auckland	16	8	3	0	30
1913–21	New Zealand	31	12	0	0	36
1921	Hamilton & Cambridge	1	0	0	0	0
1921–26	Hamilton	4	0	0	0	0
1926	Waikato	1	0	0	0	0
- Source: As of 19 December 2020

Stan Walters was a New Zealand rugby league footballer who represented New Zealand.

== Playing career ==
Walters played for the North Shore club and represented Auckland.

He made his debut for New Zealand in 1913 on their tour of Australia. No test matches were played on the tour. Walters made his test debut against the 1914 touring Great Britain Lions.

After the war Walters resumed his New Zealand career, playing for the side between 1919 and 1921.

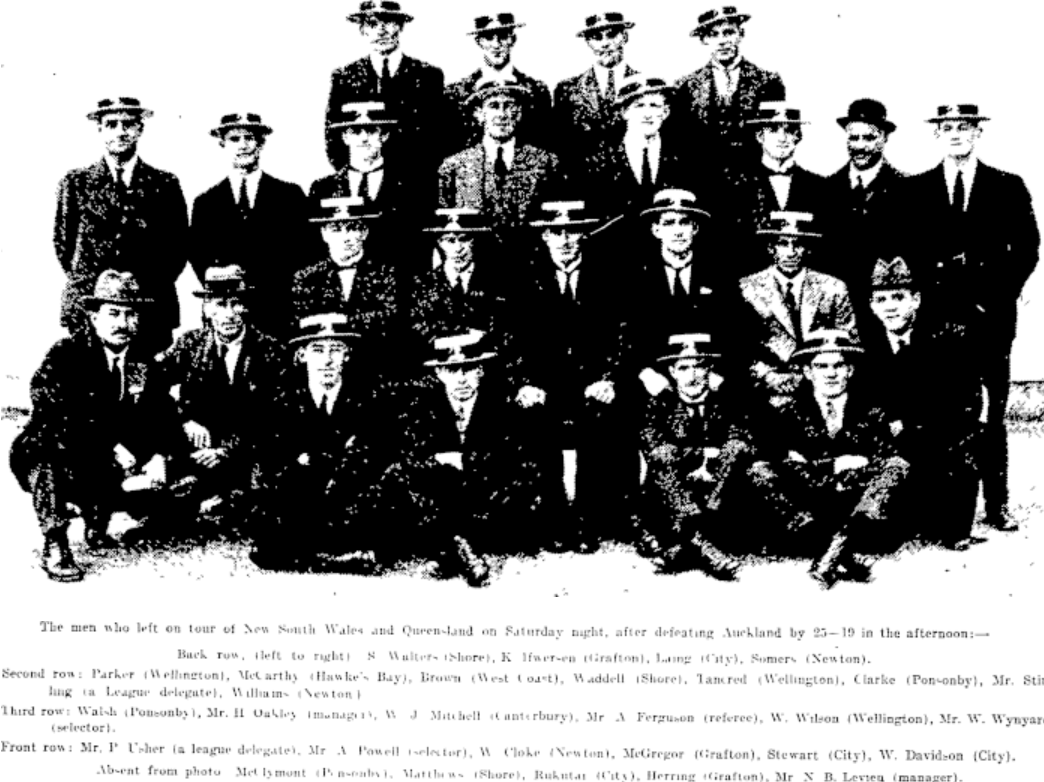
The 1919 New Zealand team to tour New South Wales and Queensland. Stan Walters is in the back row on the left.

In 1920 he captained New Zealand in a three match test series against Great Britain.

In 1921 he moved into the Waikato region and was involved in coaching and playing up until 1926. He in fact joined the local competition that season as a player and after an appearance for the City Rovers side based in Hamilton was selected for the New Zealand tour of Australia. The newly formed South Auckland league presented him with a medal for being the first ever South Auckland player to be selected for a New Zealand tour.
