= Jim Clark (rugby league) =

New Zealand international rugby league footballer

Personal information
- Full name: James Clark
- Born: 4 July 1889 Clevedon, New Zealand
- Died: Unknown

Playing information

Rugby union
Club
Years	Team	Pld	T	G	FG	P
1911–12	Ponsonby	12	1	0	0	3

Rugby league
- Position: Second-row
Club
Years	Team	Pld	T	G	FG	P
1913–20	Ponsonby United	26	8	0	0	24
Representative
Years	Team	Pld	T	G	FG	P
1913–15	Auckland	7	6	1	0	20
1913–19	New Zealand	12	2	0	0	6

James Clark (fl. 1913–1927) was a New Zealand rugby league footballer.

A Second-row forward, Clark represented the Ponsonby United rugby league club and played for Auckland provincially. He had played for the Ponsonby rugby club prior to the 1913 season when he switched codes prior to the start of the season.

Clark played two matches for New Zealand, after being selected for the tour of Australia in 1913. No test matches were played on this tour.

In 1914 Clark played for Auckland against the touring Great Britain Lions. He also played for Auckland against the touring Australian side in 1919.

Clark retired from playing at the end of the 1914 season after being injured. He moved into management at the Ponsonby club after being elected the club captain. However he came out of retirement for the 1916 season and ultimately played for Ponsonby until 1920 though he appeared intermittently and was often listed in the reserves for matches. He only played around 25 games through 8 seasons.

In 1927, Clark coached Otahuhu Primary school to victory in the inaugural Auckland primary school competition.

In 1938 Clark was elected a life member of Auckland Rugby League after being nominated by his Otahuhu club where he was president. He had contributed significantly to the sport in the district for 25 years.
