= Riverhead Rugby League Club =

Defunct NZ rugby league club, based in Auckland

Riverhead
Club information
- Full name: Riverhead Rugby League Club
- Colours: Green
- Founded: 1916
- Exited: 1916; 109 years ago

Former details
- Ground(s): Riverhead
- Competition: Auckland Rugby League

The Riverhead Rugby League Club was a rugby league club which existed briefly in 1916 and competed in the Auckland Rugby League 3rd grade competition. They were based in Riverhead in West Auckland, New Zealand.

== History ==
=== 1915 Exhibition games ===
In 1915 the Auckland Rugby League decided to play a 3rd grade special exhibition match in Riverhead on July 24 between the Newton Rangers 3rd grade side and a local Riverhead team. The match was refereed by Mr. Shaw but there was no result reported in the newspapers the following Monday. Then the following week the Sunnyside club were granted permission to travel to Riverhead to play also.

=== 1916 Club formed ===
On May 5, 1916, the Auckland Rugby League held their weekly management meeting and it was reported that “a newly formed club at Riverhead wrote expressing a desire to participate in the third grade competition, and the secretary was instructed to communicate with its officials with regard to the steps necessary for affiliation”.

Their first ever game was scheduled to be played at Riverhead. It is unknown where exactly the ground was located. The present day Riverhead War Memorial Park was formed in 1932. The match was played on May 20 against City Rovers. The referee was former New Zealand international Stan Weston. There was no score for the match reported. During the following week the league officially approved of the Riverhead clubs colours as green. At the same meeting that organised that the club would play in the city on alternate Saturday's and that when they played at Riverhead opposing captains would be responsible for making their own launch arrangements to make their way up the Waitematā Harbour to Riverhead. In their second match they had to travel to the city to play at Victoria Park, Auckland. Their opponents were Sunnyside. The Observer newspaper wrote that “the Riverhead club journey to town on Saturday, and play at Victoria Park. The members of this newly formed club are showing great keenness, as evidenced by their desire to travel in order to play a game”. On May 31 the transfer of William Doran to Riverhead was approved. They played Richmond A on June 10 but once more no result was reported. A week later on June 17 they suffered a heavy 44–0 defeat to Newton Rangers. On June 21 the former Newton and Māngere Rangers player, H. Hira was regraded to third grade and registered with Riverhead.

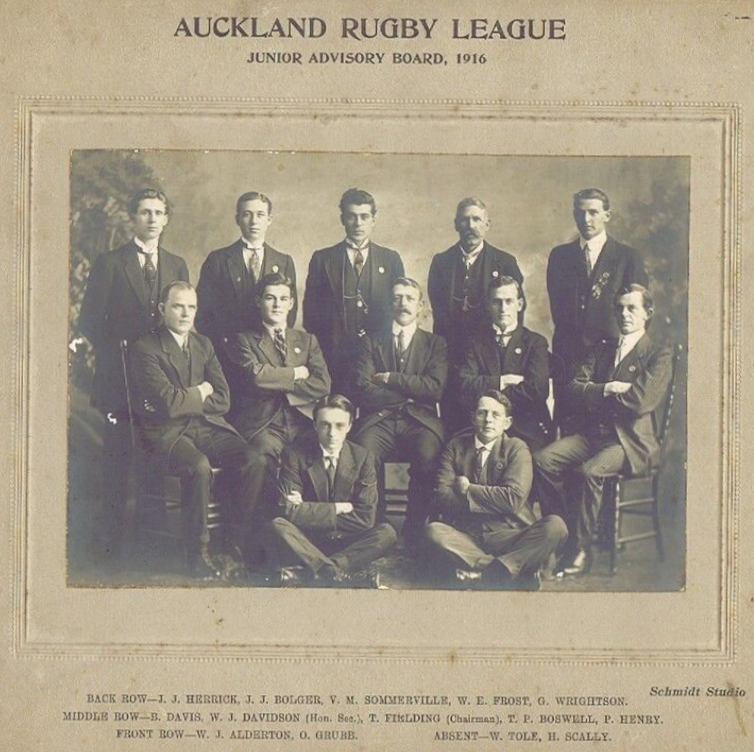
Hugh Scally was on the Junior Advisory Board but was absent for the photograph.

At the same management committee meeting Hugh Scally was nominated by the club to represent them on the Junior Advisory Board.

On the following Saturday on June 24 they hosted Thames Old Boys and lost 14–0. They had a bye on June 24 before a match with Richmond B on July 8. They then defaulted their match with City on July 15. However the league decided to reschedule the match for a later date after the club notified the league that they had been unable to travel due to “launch troubles”.

They played Sunnyside on July 22 before then defaulting two consecutive matches against Thames and then City. The league had a rule whereby two consecutive defaulted matches meant that a team had forfeited the right to compete and so they were ultimately the last ever fixtures for the club. After their removal from competition the club sent a donation of 1 pound and 5 shillings which they had raised from a dance to the rugby league. The money was to go to the Red Cross.

The club wrote a letter to the league which was received at the August 16 board meeting. It stated that “owing to enlistments, it was unable to raise a team for the remainder of the season, and asked permission to withdraw from the competition”. The request was agreed to be the league and three members of their team were granted transfers to the City Rovers second grade team. The players were William Doran, W. Mouse, and Ernest Ruby. Ernest Ruby enlisted in the war in 1917 and his name is on the Riverhead War Memorial Park gates. After returning from the war he played for the City Rovers seniors in the early 1920s and then for Devonport United before debuting for the Auckland representative team in 1927. He played 9 games for them from 1927 to 1931.

In April, 1922 the Auckland Rugby League received a letter "that a league club had been formed at Riverhead, and asking whether teams could come up to play them". The league looked to see if junior teams could travel there on their bye day to play.

== Team record ==
They had 10 fixtures scheduled. Only 2 games had scores reported while they defaulted 3 other matches. The results from their other 5 games are unknown.

Season	Grade	Name	Played	W	D	L	PF	PA	PD	Pts	Position (Teams)
1916	3rd Grade	Riverhead	10	0	0	5	0	58	-58	0	6th of 7
