= 1916 Auckland Rugby League season =

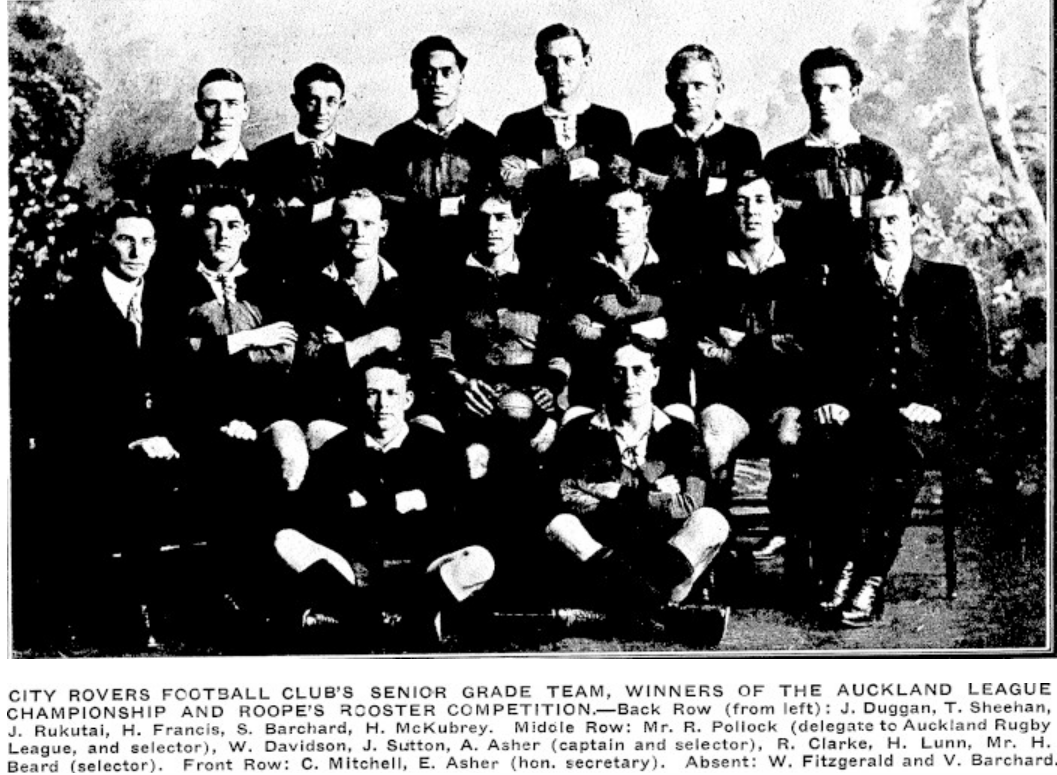
The champion City Rovers side captained by Albert Asher.

The 1916 Auckland Rugby League season was the 8th year of the organisation.

All grades were dramatically affected by players enlisting in the war efforts. Prior to the commencement of the season it was stated in the management committee meeting that 487 players in the Auckland district alone had committed to the war effort. Teams were filled with older players and juniors. The Otahuhu senior team as was noted at their committee meeting featured “only three men eligible for military service..., and these were all registered and waiting to be called up. Of the remainder, six were married men with families, two were permanent force men, and four were under military age”.

Despite this attendances were still good, with the mid season match between City Rovers and Grafton Athletic at Victoria Park attracting 3,000 spectators. While the Round 7 fixtures at Victoria Park drew the same number of spectators and 4,000 attending the round 8 matches. All the gate takings were donated to the Children's Hospital Ward Equipment Fund. The final round saw over 4,000 attend Victoria Park where City Rovers won the title with a 14 points to 10 win over Grafton Athletic. City also went on to win the end of season knockout Roope Rooster competition.

Owing to the effects of the war on playing strength and out of respect for the tremendous war effort there were no representative matches played in 1916, though City Rovers did play the Lower Waikato in two exhibition fixtures (home and away), and Richmond Rovers and Thames Old Boys (based in Auckland) travelled to Thames to play a match at the season end.

| Preceded by 1915 | 8th Auckland Rugby League season 1916 | Succeeded by 1917 |

== Season news ==
=== Club teams by grade participation ===
| Team | 1st Grade | 2nd Grade | 3rd Grade | 4th Grade | 5th Grade | 6th Grade | Total |
|---|---|---|---|---|---|---|---|
| City Rovers | 1 | 1 | 1 | 1 | 1 | 1 | 6 |
| Otahuhu Rovers | 1 | 1 | 0 | 1 | 1 | 1 | 5 |
| North Shore Albions | 1 | 0 | 0 | 1 | 1 | 1 | 4 |
| Ponsonby United | 1 | 1 | 0 | 1 | 0 | 0 | 3 |
| Newton Rangers | 1 | 0 | 1 | 1 | 0 | 0 | 3 |
| Grafton Athletic | 1 | 1 | 0 | 0 | 1 | 0 | 3 |
| Richmond Rovers | 0 | 0 | 2 | 0 | 0 | 1 | 3 |
| Sunnyside | 0 | 0 | 1 | 1 | 0 | 0 | 2 |
| Manukau | 0 | 0 | 0 | 0 | 1 | 1 | 2 |
| Northcote & Birkenhead Ramblers | 0 | 0 | 0 | 2 | 0 | 0 | 2 |
| Thames Old Boys | 0 | 1 | 1 | 0 | 0 | 0 | 2 |
| Riverhead | 0 | 0 | 1 | 0 | 0 | 0 | 1 |
| Telegraph Messengers | 0 | 0 | 0 | 0 | 1 | 0 | 1 |
| Total | 6 | 5 | 7 | 8 | 6 | 5 | 37 |

=== End of season report ===
At the end of the 1916 season a report was made on the season and it was presented to the Auckland Rugby League annual meeting in May 1917. It stated that the playing ranks had been severely depleted over the past season as over 600 players had joined the ranks of the military to fight in the first world war. There were 42 teams in total to compete across six grades (7 in the senior grade, 5 in second grade, 9 in third grade, 7 in the fourth grade, 8 in the fifth grade, and 6 in the sixth grade). Fourteen clubs were affiliated to the Auckland Rugby League with over 800 players in total. The Mangere, Remuera, and Northcote clubs withdrew from the competition due to so many of their players going to war.

Significantly they secured the option of the Chinamen's gardens just off Stanley Street and this was to later be turned into Carlaw Park.

It was suggested that the newly formed Garrison Artillery Club enter a first grade team however as there were already 6 teams competing there was a fear that it would weaken the existing teams. Otahuhu asked for Auckland Rugby League to request a special Saturday afternoon “train to be run to bring players, spectators and the general public to Otahuhu or Saturday afternoons” during the season.

The Junior Advisory Board was J.J. Herrick, J.J. Bolger, V.M. Sommerville, W.E. Frost, G. Wrightson, B. Davis, W.J. Davidson (Hon. Sec), T. Fielding (Chairman), T.P. Boswell, P. Henry, W.J. Alderton, O. Grubb, W. Tole, and H. Scally.

=== Death of Graham Cook and Frank McWhirter in WW1 ===
Graham Cook and Frank McWhirter, who had played first grade football for Ponsonby United (Cook 1915, McWhirter 1914–15) were both killed while fighting in World War I in France. McWhirter had played representative football for Auckland against Thames and Waikato in 1915. The two had been childhood friends, both attending Ponsonby school, and then going on to work for the Auckland Gas Company. They also enlisted on the same day. Frank McWhirter was killed on 9 July 1916 at the Somme in northern France and is buried at Cite Bonjean Military Cemetery, Armentieres, France. Graham Cook was also killed at the Somme on 11 July 1916 in France. He is buried at the Bailleul Communal Cemetery in Bailleul, France.

== 1st Grade championship ==
The 1st grade championship had been competing for the Myers Cup from 1910 to 1914 but after the beginning of the war the league decided to not award trophies though the grade competitions were still competed for as normal. Thirty matches were played during the season with the 20 being played at Victoria Park. The Devonport Domain hosted the 5 North Shore Albions home matches, while Otahuhu hosted 5 matches.

=== Statistics ===
Including the knockout games there were 35 first grade games played with 143 tries, 55 conversions, 39 penalties, 1 drop goal, and 9 goals from a mark. The average number of points per game was 18.2, with 4.1 tries per game. With 55 conversions from 143 attempts the successful percentage was 38.5. The points per game decreased from 18.8 in 1915 to 18.2. The successful conversion percentage went from 42.4 to 38.5.

=== 1st Grade standings ===
| Team | Pld | W | D | L | F | A | Pts |
|---|---|---|---|---|---|---|---|
| City Rovers | 10 | 8 | 1 | 1 | 112 | 57 | 17 |
| North Shore Albions | 10 | 7 | 1 | 2 | 134 | 57 | 15 |
| Grafton Athletic | 10 | 5 | 0 | 5 | 101 | 85 | 10 |
| Ponsonby United | 10 | 4 | 1 | 5 | 101 | 86 | 9 |
| Otahuhu Rovers | 10 | 2 | 1 | 7 | 45 | 95 | 5 |
| Newton Rangers | 10 | 2 | 0 | 8 | 62 | 175 | 4 |

=== 1st Grade results ===
==== Round 1 ====
| 13 May | City | 12–5 | Ponsonby | Victoria Park 1 |
| 3:00 | Try: Bill Davidson, Wilson; Con: Ernie Asher 2 Pen: Ernie Asher | | Try: H Manning; Con: Thomas McClymont | Attendance: 2,000; Referee: Stan Weston |

| 13 May | Grafton | 33–7 | Newton | Victoria Park 2 |
| 3:00 | Try: Karl Ifwersen 2, Tait, John McGregor 2, Marks, Devine; Con: Karl Ifwersen 2, John McGregor, F Collins; Pen: Karl Ifwersen 2 | | Try: Joe Bennett; Pen: Joe Bennett, + 1 unknown | Attendance: 2,000; Referee: Archie Ferguson |

| 13 May | Otahuhu | 9–13 | North Shore | Otahuhu |
| 3:00 | Try: Alf Eustace 2, Sharpe | | Try: T Paul, L Lowe, Cosgrove; Con: Jack Paul; Pen: Jack Paul | Referee: Tom Fielding |

==== Round 2 ====
| 20 May | North Shore | 13–5 | Ponsonby | Devonport Domain |
| 3:00 | Try: T Paul, Cyril Nicholson, Stan Walters; Con: Jack Paul; Pen: Jack Paul | | Try: L Martin; Con: Charles Webb | Referee: Billy Murray |

| 20 May | City | 9–8 | Newton | Victoria Park |
| 3:00 | Try: Bill Davidson; Con: Ernie Asher; Pen: Ernie Asher and 1 mark | | Try: R Clark, Bill Williams; Con: R Clark | Referee: Joseph J. Herrick |

| 20 May | Otahuhu | 9–8 | Grafton | Otahuhu |
| 3:00 | Try: Spence, Montrose Stanaway, J Browne | | Try: John McGregor, Wallace; Pen: unknown 1 | Referee: G Whitley |

==== Round 3 ====
The matches were played in a strong north-easterly wind which would have been whipping across the Waitematā Harbour in the case of Victoria Park, and "pelting rain" but still drew "hundreds of people" to each venue. Both Ponsonby and Newton remained win less after 3 rounds.

| 27 May | Otahuhu | 15–2 | Newton | Victoria Park 1 |
| 3:00 | Try: John Fisher 2, Simmonds; Con: Bernard Farrelly 2 Pen: Bernard Farrelly (1 mark) | | Pen: R Clark | Attendance: 500; Referee: Archie Ferguson |

| 27 May | Grafton | 10–6 | Ponsonby | Victoria Park 2 |
| 3:00 | Try: Devine, F Collins; Con: Karl Ifwersen; Pen: Karl Ifwersen | | Pen: A Cross 3 | Attendance: 500; Referee: Richard B. Calthorpe |

| 27 May | North Shore | 3–3 | City | Devonport Domain |
| 3:00 | Try: Cyril Nicholson | | Try: Jim Rukutai | Attendance: 500; Referee: Tom Fielding |

==== Round 4 ====
Newton had trouble fielding a full team for their match with Ponsonby and ultimately played with 11, with the 28 to 3 defeat being unsurprising.

| 10 June | North Shore | 7–8 | Grafton | Devonport Domain |
| 3:00 | Try: Stan Walters; Con: Jack Paul; Pen: Jack Paul | | Try: Karl Ifwersen 2 Con: Karl Ifwersen | Referee: Joseph J. Herrick |

| 10 June | City | 10–3 | Otahuhu | Victoria Park 1 |
| 3:00 | Try: J Sutton, Jim Rukutai; Con: Ernie Asher 2 | | Try: Alf Eustace | Attendance: 3000; Referee: T Hill |

| 10 June | Ponsonby | 38–5 | Newton | Victoria Park 2 |
| 3:00 | Try: Arthur Cadman 3, Thomas McClymont 2, David Norgrove, Bill Walsh, L Martin, Spence Jones, Sam Lowrie; Con: Thomas McClymont 2, J Winters 2 | | Try: A Thomas; Con: unknown | Attendance: 3000; Referee: Stan Weston |

==== Round 5 ====
The North Shore captain, Jack Paul converted all 7 of North Shore's tries which was a remarkable feat for this era where the conversion success rate would have been around 50%. It was said that many of them were from some distance too. Dougie McGregor played his first game of the year for Grafton, joining his brother John in the side once more. The games at the park had a sixpence charge and a crowd of 3,000 paid to get in.

| 17 June | Grafton | 14–10 | City | Victoria Park 1 |
| 3:00 | Try: Dougie McGregor, Karl Ifwersen 2, Tait; Con: Karl Ifwersen | | Try: J Sutton, Vic Barchard; Pen: Ernie Asher 2 | Attendance: 3,000; Referee: Tom Fielding |

| 17 June | North Shore | 35–6 | Newton | Victoria Park 2 |
| 3:00 | Try: Perrett 2, Stan Walters, Cyril Nicholson, Colson, T Paul 2 Con: Jack Paul 7 | | Try: George Iles, Tumanako | Attendance: 3000; Referee: F Tyson |

| 17 June | Otahuhu | 5–5 | Ponsonby | Otahuhu |
| 3:00 | Try: John Fischer; Pen: Bernard Farrelly | | Try: David Norgrove; Pen: Charles Webb (one mark) | Referee: Archie Ferguson |

==== Round 6 ====
The games were played in "boisterous" weather with a small crowd of just under 1,000 attending the two games at Victoria Park. The point scoring phenomenon Karl Ifwersen was missing for Grafton and possibly as a result Newton pulled off a massive upset when they defeated Grafton by 8 points to 3. Newton had conceded 73 points and scored just 11 over their previous two matches. Jim Clark made his first appearance of the season for Ponsonby. Ben (Stanley Barrett Russell) Rutledge returned to the field for Grafton after having been part of a group which travelled around the Pacific gathering up enemy subjects for internment. He was a police officer by trade and went to Europe as part of the war effort in 1917.

| 24 June | North Shore | 30–0 | Otahuhu | Devonport Domain |
| 3:00 | Try: Bovaird 3, Cyril Nicholson 3, Stan Walters 2 Con: Jack Paul 2 Pen: Jack Paul | | | Referee: G Whitley |

| 24 June | City | 15–8 | Ponsonby | Victoria Park 1 |
| 3:00 | Try: J Duggan, Chook Mitchell, Tom Sheehan; Con: Bill Davidson; Pen: Bill Davidson (& one mark) | | Try: A Innes, David Norgrove; Con: Charles Webb | Attendance: 1,000; Referee: Billy Murray |

| 24 June | Newton | 8–3 | Grafton | Victoria Park 3 |
| 3:00 | Try: George Iles, Bill Williams; Con: R Clark | | Try: Ballantyne | Attendance: 1,000; Referee: Frank Thompson |

==== Round 7 ====
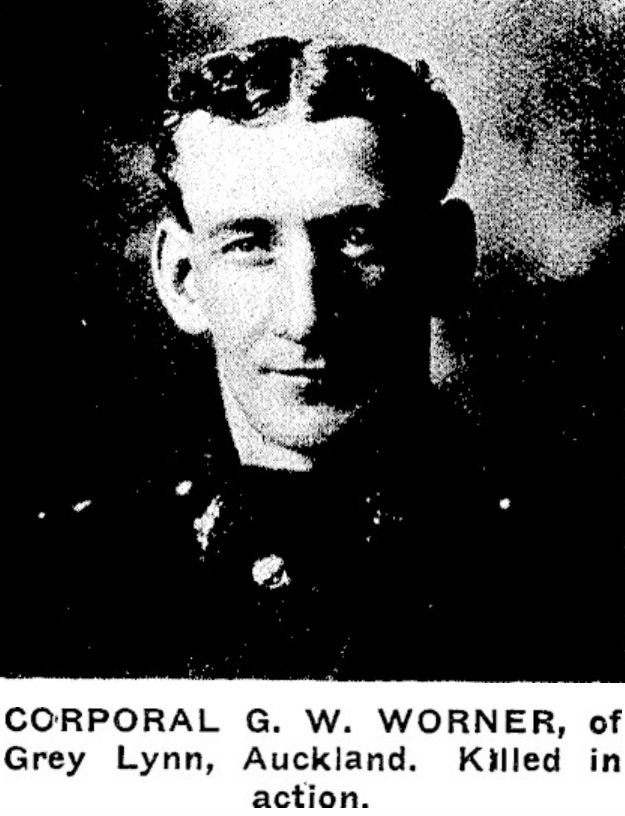
George Worner, Grafton player (formerly City Rovers), played his last game for City. He was killed at Passchendaele on 4 October 1917.

The match between North Shore and Ponsonby at Victoria Park was heavily criticised in the Auckland Star, New Zealand Herald, and Observer newspapers for continual rough play and being one of the worst seen on the park "for some time". The Auckland League discussed it at length at their Wednesday meeting and while there were relatively few incidents in particular which were singled out the match as a whole saw a lot of off the ball play. On one occasion Ernie Bailey, the experienced North Shore forward was said to have stood over Thomas McClymont as he lay on the ground and rubbed his head in the mud. For Ponsonby Jim Clark, who was the New Zealand second rower from 1913-19, played for Ponsonby on the wing and was said to have "played a very fine game". Charles Webb the New Zealand halfback from 1912-13 was also out of position on the other wing and said to have been wasted there. In further comments on the game Stan Walters was said to be the best forward on the ground, and the North Shore player is "undoubtedly the best forward in the league code in the Auckland province". George Worner played his last ever match for Grafton. He enlisted 3 weeks later on 25 July. He was killed at Passchendaele in Belgium on 4 October 1917. Worner moved to Auckland around 1910 from Christchurch. He had played for City from 1911 to 1914, playing in 19 games and scoring 18 points, before moving to the Grafton club in 1915 where he played 11 games scoring 2 tries before one last game here in 1916. He was 30 years old when he was killed.

| 1 July | North Shore | 12–2 | Ponsonby | Victoria Park 1 |
| 3:00 | Try: Cyril Nicholson, T Paul; Con: Jack Paul 2 Pen: Jack Paul | | Pen: Thomas McClymont (one mark) | Attendance: 4,000; Referee: Stan Walters |

| 1 July | Grafton | 8–0 | Otahuhu | Victoria Park 2 |
| 3:00 | Try: Karl Ifwersen 2 Pen: Karl Ifwersen | | | Attendance: 4,000; Referee: Joseph J. Herrick |

| 1 July | City | 19–3 | Newton | Victoria Park 3 |
| 3:00 | Try: Albert Asher, J Duggan 2, Chook Mitchell, Jim Rukutai; Con: Ernie Asher, Bill Fitzgerald | | Try: Charles Potier | Attendance: 4,000; Referee: T Hill |

==== Round 8 ====
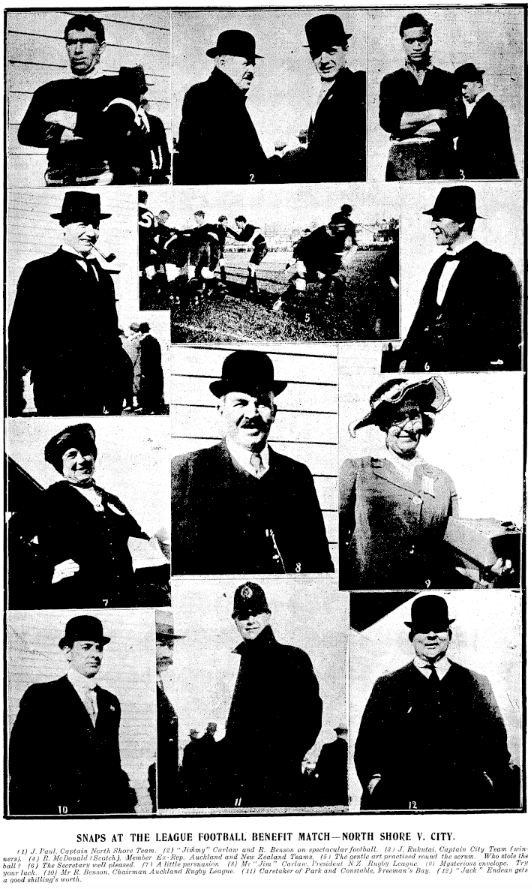

On 15 July the Observer newspaper published a collage of photographs from the 8 July games at Victoria Park. The images were of the following subjects: (1) Jack Paul, the North Shore captain; (2) James (Jimmy) Carlaw (who Carlaw Park was later named after), speaking to Dick Benson, the Auckland Rugby League secretary; (3) Jim Rukutai, the captain of City; (4) Ronald MacDonald (former New Zealand international); (5) Scrum action from the City v North Shore match; (6) Auckland Rugby League secretary; (7) A spectator; (8) James Carlaw, (9) A spectator; (10) secretary Dick Benson; (11) Caretaker of the park and constable for Freemans Bay; (12) Jack Endean. The match at Otahuhu saw the home side take the field with just 11 players and even the referee failed to make an appearance. Eventually the teams agreed to play two 30 minute halves with Newton ultimately winning 8-4. George Seagar was playing for the North Shore after returning from the war for medical reasons and had to come out of the forward pack to replace Colson at five eighth who was carried from the field with an injury during the second half. Otahuhu despite playing at home were two men short for their match with Newton and went down 8 points to 4.

| 8 July | City | 15–4 | North Shore | Victoria Park 1 |
| 3:00 | Try: Bill Davidson, Jim Rukutai, Bob Clark; Con: Bill Fitzgerald; Pen: Bill Davidson 2 | | Pen: Jack Paul 2 | Attendance: 4,000; Referee: Tom Fielding |

| 8 July | Ponsonby | 15–9 | Grafton | Victoria Park 2 |
| 3:00 | Try: Sam Lowrie, Spence Jones, A Innes; Con: Thomas McClymont, Charles Webb; Pen: Charles Webb | | Try: Clancy; Con: Karl Ifwersen; Pen: Karl Ifwersen 2 | Attendance: 4,000; Referee: Billy Murray |

| 8 July | Otahuhu | 4–8 | Newton | Otahuhu |
| 3:00 | Pen: Bernard Farrelly 2 | | Try: George Iles 2 Con: George Iles | Referee: Unknown (F Tyson did not arrive) |

==== Round 9 ====
In the Ponsonby v Newton match Arthur Pooley (Ponsonby) was ordered off for striking an opponent. Despite this Ponsonby still won 11 to 5. It was later reported that he was going to assist a team mate who was being assailed by two Newton players and he was let off with a caution. Alfred Jackson came out of retirement to play halfback for North Shore in their 9-4 win over Grafton. He was said to have "played well while his condition lasted" which may have had something to do with his nickname which the Observer newspaper gave as "Fatty Jackson".

| 15 July | North Shore | 9–4 | Grafton | Victoria Park 1 |
| 3:00 | Try: Perritt 2, Stan Walters | | Pen: Karl Ifwersen 2 | Attendance: 2,000; Referee: Billy Murray |

| 15 July | Ponsonby | 11–5 | Newton | Victoria Park 2 |
| 3:00 | Try: G Wilson, Jim Clark, D McCarthy; Con: J Winters | | Try: George Iles; Con: Charles Potier | Attendance: 2,000; Referee: A Ball |

| 15 July | Otahuhu | 0–5 | City | Otahuhu |
| 3:00 | | | Try: McAubrey; Pen: J Sutton | Referee: Archie Ferguson |

==== Round 10 ====
It was reported during the week that Frank McWhirter and Graham Cook of the Ponsonby team had been killed in action in the war. The two had been childhood friends at Ponsonby School before working together at the Auckland Gas Company and playing together for Ponsonby seniors. Players wore armbands in their honour and did the same for William Edward Vause (Ponsonby), John Dalrymple Muir (Otahuhu), and Jack Perry (Newton) who had all been killed in France. City won the championship with their 14-4 win over Grafton. J Duggan, the City hooker was regularly winning the ball from the scrums so their captain Jim Rukutai decided to take McAubrey off the back of their scrum and play him as an extra five eighth to nullify the Grafton backs, Karl Ifwersen, Dougie McGregor, and John McGregor. The tactic made the game somewhat less of a spectacle but worked to good effect. North Shore received the poor advice that Newton was not sending a team to play them at Devonport and as a result most of the side did not arrive at the ground. A side was hurriedly assembiled including several junior grade players and two short spells were played. Despite this North Shore still won 14-4.

| 22 July | City | 14–4 | Grafton | Victoria Park 1 |
| 3:00 | Try: McAubrey 2, Bill Davidson, Tom Sheehan; Pen: Bill Davidson (one mark) | | Pen: Karl Ifwersen 2 | Referee: Archie Ferguson |

| 22 July | Ponsonby | 6–0 | Otahuhu | Victoria Park 3 |
| 3:00 | Try: Spence Jones, David Norgrove | | | Referee: J Clow |

| 22 July | North Shore | 8–5 | Newton | Devonport Domain |
| 3:00 | Try: Perritt, Stan Walters; Pen: Jack Paul (one mark) | | Try: Stevens; Pen: Joe Bennett | Referee: T Hill |

=== Roope Rooster knockout competition ===
There were 3,000 spectators in attendance at the Round 1 matches at Victoria Park. There were 3,000 in attendance again for the semi-final between City Rovers and Ponsonby United, again played at Victoria Park in muddy conditions. As the result was a draw it meant that the teams and Auckland Rugby League had to decide on how to proceed with the competition. The eventual decision was for Ponsonby to advance to the final and City Rovers to play Newton in a second semi final. City defeated Newton and then in the final they defeated Ponsonby United in front of almost 5,000 spectators.

==== Round 1 ====
G Stewart turned out for North Shore for one of the only times of the season and struggled with his fitness. A (Tab) Cross also played for the first time in some time and played an intelligent game for Ponsonby at first five eighth. Bill Walsh, the future NZ international was said to have played his best game thus far.

| 29 July | Ponsonby | 8–2 | North Shore | Victoria Park 1 |
| 3:00 | Try: L Martin 2 Con: J Winters | | Pen: Jack Paul (one mark) | Attendance: 3500; Referee: Billy Murray |

| 29 July | Newton | 22–8 | Otahuhu | Victoria Park 2 |
| 3:00 | Try: George Iles 2, A Thomas 2, Joe Bennett, Ronald Lovett; Con: Coates, Charles Potier | | Try: Spinley, Montrose Stanaway; Con: Montrose Stanaway | Attendance: 3500; Referee: G. Whitley |

| 29 July | City | WBD-LBD | Grafton | Victoria Park 3 |
| 3:00 | | | | Referee: Tom Fielding |

==== Semi finals ====
The draw between City and Ponsonby caused a problem for the league in that they did not play extra time at this point in the games history. They were forced to draw a name to see who would have to play the following week against Newton and who would go through to the final. Ultimately City had to play Newton to find the team to meet Ponsonby in the final but they won anyway to go to the decider. In the drawn match Charles Webb returned to play at halfback and produced an outstanding defensive performance. With 15 minutes remaining however he received a bad gash over his eye and had to leave the field. As part of the second semi final between City and Newton a competition was held between 5 popular members of the teams with the spectators being able to vote on their favourite player. The nominated players with results were Thomas McClymont of Ponsonby (714), Albert Asher of City (547), Karl Ifwersen of Grafton (230), Joe Bennett of Newton, and Bernard Farrelly of Otahuhu. The later two had no results published though were of less supported clubs and in the case of Otahuhu were playing well away from their home. The results were revealed at half time in the game.

| 5 August | City | 5–5 | Ponsonby | Victoria Park 1 |
| 3:00 | Try: J Sutton; Pen: Bill Davidson | | Try: Thomas McClymont; Con: A Cross | Attendance: 3000; Referee: Joseph J. Herrick |

| 12 August | City | 16–3 | Newton | Victoria Park 1 |
| 3:00 | Try: Bill Davidson, Jim Rukutai, Harry Francis, J Sutton; Con: Bill Davidson; Drop: Bill Davidson | | Try: Arthur Iles | Attendance: 2500; Referee: Archie Ferguson |

==== Final ====
A very large crowd, estimated at 5,000 witnessed City Rovers win the second ever Roope Rooster title, with an 11-5 win victory over Ponsonby. For City, their young star who had risen through their ranks, Bill Davidson playing at outside centre, scored a try and kicked a penalty. For Ponsonby, their captain, and future 'NZ Legend of League' Thomas McClymont scored their lone try which was said by the Observer newspaper to be "the best of the year" after he "raced from his own 25 after seeming to come from nowhere and grabbing the ball from Fitzgerald's hands". The proceeds from the stand at Victoria Park amounted to 30 pounds and were given to charity which meant that over 200 pounds had been given to various charitable causes during the season. The league could have raised more but the council had recently pulled down the fences at Victoria Park as part of a beautification scheme which meant the league could not charge for entry to the final, only for seating in the lone stand.

| 19 August | City | 11–5 | Ponsonby | Victoria Park |
| 3:00 | Try: Bob Clarke, Bill Davidson, Herb Lunn; Pen: Bill Davidson | | Try: Thomas McClymont; Con: A Cross | Attendance: 5,000; Referee: Tom Fielding |

=== Top point and try scorers ===
The following point scoring lists include both Senior Championship matches and the Roope Rooster competition. Karl Ifwersen was the top point scorer for the third consecutive year with 56 points. He also topped the try scoring list with 8. Bill Davidson in his debut season for City scored 38 points. George Iles began the season with Grafton however was granted a transfer to the struggling Newton side along with his younger brother Arthur.

| Rank | Player | Team | Games | Tries | Con | Pen | Mark | DG | Points |
|---|---|---|---|---|---|---|---|---|---|
| 1 | Karl Ifwersen | Grafton | 9 | 8 | 6 | 10 | 0 | 0 | 56 |
| 2 | Jack Paul | North Shore | 11 | 0 | 14 | 7 | 2 | 0 | 46 |
| 3 | Bill Davidson | City | 13 | 6 | 2 | 5 | 2 | 1 | 38 |
| 4 | George Iles | Newton | 12* | 7 | 1 | 0 | 0 | 0 | 23 |
| 5 | Thomas McClymont | Ponsonby | 13 | 4 | 4 | 0 | 0 | 1 | 22 |
| 5 | Ernie Asher | City | 10 | 0 | 6 | 4 | 1 | 0 | 22 |

| Rank | Player | Team | Games | Tries |
|---|---|---|---|---|
| 1 | Karl Ifwersen | Grafton | 9 | 8 |
| 2 | George Iles | Newton | 12* | 7 |
| 2 | Cyril Nicholson | North Shore | 11 | 7 |
| 2 | Stan Walters | North Shore | 11 | 7 |
| 5 | Bill Davidson | City | 13 | 6 |

(*) One of George Iles games was for Grafton before his transfer. He did not score any points in that match.

== Lower grade competitions ==
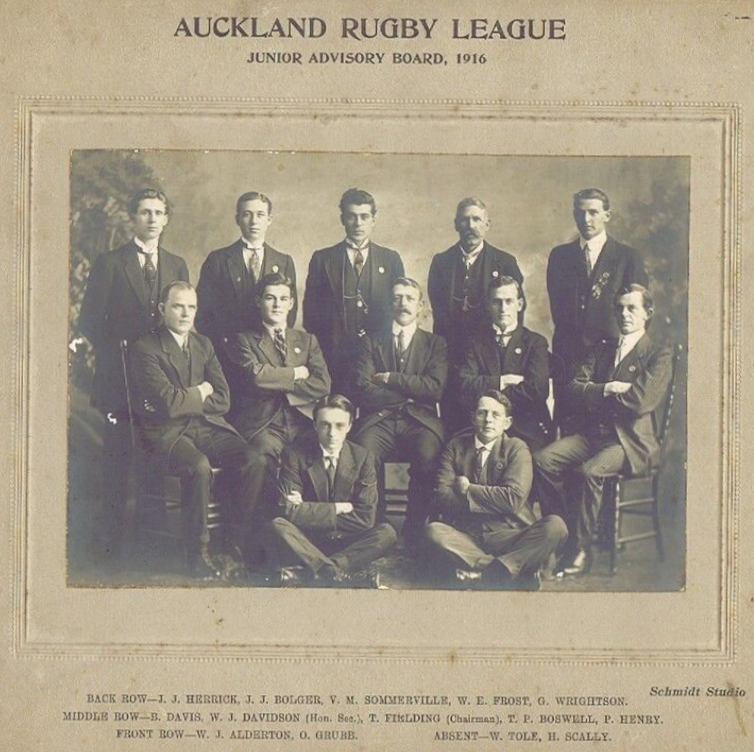

The lower grades consisted of second, third, fourth, fifth grade, and for the first time a sixth grade. Thames Old Boys was made up of players from Thames who had settled in Auckland. The Māngere Rangers club, who only fielded a team in the second grade to start the season wrote to the league in mid June that they had ceased to be a club though they reformed a couple of years later and played until 1934. The Telegraph Messengers Club nominated a team for the fourth Grade. They were often named Post and Telegraph in the media reports during the season. In August the newly formed Riverhead club's third grade team was forced to withdraw due to so many of their players enlisting in the war effort. They wore green. Their remaining players were transferred to the City Rovers second grade side. North Shore Albions won the fifth grade competition undefeated.

=== Second grade standings ===
Ōtāhuhu won the championship around 12 August, which was round 12. A knockout competition was played late in the season which Ponsonby won. Māngere Rangers withdrew after 2 rounds with neither of their results to that point reported. It is likely that they defaulted both matches with the standing rule that 2 consecutive defaults meant a team forfeited the right to compete thereafter, therefore they have not been included in the standings.

| Team | Pld | W | D | L | B | F | A | Pts |
|---|---|---|---|---|---|---|---|---|
| Otahuhu Rovers | 3 | 1 | 0 | 2 | 2 | 16 | 12 | 2 |
| Thames Old Boys | 2 | 2 | 0 | 0 | 1 | 10 | 0 | 4 |
| City Rovers | 4 | 2 | 0 | 2 | 3 | 19 | 30 | 4 |
| Grafton Athletic | 2 | 1 | 0 | 1 | 1 | 10 | 3 | 2 |
| Ponsonby United | 2 | 1 | 0 | 1 | 1 | 14 | 24 | 2 |

=== Third grade standings ===
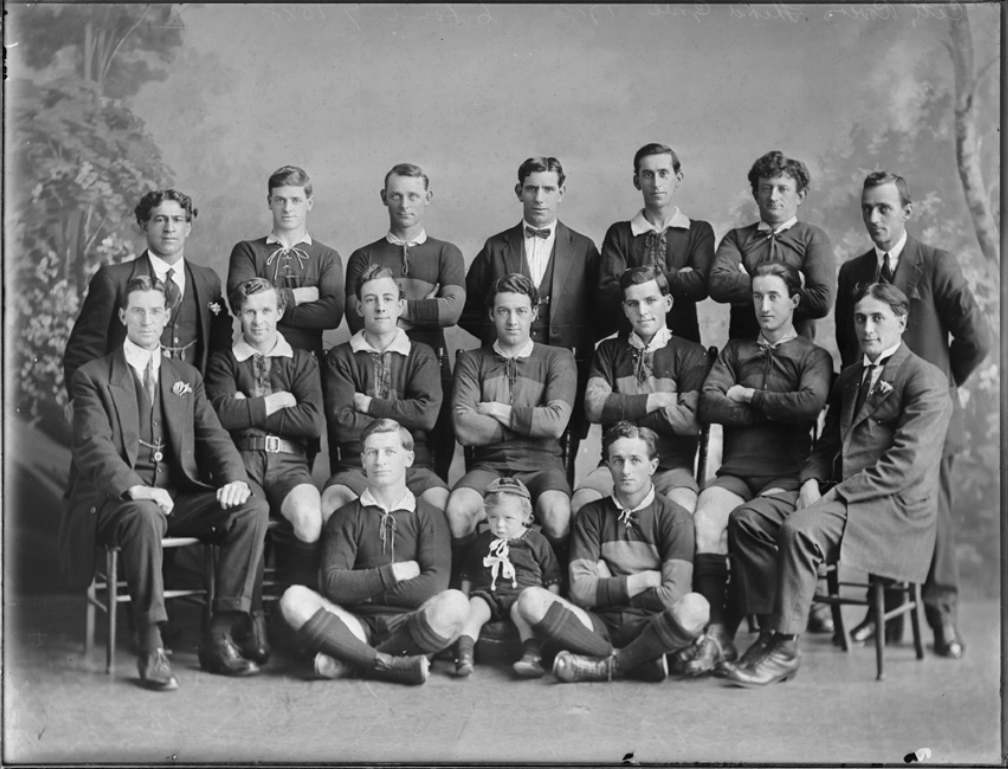
City Rovers, 3rd Grade winners.

Ponsonby withdrew after round 1 with their result not reported and have therefore not been included in the standings. Richmond B withdrew after 7 rounds, while Riverhead withdrew after 11 rounds after having defaulted 3 matches including 2 in a row which meant an automatic removal from competition. City Rovers won the championship however 22 results were not reported so their record would obviously have been better than Newton Ranger's. The Newton Rangers end of season function mentioned that Newton had indeed finished runners up.

| Team | Pld | W | D | L | B | F | A | Pts |
|---|---|---|---|---|---|---|---|---|
| City Rovers | 5 | 5 | 0 | 1 | 0 | 23 | 10 | 10 |
| Newton Rangers | 6 | 5 | 0 | 1 | 1 | 86 | 21 | 10 |
| Richmond Rovers A | 4 | 3 | 0 | 1 | 1 | 34 | 21 | 6 |
| Thames Old Boys | 4 | 3 | 0 | 2 | 2 | 28 | 28 | 6 |
| Sunnyside | 6 | 1 | 0 | 5 | 1 | 60 | 44 | 2 |
| Riverhead | 5 | 0 | 0 | 5 | 1 | 0 | 58 | 0 |
| Richmond Rovers B | 2 | 0 | 0 | 2 | 1 | 0 | 49 | 0 |

=== Fourth grade standings (Endean Memorial Shield) ===
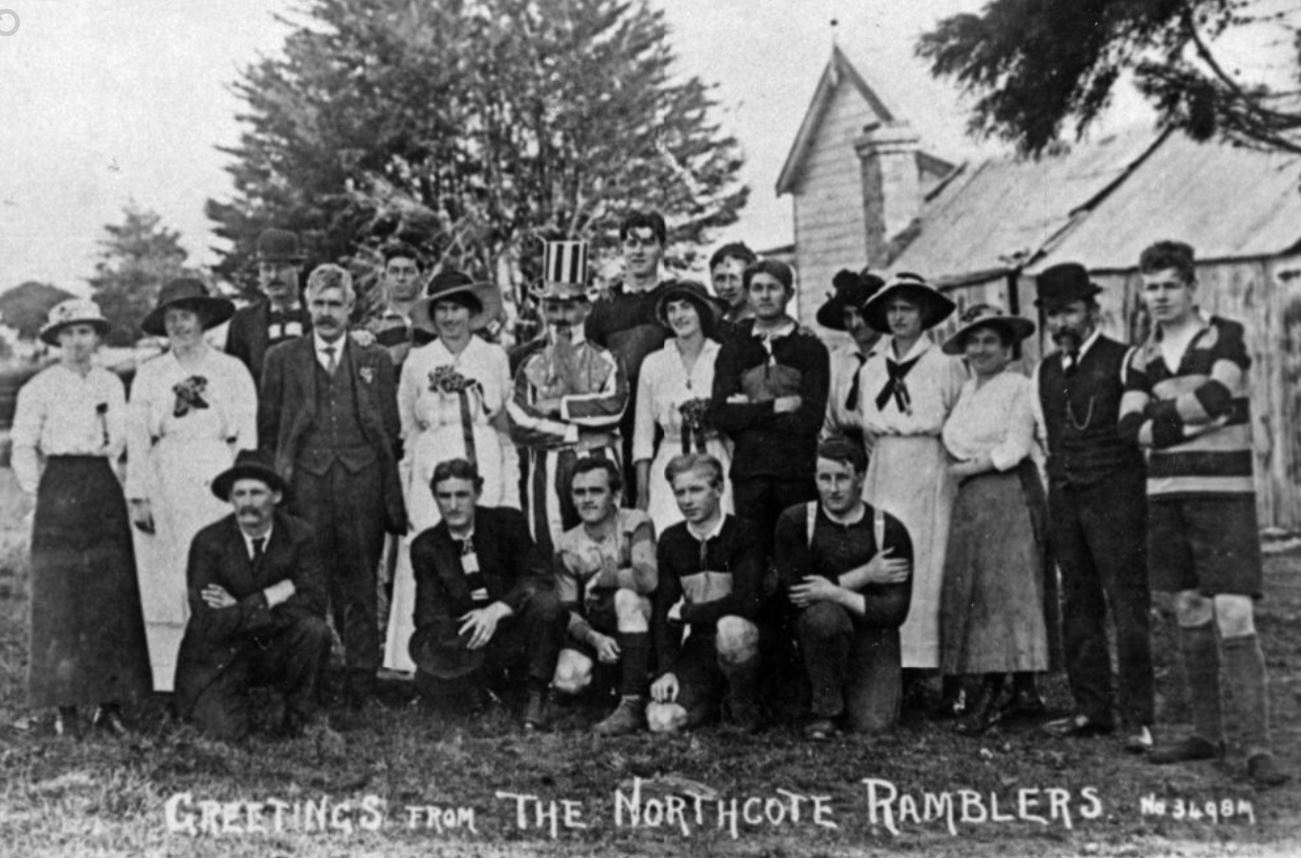
Northcote players following a fancy dress game in Clows Paddock during the season.

City won the competition when they beat Sunnyside in the final on 26 August with a 13-0 win. The Northcote A team withdrew after just 2 rounds after 0-32 and 0-36 losses to Newton, and Ponsonby respectively. City won the championship undefeated after recording wins of 42-0, 31-0, 5-3, 15-0, 20-0, 20-0, 35-0, 14-0, 11-0, and 13-0, along with a 0-0 draw with Otahuhu. Otahuhu only had two of their results reported in the entire season and it is likely that they recorded several more wins.

| Team | Pld | W | D | L | B | F | A | Pts |
|---|---|---|---|---|---|---|---|---|
| City Rovers | 11 | 10 | 1 | 0 | 1 | 206 | 3 | 21 |
| Sunnyside | 7 | 3 | 0 | 4 | 2 | 25 | 66 | 6 |
| North Shore Albions | 8 | 5 | 0 | 3 | 1 | 43 | 81 | 10 |
| Newton Rangers | 7 | 3 | 0 | 4 | 1 | 79 | 58 | 6 |
| Ponsonby United | 7 | 2 | 0 | 5 | 1 | 41 | 76 | 4 |
| Otahuhu Rovers | 2 | 1 | 1 | 0 | 1 | 34 | 2 | 3 |
| Northcote & Birkenhead Ramblers B | 6 | 0 | 0 | 6 | 2 | 15 | 89 | 0 |
| Northcote & Birkenhead Ramblers A | 2 | 0 | 0 | 2 | 0 | 0 | 68 | 0 |

=== Fifth grade standings ===
Ponsonby withdrew after 1 round with no result reported. Manukau defeated Grafton Athletic in round 9 but Grafton were awarded the match after a protest. North Shore won the championship. Their scores were reported for 9 of their 12 matches. The Mayor of Devonport presented the North Shore 5th Grade team with their championship caps on 18 December.

| Team | Pld | W | D | L | B | F | A | Pts |
|---|---|---|---|---|---|---|---|---|
| North Shore Albions | 10 | 9 | 1 | 0 | 0 | 136 | 19 | 19 |
| Grafton Athletic | 13 | 5 | 0 | 5 | 0 | 15 | 36 | 10 |
| Manukau | 11 | 4 | 1 | 3 | 0 | 51 | 24 | 9 |
| City Rovers | 12 | 3 | 0 | 5 | 0 | 31 | 58 | 6 |
| Otahuhu Rovers | 8 | 2 | 0 | 6 | 0 | 19 | 76 | 4 |
| Telegraph Messengers | 11 | 1 | 0 | 7 | 0 | 29 | 59 | 2 |

=== Sixth grade standings ===
Ponsonby withdrew after 1 round with no result reported. Otahuhu withdrew after 5 rounds after 0-41, and 0-52 losses with 2 other results not reported. The City side sealed the championship after a 15-5 win over Manukau in round 10 on July 29. With 2 rounds remaining they were too far ahead to be caught.

| Team | Pld | W | D | L | B | F | A | Pts |
|---|---|---|---|---|---|---|---|---|
| City Rovers | 5 | 4 | 1 | 0 | 0 | 104 | 15 | 9 |
| North Shore Albions | 5 | 3 | 0 | 2 | 2 | 115 | 24 | 6 |
| Manukau | 4 | 1 | 1 | 2 | 1 | 19 | 37 | 3 |
| Richmond Rovers | 2 | 0 | 0 | 2 | 1 | 0 | 69 | 0 |
| Otahuhu Rovers | 2 | 0 | 0 | 2 | 0 | 0 | 93 | 0 |

== End of season exhibition matches ==
The week after the final was played a City Rovers organised side consisting of players from City, Newton, Grafton, and North Shore traveled to Ngaruawahia to play Lower Waikato. City won by 13 points to 9. A week later Richmond and Thames Old Boys (based in Auckland) travelled to Thames to play a match. It was won by Thames Old Boys by 11 to 5. It appears that Bill Davidson, who had traveled with the sides as a Junior Board representative, played for the Thames Old Boys side and scored 2 tries and kicked a conversion.

The last match of the season was played on 9 September when City Rovers played against Lower Waikato at Victoria Park. City Rovers won by 19 points to 8. This brought the Auckland Rugby League season to a close. The curtain-raiser was a match between the Referees Association and Auckland rugby league players and was won by the referees by 10 points to 5.

| 26 August | Lower Waikato | 9-13 | City Combined | Ngaruawahia |
| 3:00 | Try: Callaghan 2, Kay | | Try: Stan Walters 2, Charles Potier; Con: Jack Paul; Pen: Jack Paul (mark) | Referee: Tom Fielding |

| 2 September | Thames Old Boys | 11-5 | Richmond | Dodd's Paddock, Thames |
| 3:00 | Try: Bill Davidson 2, Schofield; Con: Bill Davidson | | Try: McGregor; Pen: Cloke | Referee: Ted Price |

| 9 September | City | 19-8 | Lower Waikato | Victoria Park |
| 3:00 | Try: Bob Clarke, McKubrey, Jim Rukutai 2, Maurice Wetherill; Con: Fitzgerald; Drop: Bill Davidson | | Try: Callaghan, Aubrey; Pen: Littlewood |

== Representative fixtures ==
There were no representative fixtures played in 1916 owing to the effects of the war on senior playing numbers.
