= Auckland Rugby League =

City-level sporting administrative body

- Founded: 1909
- Responsibility: Auckland
- Headquarters: 19 Beasley Ave, Penrose, Auckland 1061
- Key people: Shelley Kopu (Chair); Duane Mann (Chief Executive)
- Competitions: Fox Memorial Premiership Steele Shanks Premiership Sharman Cup Reserves Premiership
- Website: aucklandleague.co.nz
- As of 9 March 2022

The Auckland Rugby League (ARL) is the governing body for the sport of rugby league in the Auckland Region of New Zealand. Founded in 1909, the ARL has played a pivotal role in the development and promotion of rugby league in Auckland and beyond.

== History ==
The origins of Auckland rugby league trace back to July 19, 1908 when an official organisational body was formed at the Chamber of Commerce on Swanson Street, following dissatisfaction among players with the Auckland Rugby Union. The first clubs to form were North Shore Albions (July 23, 1909), Ponsonby United, City Rovers, and Newton Rangers. The inaugural organised club match took place on July 25, 1909, with North Shore Albions defeating City Rovers 44–24.

=== Carlaw Park and development (1920–1974) ===
In 1920, the ARL secured a long-term lease for land, which was subsequently developed into Carlaw Park. The park officially opened on June 25, 1921, with a match between Auckland champions Maritime and City.

=== Modern era and major competitions (1974–2006) ===
In 1974, the ARL purchased Carlaw Park from the Auckland Hospital Board, securing its future. The park continued to host major events until 2002, when it closed as a rugby league venue. The ARL has overseen various national competitions, including the Lion Red Cup (1994–1997), which saw notable successes by North Harbour and Counties-Manukau. The Bartercard Cup also featured Auckland teams, such as Mt Albert Lions and Auckland Lions, achieving significant successes.

=== Auckland Warriors and national impact (1995–Present) ===
A pivotal moment in ARL history was the inception of the Auckland Warriors (now New Zealand Warriors) in 1995. Initially owned by ARL, the club struggled but was sold to a consortium including Tainui in 1998. The Warriors have since become a prominent team in both New Zealand and international rugby league. The ARL continues to be a major force in developing rugby league talent and promoting the sport across the Auckland region.

The Auckland Rugby League was once recognised by England's Northern Rugby Football Union as New Zealand's governing body for the game of rugby league.

In 2009, the ARL celebrated its centenary.

== Club competitions ==
=== Fox Memorial Premiership ===
The Fox Memorial Premiership is the premier rugby league competition in Auckland, New Zealand. Named in honour of Edward Vincent Fox,

=== Steele-Shanks Premiership ===
The Steele-Shanks Premiership is Auckland Rugby League’s Women’s Premiership competition. Named to honour Cherie Steele-Shanks, a pioneer in women’s rugby league. Unveiled at the Annual 2023 ARL Awards Dinner, the cup recognises Cherie’s nearly five decades of contributions.

=== Sharman Cup ===
The Sharman Cup serves as a key part of the local rugby league structure, providing a platform for teams outside the premier division to compete at a high level. The Sharman Cup features a structured format with regular season matches followed by playoffs and a grand final.

=== 2026 senior competitions and teams ===
Fox Memorial Premiership	Pt Chevalier	Bay Roskill	Otahuhu	Mt Albert	Papakura	Manukau	Marist	Ponsonby

Steele-Shanks Premiership	Otahuhu	Mangere East	Manurewa	Mt Albert	Richmond	Pukekohe

Sharman Cup	Mangere East	Northcote	Hibiscus Coast	Te Atatu	Howick	Glenora	Otara	Manurewa

Phelan Premiership	Richmond	Pakuranga	Ellerslie	Waitemata	East Coast Bays

== Auckland Rugby League clubs ==
- Bay Roskill Vikings
- East Coast Bays Barracudas
- Ellerslie Eagles
- Glenfield Greyhounds
- Glenora Bears
- Hibiscus Coast Raiders
- Howick Hornets
- Mangere East Hawks
- Manukau Magpies
- Manurewa Marlins
- Marist Saints
- Mount Albert Lions
- New Lynn Stags
- Northcote Tigers
- Otahuhu Leopards
- Otara Scorpions
- Pakuranga Jaguars
- Papakura Sea Eagles
- Papatoetoe Panthers
- Point Chevalier Pirates
- Ponsonby Ponies
- Pukekohe Pythons
- Richmond Bulldogs
- Te Atatu Roosters
- Tuakau Broncos
- Waitemata Seagulls
- Waiuku Toa

=== Defunct or merged clubs ===
City Rovers and Newton Rangers merged in the early 1900s. City Newton Dragons later merged with Point Chevalier to become 'City-Pt Chevalier'. Later the two clubs separated, and then in 2004 City Newton folded, while Point Chevalier remained. Ponsonby United and Maritime merged to become Ponsonby-Maritime, they parted ways in 1983 and Ponsonby are still in existence. Navy merged with North Shore to become 'Navy/North Shore' however North Shore ceased to exist in 2009.

Other teams to cease as their own entities include:

- Akarana (1926-1935)
- Avondale League Football Club (1930-1958)
- Avondale Wolves (1985-1996, 2020-2022)
- Big Store (1918)
- Blockhouse Bay Rugby League Club
- Coromandel Old Boys (1922–1925)
- Eden Ramblers (1911–1913)
- Eden Roskill Rugby League Club
- Glen Eden Rovers (named Glen Lynn for the last 3 years) (1926–1931)
- Glen Innes
- Grafton Athletic (1914–1922)
- Green Lane
- Hobsonville Pirates (1912–1914)
- Ihumātao (1922–1923)
- Kaipara Lancers
- Kingsland Rovers/Athletic (1920–1931)
- Leys Institute Rugby League Club
- Māngere United (1915–1934)
- Manukau-Greenlane (a merged side)
- Manukau Cruising Club (1923)
- Telegraph Messengers (1916–1919)
- Maritime Football Club (1918–1930)
- Mount Roskill
- Mount Wellington (1929–1931)
- New Lynn League Football Club (1924–1933)
- Newmarket (1928–1931 and 1939–1941)
- North Shore Albions (1909-2005)
- Pupuke (1917)
- Panmure
- Parnell (1918–1931)
- Papatoetoe (1929–1932)
- R.V. (1935–) (Harvey & Sons Ltd (RV = Harvey), part of Carter Holt Harvey)
- Riverhead (1916)
- Remuera (1914–1928)
- Sunnyside Club (1914–1919)
- Takapuna (1921–25)
- Thames Old Boys (1915–1920)
- United Suburbs League Football Club (1924–1926)
- University
- Victoria Cruising Club (1923)
- Waiuku (1934-1937)
- Wesley
- Zora
- Western United
- Eastern United
- Southern Districts
- Northern Districts

== Senior club trophies ==
For a list of the major trophies awarded in Auckland club rugby league go to Auckland Club Rugby League Trophies (this includes player awards as well as team awards).

Past decade winners:

2014	Point Chevalier Pirates		Point Chevalier Pirates	Otara Scorpions
2015	Pt Chevalier Pirates		Pt Chevalier Pirates	Richmond Bulldogs
2016	Papakura Sea Eagles		Papakura Sea Eagles	Te Atatu Roosters
2017	Glenora Bears		Point Chevalier Pirates & Glenora Bears	Otahuhu Leopards
2018	Pt Chevalier Pirates		Pt Chevalier Pirates & Glenora Bears	Bay Roskill Vikings
2019	Howick Hornets		Mount Albert Lions & Howick Hornets	Manukau Magpies
2020	Not Awarded		Not Awarded	Not Awarded
2021	Not Awarded		Point Chevalier Pirates	Not Awarded
2022	Point Chevalier Pirates	Manurewa Marlins	Point Chevalier Pirates	Northcote Tigers
2023	Point Chevalier Pirates	Howick Hornets	Point Chevalier Pirates	Otara Scorpions
2024	Point Chevalier Pirates	Papakura Sea Eagles	Te Atatu Roosters	Otara Scorpions
2025	Otahuhu Leopards	Papakura Sea Eagles	Otahuhu Leopards	Otara Scorpions

== National competitions ==
=== Lion Red Cup ===
When the Lion Red Cup was started in 1994 Auckland was originally represented by four teams. The Auckland City Vulcans, The Waitakere City Raiders, The Counties Manukau Heroes and the North Harbour Sea Eagles. In 1995 the Vulcans were replaced by the Auckland Warriors Colts. In 1996 Auckland City did not compete.

- North Harbour won the competition in 1994 & 1995.
- Counties-Manukau won the competition in 1996 and was runner up in 1994.
- Auckland was runner up in 1995 & Waitakere was runner up in 1996.

=== Bartercard Cup ===
Previously Auckland had a large representation in the Bartercard Cup, in its final seasons before it ceased to run Auckland was represented by the Auckland Lions, Waitakere Rangers, Harbour League, Counties Manukau Jetz and the Tamaki Titans.

- The Mt Albert Lions won in 2002, 2004 & 2005.
- The Hibiscus Coast Raiders won in 2001.
- The Auckland Lions won in 2006 & 2007.

With the folding of the Bartercard Cup, Auckland rugby league team was awarded a place in the new six-team Bartercard Premiership, beginning in 2008. In 2009 the competition was mirrored by Under 18 and Under 16 grade competitions. The competition was replaced by the seven-team National Zonal Competition in 2010. Effectively Auckland club rugby league reverted to its regular form, with the zonal competition representing regional representative teams as in the past.

== Representative team ==
Auckland has played against several touring teams over the years though once the Auckland Warriors started playing in 1995 it diluted the standard of the side and they have not played against full international sides in recent years.

Auckland famously beat Australia, England and France in the space of 21 days in 1977. A feat which the New Zealand Warriors commemorated by wearing replica strips in their Round 24 clash with the Manly Sea Eagles on 26 August 2007, when the Warriors won 36–14 in front of a packed Mount Smart Stadium.

Auckland also beat the touring Australian side in 1989 by 26 points to 24 at Carlaw Park.

Auckland represented New Zealand for most years in the Australian midweek competition (see Amco Cup) in the 1970s and 1980s. Central Districts, Canterbury, Wellington, and South Island also fielded teams .

Auckland representative sides traditionally wear a blue jersey with a white double 'V', in the same style of the New Zealand national rugby league team jersey but with blue instead of black.

== Players of note ==
- Jason Taumalolo – North Queensland Cowboys
- Shaun Johnson – NZ Warriors
- Sosaia Feki – Cronulla-Sutherland Sharks
- Ben Te'o – South Sydney Rabbitohs
- Raymond Faitala-Mariner – Canterbury Bulldogs
- Bunty Afoa – New Zealand Warriors
- Isaac Liu – Gold Coast Titans
- Kieran Foran – Manly Sea Eagles
- Sio Siua Taukeiaho – Sydney Roosters
- Jesse Bromwich – Melbourne Storm
- Kenny Bromwich – Melbourne Storm

== See also ==
- Rugby league in New Zealand
- List of NRL club owners
