= Waiuku League Football Club =

Defunct NZ rugby league club, based in Auckland

Club information
- Full name: Waiuku League Football Club
- Short name: Waiuku
- Founded: 1934
- Exited: 1936

Former details
- Grounds: Massey Park, Waiuku; Rugby Park, Waiuku
- Competition: Auckland Rugby League

The Waiuku League Football Club was a rugby league club in Auckland, New Zealand, which existed for less than 3 years from 1934 to 1936. They competed in the Auckland Rugby League lower grade competitions, namely the Senior B competition. The club was made up of players from Waiuku and the surrounding area in rural South Auckland.

== History ==
=== 1934 Formation ===
The first mention of rugby league in relation to the Waiuku area was on June 28, 1934, when the Ponsonby United club in Auckland advised that one of their teams would visit Waiuku but it was later reported that the grounds at Waiuku had been reserved for rugby union matches and the proposal was therefore deferred. The two grounds in the area were Rugby Park and Massey Park. Then on the 11th of July advice was received by the Auckland Rugby League at their weekly meeting that a club had been formed in the Waiuku district on Monday the 9th of July. Mr. Newth was chairman and Mr. L. Wassell was secretary. They had formed two teams and donations had been received, together with a cup for competition. They had also secured two grounds for use and it was asked that teams be sent for exhibition matches at an early date. Auckland chairman, Mr. G. Grey Campbell said the move was very encouraging, and it was decided that “an official deputation visit the new league and discuss matters”. The Franklin Times newspaper reported that the meeting had in fact formed a rugby league sub-league at Waiuku, and to affiliate with the Auckland league. Waiuku was situated approximately 75 kilometres from the Auckland rugby league headquarters at Carlaw Park and they would have struggled to send junior teams to fixtures there and in other suburban and rural Auckland areas each week while there was also rugby league being played in nearby Tuakau and Huntly to the south. The full committee elected was Messrs L. Newth, A. Healey, D. Coe, P. Tong, B. Flavell, H. Murray, and L. Wassell. They hoped to obtain the services of a coach from Auckland. The club had received several donated trophies, including a cup from Mr. S.C. Sycamore.

On Tuesday, July 17 Auckland RL representatives attended a meeting in Waiuku “and much enthusiasm was shown”. Arrangements were made for Auckland teams to make visits and for matches between Waiuku and Tuakau. The first exhibition was to be between Papakura and Māngere United a week on Saturday with Mr. D. Wilkie representing the Auckland Rugby League with the new teams in the district playing the curtain-raiser. The match between Papakura and Mangere would count for championship points and Roy Otto would referee. During the week the Rev. B. Parapa of Mangere wrote to the league entering a challenge from Tamaki for the Waitangi Maori Shield. It was remarked that Tuakau and Waiuku Maori teams might have to be considered also in regards to a challenge for the Shield. At the same meeting the affiliation of the Tuakai and Waiuku centres as sub-Leagues was confirmed. The match between Mangere and Papakura saw both teams travel on the Auckland Rugby League bus which was leaving Papakura at 1pm but due to the bus being full supporters were instructed to make their own way there. Due to the weather the round of games was postponed so they played the match the following weekend on August 4, marking the date of the first game of rugby league in the area. Mangere won the match 7 to 6 “after a hard, keen game” after holding a four point halftime lead. The Franklin Times wrote a match report and they said that the game took place “under conditions far worse than they would have been the previous week. Though the ground was in fair order, the game was played with a strong wind and at times heavy rain”. Mr. D. Wilkie accompanied the teams to Waiuku and after the match both sides were the guests of the Waiuku officials to a dinner and then to a dance.

The first match known to have been played by Waiuku was against Huia from Tuakau on August 18. The game was played at Massey Park in Waiuku and the team, named “Waiuku Maori” “was outclassed by the more experienced Huia team by 27 points to 0.

=== 1935 Senior B grade ===
The 1935 season saw Waiuku field a team in the Senior B grade where sides competed for the Sharman Cup. On April 16 at the ARL Junior Management committee meeting the Waiuku club had asked to be admitted to the Senior B competition. The question of their admission “was favourably considered though a final decision was held over until the following week. The trophy is still competed for today by sides in the second division in senior Auckland Rugby League. It was essentially the second division at the time though there was a senior reserve grade competition which was of roughly the same strength. They finished the Sharman Cup playing nine games and winning just one, scoring 58 points for and conceding 221. They failed to win a game in the five round Walmsley Colts Shield which followed, and then were beaten in all three games for the Foster Shield. Their first ever match was against Otahuhu Rovers at Sturges Park in Ōtāhuhu on May 4 with Stuart Billman refereeing. Otahuhu won the match 21 to 3. During the week A. Fraser (Newton seniors), and C. Nince (Papakura) transferred to the Waiuku club. The following week they hosted their first ever competition game when they played Papakura on May 11 at one of the Waiuku grounds, likely Massey Park with George Kelly the referee. Papakura were essentially their nearest Auckland rivals. They lost the match 15 to 11 in what was described as “a fairly even game” by the Franklin Times. The following weekend they played Point Chevalier at Waiuku with A. Simpson refereeing. They registered their first win with a 24–15 victory that turned out to be their only one of the season. During the week the junior management board “approved” of the referees decision to refuse to allow the game to continue until a badly injured player left the field. The club also wrote to the board to let them know that they had been given permission for the use of Massey Park and the charge for the ground by the domain board had been sent to the Auckland RL for approval. They were then well beaten in their next five Sharman Cup games, 47-9 by Papakura, 32-4 by Otahuhu, 38-2 by Point Chevalier, 20-0 by Otahuhu, and then 33-4 by Papakura on June 22. After the June 8 loss to Point Chevalier it was discovered that both teams “were out of order”, playing unpermitted players and should both lose competition points. On June 15, the day of the 20-0 loss to Otahuhu, Waiuku also fielded a junior team which beat Waipipi 17-0.

On June 18 Waiuku nominated a fifth grade team to play in the knockout competition. Their club secretary was W. Gordon and the application was accepted. Gordon said that there was much interest in the code in the district. They also asked that a fifth grade team visit the area in the meantime, but the league advised that there was no bye in the grade but a fourth grade side would be available to travel for games. A week later it was arranged that the Newton Rangers fourth grade team would play at Waiuku on June 29. The Newton fourth grade side beat Waiuku “thirds” as they were dubbed in the Franklin Times by 21 points to 3.

The Senior B side now began competing for the Walmsley Colts Shield and began with another heavy defeat, this time to Otahuhu by 40 points to 2 on July 6. They lost 25-5 to Point Chevalier, 25-3 to Papakura, and then 11-2 to Green Lane in their last match in the short competition. On the day of the Green Lane match it was reported that Waiuku schoolboys beat Richmond Rovers 11 to 10. The Richmond club offered to contribute towards the expenses of the Waiuku sixth grade team to play in the city and it was gratefully received by the Auckland Rugby League. The Waiuku team was traveling to Carlaw Park to play Richmond in the No.2 field at 2pm with Mr. A Sanders refereeing. The score of the match was not reported but the league made reference to the “good play of the Waiuku sixth grade team” in the game.

The Senior B side now started the Foster Shield competition and had a 22–3 loss to Papakura, a match with Green Lane that had no result reported, and then a 24–0 loss to Point Chevalier to end their season on September 7. On the teams return to Waiuku from Walker Park in Point Chevalier their bus collided with a sedan car on Great South Road in Papakura at 1am. The bus had its axle broken. It was owned by Mr. R.N. Davies and was used on the Waiuku - Aka Aka - Pukekohe service. With the axle broken the bus was unable to proceed while the car was also so badly damaged it could not be driven either. There were no reports of injuries. The clubs final game of the season was a sixth grade game against Glenora who were one of the weaker sixth grade sides. Waiuku won the September 14 game by 19 points to 6.

=== 1936 Senior B Grade, and two junior teams ===
The 1936 season saw Waiuku's senior B side struggle once more. They had a one win, seven loss record in the Sharman Cup, scoring just 34 points and conceding 127. They also fielded 2 junior team which played in the Lower Waikato rugby league sub-league. The league was based at nearby Tuakau. On May 9 their junior A team played against Te Kohanga, while the junior B team played Manaia. The A Team lost 17 points to 5. The Sharman Cup, senior B side started the season with a match against Point Chevalier at Waiuku on May 9 but the result was not reported. There were very few scores reported in the Auckland Star and New Zealand Herald in this grade and other lower grades during the season. In mid May the club advised the league of the transfer of C.W Moss from Tuakau and of the registrations of M. Pell, W. Blacklaws, and J. Weti. Around the same time F. Flavell transferred from Waiuku senior B team to Newton Rangers reserves.

On May 23 they beat Papakura 7 to 6. However they had fielded a player named C. Bright who had not been regraded from seniors to senior B and so the match was awarded to Papakura. Waiuku “were reported to have understood that Bright, not having played last season was in order”. There was a rule that a player who had not played for a season could play for another club but as he was playing down a grade from the one he previously played in required him to be regraded. Bright had played for the Newton senior side in 1933 and 1934. Bright was then regraded the following week and was now officially eligible to play for them in the senior B grade.On May 30, Waiuku lost to Otahuhu at Otahuhu by 32 points to 8. During the match Waiuku player, W. Ritchie was taken to hospital by St. John ambulance after fracturing his pelvis. The following day it was said that his condition was not serious. The same day their junior side beat Tuakau 9 to 8.

At the June 2 ARL board meeting the Waiuku delegate Mr. Newth reported that the Manukau club had taken their senior player, Peter Mahima who was at Carlaw Park on Saturday when he was expected to play for Waiuku. Newth went on to say “that the transfer had been granted since by the club, which regretted having lost its previous match against Papakura through C. Bright not being in order. It was thought that the player, having stood down for 12 months was eligible. The club had played another senior player last year and considered that, not having heard to the contrary, both Bright and Pell were in order according to grading. In the match against Papakura, Bright the subject of the protest, had only played a few minutes when he was injured and left the field. There was moreover, no score in the first spell, and it was felt unsporting for Papakura to have protested under the circumstances”. In response, the ARL chairman, Mr. Owen Wilkie “pointed out it was unfortunate that the junior committee had to rule according to the constitution and award the match to Papakura on a technicality. Bright was certainly a free agent, having stood down for the period stated, but, nevertheless, required regrading before he could play for Waiuku, which club thus suffered in ignorance”. The Pell they were referring to was N. Pell who played seniors for Richmond Rovers in 1931 and 1932. The league resolved to point out to the Manukau club that its action in depriving Waiuku on Saturday of the services of a player not transferred “was contrary to requirements”. The league looked at the issue one final time but decided against reversing the decision as it would set a precedent.

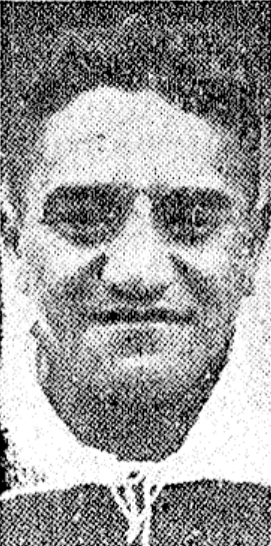
Peter Mahima, Manukau rugby league player, who also represented Auckland Māori.

Peter Mahima (Pitiera Kahanui Mahima) went on to spend five years playing seniors for Manukau and playing 74 games scoring 24 tries. Mahima also played halfback for New Zealand Māori against Australia in 1937 when New Zealand Māori famously won 16 to 5. He went away to fight in World War II and was a corporal in the 28th Māori Battalion, D Company. Another Waiuku player, W. Murray also transferred to Manukau in early June and would go on to play 10 games for their senior side during the remainder of the season.

On June 6 the Waiuku senior B side lost 28-2 to Point Chevalier while their junior side beat Te Kohanga but no score was reported. They played a match against Green Lane on June 13 though there was no result reported and then played the Richmond second grade side on June 20 when Waiuku had a bye. They played Otahuhu on June 27, and then suffered a 29–0 loss to Papakura on July 4. On July 7 P. Tong, D. Shackleton, MacFlavell, and R. Brown all transferred to Waiuku.

The senior B side now began playing in the 5 game Walmsley Colts Shield competition but none of the scores from their first four games were reported with games against Green Lane, Otahuhu, and two against Point Chevalier through July and August. They were supposed to play Papakura at Papakura in the last round on August 29 but Waiuku defaulted the match. At the conclusion of the season the Glenora club, based in Glen Eden, west Auckland was granted permission to send their fifth grade team to Waiuku to play with Mr. A. Bow traveling as their manager.

=== 1937 Amalgamation and folding ===
In mid May the Waiuku rugby league sub-league decided to amalgamate with the Lower Waikato sub-league based at Tuakau. The four clubs involved, Manaia, Pukekohe, Te Kohanga, and Waiuku were nominated for the Ivan Culpan Shield. The Waiuku club played games in that league. One of their teams beat Glenbrook in May. Rugby league is still played in the Waiuku district with a club named Waiuku Toa still entering a small number of lower grade teams in the Auckland competition, most notably a senior B team in the mid 2020s.

=== Team records ===
==== Most senior team ====
The season record for the most senior team in the club.

Year	Grade	Club Name	Pld	W	D	L	PF	PA	PD	Pts	Position (Teams)
1935	Senior B	Waiuku	9	1	0	7	58	221	-163	2	4th of 4
1936	Senior B	Waiuku	8	1	0	7	34	127	-93	2	5th of 5
1935-36	TOTAL	-	17	2	0	14	92	348	-256	4	
