= Thames Old Boys League Football Club =

Defunct NZ rugby league club, based in Auckland

Club information
- Full name: Thames Old Boys League Football Club
- Short name: Thames Old Boys
- Colours: White, Black, and Blue
- Founded: 1915
- Exited: 1920

Former details
- Ground(s): Auckland Domain; Victoria Park
- Competition: Auckland Rugby League

The Thames Old Boys League Football Club was a rugby league club in Auckland, New Zealand which existed from 1915 to 1920. They competed in the Auckland Rugby League lower grade competitions. They were made up of former Thames residents who had moved to live in Auckland partly as the Coromandel Gold Rushes came to an end.

== History ==
=== 1915 formation ===
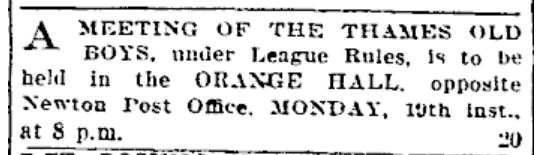
Advertisement for their first ever meeting in the Auckland Star

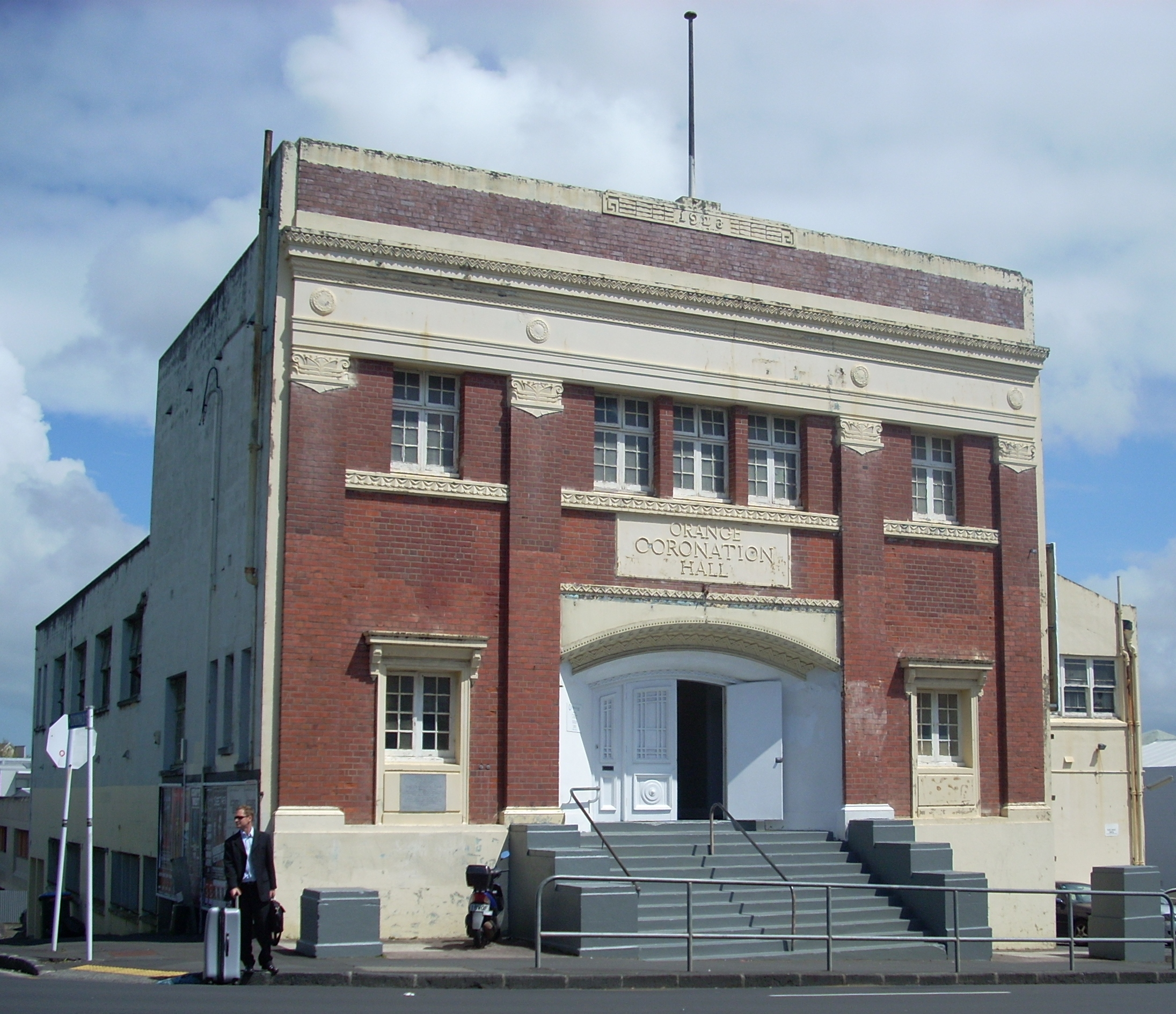
Auckland Orange Hall, location of their annual meetings in Newton

The first mention of a Thames Old Boys rugby league club was in the Auckland Star on 17 April 1915, with an advertisement placed for a meeting. The meeting was held in the Orange Hall, opposite the Newton Post Office, on Monday 19 April at 8pm. Following the meeting V. Somerville was elected the club secretary. On 27 April, the New Zealand Herald reported details of the meeting, stating “at a meeting convened by a number of Thames Old Boys Club and to enter teams it was unanimously decided to form a Thames Old Boys Rugby League enthusiasts to compete in the first, junior, and third grade Rugby League competitions. It was mentioned that from the many players offering, and the support promised, the club should secure a fair share of success, both on and off the field”. The meeting also saw the following members elected:- Patron, Mr. Arthur Mielziner Myers, M.P.; president, Mr. W. Blomfield; vice-presidents, Messrs. (Christopher) James Parr, GCMG, James Twohill, J. Endean, L. Bradley, R. Tudehope, H. E. Partridge, J. Seccombe, P. Hayward, J. Robinson, A. W. Gordon, W. Eddows, J. M. Mennie, Maurice Casey (all of Auckland), H. Bramley, James Twohill, R. R. Price, Len Pedrottie, J. Inglis (Thames); hon members, every member of the Thames Old Boys Association, club captain Mr. C. Williams; field captain, Mr. T. Schofield; delegate to league, Mr. V Somerville; selectors, Messrs. T. Schofield and L. Newmann; hon. secretary and treasurer, Mr. A. R. Smith.

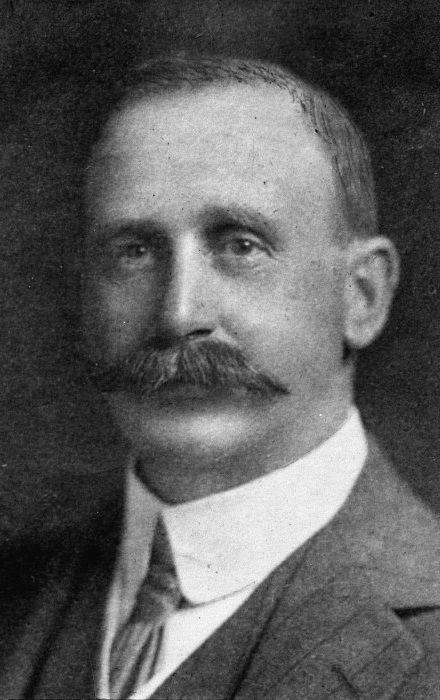
Arthur Myers, the club's patron, was a former mayor of Auckland and an MP from 1910 to 1921

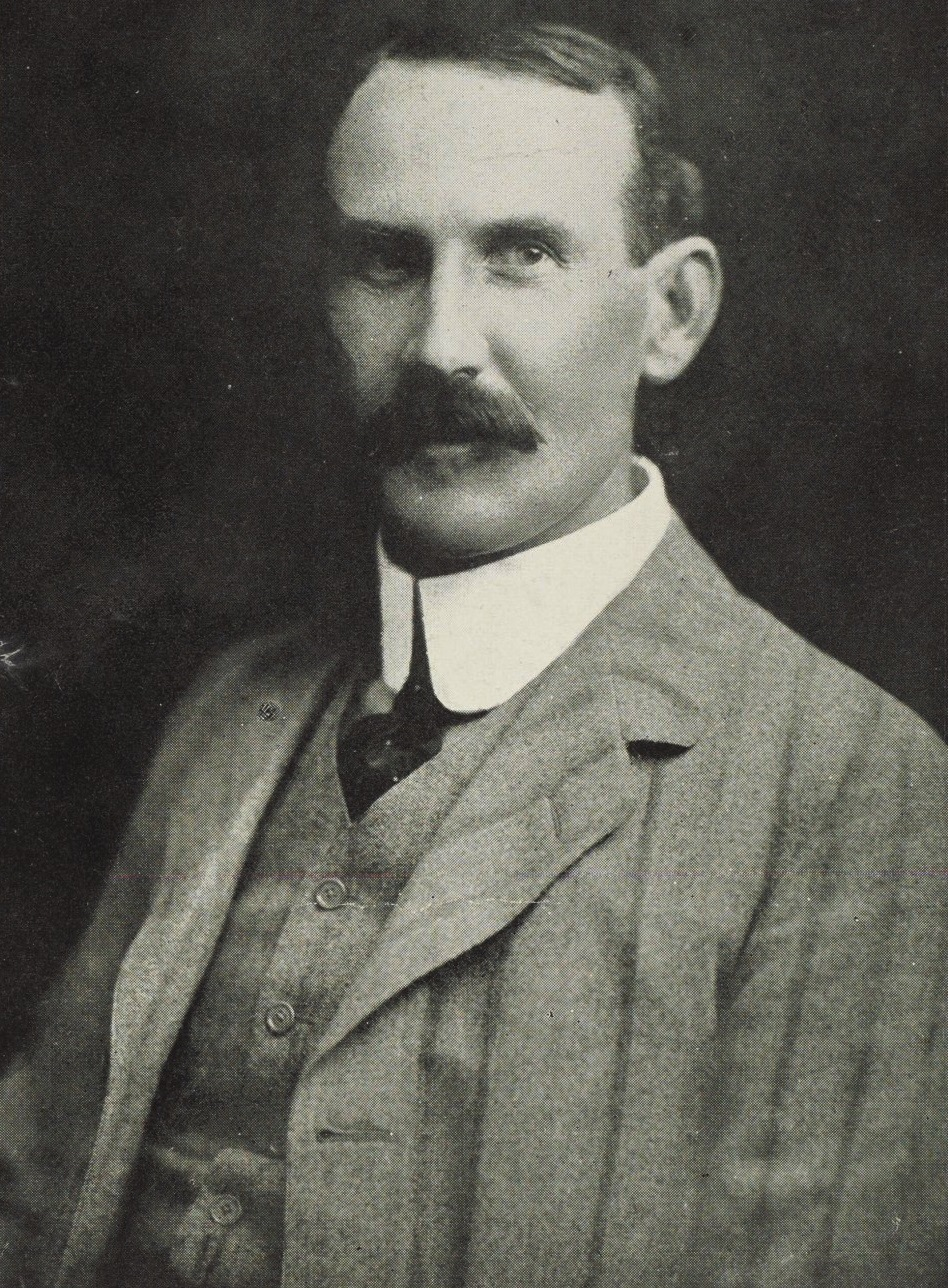
James Parr, the club's vice-president, was the mayor of Auckland from 1910 to 1915, and an MP from 1914 to 1926

On 28 April, the Thames club's application for registration and affiliation to the Auckland Rugby League was received. They also indicated that they intended to enter two teams. At the same meeting, the transfers of Gilbert Peate and W. Somerville from the Newton Rangers to Thames Old Boys were approved. Though Peate had in fact been with the Northcote and Birkenhead Ramblers from 1911 to 1914. Three other players had also applied to transfer from Newton but the Auckland Rugby League had "deferred" a decision for a week pending the formation of the Newton senior team. They wanted to ascertain whether Newton would have the playing numbers to field a side in the first grade before granting any transfers. The Newton club then allowed the transfer of L. Newman, but declined the transfers of Hogan and Schofield. It was reported at the same meeting on 6 May that Thames would hold their first practice games on Victoria Park No. 2 field at 2pm. A week later, the Newton club granted a transfer for Hogan to the Thames side but "objected to the transfer to Schofield, as his services were required for the senior team. It was decided to grant a transfer to both parties, it being stated that Schofield was standing on the line on Saturday last, and that he had not been asked to play by Newton".

On 13 May, their colours were registered as "white jerseys with a black shield monogram and black knickers, black stockings and blue facings". It was also reported that by mid-May the Thames club had registered 26 players. Player, J. Frelan, who had been the secretary of the recently defunct Hobsonville Pirates, also joined the Thames playing ranks.

==== 1915 second- and third-grade seasons ====
Whilst the fixtures were reported each week during the season in the Auckland Star and New Zealand Herald, there were several results not reported by the same newspapers, which were reliant on the clubs to contact them. The second-grade side played 11 matches, winning three and losing five of the known results. They scored 56 points and conceded 50 in those matches, most likely finishing mid table. While the third-grade team played 10 matches, winning two and losing five of the seven reported results, scoring 30 and conceding 65. The first ever named side in the New Zealand Herald was their second-grade team, which was Webber, Kielty, Morten, Marks, Williams, Cole, Adamson, Peate, Newman, Hogan, Somerville, Schofield, Pennycock, Walmesley, Skinner, and McIntyre. Their first ever match was played at 2pm on 15 May against Northcote & Birkenhead Ramblers at Northcote on Auckland's North Shore. Mr. F. Tyson refereed and Thames recorded an 8–3 win. The third-grade side played against Richmond Rovers on the Auckland Domain on the same day but no result was reported. The first time their side was named in the newspapers was for their third match, on 29 May. It was made up of Mangan, Goodwin (2), Kneebone (2), Wheeler, Frelan, Eagle (2), Jeffries, Reid, Martin, Newdick, Loughlin, and Huia. The second-grade side lost their second match, on 22 May, by 11 points to 0 against Remuera, with a comment made in the New Zealand Herald that it was a "fairly good game".

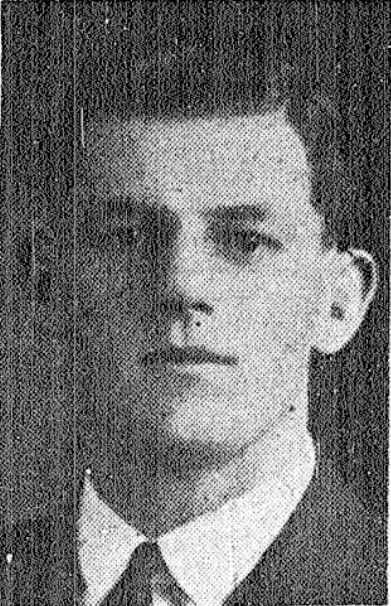
Bill Williams, who attempted to transfer to the Thames Old Boys from Newton Rangers in 1915 but was refused

Around this point in the season, 17-year-old Bill Williams requested a transfer from the Newton Rangers but was refused. Four years later, Williams would be selected for the New Zealand national side. He was later killed when a 12 ft mullet yacht he was sailing on capsized between Milford and Islington Bay on Rangitoto Island.

The first reported scoring for Thames was when their second-grade team defeated Mangere United on 29 May, with Addison scoring two tries, Marks one try, with a conversion, and Peate also kicking three penalty goals. Unfortunately for the side, the result was reversed by the Auckland Rugby League after it was found that Thames Old Boys had fielded a first-grade player.

At the conclusion of the season, the Thames second-grade side was chosen to travel with the Auckland side to play the Thames representative team in Thames. The matches was played at Dodds Paddock, Parawai, on 4 September. They were to play the local Thames B side, with the Thames Old Boys team named: "Fullback, Newdick; three quarters, Adams, Martin, Nicholson; five-eighths, Addison, Peate; halfback, Newman; forwards, Brownlee, Walmsley, Pennycock, Somerville, Hogan, Schofield, Emergencies: McIntyre, Mangan, Kelly", with the side requested to meet at the Man-o' war steps on 3 September at 10pm. The Thames Old Boys won 21–0, with Martin scoring four tries, and Peate, Somerville, and Walmsley scoring one each. With the Thames sides' seasons at an end, Brownlee was selected to play for the Auckland Junior side to play against the Waikato Juniors. He was chosen at second five-eighth. The Auckland Juniors won the match 16–3 on 11 September at Huntly.

=== 1916 season ===
The 1916 season saw Thames Old Boys once again field a second-grade and third-grade side. They held their annual meeting on 10 April at the Orange Hall in Newton once again. Their secretary prior to the meeting was J. Mangan who had placed the meeting advertisement.

Their second-grade team played in 10 matches but only had two results reported, a 7–0 win over City Rovers in the opening round, and a 3–0 win over Otahuhu Rovers in round 8. Their listed side for a mid-season match against Otahuhu was similar to their 1915 side in the backline. It included Somerville, Hogan, Schofield, Walmsley, Marks, Pennycook, Walters, Adams, Goldworthy, Horsfall, Bowden, Campenie, Whisker, and Ross. Their third-grade side played 11 matches but just four results were reported. They lost to Richmond Rovers A 3–22 in round 1, before wins in rounds 4 and 5 over Riverhead 14–0, and Sunnyside 11-3, respectively. Then in their final match they had a 0–3 loss to City Rovers on 12 August. Their side for their 24 June match was Mangden (2), Kelly, Burton, Nell, Rogers, Church, Reid, Newdick, O’Loughlin, Cantell (2), Eaton, Nicolson, Carter, Wheeler, Tuohey, and Madson.

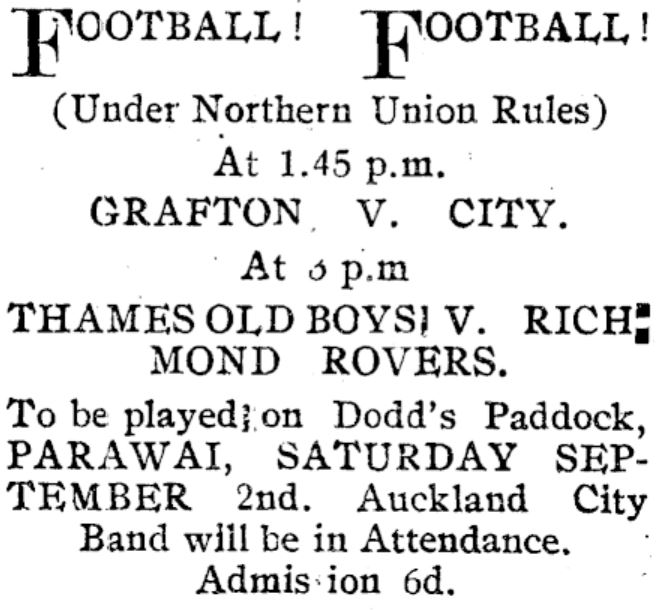
Advertisement for the Thames Old Boys excursion to Thames

In late August the Thames club arranged to go on an excursion to Thames on 2 September. Several teams intended to make the journey with any proceeds being "devoted to charity".

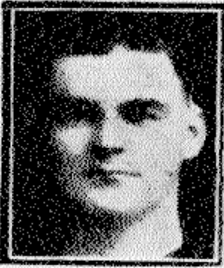
Bill Davidson, who played in the Thames Old Boys exhibition match against Richmond at Thames

They departed on the Friday evening with 300 excursionists. There were four teams in total, including the Grafton Athletic and City Rovers fifth-grade sides to play a curtain-raiser, and the Thames Old Boys second-grade side which was playing against Richmond Rovers at 3pm. The games were played at Dodd's Paddock at Parawai, which is the southern part of present-day Thames township. The sides were accompanied by Dick Benson, the Auckland Rugby League president, Mr. Thompson, to referee, and the Auckland City Brass Band, which played music at the ground. The Thames Old Boys won their match by 11 points to 5. Davidson scored for Thames in the first half and followed with a second in the second half. Schofield then scored and converted his own try. A report from Thames that appeared in the Auckland Star said that the "first-half was a little scraggy, but the second was a good exhibition of the league game, it being fast and open". The Thames Star said "Thames possessed greater speed, and many times outpaced their opponents. From start to finish the game was very willing, and the spectators witnessed some good play". The Davidson who scored twice for them was most likely Bill Davidson who also travelled with the sides as he was representing the Junior Advisory Board, and no player with the surname Davidson had played for Thames Old Boys during the season. Davidson was aged 19 but had already played for the City Rovers senior side and would go on to represent New Zealand from 1919 to 1921. City won the fifth-grade match by 3 points to 0.

=== 1917 and 1918 seasons ===
==== 1917 second-grade runner-up ====
The Thames Old boys again fielded a second-grade side in 1917, but they fielded a fourth-grade side rather than a third-grade side. An advertisement appeared in the Auckland Star on 11 May for their second-grade practice at the Auckland Domain for 12 May. The Fourth-grade side was to meet at Victoria Park for their weighing-in and training. Their secretary was E. Seagar. Their sides for their opening round matches were (second grade) – Newdick (2), Herring, Hogan, Johnson, Reid, Walters, Rogers, Ross, Dalzill, Church, Kelly, Frelan, W. Ross, Burton, and Edwards, (fourth grade) – McCarthy, Buckly, McGregor, Craig, Neal, Baskett, Mangan, Wren, Horsfall, Smith, Hutchinson, Dickens, Nicolson, Mackey, and Patterson. The fourth-grade side drew with Sunnyside 0-0 but Sunnyside fielded an overweight player and so Thames were awarded the match.

With World War I in its mid stages, there had been a large number of players from all clubs away fighting. It was reported on 26 May in the Observer that Jim Johnston and Somerville, secretary and delegate respectively of the Thames Old Boys, were "in Trentham waiting orders". The second-grade team played eight matches and finished runners-up to Ponsonby, while the fourth-grade side played 12 matches, with two reported wins and three reported losses.

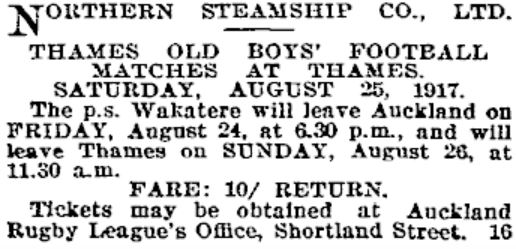
Advertisement for the 1917 Thames Old Boys excursion to Thames

On 25 July, the Auckland Rugby League gave permission at their committee meeting for Thames and Ponsonby United to visit Thames. They left Auckland on Friday 24 August at 6.30pm on board the Wakatere, returning on Sunday 26 August at 11:30am, with tickets for the excursion costing 10 shillings. The teams to travel were both Thames Old Boys sides, with their opponents being the Ponsonby second-grade side, and the Grafton fourth-grade side. Once more, the matches were to be held at Dodd's Paddock in Parawai, which the Thames Hockey Association had given permission to be used. The money raised the previous year and this year was presented to the Thames Women's Patriotic League for the "Christmas billy fund". The two second-grade sides had finished champions (Ponsonby) and runners-up (Thames Old Boys) with the match admission being sixpence.

The fourth-grade side was captained by Meredith with them winning 9–6 on a field described as being in a "shocking state". Meredith and Read scored first-half tries and Cantell towards the end to win the match, which was refereed by Mr. Fielding. The second-grade game saw Thames Old Boys also win, by 11 points to 6. They were captained by Newdick, and their scorers were Matthew, Campney and Smith, with Matthew converting his own try.

==== 1918 solitary team ====
The 1918 season saw Thames Old Boys only field the one team, which played in the third grade. They played 10 matches, with three reported wins and one reported loss, to finish mid-table of the five teams. The club had played a practice match at the Auckland Domain on 27 April, with an advertisement appearing with C. Reid named as their honorary secretary. Their side for an early-season match was Kelly, Horsfall, Powell, Nicolson, Macky, Reid, Cowdell, Cantell, McGregor, Buckly, Mangan, Julian, Webber, Hickey, Dixon, Stack, and Geraghty.

=== 1919-1920 demise ===
The 1919 season saw Thames Old Boys field one team in the second grade. They did not have their result reported in round 1 against Mangere United, and they defaulted their round 2 match before withdrawing from the competition. The 1920 season was to be their last. They played eight matches before appearing to withdraw late in the season with their only two reported results being a 10–22 loss to Northcote & Birkenhead Ramblers, and a 5–31 loss to Maritime. The club then ceased to exist with no further mention of them at all. In 1922 a club named Coromandel Old Boys was formed and played in the Auckland Rugby League 3rd grade competition from 1922 to 1925.

== Records ==
The results are incomplete. The New Zealand Herald and Auckland Star published the fixture list each week with details, but results were only sent to the newspapers sporadically during the season, so these records have been compiled from the known results.

=== Second grade ===
| Season | Pld | W | D | L | PF | PA | PD | Pts | Position (Teams) |
|---|---|---|---|---|---|---|---|---|---|
| 1915 | 12 | 3 | 0 | 5 | 56 | 50 | +6 | 6 | Approximately 4th of 10 |
| 1916 | 10 | 2 | 0 | 0 | 10 | 4 | +10 | 4 | Approximately 2nd of 6 |
| 1917 | 8 | 2 | 0 | 3 | 24 | 22 | +2 | 4 | 2nd of 5 |
| 1918 | 0 | - | - | - | - | - | - | - | No Team |
| 1919 | 2 | 0 | 0 | 1 | 0 | 0 | 0 | 0 | Withdrew after 2 rounds |
| 1920 | 8 | 0 | 0 | 2 | 15 | 53 | -38 | 0 | Approximately 10th of 10 |
| Total | 40 | 7 | 0 | 11 | 105 | 125 | -20 | 14 | |

=== Third grade ===
| Season | Pld | W | D | L | PF | PA | PD | Pts | Position (Teams) |
|---|---|---|---|---|---|---|---|---|---|
| 1915 | 10 | 2 | 0 | 5 | 30 | 65 | -35 | 4 | Approximately 5th of 10 |
| 1916 | 11 | 2 | 0 | 2 | 28 | 28 | 0 | 4 | Approximately 4th of 8 |
| 1917 | 0 | - | - | - | - | - | - | - | No Team |
| 1918 | 10 | 3 | 0 | 1 | 21 | 46 | −25 | 6 | Approximately 3rd of 5 |
| 1919 | 2 | 0 | 0 | 0 | 0 | 0 | 0 | 0 | Withdrew after 2 rounds |
| Total | 33 | 7 | 0 | 8 | 79 | 139 | -60 | 14 | |

=== Fourth grade ===
| Season | Pld | W | D | L | PF | PA | PD | Pts | Position (Teams) |
|---|---|---|---|---|---|---|---|---|---|
| 1917 | 12 | 2 | 0 | 3 | 0 | 69 | -69 | 4 | Approximately 5th of 9. Won in R1 after a protest, and won in R4 though the score was not reported. |
| Total | 12 | 2 | 0 | 3 | 0 | 69 | -69 | 4 | |

== Representative players ==
=== Auckland Juniors (second grade) ===
| Player | Years | Games | Tries | Goals | Points |
|---|---|---|---|---|---|
| Brownlee | 1915 | 1 | - | - | - |
