= Graham Cook =

New Zealand rugby league footballer

Personal information
- Full name: Graham Walker Cook
- Born: 16 September 1893 Russell, New Zealand
- Died: 11 July 1916 (aged 22) France

Playing information
- Height: 177.8 cm (5 ft 10.0 in)
- Weight: 75.3 kg (11 st 12 lb)
- Position: Second-row
Club
Years	Team	Pld	T	G	FG	P
1915	Ponsonby United	8	0	0	0	0

Graham Walker Cook (16 September 1893 – 11 July 1916) was a New Zealander who was killed in World War I.

== Early life ==
Cook was born in Russell in 1893 and was the eldest son of Captain T. W. Cook. The family moved to Auckland and he was educated at Ponsonby District School. He did well at school and won a place in the "High School at Wellington" where he studied for two years. His family again returned to Auckland when he was 16 and he finished his education at Auckland Grammar School. He joined the Auckland Gas Company where he was working at the time of his enlistment in the army.

== Playing career ==
He played as a junior for the Ponsonby United and debuted for their senior team in 1915.

== Death ==
Cook enlisted in the army during World War I and embarked on the Aparima on 29 February 1916. He was killed in France on 11 July 1916.
