= Sunnyside League Football Club =

Defunct NZ rugby league club, based in Auckland

Club information
- Full name: Sunnyside League Football Club
- Short name: Sunnyside Club
- Colours: Green and White
- Founded: 1914
- Exited: 1920

Former details
- Ground: Devonport Domain
- Competition: Auckland Rugby League

The Sunnyside League Football Club was a rugby league club based in Devonport, on the North Shore of Auckland, which existed from 1914 to 1920. They then amalgamated with the North Shore Albions club also based in Devonport. The Sunnyside area referred more specifically to the area to the west of the Navy base along to Stanley Point. The combined side became known as Devonport United. Sunnyside competed in the Auckland Rugby League lower grade competitions.

== History ==
=== 1914 formation and first season ===
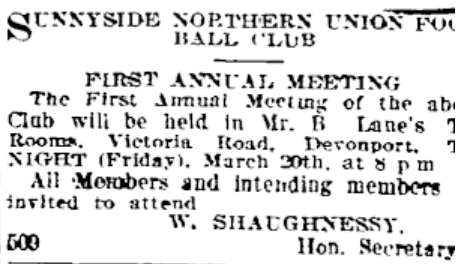

On Tuesday, March 17, 1914, it was reported in the Auckland Star that "a new club – the Sunnyside Club – has been formed at Devonport, to take part in the coming season's competitions under league rules. The club has already a large membership, and intends to enter five teams, including a senior team. It is understood that several well known rugby players will be found in the Sunnyside ranks this season. The first annual meeting will be held on Friday". The first meeting was held that Friday, the 20th of March at (B.) Lane's Tea Rooms in Devonport at 8pm. It was reported that their organiser, Mr William Joseph O'Shaughnessy had “secured” their playing numbers which also included “several leading league men”, and that they had gained the use of the Devonport Domain to train and play on along with the North Shore Albions league club. Their 3rd grade A team was ultimately made up of a large number of the North Shore Albions 3rd grade B team of 1913.

At their first ever annual meeting the following officers were elected:- President, Mr. William Joseph Napier; vice-presidents, Messrs. Wilfred Presley Hayward, Adam Nixon, A. Lloyd, J.L. Benwell, Dr. Atkinson, William James Jaggs, H. Gilfillan, - Meikle, Joseph Kew Harty, J. Bray, H. Bramley, A. Goldwater, and Jno. Fuller; hon. secretary and treasurer, Mr. William Joseph O'Shaughnessy; club captain Mr. W. Parker; committee, Messrs. E. Parker, A. Lloyd, E. Rogers, William Roy Jaggs, Eric Spraggon, Sydney Montague Wynyard, Charles Bramwell Sinton, S.B. Rutledge, A. Martin; hon. auditor, Mr. W. Knox; delegates to the league, Mr. William Joseph O'Shaughnessy (sitting delegate), Messrs. E. Rogers and Gordon Lepine (monthly delegates). They also endorsed a previous resolution “expressing entire confidence in the executive of the old league, and that the club will support that body in the future”. This was in reference to the New Zealand Rugby League removing the entire Auckland Rugby League board over their suspension of Charles Savory, which the NZRL disagreed with. In April the Auckland Rugby League met and decided that they could not accept the reinstatement of W. Knox of the Sunnyside club as he had been disqualified by the New Zealand Rugby League. Knox had been part of the disqualified Auckland Rugby League board and had been the honorary secretary of the Referees' Association.

The Sunnyside club had also applied to enter a team in the senior grade however at the same meeting the Auckland Rugby League held over a decision until their next meeting “to allow evidence to be brought forward regarding the calibre of the club’s players”. At the first meeting of the Junior Advisory Board on April 27, the Sunnyside delegate, William O'Shaughnessy motioned that “the rule of the Auckland Rugby League limiting the number of teams in the senior competition to six be rescinded” and the junior body decided to support this. The City Rovers delegate however moved at a meeting on May 6 that the six team limit should remain. The New Zealand Herald wrote that “this rule has been much discussed in league circles of late, and a certain section of players is very anxious to have it done away with. Sunnyside is the club which is particularly up in arms, as the rule has had the effect of debarring that club from playing first grade”.

On May 9 Sunnyside held their last practice matches. Their fourth grade team played their North Shore Albions counterparts in poor conditions on the Devonport Domain. On the same day the Auckland Rugby League held a meeting where Sunnyside nominated a first junior team, along with other entries.

Then on May 16 Sunnyside took the field officially for the first time. Their second grade side was drawn to play Northcote but defaulted the match and then withdrew from the competition. Their 3rd grade A team played Newton at Devonport Domain at 3pm, while their 3rd grade B team had a bye. Sunnyside's 4th grade side played North Shore at Devonport Domain, and as their match kicked off at 2pm they became the first ever Sunnyside team to play an official match. The two teams to take the field for the first time in the clubs history were: Third Grade A – Gordon Spraggon, W. Parker, L. Fraser, Philip Onslow Arthur Willetts, William Roy Jaggs, E. Black, Leslie Arthur O’Leary, Charles Bramwell Sinton, W. Dalton, C. Happer, C. Marks, Gordon Lepine, and Eric Spraggon. While the Fourth Grade side was – J. Taine, R. Fuller, J. Wheeler, W. Manning, W. Davern, T. Black, F. Taine, John Charles Alexander Chaplin, J.J. Bolger, J. O’Shaunessey, P. Vos, G. Cobb, T. Chaplin, and Jones. The 3rd grade A side lost 17-0 and the 4th grade team lost 12–0. The 3rd grade B team to play in mid June was listed as A. Martin, H. Thompson, C. Gray, A. Bright, H. White, H. Gibbons, K. Manning, Temperton, E. Jones, S. Jones, Darragh, McQuillan, Bayley, Morris, T. Edkins, F. Gallaher, and A. Pratt. As they played in the lower grades there was very limited newspaper coverage, usually restricted to fixture lists, team lists, and scores, which were often not reported either. On the 20th of June the 3rd grade B team played three men short and lost to Remuera 31 to 0. On July 4 Sunnyside and North Shore held a charge day at the Devonport Domain to raise money. Sunnyside 3rd grade A lost to City Rovers 17 to 12, and their 4th grade side lost to Newton Rangers 12 to 6.

The 3rd grade A side ultimately finished around 4th out of 10 sides with the B side finishing last, while the 4th grade side came around 7th of 12. The club held their annual concert in Johnson's Tearooms in Devonport on Saturday night, 19 September with Mr. A. Lloyd, the vice president chairing the evening and several musical items performed.

=== 1915 season, Third and Fourth Grade champions ===
Sunnyside's annual meeting was on Monday, March 15. It was reported prior that they had lost several players through enlisting in World War 1 but would still be able to field “some strong teams in the field”. The 1915 season saw Sunnyside enter 4 teams. They had 2 sides in the 3rd grade, 1 in the 4th grade, and 1 in the 5th grade. Their 3rd grade A team won the competition as did their 4th grade side.

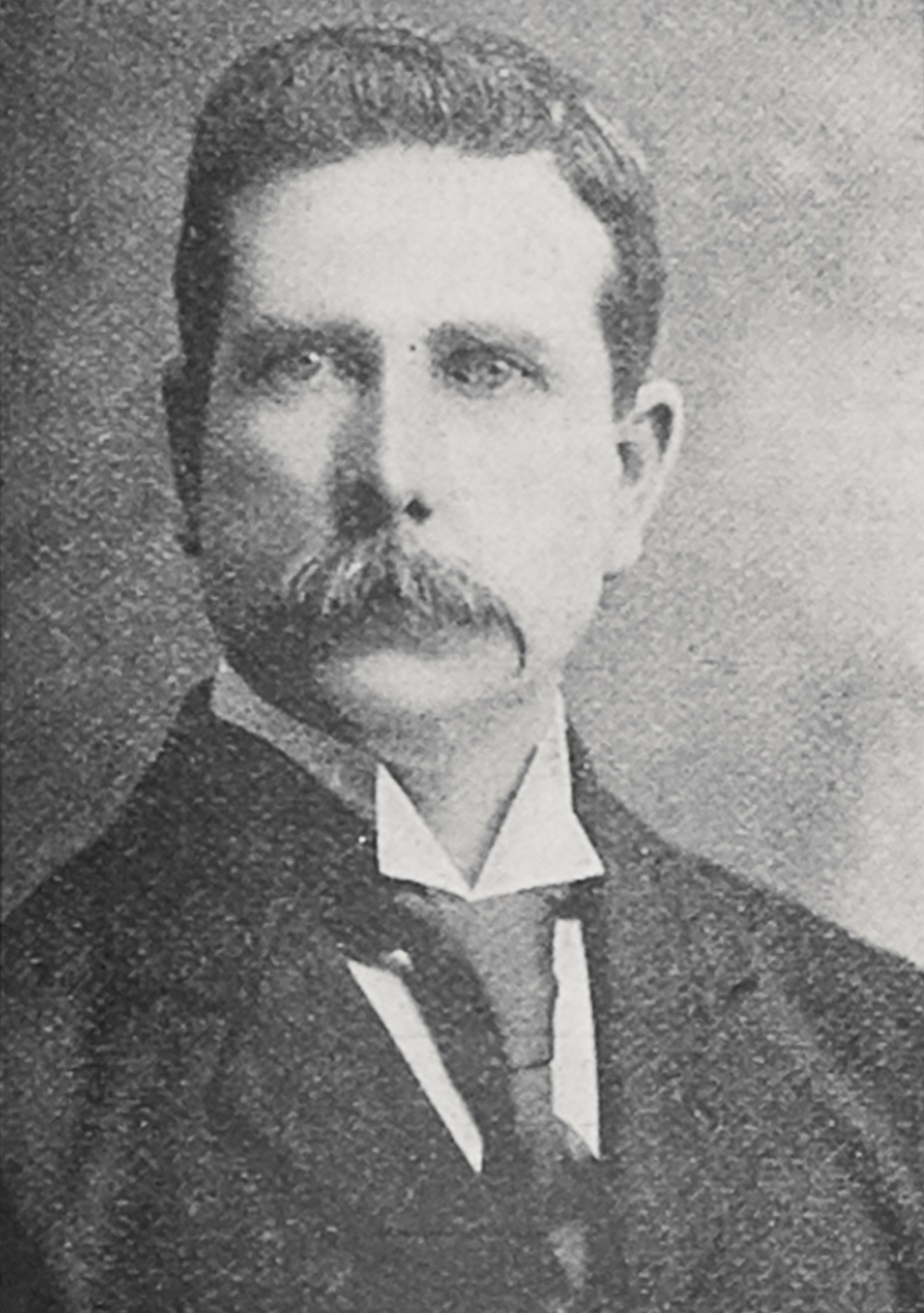
William Joseph Napier (1914 Sunnyside president)

For their annual meeting their president William Joseph Napier was absent with Mr. Robert Tatton of Auckland Rugby League occupying the chair instead. Napier had been a Liberal Party Member of Parliament for City Auckland from 1899 to 1902. Twenty new members were elected and the balance sheet had a credit of £11 10/.

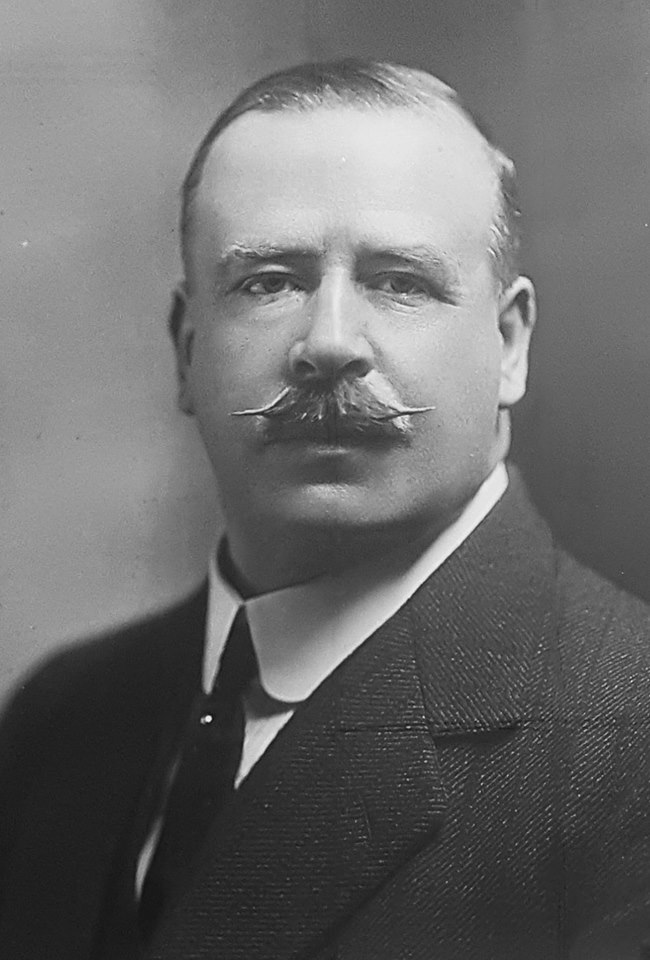
Sir Joseph Ward (Sunnyside club patron)

The following officers were elected:- “Patron, The Right Honourable Sir Joseph Ward, Bart.; the late president did not seek re-election, and Mr. Wilfred Presley Hayward was unanimously elected to the position; vice presidents, in addition to last year’s were Messrs. Henry Cromwell Tewsley, C. Johnson, Alexander Harris, M.P., C. Dunsford, M. Haddon, Dr. C. Wheeler, and Alick Merriott Pickford; hon. secretary and treasurer, Mr. William O'Shaughnessy; assistant hon. secretary, Mr. Gordon W. Spraggon; club captain, Mr. J. Parker; auditor, Mr. W. Knox; committee, messrs. C. Massey, Arthur Gladwyn Fisher, E. Parker, William (Roy) Jaggs, Gordon Lepine, A. Martin, Eric Spraggon, Frank Colebourne, Sydney Wynyard; delegate to the Advisory Board, Mr. William O'Shaugnessy”. Their Patron, Joseph Ward had been the Prime Minister of New Zealand from 1906 to 1912. In the early part of the season the Sunnyside club applied to have their auditor, W.A. Knox's disqualification from 2 seasons earlier lifted. Knox however said he had not himself applied to have the disqualification lifted “nor did he intend to do so”. The club trained on Saturday afternoons in the preseason and had 25 new playing members with the newly formed 5th grade competition said to be bringing in many of them. The committee set their club fees at 1 shilling per year for those players. Once again they were training and playing at the Devonport Domain and they had “acquired” a shed/clubroom “for training purposes”. They set Thursday night as a “compulsory training night, and due preference will be given, when selecting teams to those members who attend regularly”. In their opening round of matches on May 12 one of their forwards, C. Wheeler, broke his hand during a match. During the season the majority of the Sunnyside 3rd grade B team enlisted in the war effort and so their remaining players transferred to their A side.

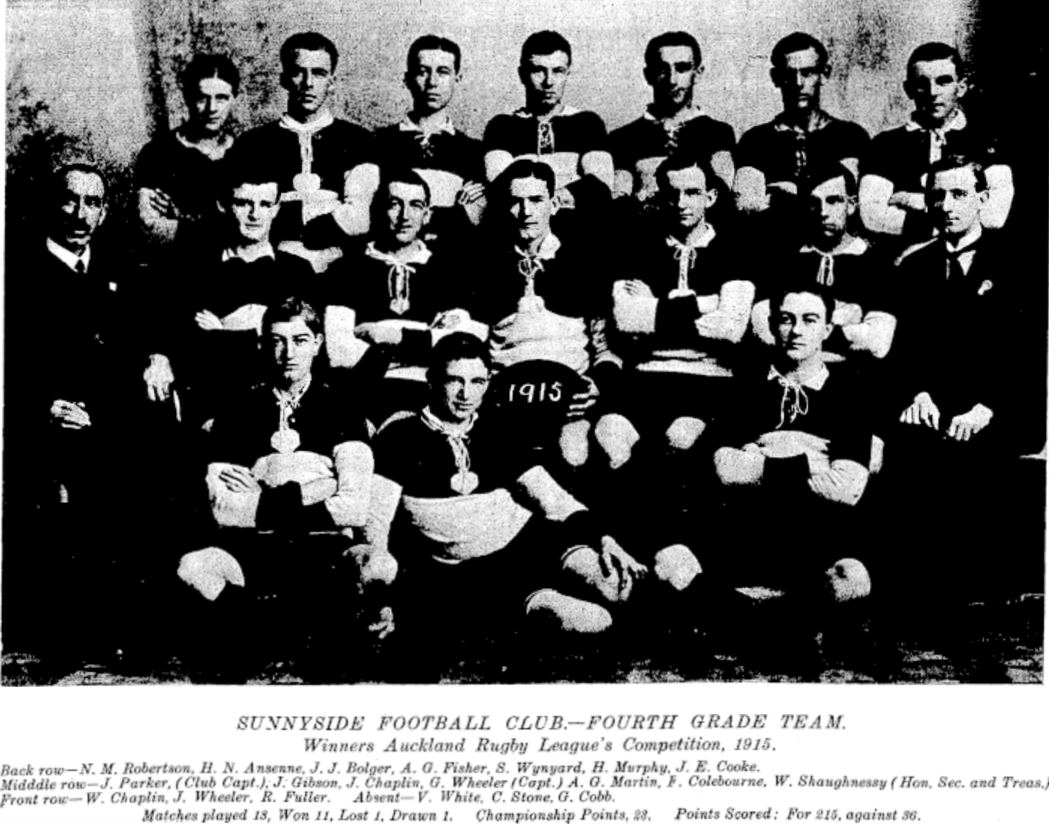

It was reported in mid July that the Sunnyside 4th grade side had secured a 1 point lead in their competition and had scored 137 points while only conceding 15. They ultimately went on to win the championship and on October 16 a photograph of the side was published in the Observer newspaper. Their record was also reported with 11 wins, 1 draw, and 1 loss from 13 games, scoring 215 points and conceding 36. The 4th grade championship winning team was N.M. Robertson, H.M. Ansenne, J.J. Bolger, Arthur G. Fisher, Sydney Wynyard, H. Murphy, J.E. Cooke, J. Gibbons, J. Chaplin, G. Wheeler (captain), A.G. Martin, Frank Colebourne, W. Chaplin, J. Wheeler, R. Fuller, V. White, C. Stone, and G. Cobb.

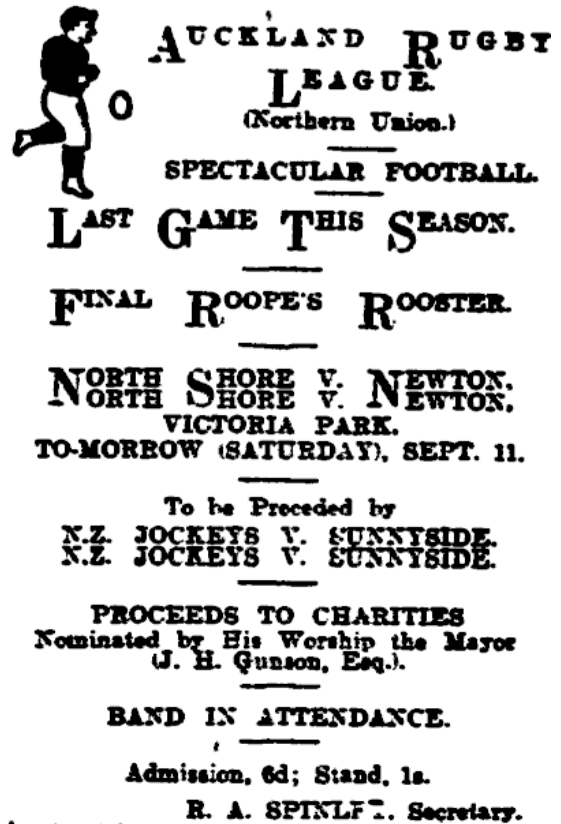

On August 28 both teams wore black arm bands after learning of the death of player Sergeant Major Charles Sinton who had been killed at the Dardanelles. On September 11 the 4th grade side played against a N.Z. Jockeys team at Victoria Park as a curtain-raiser to the Roope Rooster final between North Shore Albions and Newton Rangers. The Sunnyside team won 9-3 with “the most prominent players” for them being Sydney Wynyard (younger brother of former New Zealand internationals Richard Wynyard, and William Wynyard), N.M. Robertson, A.G. Martin, and V. White.

At the conclusion of the season on the evening of October 2 the club held their annual concert. They farewelled several members who were “leaving with the next reinforcement draft for Trentham”. There were 120 members in attendance and it was hosted by Mr. Crandall with Mr. Wilfred Hayward, the president of the club as chairman. There were several toasts made to various parts of the rugby league community such as the Junior Advisory Board, the Referees Association, and other clubs, along with “King”, and “our absent members at the Front”. The champion third and fourth grade teams were presented with their caps by the Auckland Rugby League chairman, Mr. Richard (Dick) Benson. Several entertainment items were performed while secretary Mr. William O'Shaughnessy, was presented with “a handsome traveling bag and a set of military brushes”.

=== 1916-17-18 seasons, losses to war ===
In 1916 Sunnyside entered a team in the 3rd grade and came mid table out of 8 sides, and a team in the 4th grade which came around 2nd out of 8. They reported at their annual meeting that 32 out of 45 members from their 1915 membership had enlisted in World War 1.

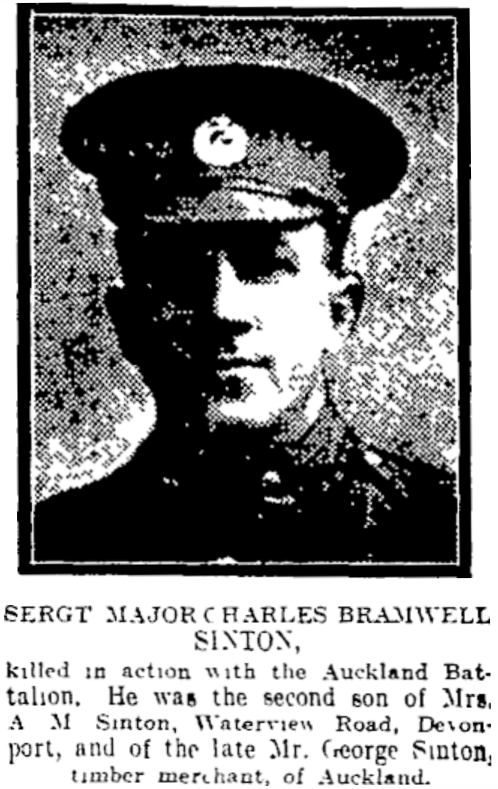

Regimental Sergeant Major Charles Bramwell Sinton had been killed at Gallipoli in 1915 on August 8, aged 23, as had Alan Miller who was killed on August 10, aged 21. Cecil Harold Marks, and E. Johnson had both been wounded. Other men who were at the front or enlisted included Arthur Lloyd, Eric Joseph Spraggon, Leslie Arthur O’Leary, Edward John Parker, William Roy Jaggs, Sydney Montague Wynyard, Gordon William Lepine, Gordon William Spraggon, Thomas Chaplin, William Charles Dalton, Thomas James Edkin, E. Darragh, F. Gallaher, C. Grey, H. Gibbons, F. Gibbons, E. Jones, K. Manning, N. Manning, C. Massey, A. Turner, Geoffrey Vaughan Wheeler, Charles Bertie Vaughan Wheeler, Waaka Simon Rewa, C. Stone, H. Murphy, A.G. Fisher, and William Joseph O’Shaughnessy. The annual meeting was held on March 6 in Devonport. Fifteen new members were elected and “reference was made to the excellent work performed by the retiring secretary and treasurer, Mr. [William] O’Shaughnessy, who is now in Trentham training camp”. It was noted that “about 70 percent of the members have volunteered for active service”. The following officers were elected:- President, Mr. Hayward; vice presidents, same list as last year, with the addition of Messrs. A.M. Pickford, G. Gribbin, A. Brett, B. Goldwater, E. Woodall, and C.J. Smith; hon. secretary and treasurer, Mr. Bolger; assistant secretary and treasurer, Mr. M. Ansenne; club captain, Mr. J. Parker; delegate to advisory board, Mr. Bolger; committee, Messrs. Martin, Lowe, Bailey, Frank Colebourne, and Voss; auditor, Mr. Knox. When O'Shaugnessy was on final leave from Trentham before departing for the war he was “presented with a wristlet watch by members of the league as a memento of his connection with the game in Auckland and to mark the esteem in which he was held by those associated with him in the control of the game generally”. On August 26 Sunnyside 4th grade side lost the final to City Rovers by 13 points to 0. The 1917 saw Sunnyside only able to field one side which was in the 4th grade. They only had a handful of their results reported and finished in the lower half of the 8 team competition.

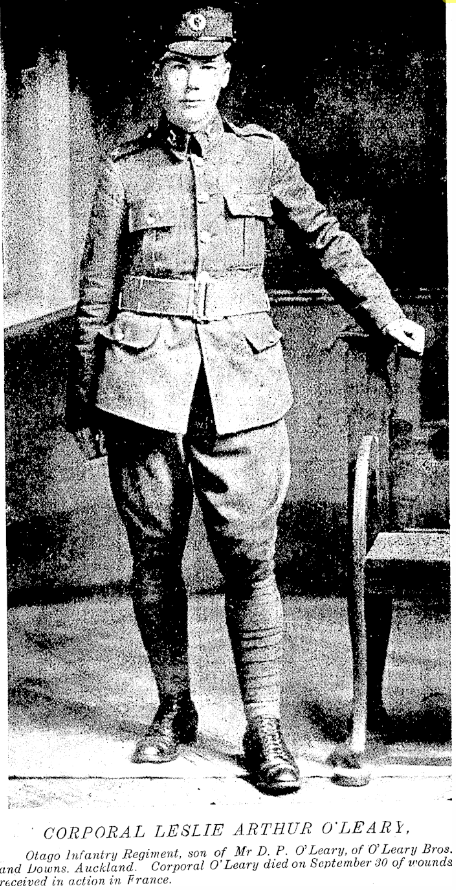

It was reported that Leslie Arthur O’Leary had also been killed in the war on September 20, 1916, in France aged 21. The Auckland Star wrote an article on rugby league players who had enlisted and noted that the “Sunnyside Club has only nine members left” and that “William O’Shaughnessy… had compiled a record of league players that he has personally met in the trenches. The list contains 120 names of players from various clubs. The list is a unique one and is treasured by the league secretary. The three secretaries from the club have enlisted and the executive have also gone”. The club reported a credit balance of £12 from the previous season.

In 1918 the Sunnyside club reported to the Auckland Rugby League that its members had decided to “affiliate with the North Shore club during the period of war” with the affiliation approved of. On April 17 they forwarded the names of their officers to the league and entered one side in the 4th grade. They finished mid table out of 9 teams though very few of their results were reported once again.

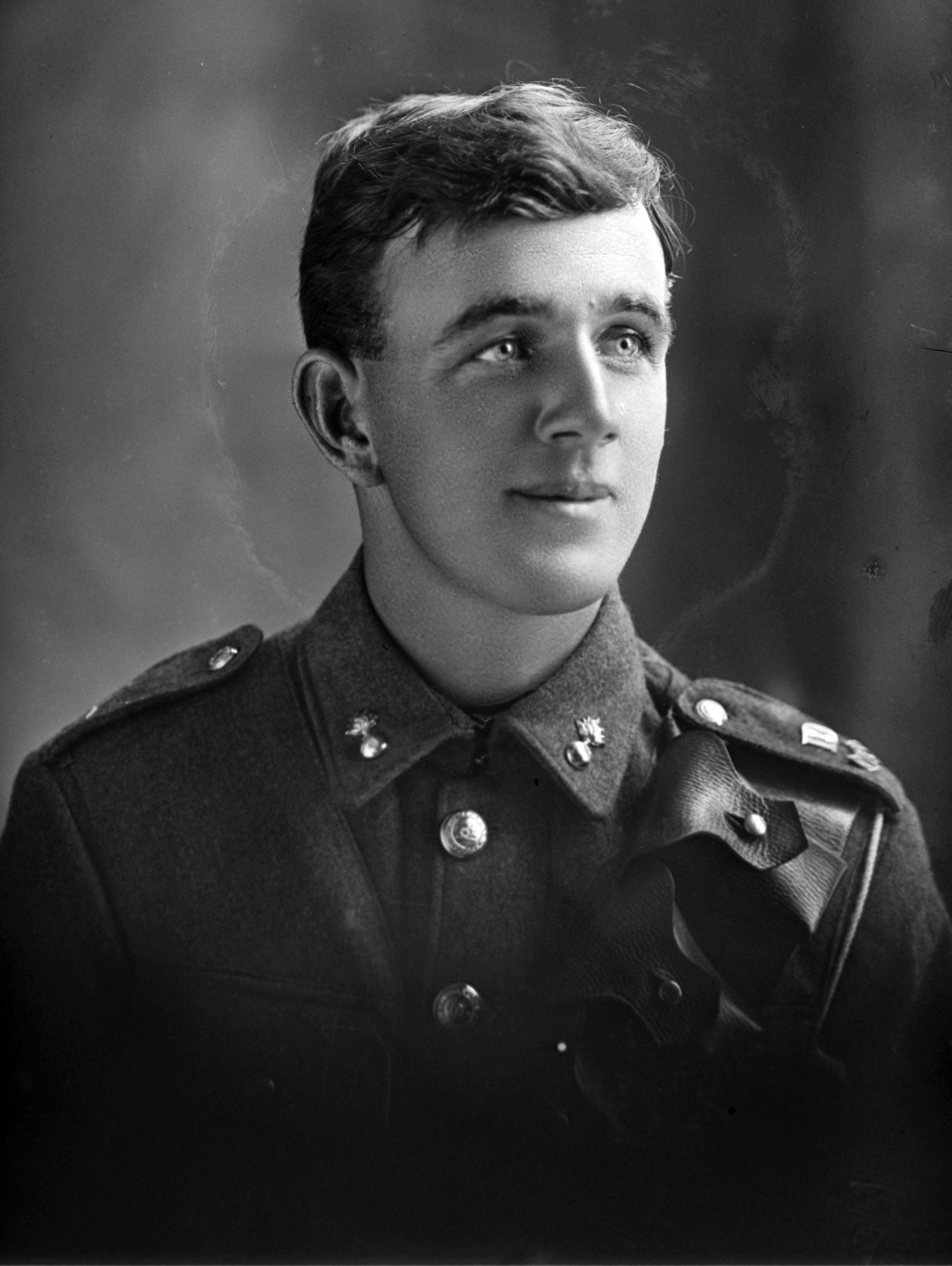
Edward John Parker

On September 26, 1918 Sunnyside player Edward John Parker was killed in action in France aged 24. He was buried at Lebucquiere Communal Cemetery Extension, Pas-de-Calais, France. William Charles Dalton, a Sunnyside player, and saddler by trade, died whilst at war on November 8, 1918 from pneumonia aged 25.

=== 1919 season, post war revival and Second Grade champions ===
With the war over many of the Sunnyside players returned and became available to play once more. The club initially fielded five teams, one in each of the 2nd, 3rd, 4th, 5th, and 6th grades. Though the 3rd, 5th and 6th grade sides all withdrew from their competitions relatively early in the season due to a lack of players.

Their annual meeting was held on Friday, March 14 where the Mayor of Devonport, Mr. John Henderson, unveiled the club's roll of honour on a “handsome plaque” which contained 87 names, of which 19 had been killed in the war. At the meeting they decided to form a social club which would be opened in April in Hayward's Buildings, Victoria Road in Devonport. The following were elected officers:- Patron, Sir Joseph G. Ward; president, Mr. W. P. Hayward; club captain, Mr. William J. O'Shaungnessy; hon. secretary, Mr. Sydney Montague Wynyard; hon. secretary, Mr. C. Hand; auditor, Mr. W. Wilson; club delegate, Mr. William J. O’Shaughnessy; executive, Messrs. C. Stone, H. Dee, J. Carnahan, J. Buchanan, R. Bailey, E. Brown, W. Chaplin, S. Anderson, and A. Murphy.

With Sunnyside and City Rovers leading the second grade competition it was decided to play their match as curtain-raiser to the Auckland v Hawke's Bay representative match on August 9 at the Auckland Domain. City won the match 8 points to 5. Sunnyside however gained a 1-point lead over City going into the final round. On September 13 the two teams met and drew the ‘final’ 8-8. As Sunnyside remained in the lead by the one competition point they were awarded the championship. The championship winning team which had been listed for a June 14 match was L. Fraser, Bertie Victor Emerali, W. Robinson, Harry Douglas, G. Godicke, H. Dee, F. Carnahan, Nelson Samuel Fraser, Philip Onslow Arthur Willetts, E. Harvey, J. Buchanan, C. Wheeler, H. Murphy, and Gordon Lepine.

=== 1920 amalgamation with North Shore Albions ===
In 1920 Sunnyside held their annual meeting in the Tudor and Co's Rooms on Victoria Road in Devonport on March 12. The club soon after decided to approach the North Shore Albions club regarding a possible amalgamation. The two clubs met in early April in Devonport with John Henderson presiding before a large attendance. The chairman “explained that it was considered more advisable to have one strong club than two weak ones. A great deal of discussion centred around the name of the new club, and Mr. D.W. McLean and others strongly urged the retention of North Shore Albion, as it was the name of the first club to start the Northern Union game in New Zealand. Some of the members of Sunnyside Club opposed this proposal. Eventually it was decided to amalgamate and call the new club Devonport United.

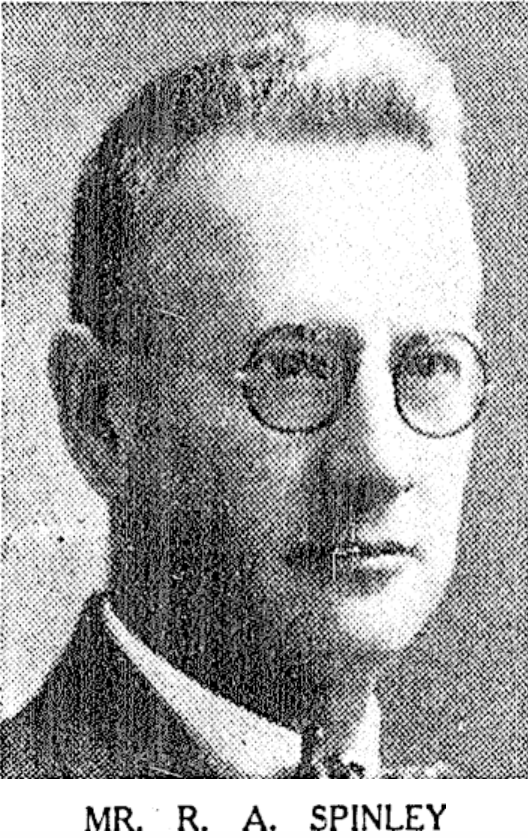
Robert Arthur Spinley, club auditor in 1920

The following officers were elected:- Patron, the Mayor of Devonport, Mr. Horace Stephen Waterlow King; vice patrons, Messrs C. Court and W. Arnold; president, Mr. J. Henderson; vice-presidents, all the vice-presidents of both the defunct clubs; treasurer, Mr. G. Stewart; club captain, Mr. Sydney Wynyard; delegate to the Auckland Rugby League, Mr. William O'Shaughnessy; delegate to the Junior Advisory Board. Mr. D.T. Young; auditor, Mr. Robert Arthur Spinley; committee, Messrs’ C. Stone, George Seagar, Gordon Spraggon, C. Davis, J. Percival, H. Mann, W.A. Fowler, Stan Walters, G. Carnahan; secretary Mr. William O’Shaughnessy; assistant secretary; Mr. C.H. Bowyer. It was decided that the colours of the club should be green and white broad bands.

== Records ==
The season record for the most senior men's team in the club (only the 1915 season record is complete, the other seasons only had intermittent results reported in the newspapers at the time).

Season	Grade	Pld	W	D	L	PF	PA	PD	Pts	Position (Teams)
1914	3rd Grade	8	3	0	5	66	46	+20	6	4th (of 10)
1915	3rd Grade	13	11	1	1	215	36	+179	23	1st (of 10)
1916	3rd Grade	6	1	0	5	60	44	+16	2	5th of 8
1917	4th Grade	6	0	1	5	15	125	-110	1	6th (of 8)
1918	4th Grade	4	1	0	3	30	49	−19	2	5th (of 9)
1919	2nd Grade	8	6	1	1	86	26	+60	13	1st (of 10)
Total	-	45	22	3	20	472	326	+146	47	
