= Avondale League Football Club =

Defunct NZ rugby league club, based in Auckland

Avondale
Club information
- Full name: Avondale League Football Club
- Short name: Avondale
- Colours: Green with a red band
- Founded: 1930
- Exited: 1958

Former details
- Grounds: Avondale Racecourse; Walker Park
- Competition: Auckland Rugby League

Avondale League Football Club were a rugby league club in Auckland. They competed from 1930 until about 1958. They represented the Avondale suburb in Auckland. Avondale was considered part of West Auckland in the early decades but due to suburban expansion is now considered a more central suburb albeit on the western fringe. For much of their history they played and trained at the Avondale Racecourse and in some early years on a nearby ground close to the Avondale town centre while also playing at Walker Park in Point Chevalier some years.

== History ==
=== 1930 (Origins) ===
Avondale in approximately 1930 with the Avondale Racecourse in the distance.

The first ever notice for the Avondale league club prior to their formation and choosing "Avondale" as their name.

The first appearance of the Avondale rugby league club was in the Auckland Star on March 8, 1930. An advertisement was posted headed “Suburbs League Football Club” and it said: A meeting of those interested in forming a League Club will be held in Hick's Tearooms, Fearon's Corner, Avondale, on March 10, at 8pm. Interested players from City and Suburbs requested to attend” and was placed by T. Herring, the temporary secretary. The meeting was reported on and it was revealed that the club would be known as the ‘Avondale League Football Club’. The initial name of Suburbs was the name which the local rugby club was known by. About 75 people were in attendance, with those present deciding to form the club. A committee was formed “to get the club going”. From the Auckland Rugby League, Ivan Culpan, Tom Davis, and Adamson were present and they congratulated the conveners of the meeting on having such a large attendance. They also made a promise that half of the matches which featured Avondale would be played locally. They decided that they would enter teams in the fourth, fifth, and sixth grades. The new club also decided on their colours which were to be green with a red band.

Avondale Racecourse's sports fields in the centre of the track which have been used for rugby league, rugby union, football, and cricket for over a century.

The following week another meeting was held to elect officers. The secretary stated that “the club was not in anyway antagonistic to existing rugby club, but hoped these was room for both forms of game in the district”.

William John Tait, the mayor of Avondale from 1924-27, who donated balls to the club in their first season.

Messrs. W.J. Tait, Henry P. Burton, and P. Wood donated footballs while medals were also donated for schoolboy and 6B teams by Mr. McFeat and an anonymous donor. The club also stated that the would hold their first practice on the Avondale Racecourse on Saturday, March 22. W.J. Tait, who donated footballs was William John Tait, the 2nd mayor of Avondale (1923–1927) and has Tait Park on Rosebank Road-Ash Street corner named after him along with Tait Street. At the time he was a local land agent, businessman and president of the Avondale Businessmen's Association. The Sun newspaper reported the details of the recent meeting but added that Mr. Burton had given the club a ground on Great North Road, “right in the centre of the shopping area, which will greatly facilitate training”. Another meeting was held in their “Club Rooms” at the rear of Watson's Shop in Avondale on Monday, 14 April.

The club ultimately fielded teams in the Third Open, Fourth, Sixth B, and Schoolboys grades. Their first games saw the third open side play against Glen Lynn at New Lynn on May 3. They lost 30 to 5. The fourth grade side had a 10–5 win over Glen Lynn at their Avondale ground at 3pm. The fifth grade team had a bye while the sixth grade B team played Ellerslie United at Avondale. Their schoolboy side played their first game against Parnell schoolboys at Carlaw Park on May 17. While an Avondale Convent schoolboys side also played a game against Ellerslie schoolboys at Avondale. The Avondale Public School team struggled through the season with no recorded wins though the Avondale Convent School finished third in their section. For their May 17 games they published all 5 team lists.

On Saturday, May 31 the club held a dance at the Oddfellow's Hall, St George's Road. The Sun newspaper provided a list of those present and their attire as was the habit of the day. At this stage of the season the club asked the Avondale Jockey Club, which had control of the Avondale Racecourse if they would use a sports field on the racecourse but were told that they had all been granted to the Auckland Rugby Union “and had been so for a number of years”. One of the Auckland Rugby League committee members commented that one field was never used. On September 13 a series of House Matches were played with a team named Avondale playing against Wallace Plaster Company at Avondale.

In late September the Auckland Rugby League schoolboys competition played two trial matches between an A Team and B Team and a Probables side against a Possibles side. The B Team featured Tierney from the Avondale Convent side, while the Probables team contained Gildard and Hall, and the Possibles team, Davis and Mee all from the Avondale Public School side. Following the two games there were two teams chosen to play an exhibition match. In the B Team was Tierney, the Avondale Convent player. To conclude their first season the Avondale club, at the December 10 Auckland Rugby League management meeting wrote requesting a donation towards its ground fund. The request was referred to the chairman and secretary for further consideration.

=== 1930s ===
The 1931 season saw them field a fourth grade team and a schoolboys side. Their annual meeting was once again at Hick's Tearooms in Avondale on Wednesday, March 25 and saw H. Howie as their honorary secretary. There were said to be about 20 players in attendance and their financial report showed a credit balance of £7 10/8. The club voted to thank Henry P. Burton for the use of his ground on which they played the majority of their home matches. The fourth grade team struggled and lost most of its games finishing towards the bottom of the standings, while the schoolboy side lost 4 of the 5 games that had results reported. Despite this they had four players named in the Auckland school representative team to play South Auckland (Waikato) in Ngāruawāhia. In October a schoolboy exhibition match was arranged between a City team and a Suburbs team as a curtain-raiser at Carlaw Park to the Eastern Suburbs (Sydney) – Devonport United match.

The 1932 season saw Avondale only field a single team which was an Avondale Schools side. They finished 4th of 9 teams with 8 wins and 5 losses known. In August a schoolboys trial match was played between a Probables and Possibles team with Stenberg and Courtney in the Possibles, and Geldard in the Probables.

In 1933 Avondale won their first championship. They fielded a sixth grade team and a schoolboys side. The sixth grade team lost all of their games and only scored 16 points while conceding 194 from their 12 matches. However the schoolboys side won at least nine of their 11 matches to win the Walmsley Shield for taking out the championship. They had to beat City schoolboys in the final on July 29 and did so by 6 points to 3. After the game an Auckland representative trial match was chosen between A and B teams. The A Team won 3 points to 0 and then the Auckland schoolboys representative team was selected to play Northland schoolboys with Carr and Mirko chosen on the wings, Robert Reid in the five eighths, and Green in the back reserves.

Robert Reid's funeral procession.

In 1934 the schoolboy side repeated their feat, winning the championship, which was now for the Newport Shield. They played 17 games, winning 15, and losing 2, scoring 230 points and conceding 20. The championship final was played against Richmond schoolboys on September 22 on the Carlaw Park #1 field. It was one of the curtain-raisers to the Western Suburbs (Sydney) match against Marist Old Boys. Richmond had won a game between the sides the week prior 5-0 which saw the two teams level at the top of the championship, but Avondale won this match 5-3 “in a good game” to claim the title for the second straight season. They also won the Ernest Davis Cup for winning the knockout competition when they beat Marist A in the final on October 20. The game was part of the Charity Day games and was the main feature. The same day Avondale played Marist for the inaugural Robert Reid Memorial Shield which was in honour of their player who had died aged 15 three weeks prior. Reid had received a large funeral with his rugby league and cricket teammates leading the procession from his home in New North Road to Waikumete Cemetery.

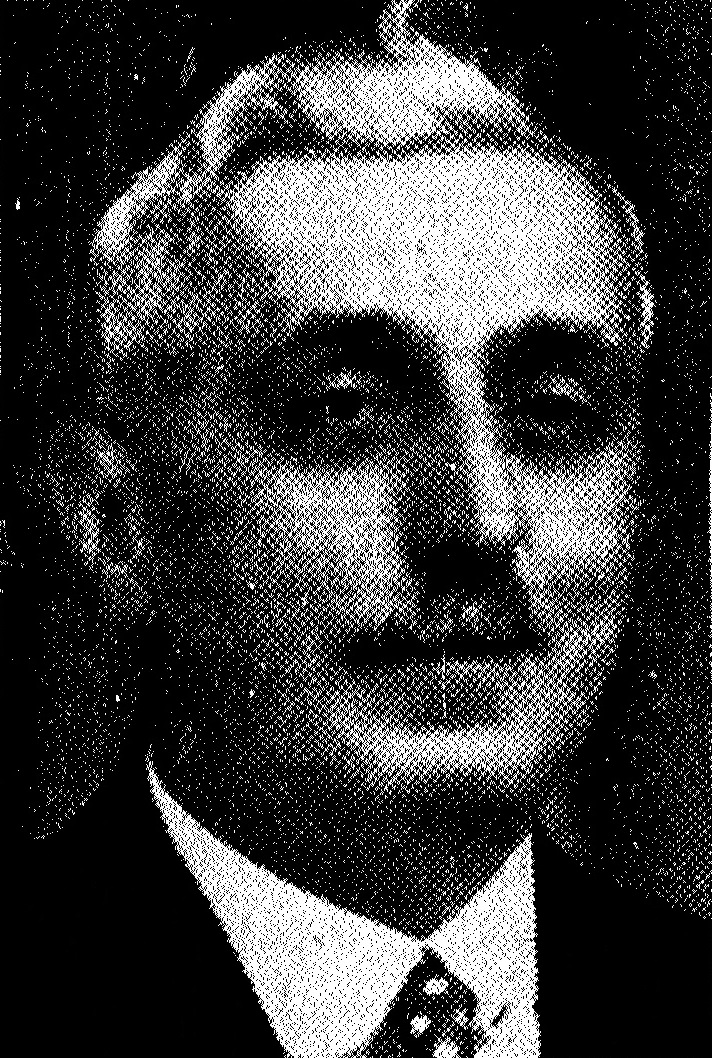
Joe Sayegh

The 1935, 1936, and 1937 seasons saw Avondale remain focused on the schoolboy grades. They did however field teams in the seventh grade, sixth grade, and fifth grade in those seasons respectively. With the growth of the schoolboys competition from one grade to three they began to field more schoolboy sides. The Avondale Convent (St Mary's School) also fielded teams once more, with one in 1935 and 1936, and two in 1937. In mid March 1935 the club held a social at the Oddfellow's Hall in Avondale. A. Stanley, the Auckland RL primary schools chairman presided and gave out prizes won during the previous year. The fifth grade team in 1937 lost the knockout final to City, while the same year the intermediate schoolboys team lost the championship final to Ponsonby United schoolboys 3–0 on August 21. At the end of the season the club held a schoolboys’ evening with over 200 guests in attendance at the Oddfellows’ Hall. Joe Sayegh presented “various cups and medals won during the season and each boy received a team photo and a cap”. L. Rout, the secretary of the ARL schools’ management committee congratulated the players and “on behalf of the team presented tokens of appreciation to R. Bunce (coach), and H. Green (secretary).

In 1938 the club grew to field a third grade, sixth grade, and three schoolboys sides. They played their home matches at Walker Park in Point Chevalier. In early June the club announced the formation of a junior officers’ club whose aim was to collaborate with the Auckland Rugby League in “any matters for the good of the game”. N. Green made the Auckland schoolboy representative side to play South Auckland schoolboys (Waikato) on September 3. Then in early October the club held a dance in honour of the visiting team from Whangarei at the Oddfellows’ Hall. At the conclusion of the season the club held their annual picnic at Tui Glen in Henderson on Saturday, December 10. There were 150 people present with various games held.

In 1939 the Avondale club wrote to the New Lynn Board asking for the use of the New Lynn Domain ground for rugby league for the season. The council said that they would advise the club on the size of the ground and give favourable consideration if the ground was suitable. They fielded teams in the Third grade and Fifth grade, with senior and intermediate schoolboy sides also. The Fifth grade team won the championship when they beat Point Chevalier 8 points to 3 on August 19 at walker Park in Point Chevalier in what turned out to be their last regular season match. The Auckland Rugby League decided to award them the championship after their midweek meeting as they were in an “unbeatable position”. The Avondale club did not end up playing their matches on the New Lynn ground and instead played their home games at the Avondale Racecourse. In mid June the club held a fancy dress dance to raise funds for their candidate in the schoolboys’ queen competition.

=== 1940s ===
Avondale continued playing at the Avondale Racecourse in 1940 and had teams in the Third, Fourth, and Intermediate Schoolboys grades. The Third grade and Intermediate Schoolboys sides struggled and did not win many games though the Fourth grade team won most of their matches and finished in the top four in a ten team competition. For the purposes of organising an Auckland junior representative side a trial match was arranged and Avondale was placed in the Country section. One of the fourth grade players, Victor Vivian Selwyn was recruited by the Manukau club and joined their senior side, replacing Peter Mahima who was joining the armed forces for the war effort. He went on to play about nine senior games for them and scored one try. At the final ARL meeting of the season a gold medal was presented by James Fairfield Wills Dickson (J.F.W. Dickson medal) to Ray Dormer of the Avondale club as the best conducted junior player in Auckland.

The 1941 season had Avondale field just one junior side in the fourth grade, and two schoolboy teams. World War 2 was fully underway and many clubs were struggling to field sides due to so many players involved in the war effort. The club held their annual meeting in St. Jude's Street Hall on Tuesday, April 1 at 8pm with H. Green the honorary secretary. The fourth grade side only had four results reported, two wins, a draw, and a loss. The senior schoolboys side appeared to struggle, losing most of their games, though the intermediate side won three and drew one of their six reported matches. In mid May it was reported that Sergeant-Pilot John David Long, a member of their third grade side of 1939 was missing on air operations.

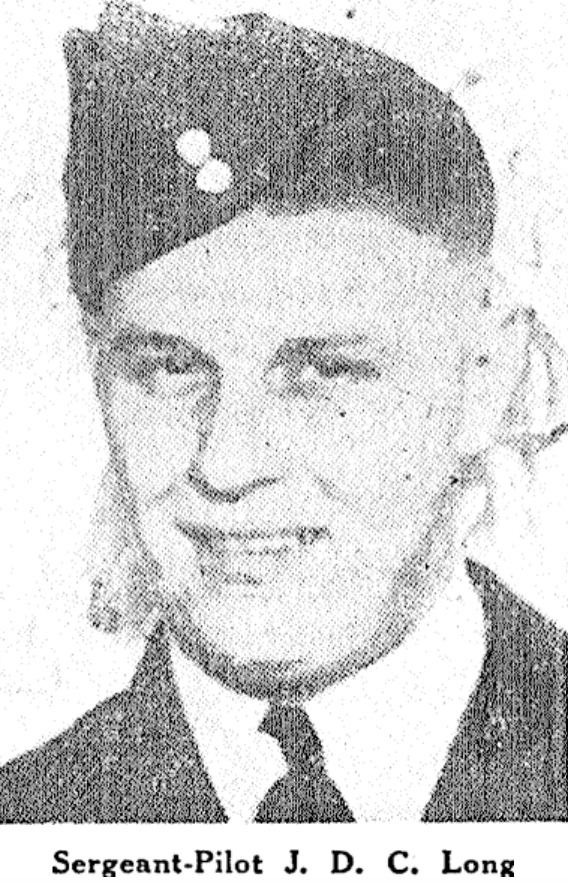

It was later confirmed that he had been killed on May 11, 1941, during an air raid on Hamburg, Germany. His name is on the Otahuhu Railway Workshops War Memorial on the corner of Piki Thompson Way in Ōtāhuhu, Auckland.

At the beginning of the season, Green, who had played for Avondale, debuted for the Newton Rangers senior side and went on to play 17 games for them in the same season. In August the Auckland Intermediate schoolboy representative team was selected to play South Auckland schoolboys in Huntly. The team featured the two Dunn brothers from the Avondale schoolboys. Then in October an Auckland Senior schoolboys team was chosen to defend the Golden Bloom Banner against the South Auckland schoolboys. With the side featuring M. Daly in the backs and J. Allen in the forwards from the Avondale side.

By the 1942 season Avondale fielded a schoolboy side and at least one junior side but there was little coverage of the code in the lower grades during this time. Prior to the season starting Avondale lost another of its players to the war effort

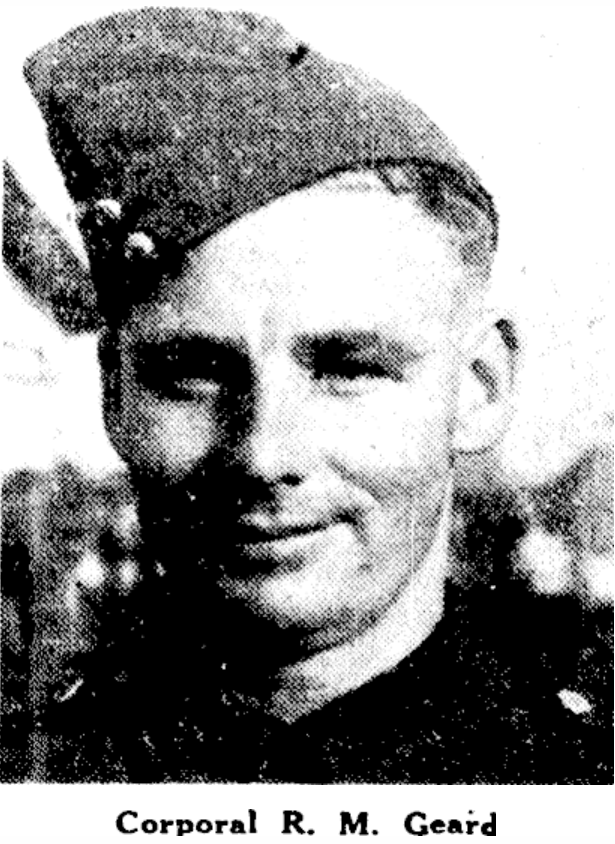

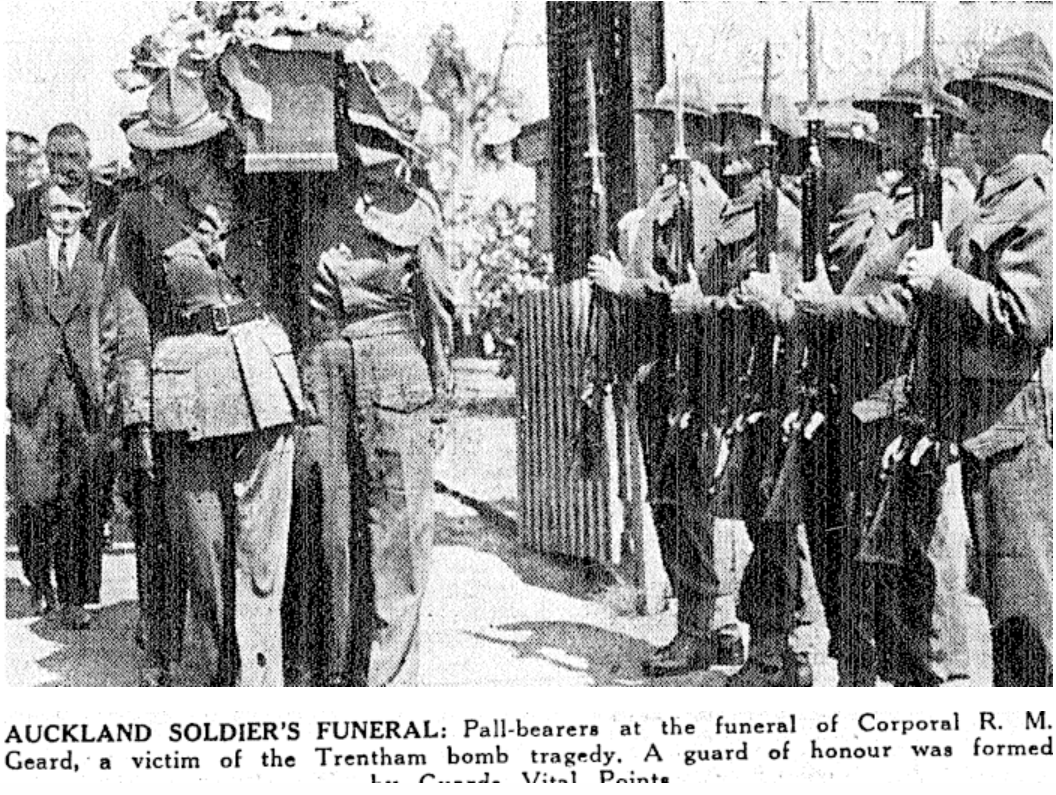

On February 7, Avondale junior player, Richard Mark Geard was killed accidentally by a bomb explosion at Trentham Military Camp after he had been a member of the territorials for four months. His death occurred during a demonstration being given to a class of officers and non-commissioned officers undergoing instruction in the practical use of bombs. He was buried at Waikumete Cemetery in Glen Eden, Auckland. At the end of the 1942 season the Auckland junior representative team was chosen to play against Waikato juniors on August 22. From the Avondale club Godfrey and Redfern were selected.

Avondale Racecourse in July, 1947.

In 1943 Avondale held their annual meeting on April 6 in the Labour Party's rooms on St. George's Road in Avondale with their honorary secretary, H.W. Girven posting a notice for it in the newspapers. It requested that all intending players and supporters attend and ultimately the club fielded teams in the fourth and fifth grades. In 1944 they held their annual meeting at the same venue on April 27 with Green still their secretary. On July 26 Roy Leslie Priaulx, an Avondale player died suddenly in Italy. He was buried at Florence War Cemetery. He is memorialised at the Auckland War Memorial Museum in the World War II Hall of Memories. On August 19 his parents thanked the Avondale rugby league club for their messages of sympathy.

The Avondale Town Hall in modern times.

Their 1945 annual meeting was held in the Avondale Town Hall on March 22.

The Avondale club continued to play rugby league in the Avondale suburb until approximately the late 1950s when the cub folded. Then the Blockhouse Bay club formed and was run initially out of the Glenavon School before later moving to the Blockhouse Bay Reserve. A club also formed in Mount Roskill in the 1950s and they later merged with Blockhouse Bay in 1979 to form the Bay Roskill Vikings. In 1985 the Avondale Wolves club formed and they lasted until 1996 after being affiliated with Bay Roskill. They played games at Eastdale Reserve adjacent to Avondale College and had juniors such as Tony Tatupu and Karmichael Hunt play for them. The club briefly returned to play in the early 2020s and were affiliated with the Marist Saints club.
