= 1925 Auckland Rugby League season =

The 1925 season of Auckland Rugby League was its 16th. On 30 March Auckland Rugby League held its fifteenth annual meeting with 200 in attendance. The strong financial position of the league was commented on. It was also decided that if possible the Senior Grade would be split into A and B divisions owing to the increasing number of teams who wished to enter but also the gap in standard between the best teams and the worst.

Preceded by 1924	17th Auckland Rugby League season 1925	Succeeded by 1926

== Auckland Rugby League news ==
=== Club teams by grade participation ===
Leys Institute were a 6th grade side and were affiliated with the Ponsonby club.

Team	1st Grade	B Grade	2nd Grade	3rd Grade	4th Grade	5th Grade	6th Grade A	6th Grade B	Total
Richmond Rovers	1	0	1	1	1	1	1	2	8
Ponsonby United	1	0	2	2	1	1	0	0	7
City Rovers	1	0	1	1	0	1	1	1	6
Ellerslie United	0	1	1	0	1	1	1	1	6
Newton Rangers	1	0	1	1	1	0	1	0	5
Devonport United	1	0	1	1	1	0	1	0	5
Marist Old Boys	1	0	0	0	2	1	1	0	5
Athletic	1	0	0	1	1	1	0	1	5
Māngere United	0	1	1	1	1	0	0	0	4
Kingsland Rovers	0	1	1	1	1	0	0	0	4
Northcote & Birkenhead Ramblers	0	1	0	1	0	1	0	1	4
United Suburbs	0	0	1	2	0	0	0	1	4
Parnell	0	0	0	1	1	1	0	0	3
Point Chevalier	0	0	0	1	1	0	0	1	3
Otahuhu Rovers	0	1	0	1	0	0	0	0	2
New Lynn	0	0	0	1	0	1	0	0	2
Coromandel Old Boys	0	0	0	1	0	0	0	0	1
Leys Institute (Ponsonby)	0	0	0	0	0	0	1	0	1
Total	7	5	10	17	12	9	7	8	75

=== Trophy winners ===
City Rovers won the First Grade Championship for the 7th time in just 15 seasons. Ponsonby won the Roope Rooster Knockout competition for the 4th time in the 11 seasons it had been competed for. Ponsonby also won the Stormont Shield after defeating City in the final in its inaugural season.

While in the B division Ellerslie won the inaugural title and were awarded the Norton Cup. At the end of the season these teams competed for their own knockout trophy which was named the Stallard Cup. It was won by Otahuhu who defeated Northcote in the final.

In the lower grades, the Richmond Rovers prevailed. They won the 2nd grade, 3rd grade, and both sections of the 6th grade. They were a very powerful club at the junior level and this would ultimately lead to great success at the senior grade level.

=== Representative season ===
The Auckland team played in 5 matches with a number of other Auckland B and Auckland C team matches. They played against the New Zealand team twice and the touring Queensland side who they drew with 18 all. The Auckland side claimed the Northern Union Challenge Cup off the holders, South Auckland and they retained it against the same opponents in a later match. In addition the Auckland Provincial team played Queensland but were soundly beaten 54–14.

=== Death of Bill Stormont and inauguration of the Stormont Shield ===
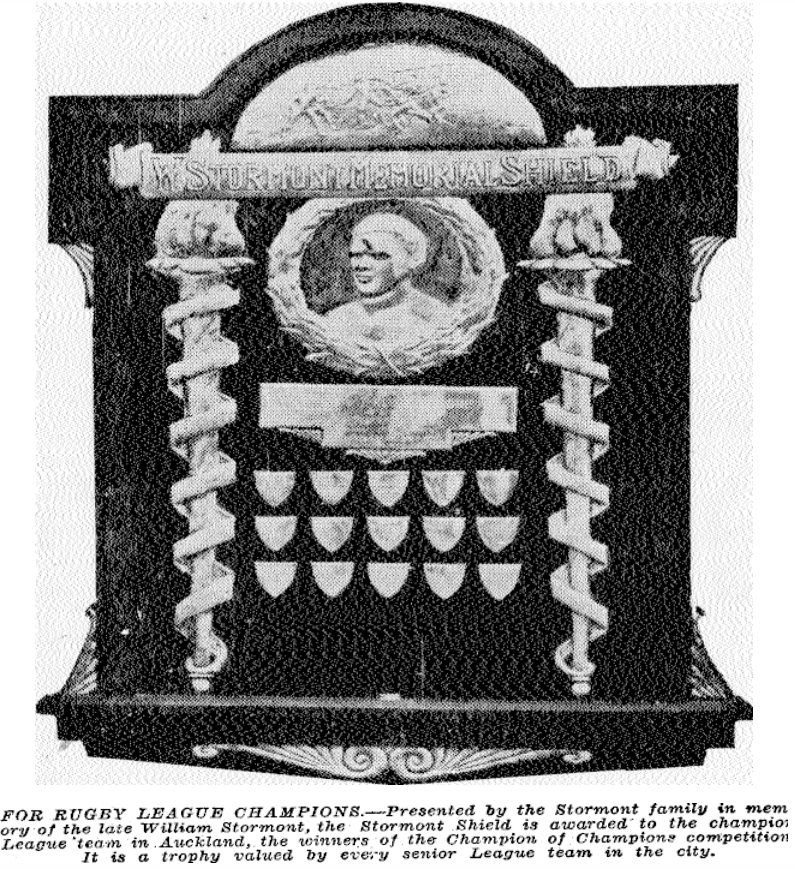
The Stormont Shield

On 4 June William Stormont (known better as Bill Stormont) died, succumbing to rheumatic heart disease. Stormont had played for the Marist Old Boys senior team from 1920 to 1924 scoring 24 tries and kicking 31 goals. He had also represented Auckland on 16 occasions, scoring 4 tries and kicking 2 goals as well as playing 3 matches for New Zealand in 1920. He had been ill for quite some time and had not played for Marist since the end of the 1924 season. The funeral was on the Sunday leaving his parents residence in Epsom and progressing to Purewa Cemetery where he was buried. The match between Marist and Richmond Rovers on Saturday was originally postponed but was never played. The matches at Carlaw Park saw one minutes silence before kickoff. On 9 July at the New Zealand Council meeting John Stormont presented a shield to be played for among the senior clubs. It was to be known as the “William Stormont Memorial Shield”.

On 22 July at an Auckland Management Committee meeting it was decided that the shield would be played for by the “winners of the senior grade club competition and the winners of the Roope Rooster”. A request came in for the trophy to be played for among champion teams from around the country but it was eventually settled that it would be for Auckland teams. The championship winning City Rovers team, the Roope Rooster winning Ponsonby United, and Stormont's Marist side were the three teams chosen to compete for it. City drew the bye so Ponsonby were to come up against Marist in the ‘semi-final’ match. Ponsonby defeated Marist 23–22 to progress to the Stormont Shield final. Ponsonby then trounced City Rovers 35–3 in the final to become the first team with their name on the trophy. The Stormont Shield is still played for today though it is played for in round 1 of the regular season with the Fox Memorial grand finalists from the previous year competing for it.

== Monteith Shield (first grade championship) ==
=== Monteith Shield standings ===
Team	Pld	W	D	L	F	A	Pts
City Rovers	12	11	0	1	300	140	22
Ponsonby United	12	10	0	2	271	113	20
Marist Old Boys	11	6	0	5	162	112	12
Devonport United	12	5	0	7	172	207	10
Richmond Rovers	11	4	0	7	155	184	8
Athletic	12	4	0	8	133	276	8
Newton Rangers	12	1	0	11	152	314	2

=== Monteith Shield fixtures ===
==== Round 1 ====
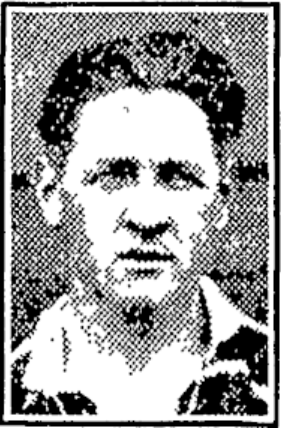
Ivan Littlewood

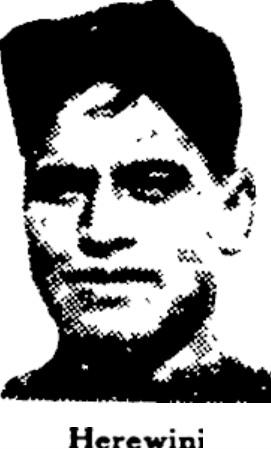
M Herewini

M Herewini debuted for Ponsonby at fullback. He transferred to Newton the following season and played many years of senior grade over the ensuing years. Ivan Littlewood scored two tries for Ponsonby but they still lost heavily to City who scored seven tries including four to current New Zealand internationals Lou Brown (2), and Maurice Wetherill, and future international Alf Townsend. For Athletic Craddock Dufty scored three tries and kicked seven goals in their 38–18 win over Newton.

18 April	City	27–8	Ponsonby	Carlaw Park 1
3:00	Try: James Wardlaw 2, Alf Townsend, Lou Brown 2, Harry Hawkes, Maurice Wetherill; Con: Harry Hawkes, Selby Crewther; Drop: Ben Davidson		Try: Ivan Littlewood 2 Con: Frank Delgrosso	Attendance: 5,000; Referee: Les Bull

18 April	Athletic	38–18	Newton	Carlaw Park 2
3:00	Try: Bert Avery, Craddock Dufty 3, John Lang, Joe Hadley, Wilson Hall 2 Con: Craddock Dufty 6 Pen: Craddock Dufty		Try: A Watson, K Gallagher, Alan Clarke, Victor Humby; Con: Arthur Mansill 2, Alan Clarke	Attendance: 5,000; Referee: William Mincham

18 April	Devonport	29–9	Richmond	Devonport Domain
3:00	Try: Norman Veart 2, Horace Dixon, Allan Seagar, Julius Laing, Stan Webb, Harry Douglas; Con: Charles Hand, Stan Webb, Allan Seagar, Alf Scott		Try: Sonny Hing 2, Bill Davis	Referee: A Saunders

==== Round 2 ====
A good deal of ill feeling was shown in the Marist v Devonport game at the Devonport Domain, perhaps a hangover from their controversial championship final the year before when player eligibility had dragged on for some time afterwards. In comments later in the week the Auckland Star described the match as "brutal" with much "illegal and unsportsmanlike play". Charles Gregory and Arthur Cadman of the Marist side were both ordered off in the second half but they still won 18 to 9. It was said that the crowd had threatened to run the field and even after the sendings off the game "developed into something of a melee". In the match between City and Athletic Alf Townsend was also ordered off in the second half for City, and then winger Ernest Ruby left injured leaving City with 11 players to finish the match but they led 16-8 and still managed to add another try when Lou Brown followed up a kick which new Athletic fullback Tommy Taylor failed to field. Townsend and Cadman were suspended by the league with their respective clubs appealing the decision and the ARL forwarded the appeals to the New Zealand Council (NZRL). The appeals were dismissed by the national body. In Ponsonby's win over Richmond, Tim Peckham who had just joined the side, scored one of their tries. Late in the game Richmond were awarded a try after W Little was obstructed when attempting to score. At this time obstruction tries were awarded to the player in question. Ray Hyland scored the other three tries for Richmond.

2 May	City	19–8	Athletic	Carlaw Park 1
3:00	Try: J Wardlaw, Lou Brown 3, Hec McDonald; Con: W Sandham 2		Try: Joe Hadley, Bert Avery; Pen: Craddock Dufty	Referee: Les Bull

2 May	Ponsonby	18–14	Richmond	Carlaw Park 2
3:00	Try: Hector Cole 2, H Goodley, Tim Peckham; Con: Frank Delgrosso 2 Pen: Frank Delgrosso		Try: Ray Hyland 3, W Little (obstruction try); Con: Trevor Hanlon	Referee: A Saunders

2 May	Marist	18–9	Devonport	Devonport Domain
3:00	Try: Arthur Cadman, Percy Gallagher, Jack Kirwan, Hec Brisbane; Con: Charles Gregory 3		Try: Alf Harper, Norman Veart, Harry Douglas	Referee: William Mincham

==== Round 3 ====
9 May	Marist	8–7	Ponsonby	Carlaw Park 1
3:00	Try: Percy Gallagher, Jack Kirwan; Con: Charles Gregory		Try: Sam Lowrie; Con: Frank Delgrosso; Pen: Frank Delgrosso	Attendance: 6,000; Referee: Taylor

9 May	City	43–19	Newton	Carlaw Park 2
3:00	Try: J Wardlaw 2, Lou Brown 3, Hec McDonald, Ben Davidson, Ernie Mackie, Selby Crewther, Ernest Ruby, Nelson Bass; Con: W Sandham 2, Ernie Mackie, Vic Thomas, Maurice Wetherill		Try: E Thompson, Alan Clarke, H Anderson, A Watson, Wally Somers; Con: Clarrie Polson 2	Attendance: 6,000; Referee: Robert A. Bovaird

9 May	Athletic	13–8	Richmond	Auckland Domain 1
3:00	Try: Jones, Joe Hadley, Charles Webb; Con: Craddock Dufty 2		Try: W Little, Ken Hyland; Con: Trevor Hanlon	Referee: McCowatt

==== Round 4 ====
Sam Lowrie was ordered off in the match between Ponsonby and Devonport. Julius Laing of Devonport was taken to hospital suffering from slight concussion. It was rumoured during the week that his brother, Bert Laing had retired from the sport but he soon resumed playing and retired at the end of the 1926 season, though he came out of retirement to assist the side in 1927 a couple of times and then four more times in 1930. W Hannan had joined the Marist forward pack and was a brother of champion rower Pat Hannan.

16 May	Ponsonby	40–5	Devonport	Carlaw Park 1
3:00	Try: Frank Delgrosso 3, Ivan Littlewood 2, George Gardiner, Bert Payne 2, Hector Cole, Victor Fagan; Con: Frank Delgrosso 4 Pen: Frank Delgrosso		Try: Jim O'Brien; Con: Julius Laing	Attendance: 8,000; Referee: Percy Rogers

16 May	Marist	18–5	Athletic	Carlaw Park 2
3:00	Try: Arthur Singe 3, Reg Malloy; Con: Charles Gregory 3		Try: Craddock Dufty; Con: Craddock Dufty	Attendance: 8,000; Referee: Saunders

16 May	Richmond	21–9	Newton	Victoria Park 1
3:00	Try: Avery, Kettlewell 3, W Hanlon; Con: W Hanlon 2 Pen: W Hanlon		Try: H Anderson; Con: Alan Clarke; Pen: Alan Clarke 2	Referee: McCowatt

==== Round 5 ====
23 May	Athletic	8–6	Devonport	Carlaw Park 1
3:00	Try: Ernie Herring 2 Pen: Craddock Dufty		Try: Alf Scott, Stanley Butland	Referee: McCowatt

23 May	City	17–0	Richmond	Carlaw Park 2
3:00	Try: Hec McDonald 2, Lou Brown 2, Selby Crewther; Con: Selby Crewther			Referee: Les Bull

23 May	Marist	18–0	Newton	Auckland Domain
3:00	Try: Hec Brisbane 2, Reg Malloy, Arthur Singe; Con: Charles Gregory 2 Pen: Charles Gregory			Referee: Hill

==== Round 6 ====
The City - Marist match ended sensationally. With the scores tied at 7, and time up with the time keeper standing with the bell in hand waiting for the ball to go out of play, Ben Davidson drop kicked a goal for City to win 9–7. An enormous crowd of 12,500 was on hand to witness the match which was a club record for a regular season match to this point. The crowd was said to be "at a high pitch of excitement" throughout each half.

30 May	City	9–7	Marist	Carlaw Park 1
3:00	Try: Chook Mitchell; Con: W Sandham; Pen: W Sandham; Drop: Ben Davidson		Try: Jack Kirwan; Con: Charles Gregory; Pen: Charles Gregory	Attendance: 12,500; Referee: Walter Ripley

30 May	Ponsonby	18–6	Athletic	Carlaw Park 2
3:00	Try: Frank Delgrosso, Bert Payne, Ivan Littlewood, Hector Cole; Pen: Frank Delgrosso 3		Try: Charles Webb, John McGregor	Attendance: 12,500; Referee: Taylor

30 May	Devonport	29–11	Newton	Devonport Domain
3:00	Try: Bert Laing, Hooker, Stan Webb 2, Jim O'Brien, Bill Cleaver, Horace Dixon; Con: Bert Laing 3 Pen: Bert Laing		Try: Roy Hardgrave, H Anderson, Alan Clarke; Con: Clarrie Polson	Referee: Les Bull

==== Round 7 ====
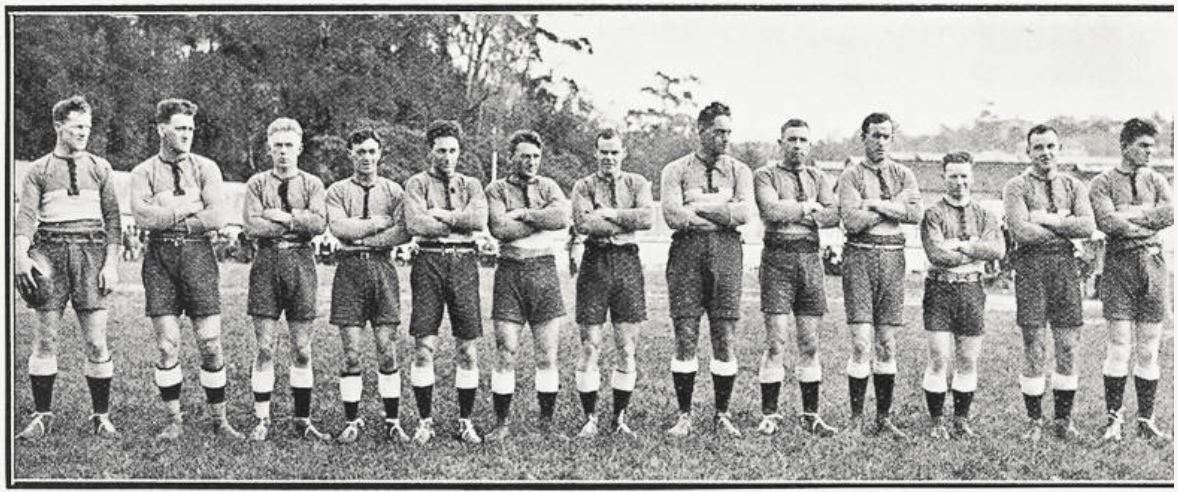
Bill Stormont on the extreme right in the Auckland team to play England in 1924.

Prior to the kickoff teams stood in silence for one minute as a mark of respect for the late William Stormont of the Marist club who had died two days earlier. He was a World War I veteran and had played for Marist from 1920 to 1924. The match between Marist and Richmond scheduled to be played at Victoria Park was cancelled due to his death. The 39 year old,Tom Haddon returned to the field for the first time since 1919, the year in which he represented New Zealand. From 1910 to 1919 he played for North Shore (Devonport), Grafton Athletic, and City though spent 2–3 years at war in between. He scored a try in Devonport's 27–20 loss to City. Ponsonby thrashed Newton 42–3 after leading 37–0 at halftime. Ponsonby scored shortly after halftime and then when Newton had spent a period of play on attack, crossing for a try they decided that they had had enough and the game was called.

6 June	City	27–20	Devonport	Carlaw Park 1
3:00	Try: Harry Hawkes, Maurice Wetherill, Lou Brown 3, E Brown, Ernie Mackie; Con: W Sandham 2 Pen: W Sandham		Try: Jim O'Brien, Julius Laing, Tom Haddon, Horace Dixon; Con: Bert Laing 3 Pen: Bert Laing	Referee: Les Bull

6 June	Ponsonby	42–3	Newton	Carlaw Park 2
3:00	Try: Frank Delgrosso 4, George Gardiner, Tim Peckham, Ivan Littlewood 2, Bert Payne, Hector Cole; Con: Frank Delgrosso 4, Tim Peckham, Hector Cole		Try: J Lawson	Referee: Percy Rogers

6 June	Marist	Cancelled	Richmond	Victoria Park 1
3:00				Referee: Saunders

==== Round 8 ====
In the main match at Carlaw Park before a crowd of 10,000 City scored on full time however W Sandham missed a relatively easy conversion which would have given them the win. Instead Ponsonby inflicted their first defeat of the year. Charles Hand kicked 6 goals on debut for Newton after transferring mid week from Devonport. Newton's easy win over Athletic was surprising as they had been struggling recently. Athletic were missing their star back, Craddock Dufty who did not play owing to an injured hand.

13 June	Ponsonby	10–9	City	Carlaw Park 1
3:00	Try: Bert Payne, Ivan Littlewood; Con: Frank Delgrosso 2		Try: Selby Crewther, Hec McDonald 2	Attendance: 10,000; Referee: Walter Ripley

13 June	Richmond	23–5	Devonport	Carlaw Park 1
3:00	Try: Thorburn, Ray Hyland, William Hanlon, Frederick Bass, M Little; Con: McDonald 2 Pen: Trevor Hanlon, W Hanlon		Try: Horace Dixon; Con: Bert Laing	Attendance: 10,000; Referee: Saunders

13 June	Newton	38–11	Athletic	Victoria Park
3:00	Try: Clarrie Polson, Roy Hardgrave 2, Wally Somers 2, Robert Stack, C Brown, Alan Clarke; Con: Charles Hand 6, E Thompson		Try: Ernie Herring, A Watkins, Bert Avery; Con: Ernie Herring	Referee: Hill

==== Round 9 ====
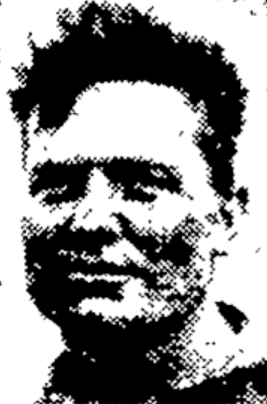
Jim O'Brien (Marist)

In one of the more amazing team efforts in early Auckland rugby league history the City team saw all 13 of its players score points in a 57–10 victory over Athletic. The loss was the heaviest ever against Athletic. There were nine different try scorers and the four who didn't cross the line all kicked at least one conversion. The match perhaps somewhat anti-climatically took place on the number 2 field. There were 9,000 in attendance at Carlaw Park but the majority would have been watching the match on the number 1 field at the time where Marist beat Devonport 19–11. Jim O'Brien for Marist and Tom Haddon for Devonport were ordered off for fighting in their match at Carlaw Park.

20 June	Devonport	19–11	Marist	Carlaw Park 1
2:45	Try: Jim O'Brien, Tom Haddon, Stan Webb; Con: Julius Laing; Pen: Bert Laing 4		Try: Hec Brisbane, Reg Malloy, Percy Gallagher; Con: Charles Gregory	Attendance: 9,000; Referee: Taylor

20 June	City	57–10	Athletic	Carlaw Park 2
2:45	Try: Lou Brown 4, George Paki, Ernest Ruby 2, J Wardlaw 2, Hec McDonald, Selby Crewther, Harry Hawkes, Ernie Mackie, Alf Townsend; Con: Nelson Bass 3, E Brown, Harry Hawkes, Ernie Mackie, Alf Townsend, Ben Davidson, Bob Crewther		Try: Bert Avery, Len Mason; Con: Craddock Dufty; Pen: Angelo	Attendance: 9,000; Referee: A Saunders

20 June	Ponsonby	14–7	Richmond	Auckland Domain 1
3:00	Try: Ivan Littlewood 2, Joseph Peckham, Frank Delgrosso; Pen: Frank Delgrosso		Try: W Little; Con: McDonald; Pen: McDonald	Referee: McCowatt

==== Round 10 ====
All of the teams were without their New Zealand representatives who had departed for their Australian tour. The touring party included 15 Auckland club players. George Davidson played his first game of the season for City, ostensibly replacing his brother Ben in the back line who was rested with an injured foot. He scored a try in their 27–16 win over Newton. Wilfred McNeil also made his first appearance of the year for Ponsonby in their 24–6 win over Marist. He hooked in the place of Sam Lowrie who was in Australia.

4 July	Ponsonby	24–6	Marist	Carlaw Park 1
2:45	Try: Leonard Riley, Dooley Moore 2, George Gardiner, Ivan Littlewood, Len Ward; Con: Hector Cole, George Gardiner, Tim Peckham		Try: Jim Johnson, Horace Hanson	Attendance: 6,000; Referee: Gallagher

4 July	Athletic	16–15	Richmond	Carlaw Park 2
2:45	Try: Len Mason 2, Sorenson; Con: Angelo 2		Try: Ralph Jenkinson, W Little, Ray Hyland; Con: W Hanlon 2 Pen: W Hanlon	Attendance: 6,000; Referee: T Hill

4 July	City	27–16	Newton	Auckland Domain 2
3:00	Try: J Wardlaw, George Davidson, Nelson Bass, Harry Hawkes 2, Hec McDonald, Ernest Ruby; Con: W Sandham 3		Try: E Thompson, Charles Hand, Alan Clarke, Wally Somers; Con: Charles Hand 2	Referee: Wally Ripley

==== Round 11 ====
Matthew Kirkland scored 4 tries in Marist's 35–3 win over his former club, Athletic in greasy conditions at the Auckland Domain.

11 July	Ponsonby	22–5	Devonport	Carlaw Park 1
2:45	Try: Ivan Littlewood 2, Victor Fagan, George Gardiner, Leonard Riley, D Donovan; Con: George Gardiner, Dooley Moore		Try: Norm Veart; Con: Alf Scott	Referee: Billy Murray

11 July	Richmond	12–11	Newton	Carlaw Park 2
2:45	Try: Jack Redwood, William Hanlon; Con: McDonald 2 Pen: William Hanlon		Try: Alan Clarke, Charles Hand, Clarrie Polson; Con: Charles Hand	Referee: Les Bull

11 July	Marist	35–3	Athletic	Auckland Domain
3:00	Try: Horace Hanson, Matthew Kirkland 4, Mannix, Arthur Singe, Billy Ghent, Jim Johnson; Con: Arthur Singe 3, Jim Johnson		Try: McKinley	Referee: Taylor

==== Round 12 ====
At the Devonport Domain the local winger, Buffet had to deal with a dog crossing the field as he attempted to catch a ball. Athletic swooped on the moment with Len Mason scoring.

18 July	City	34–22	Richmond	Carlaw Park 1
2:45	Try: C Mitchell 2, J Wardlaw, Ben Davidson 2, George Davidson 3 Con: W Sandham 4 Pen: W Sandham		Try: William Hanlon 2, Ballantyne 2 Con: William Hanlon 3, Frederick Bass; Pen: William Hanlon	Referee: Robert A. Bovaird

18 July	Marist	19–6	Newton	Carlaw Park 2
2:45	Try: Billy Ghent, Con Lineen, W Kirkland, Reg Malloy, Lonergan, Jim Johnson; Con: Arthur Singe 2 Pen: Arthur Singe 2		Try: Alan Clarke, Wally Somers	Referee: A Saunders

18 July	Devonport	19–10	Athletic	Devonport Domain
3:00	Try: Stanley Butland, Tom Haddon 2, Norman Veart, Alf Scott; Con: Alf Scott, Neville St George		Try: Len Mason, Wilkie; Con: Angelo; Pen: Angelo	Referee: Les Bull

==== Round 13 ====
25 July	City	6–5	Marist	Carlaw Park 1
3:00	Try: Selby Crewther, James Wardlaw		Try: Arthur Singe; Pen: Arthur Singe	Attendance: 7,500; Referee: Billy Murray

25 July	Ponsonby	25–5	Athletic	Carlaw Park 2
3:00	Try: H Godley 3, Joseph Peckham, Leonard Riley 2, Bert Payne; Con: George Gardiner 2		Try: A Watkins; Pen: Malloy	Referee: Les Bull

25 July	Devonport	11–3	Newton	Victoria Park
3:00	Try: Norm Veart, Buffett, Ken Scott; Con: Julius Laing		Try: Warren	Referee: William Mincham

==== Round 14 ====
1 August	City	25–15	Devonport	Carlaw Park 1
3:00	Try: Hec McDonald, Selby Crewther, C Mitchell, Ben Davidson, George Davidson, Harry Hawkes, Ernest Ruby; Con: Selby Crewther, George Davidson		Try: Alf Scott, Norm Veart, Harry Douglas; Con: Alf Scott; Pen: Alf Scott, George Yardley	Attendance: 7,000; Referee: A Saunders

1 August	Richmond	24–17	Marist	Carlaw Park 2
3:00	Try: Russell 2, W Hanlon, George Duane 2, W Little; Con: W Hanlon 2 Pen: W Hanlon		Try: Arthur Singe 2, Jim Johnson 2, Percy Gallagher; Con: Billy Ghent	Attendance: 7,000; Referee: T Hill

1 August	Ponsonby	43–18	Newton	Auckland Domain 1
3:00	Try: H Goodley 2, George Gardiner 2, Leonard Riley 2, Ivan Littlewood, Bert Payne, Dooley Moore 2, D Donovan; Con: George Gardiner, Ivan Littlewood, D Donovan, Unknown x 1 Pen: George Gardiner		Try: Charles Hand, Warren, Roy Hardgrave, Smith; Con: Charles Hand, Clarrie Polson, Wally Somers	Referee: Billy Murray

=== Roope Rooster knockout competition ===
==== Round 1 ====
George Gardiner had a field day for Ponsonby in their 50–23 win over Athletic. He scored three tries and converted seven of his sides twelve tries for 23 total points.

8 August	Devonport	15–12	Marist	Carlaw Park 1
3:00	Try: Alf Scott, Harry Douglas, Jim O'Brien; Con: Alf Scott; Pen: Alf Scott 2		Try: Horace Hanson, Bernard Sweeney, Lenihan, Percy Gallagher	Attendance: 4,000; Referee: Les Bull

8 August	Ponsonby	50–23	Athletic	Carlaw Park 1
3:00	Try: Joseph Peckham, George Gardiner 3, H Goodley 2, Leonard Riley, Wilfred McNeil, Ivan Littlewood, Herewini, D Donovan, Tim Peckham; Con: George Gardiner 7		Try: Charles Webb, Bill Te Whata, Len Mason, Wilkie, Joe Hadley; Con: Malloy 3 Pen: Malloy	Attendance: 4,000; Referee: Taylor

8 August	City	29–8	Richmond	Auckland Domain
3:00	Try: Selby Crewther, George Reid, James Wardlaw 2, Harry Hawkes 2, Ernest Ruby; Con: Selby Crewther 4		Try: Frederick Bass 2 Con: W Hanlon	Referee: T Hill

==== Semi finals ====
15 August	City	22–11	Devonport	Carlaw Park 1
3:00	Try: Ben Davidson 2, Harry Hawkes, James Wardlaw, George Davidson, Cleal; Con: Selby Crewther 2		Try: George Yardley, Ken Scott, Norm Veart; Con: George Yardley	Referee: Taylor

15 August	Ponsonby	WBD-LBD	Newton	Carlaw Park 2
3:00				Referee: McCowatt

==== Final ====
Ponsonby won their fourth Roope Rooster title following previous wins in 1917, 1922, and 1923. They score tries through Ivan Littlewood and Leonard Riley, older brother of Brian Riley. While George Gardiner added 4 points to his season tally through two penalties. City fielded former Marist player C.M. Stevens in their backs, and made a change on the wing, playing 32 year old utility player George Paki in place of George Davidson which was said to have been a mistake as they lost two try scoring chances on that wing. There were 7,500 spectators present and 212 pounds were raised at the gate with half the money going to charities and the other half to players injured during the season.

22 August	Ponsonby	10–5	City	Carlaw Park 1
3:00	Try: Ivan Littlewood, Leonard Riley; Pen: George Gardiner 2		Try: Ernest Ruby; Pen: Selby Crewther	Attendance: 7,500; Referee: Walter Ripley

=== Stormont Memorial Shield ===
==== Semi final ====
Lou Hutt debuted for Ponsonby after transferring from the Ngaruawahia club in the South Auckland (Waikato) competition. Despite the "squally weather" and muddy ground the match was said to be one of the best games played at Carlaw Park during the season. It featured several New Zealand representatives who had returned from the Australian tour and recently played against the touring Queensland side.

26 September	Ponsonby	23–22	Marist	Carlaw Park 1
3:00	Try: George Gardiner 2, Frank Delgrosso, Len Ward, Bert Payne; Con: Frank Delgrosso 3 Pen: George Gardiner		Try: Charles Gregory, Billy Ghent, Jack Kirwan, Jim O'Brien; Con: Charles Gregory 3 Pen: Charles Gregory 2	Referee: Saunders

==== Final ====
3 October	Ponsonby	35–3	City	Carlaw Park 1
3:00	Try: George Gardiner 4, Tim Peckham 2, H Goodley, Leonard Riley, Bert Payne; Con: Frank Delgrosso, Tim Peckham; Pen: Frank Delgrosso 2		Try: Lou Brown	Referee: Taylor

== Top try scorers and point scorers (senior grade, Roope Rooster and Stormont Memorial Shield) ==
The scoring is from all matches which were technically open to all sides. The Stormont Shield was to become a champion of champions match between the winner of the championship and the winner of the Roope Rooster, however in its first season the winner of the Roope Rooster (Ponsonby) played a semi final match against Marist, who Bill Stormont played with prior to his death.

Top try scorers
Rk	Player	Team	Gms	Tries
1	Lou Brown	City	9	18
2	Ivan Littlewood	Ponsonby	16	16
3	George Gardiner	Ponsonby	13	14
4	James Wardlaw	City	15	13
5	Frank Delgrosso	Ponsonby	10	10
6=	Harry Hawkes	City	11	9
6=	Hec McDonald	City	12	9
6=	H Goodley	Ponsonby	12	9
6=	Leonard Riley	Ponsonby	10	9
10=	Norm Veart	Devonport	13	8
10=	Arthur Singe	Marist	13	8

Top point scorers
Rk	Player	Team	G	T	C	P	M	Pts
1	Frank Delgrosso	Ponsonby	10	10	18	9	0	84
2	George Gardiner	Ponsonby	13	14	12	4	0	74
3	W Hanlon	Richmond	10	7	12	6	0	57
4	Lou Brown	City	9	18	0	0	0	54
5	Ivan Littlewood	Ponsonby	16	16	1	0	0	50
6	Selby Crewther	City	16	7	9	1	0	41
7	Arthur Singe	Marist	13	8	5	3	0	40
8	Charles Gregory	Marist	7	1	14	4	0	39
9	Craddock Dufty	Athletic	6	4	10	3	0	38
10	W Sandham	City	8	1	13	3	-	35

== B Grade standings and results ==
=== B Grade standings ===
Team	Pld	W	D	L	F	A	Pts
Ellerslie United	12	8	2	2	89	62	18
Otahuhu Rovers	11	6	1	4	85	48	13
Kingsland Rovers	10	4	2	4	93	76	10
Māngere United	10	3	1	6	66	96	7
Northcote & Birkenhead Ramblers	11	3	0	8	75	126	6

=== B Grade fixtures ===
In Kingsland's debut in the grade Claude List in his debut season in first grade scored 3 tries in their win over Northcote. He repeated the feat 2 weeks later against Mangere. He would later become the first ever player to represent New Zealand whilst playing for ostensibly a 'second grade' team.

	Date		Score		Score	Venue
Round 1	18 April	Ellerslie	16	Mangere	3	Carlaw Park # 1
–	18 April	Kingsland	21	Northcote	3	Carlaw Park # 2
Round 2	2 May	Ellerslie	6	Kingsland	3	Carlaw Park # 1
–	2 May	Northcote	6	Otahuhu	5	Victoria Park
Round 3	9 May	Ellerslie	7	Otahuhu	14	Ellerslie Reserve
–	9 May	Mangere	13	Kingsland	13	Peter Moko Farm, Westney Road, Mangere
Round 4	16 May	Ellerslie	19	Northcote	11	Auckland Domain
–	16 May	Otahuhu	13	Mangere	0	Otahuhu
Round 5	23 May	Mangere	12	Northcote	11	Victoria Park
–	23 May	Otahuhu	16	Kingsland	3	Otahuhu
Round 6	30 May	Northcote	8	Kingsland	5	Carlaw Park # 1
–	30 May	Ellerslie	12	Mangere	5	Carlaw Park # 2
Round 7	6 June	Otahuhu	2	Northcote	0	Carlaw Park # 1
–	6 June	Ellerslie	9	Kingsland	5	Carlaw Park # 2
Round 8	13 June	Ellerslie	3	Otahuhu	3	Carlaw Park # 1
–	13 June	Kingsland	11	Mangere	2	Carlaw Park # 2
Round 9	20 June	Ellerslie	7	Northcote	5	Ellerslie Reserve
–	20 June	Mangere	10	Otahuhu	14	Mangere
Round 10	4 July	Kingsland	13	Otahuhu	3	Victoria Park, 3 pm
Round 11	11 July	Kingsland	14	Northcote	11	Victoria Park, 3 pm
–	11 July	Mangere	L	Ellerslie	W	Mangere, 3 pm
Round 12	18 July	Ellerslie	5	Kingsland	5	Ellerslie Reserve
–	18 July	Otahuhu	15	Northcote	6	Victoria Park
Round 13	25 July	Otahuhu	L	Ellerslie	W	Otahuhu
–	25 July	Kingsland	CCD	Mangere	CCD	Auckland Domain
Round 14	1 Aug	Northcote	8	Ellerslie	5	Victoria Park
–	1 Aug	Mangere	W	Otahuhu	L	Mangere
Round 15	8 Aug	Mangere	21	Northcote	6	Victoria Park
–	8 Aug	Kingsland	CCD	Otahuhu	CCD	Auckland Domain

The round 15 match between Kingsland and Otahuhu was not played due to the poor condition of the field at the Auckland Domain.

=== Stallard Cup knockout competition ===
This was the first season with a B Division in the First Grade competition and at the end of the season a knockout competition was played between the five teams.

1925 Stallard Cup Results
	Date		Score		Score	Venue
Round 1	15 Aug	Northcote	3	Ellerslie	0	Victoria Park
Semi final	22 Aug	Northcote	19	Mangere	18	Carlaw Park # 2
Semi final	22 Aug	Otahuhu	11	Kingsland	2	Auckland Domain

==== Final ====
The match was played as curtain raiser to the New Zealand game against Queensland.

5 September	Otahuhu	6–2	Northcote	Carlaw Park 1
1:30	Try: Kirkland, + unknown		Pen: Wilkins	Referee: Mr. Ripley

== Lower grades ==
There were 6 lower grade competitions in 1925 below the B Division with the 6th grade split into an A and B division.

=== Second grade ===
Richmond defeated Ponsonby A 15–3 on 5 September of the championship final. Ponsonby B beat Richmond 14–5 in the knockout final on 10 October. Ellerslie and Kingsland withdrew after 4 rounds, United Suburbs after 5 rounds, and City after 7 rounds.

Team	Pld	W	D	L	B	F	A	Pts
Richmond Rovers	12	8	0	1	2	75	21	16
Ponsonby United A	12	7	0	5	3	127	31	14
Ponsonby United B	12	7	0	3	1	43	51	14
Devonport United	12	6	1	5	2	64	32	13
Newton Rangers	8	3	0	5	2	19	100	6
Māngere United	8	2	1	5	2	3	37	5
City Rovers	4	0	2	2	0	11	32	2
United Suburbs	1	0	0	1	1	2	10	0
Ellerslie United	1	0	0	1	0	0	30	0
Kingsland Rovers	0	0	0	0	0	0	0	0

=== Third grade ===
The 1933 Third Grade competition had 17 teams entered which was the largest for any grade in the history of Auckland Rugby League to this point. City Rovers secured the championship when they defeated Ponsonby B on 19 September in round 18. They played Northcote in the knockout final on 3 October but no result was reported. Otahuhu withdrew from the competition after a round 8 default, while Coromandel Old Boys withdrew after round 10.

Team	Pld	W	D	L	B	F	A	Pts
City Rovers	12	11	1	0	1	188	26	23
Athletic	14	9	0	1	0	174	29	18
Point Chevalier	11	8	1	1	1	115	9	17
Northcote & Birkenhead Ramblers	15	8	2	1	0	29	66	18
New Lynn	13	6	2	2	0	41	29	14
Parnell	12	6	0	6	1	57	81	12
Ponsonby United B	12	5	1	4	3	12	47	11
Devonport United	9	4	0	5	1	109	98	8
Richmond Rovers	6	3	1	2	0	29	39	7
United Suburbs A	14	1	1	4	2	9	84	3
Otahuhu Rovers	2	1	0	1	0	10	5	2
Ponsonby United A	6	1	0	5	2	34	83	2
Kingsland Rovers	3	0	2	1	2	2	10	2
Newton Rangers	5	0	1	4	0	11	54	1
United Suburbs B	12	0	0	3	3	5	54	0
Māngere United	5	0	0	5	3	6	95	0
Coromandel Old Boys	8	0	0	3	2	5	27	0

=== Fourth grade ===
Richmond Rovers won the competition undefeated. When they secured the title on 19 September they were a full 6 points clear of their nearest rival according to newspaper reports. Parnell were second and it is likely that they won more matches than the 10 that were reported. City withdrew after 1 round as did New Lynn and Newton B after 2 rounds so they have not been included in the standings, and Marist B after 4 rounds. There were many results that were unreported so the table is incomplete. Richmond beat Athletic in the knockout final on 10 October by 5 points to 3.

Team	Pld	W	D	L	B	F	A	Pts
Richmond Rovers	17	17	0	0	1	102	22	34
Parnell	14	10	0	4	2	262	30	20
Ponsonby United	9	6	0	3	2	178	37	12
Devonport United	7	4	0	3	1	41	72	8
Athletic	7	1	1	5	2	27	61	3
Point Chevalier	7	1	1	5	2	8	113	3
Marist Old Boys A	5	1	0	4	3	16	29	2
Ellerslie United	4	0	1	3	3	13	37	1
Newton Rangers A	7	0	1	6	3	8	133	1
Kingsland Rovers	4	0	0	4	4	6	104	0
Marist Old Boys B	0	0	0	0	0	0	0	0
Māngere United	2	0	0	2	1	0	4	0

=== Fifth grade ===
Richmond won the championship for the second time. The result was not reported in the newspapers but did appear in the Rugby League Annual of 1949 written by Bill Davidson. City won the knockout final 16 to 13 on 10 October over Parnell. Parnell had defeated Northcote & Birkenhead Ramblers 9 to 3 in one semi final, while City defeated Marist in the other by 24 to 5. Athletic withdrew after 12 rounds. Newton entered a team but it is unknown if they played a match as they withdrew after round one.

Team	Pld	W	D	L	B	F	A	Pts
City Rovers	8	6	0	2	2	89	39	12
Richmond Rovers	6	5	0	1	2	80	9	10
Parnell	7	5	0	2	1	52	33	10
Ponsonby United	7	4	0	3	2	25	78	8
Athletic	7	3	0	4	1	63	28	6
Ellerslie United	6	3	0	3	1	46	18	6
Marist Old Boys	6	2	0	4	1	61	40	2
Northcote & Birkenhead Ramblers	4	1	0	3	2	31	48	2
New Lynn	7	0	0	7	2	2	156	0

=== Sixth grade A ===
Richmond won the championship with an undefeated season. They also won the knockout competition when they beat Devonport 8 to 0 in the final on 19 September. Marist withdrew from the competition after 2 rounds. Less than half of the results were reported in the newspapers so the standings are incomplete. The Leys Institute were affiliated to the Ponsonby club. They were usually reported as Leys Institute in the official fixture lists on Thursdays and Fridays in the newspapers but as Ponsonby by the newspapers on Monday when they reported scores. Leys Institute buildings were established by the Leys family in 1905 and the Leys Institute side was for boys in the area interested in keeping themselves physically active.

Team	Pld	W	D	L	B	F	A	Pts
Richmond Rovers	13	13	0	0	0	88	14	26
City Rovers	11	7	0	4	0	180	27	14
Ellerslie United	6	3	1	2	0	54	49	7
Devonport United	7	1	0	6	0	36	69	2
Newton Rangers	6	1	0	5	1	5	69	2
Leys Institute (Ponsonby)	7	0	1	6	0	8	127	1
Marist Old Boys	1	0	0	1	1	0	16	0

=== Sixth grade B ===
Richmond A won the championship. They also won the knockout competition when they beat United Suburbs who had joined the competition late in the season by 32 points to 0. A large number of match results were not reported so the standings are incomplete.

Team	Pld	W	D	L	B	F	A	Pts
City Rovers	8	6	0	2	1	151	24	12
Richmond Rovers A	6	5	0	1	3	167	41	10
Ellerslie United	8	5	0	3	1	75	68	10
Richmond Rovers B	7	2	0	5	1	28	104	4
Athletic	4	1	0	3	1	27	52	2
Point Chevalier	3	1	0	2	2	5	53	2
Northcote & Birkenhead Ramblers	7	1	0	6	1	5	119	2
United Suburbs	1	0	0	1	0	0	32	0

== Exhibition matches ==
=== Exhibition match ===
On 19 April, when Marist had a bye in the first round of the club competition they travelled to Christchurch and played Marist of Christchurch. They won by 16 points to 7. The match also marked the opening of Monica Park. Charles Gregory of the Auckland Marist side scored the first ever points on the ground when he kicked a penalty and thus won a trophy presented by Mrs. Thacker. The match was refereed by former New Zealand player Abbie Shadbolt and featured several current or future New Zealand internationals on both teams.

19 April	Marist (Christchurch)	7–16	Marist (Auckland)	Monica Park, Christchurch
3:00	Try: Lou Petersen; Con: Jack Ellis; Pen: Jack Ellis		Try: Jack Kirwan, Edmund Carroll, Percy Gallagher, Jim O'Brien; Con: Charles Gregory; Pen: Charles Gregory	Referee: Abbie Shadbolt

=== Fund Raising Match (Ponsonby training shed) ===
On Monday, August 11 a fund raising match was held at Carlaw Park to raise money for a training shed for the Ponsonby club. There were 4,000 spectators in attendance with Ponsonby winning 15–5 after winger H Goodley scored two tries to go with one by Joseph Peckham. George Gardiner converted two of the tries and a penalty. For City Hec McDonald scored a try which was converted by former Olympic sprinter George Davidson who was in his 4th and final season with City.

11 August	Ponsonby	15-5	City	Carlaw Park
3:00	Try: Dooley Moore, H Goodley; Con: George Gardiner 2 Pen: George Gardiner		Con: George Davidson	Referee: Bill Mincham

=== Labour Day carnival ===
A crowd of 2,000 was in attendance at the Labour Day carnival match. It was played on the Saturday with the Carnival extending over three days (Friday, Saturday, and Sunday). Unusually it was preceded by a rugby union game between the Vermont Street School who were the season champions, and the St Benedicts XV. Vermont Street won 13 to 3. Ponsonby won the rugby league match by 26 points to 16 and all the victorious players were presented with 'gold' medals afterwards. They had stretched out to a 21–3 halftime lead and extended it further after a "great try" to George Gardiner who beat several opponents. Marist staged a late comeback, scoring three tries but ultimately fell well short.

25 Oct	Ponsonby	26–16	Marist	Carlaw Park 1
3:00	Try: Frank Delgrosso 2, Wilfred McNeil, Tim Peckham, Bert Payne, George Gardiner; Con: Frank Delgrosso 4		Try: Hec Brisbane, Arthur Singe, Jack Kirwan, Bernard Sweeney; Con: Charles Gregory 2	Attendance: 2,000; Referee: Les Bull

== Representative season ==
The Auckland representative team had a busy season. After a series of 3 trial matches on 27 June both the New Zealand team and Auckland teams were selected. Officials had declared that "give us fine weather and we will get an attendance of 20,000". Unfortunately the weather did not oblige and it was in fact described as "the worst experienced this season ... in one place there was a miniature lake." This resulted in a crowd many times smaller, however thousands came into the ground to watch the main match between North Island and South Island, won by the former 27 points to 9. Auckland then played against the New Zealand team and lost 9 points to 16. Following this they played a Northern Union Challenge Cup match against the holders South Auckland and were victorious by 24 points to 16. After the New Zealand team returned from their tour of Australia they again played Auckland at Carlaw Park and they used the experience they had gained to trounce Auckland by 41 points to 17, employing tactics that the Auckland team were not prepared for. Two weeks later Auckland played Queensland who were being touted as the finest league team in the world at the time in the first of three matches. They drew the first, before narrowly losing the second and then being well and truly outclassed in the 3rd match by 54 points to 14.

=== Representative fixtures ===
After the trial matches were played the New Zealand team was selected by Mr Liversedge, Pearce, and Harding, and 14 Auckland players made the side. They were: Craddock Dufty, Charles Gregory, Lou Brown, Hec Brisbane, Frank Delgrosso, Jack Kirwan, Bert Laing, Maurice Wetherill, Wilson Hall, Stan Webb, Bert Avery, Ernie Herring, Jim O'Brien, and Horace Dixon. The following day Sam Lowrie of Ponsonby United was added to the touring side.

==== Inter-Island match ====
27 June	North Island	27–9	South Island	Carlaw Park 1
2:45	Try: Lou Brown, Ben Davidson, Ernie Herring 3, Horace Dixon, Bert Avery; Con: Frank Delgrosso		Try: Neil Mouat; Pen: Neil Mouat 3	Attendance: 4,000; Referee: Arthur Ripley

==== Auckland Trial match ====
27 June	Auckland A	0–5	Auckland B	Carlaw Park 2
1:30			Try: Bert Payne; Con: John Shand	Attendance: 4,000; Referee: Les Bull

==== Auckland C v South Auckland ====
27 June	Auckland C	11–13	South Auckland	Carlaw Park 2
12:30	Try: Cleaver, Wardlaw, McDonald; Con: Clarrie Polson		Try: P Paki, Johnstone; Con: Stan Raynor 2	Attendance: 4,000; Referee: W Murray

==== Auckland v New Zealand ====
2 July	Auckland	9–16	New Zealand	Carlaw Park 1
2:45	Try: George Gardiner, Arthur Singe, Jim O'Brien		Try: Jim Parkes, Stan Webb, Frank Henry 2 Con: Neil Mouat 2	Referee: Les Bull

==== Auckland v South Auckland (Northern Union C.C.) ====
19 August	Auckland	24–16	South Auckland	Carlaw Park 1
3:00	Try: Ivan Littlewood 2, George Gardiner 2, Ben Davidson 2 Con: George Gardiner, Clarrie Polson 2		Try: Finlay, P Paki, Johnston, Jackways; Con: George Raynor; Pen: Finlay	Attendance: 3,000; Referee: Rogers

==== Auckland v New Zealand ====
29 August	Auckland	17–41	New Zealand	Carlaw Park 1
3:00	Try: Ben Davidson, Leonard Riley, Neville St George; Con: Arthur Singe 3 Pen: Arthur Singe		Try: Maurice Wetherill 3, Jim O'Brien, Horace Dixon, Bert Avery 3, Jim Sanders; Con: Frank Delgrosso 7	Attendance: 15,000; Referee: Walter Ripley

==== Auckland B v West Coast ====
9 September	West Coast	15–22	Auckland B	Victoria Park, Greymouth, West Coast
	Try: Quinn 2 (including penalty try), O’Brien; Con: Neil Mouat 2 Pen: Neil Mouat		Try: Matthew Kirkland, Tim Peckham, Hector Cole 2, Claude List, Alf Townsend; Con: Hector Cole 2	Attendance: 2000; Referee: C Dewar

==== Auckland v Queensland ====
In the match reports the newspapers did not distinguish between the two Jim O'Brien's. It is more likely that the try scored was by Jim O'Brien purely because he was playing in the second row (despite often playing at prop) and was more involved in the loose play which the try itself came from. The try came after a kick was chased by Maurice Wetherill.

9 September	Auckland	18–18	Queensland	Carlaw Park 1
	Try: Stan Webb, Bert Avery 2, Jim O'Brien; Con: Frank Delgrosso 2 Pen: Frank Delgrosso		Try: Eric Fraunfelder, Cecil Aynsley, Jeff Moores, Herb Steinohrt; Con: Jim Craig 3	Attendance: 6,000; Referee: W Ripley

==== Auckland B v Canterbury ====
12 September	Canterbury	6–5	Auckland B	Monica Park, Christchurch
3:00	Try: S Polaschek, Frank Henry		Try: Bill Te Whata; Pen: Len Mason	Attendance: 2,500; Referee: W Healey

==== Auckland B v Wellington ====
16 September	Wellington	9–68	Auckland B	Newtown Park, Wellington
3:00	Try: Shanahan; Con: Balk 1 Pen: Balk 2		Try: Ben Davidson 3, Claude List, Roy Hardgrave, Selby Crewther, Bill Te Whata 5, Hec McDonald 2, Nelson Bass 3 Con: Roy Hardgrave, Hector Cole, Hec McDonald, Nelson Bass 6 Pen: Len Mason	Referee: Parkinson

==== Auckland v South Auckland (Northern Union C.C.) ====
Claude List became the first player selected from the B Division to make the full Auckland representative side. He played for the Kingsland Rovers club and had been mentioned as being as good as any player in his position in New Zealand rugby league. He was to go on to represent New Zealand from 1928 to 1932 and play senior club football into the 1940s.

19 September	Auckland	36–19	South Auckland	Carlaw Park 1
2:45	Try: Matthew Kirkland 2, Claude List 2, Ben Davidson, Neville St George, Jim O'Brien, Arthur Singe; Con: Frank Delgrosso 5 Pen: Frank Delgrosso		Try: Finlay, John Dufty, Huatahi Paki; Con: F Raynor, John Dufty; Pen: F Raynor 3	Referee: Bill Mincham

==== Auckland Province v Queensland ====
Shortly before halftime Stan Rayner was carried from the field on a stretcher and replaced by Bill Te Whata.

10 October	Auckland Province	14–54	Queensland	Carlaw Park 1
3:00	Try: Arthur Singe, Bert Avery (obstruction try); Con: Frank Delgrosso; Pen: Frank Delgrosso 3		Try: Arthur Henderson, Bill Spencer 4, Tom Gorman, Cecil Aynsley 3, James Purcell; Con: Jim Craig 9	Attendance: 9,000; Referee: Les Bull

=== Auckland representative matches played and scorers ===
This list only includes the Auckland team games and does not include the Auckland B, Auckland C, and Auckland Province matches.

No	Name	Club Team	Play	Tries	Con	Pen	Points
1	Frank Delgrosso	Ponsonby	2	0	7	2	18
2	Arthur Singe	Marist	5	2	3	1	14
3	Ben Davidson	City	3	4	0	0	12
4	George Gardiner	Ponsonby	3	3	1	0	11
5	Jim O'Brien	Devonport	5	3	0	0	9
6	Claude List	Kingsland	1	2	0	0	6
6	Bert Avery	Athletic	1	2	0	0	6
6	Ivan Littlewood	Ponsonby	4	2	0	0	6
6	Matthew Kirkland	Marist	1	2	0	0	6
6	Neville St George	Devonport	4	2	0	0	6
11	Clarrie Polson	Newton	1	0	2	0	4
12	Leonard Riley	Ponsonby	2	1	0	0	3
12	Stan Webb	Devonport	1	1	0	0	3
14	Hector Cole	Ponsonby	4	0	0	0	0
14	Hec McDonald	City	3	0	0	0	0
14	M Herewini	Ponsonby	3	0	0	0	0
14	Charles Gregory	Marist	2	0	0	0	0
14	Bert Payne	Ponsonby	2	0	0	0	0
14	Tim Peckham	Ponsonby	2	0	0	0	0
14	Bill Te Whata	Athletic	1	0	0	0	0
14	Ernie Herring	Athletic	1	0	0	0	0
14	R Greening	Northcote	1	0	0	0	0
14	Roy Hardgrave	Newton	1	0	0	0	0
14	Harry Douglas	Devonport	1	0	0	0	0
14	Horace Dixon	Devonport	1	0	0	0	0
14	Jack Kirwan	Marist	1	0	0	0	0
14	Jim O'Brien	Marist	2	0	0	0	0
14	Len Mason	Athletic	1	0	0	0	0
14	James Molloy	Athletic	1	0	0	0	0
14	Lou Brown	City	1	0	0	0	0
14	Ernie Mackie	City	1	0	0	0	0
14	Maurice Wetherill	City	1	0	0	0	0
14	Nelson Bass	City	1	0	0	0	0
14	Selby Crewther	City	1	0	0	0	0
14	Alf Townsend	City	1	0	0	0	0
