= New Lynn League Football Club =

Defunct NZ rugby league club, based in Auckland

Club information
- Full name: New Lynn League Football Club
- Short name: New Lynn
- Colours: Blue and White (1924-32), Royal Blue (1933)
- Founded: 1924
- Exited: 1933

Former details
- Competition: Auckland Rugby League

The New Lynn League Football Club was a rugby league club in Auckland, New Zealand which existed for 10 years from 1924 to 1933. They competed in the Auckland Rugby League lower grade competitions. The club was made up of players from New Lynn and the surrounding area in West Auckland. At the time of their existence the area was predominantly rural, while today due to urban sprawl it has become a populated suburb of Auckland.

== History ==
=== 1924 Formation ===
The New Lynn club was formed in early March, 1933. A meeting was held with Mr. P. Neville presiding. Along with local residents Mr. W.J. Hammill, chairman of the Auckland Rugby League, and Mr. A. Powell, a member of the New Zealand League Council attended. The following officers were elected; Patron, Hon. C.J. Parr; vice patron, Mr. A. Crum, senr.; president, Mr. C.F. Gardiner; secretary and delegate to the league, Mr. C. Crum; treasurer, Mr. Mathieson; auditor, Mr. Ivan Culpan; management committee, Messrs. T. Brown and R. Brown, in addition to the chairman, secretary and treasurer. At the same meeting they decided to enter three teams in the junior grades. Ultimately they just entered two teams in the third grade and fifth grade competitions.

==== 1924 Teams ====
The third grade team only had six results reported which were three wins and three losses. It is likely they finished mid table in the 14 team competition for the Hayward Cup. They scored 59 points and conceded 61 in those six games. Their first ever game was against Marist Old Boys on April 26 at New Lynn at 3pm with Mr. Burgess referee. Perhaps disappointingly they won the game by default. Marist at this stage in their history was based in the city rather than their present day location in Mount Albert. Two weeks later they played Māngere United at New Lynn on May 10 with T. Avery refereeing. New Lynn won the game 23-0 though no individual scoring was reported. On May 14 it was reported that a T. Vercoe had transferred to the club from the Athletic club in Hamilton. They lost on May 24 to Athletic 22-5. Results against United Suburbs and Point Chevalier were not reported before a 16-7 loss to Richmond Rovers and another loss to Devonport United 23-5. They had no results reported in games against Māngere United and Athletic before a 19-0 win over United Suburbs on August 9.

They then had three more unreported results before a 20-10 win over Ponsonby United in a knockout game in September 13. They were knocked out of the competition when they lost to Athletic 10-2.

Their fifth grade side played their first game against Northcote and Birkenhead Ramblers on April 26 at Victoria Park at 2pm with Mr. Bell refereeing. The result was not reported but they played the same opponent the following week indicating that the initial match was not played. The match was drawn 3-3. Of their next twelve games only five results were reported. The last of which was a 48-8 loss to Ponsonby at New Lynn. They then beat Point Chevalier 8-6 on September 13. A week later they beat Northcote 12-2 with Spencer and Mills scoring tries with Smith converting one and also kicking two penalties.

=== 1925, 3rd and 5th Grades ===
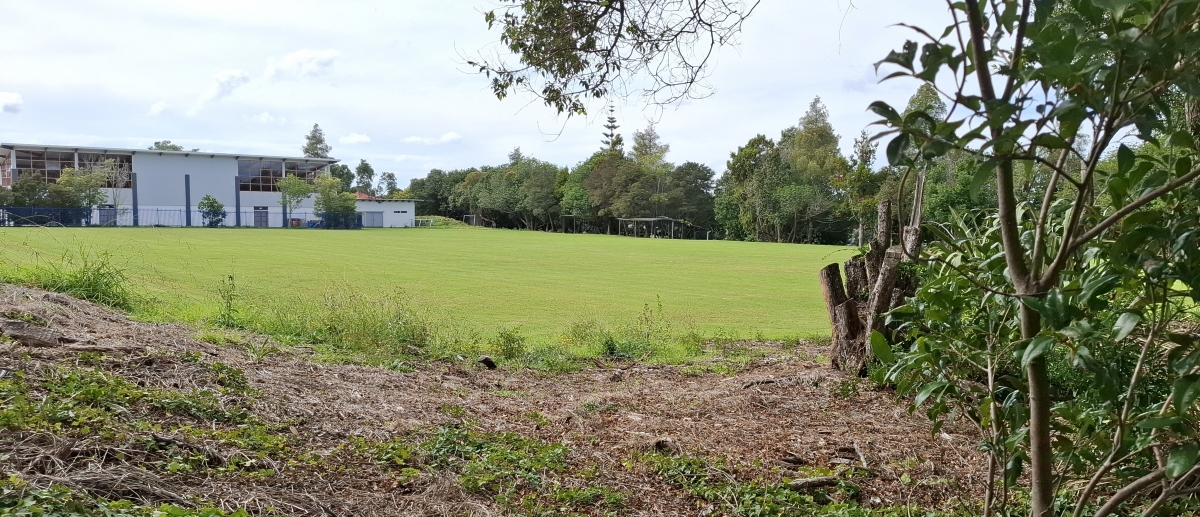
The corner of Lynnwood Road and Great North Road, the location of where the club acquired land for a field. It is now part of the Kelston Girls College playing fields.

The 1925 season saw New Lynn field sides in the 3rd and 5th grades once more. On March 24 the “New Lynn Rugby League Football Club” “intimated to the New Lynn Town Board… that they had purchased an area of 4.5 acres for the purposes of a sports ground for the district, the land being situated on the Great North Road and in the vicinity of Lynwood Road. This is most likely the location of the present day sports fields at Kelston Girls College which are on the corner of those two roads. They said it was their “intention to ask the New Lynn public to give moral and financial support to the project, and on the title being lifted it was intended to hand over the ground to the Town Board with the one reservation that the league club have the use of the same on Saturday afternoons”. The chairman of the Town Board, Mr. C.F. Gardner, was asked to become one of the trustees and he said that he was prepared to discuss the position with the club officials if the board wished. On July 8 at the Auckland Rugby League weekly meeting the New Lynn club sent a deputation led by Mr. H. Brown which “asked for assistance in the upkeep of a ground purchased by the club at New Lynn”. The board said “the action of the club in purchasing a ground of its own was approved, and every possible assistance promised”. Then at the end of the season on October 7 at the Auckland Rugby League meeting the club wrote “asking for assistance in the purchase of a sports ground already acquired in the New Lynn district” with it “decided to make a grant towards the fund”.

Their 3rd grade side had eight results reported in the newspapers with 4 wins, 2 losses, and 2 draws and most likely finished about 5th of the 17 teams in the competition. The New Lynn 5th grade team struggled through the year losing very heavily in most games without scoring. Their only reported points were in a 25-2 loss to City Rovers.

=== 1926, 3rd open and 4th grade ===
The 1926 season saw New Lynn field two teams, one on the 3rd open grade and another in the 4th grade. A nearby Glen Eden rugby league club had also entered the competition with teams in two grades. On Monday, March 22 the New Lynn Town Board met and the New Lynn Rugby League Football Club “asked that its grounds should be rated on the same footing as other reserves as its funds were depleted. Their 3rd grade side only had 2 results reported from their 14 scheduled fixtures, a 26-2 loss to Grafton Athletic (formerly Maritime), and a 19-3 win over Devonport United (North Shore Albions). Then on October 3 they played a friendly match with a South Auckland (Waikato) team which they lost 3-0. The 4th grade team had a match scheduled with Otahuhu Rovers and another with Grafton Athletic but neither had results reported and they then withdrew from the competition.

=== 1927, 3rd open team ===
In 1927 New Lynn only fielded one team which was in the 3rd open grade. Their annual meeting was held at the Billiard Saloon in New Lynn on Wednesday, March 28 at 7:30pm. Their secretary was C. Crun. On May 11 at the Auckland Rugby League management meeting a sum of £8 was granted to New Lynn club for ground rent. The New Lynn side won the grade which was their first ever grade win, lifting the Walker Shield. There were almost no results reported during the season so the actual detailed standings are unknown. They defeated Athletic on June 11 by 5 points to 0, and then beat Devonport 15-6 on July 23. Then they won the championship a week later on July 30 when they drew with Athletic 3-3. They had a one point lead over them in the championship and as this was the final round it meant they held on to win the competition. For New Lynn Gibson scored their try in the draw which was described as “brilliant” in the Auckland Star. The club celebrated the championship win with a smoke concert at Foresters' Hall in late August.

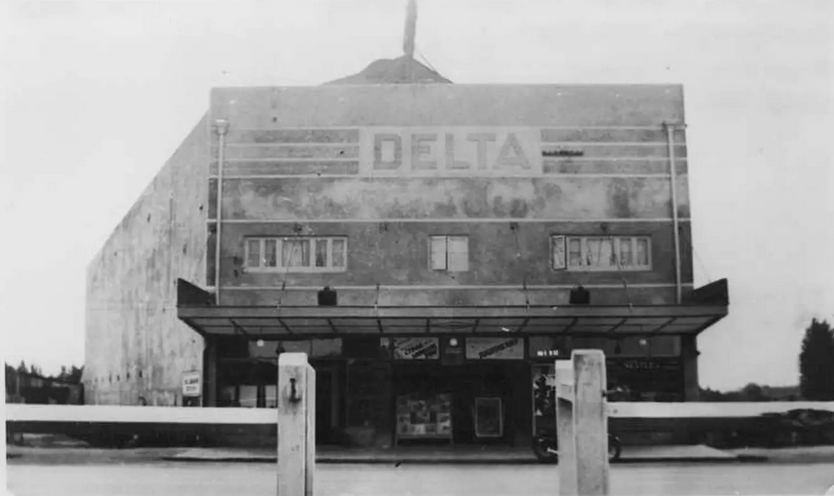
The Delta Theatre, New Lynn in 1932.

In October the club held a large ball at the Delta Theatre with 120 couples in attendance and the venue decorated in the club colours of blue and white. Music was provided by Al Clark’s orchestra. A competition was held for the “most original and prettiest” costumes was held with Oakley Browne the head judge. Miss Gladys Edwards and Miss Peggy Harris won the ‘prettiest’ costumes award. It was mentioned that the power board switched off the lights near midnight which was “unfortunate”. The committee which organised the evening was Mesdames Postelwaight, Bennett, Worms, Campbell and Miss Power. Mr. E Bell was the club secretary for the dance. During the evening Mr. George Firth was presented with an award for the most consistent player in the third grade team. At the very end of the season they held a final event which was a Euchre (cards) and Dance at the Delta Theatre in New Lynn on November 10 at 8pm.

=== 1928 3rd Open and Intermediate ===
The 1928 season for New Lynn started with their annual meeting at the Foresters’ Hall in New Lynn on Wednesday, March 28. They fielded teams in the 3rd Open grade and the 3rd Intermediate grade. The Open side finished in the top third of a 14 team competition. They had more results reported than the previous season with six wins and four losses. Most of their wins came in the first half of the season and they began losing regularly after that, finishing with four straight losses including a 22-0 loss to Ponsonby in round one of the knockout competition. In July they lost the services of Firth who transferred to Richmond Rovers to become their hooker. Firth was most likely their player of the year from the previous season. Their 3rd Intermediate team had two reported wins, a draw, and nine reported losses meaning they likely finished 8th out of nine. They beat Point Chevalier 6-2 in the first round of the knockout competition before losing to Richmond in the second round.

=== 1929 New Lynn and Glen Eden Amalgamation (Glen Lynn) ===
The 1929 season saw the New Lynn and Glen Eden Rovers clubs amalgamate to form a club named Glen Lynn. They entered teams in the 3rd Open Grade, the 3rd Intermediate Grade, and the 6th B Grade. Games in the area around this time were played at Mrs Arnold’s paddock, which was Waikaukau Road in Glen Eden, along with a property next to the present day Kelston Shopping Centre. The latter may well have been the ground which the club had organised a few seasons earlier, as it was nearby.

In July the Sun newspaper wrote that "the amalgamation of the Glen Lynn and New Lynn teams has been a great success and the now named Glen Lynn side has been rather unlucky in not standing on a higher rung of the competition ladder." They went on to say that Frank Newton was a "sound fullback, while winger Montgomery packs plenty of speed and certainly knows what to do when he gets the ball. Ned Kelly is a consistent player and Firth at half has now found his right position. The Arnold brothers are good and one of them, Dave, was perhaps unlucky in not being chosen for the reps. Jack Doolan as breakaway showed an improvement in form and it looks as though he has also found his right position."

Their 3rd Open side finished near the top of the grade with 9 wins and 4 losses while the 3rd Intermediate side struggled with 2 wins and 10 losses. The 6th B grade team also only won 3 games with 4 draws and 9 losses. On July 27 the 6th grade side played Northcote at Carlaw Park and the Sun newspaper wrote a short piece on the game. They said that “Nicklin on the wing showed that he has plenty of speed, and although not doing so well in the first half came to light well during the second and made some fine runs. Pearson on the other wind is also very speedy, but as yet cannot be called a heady player. Barlow at centre is favoured with the art of cutting in which he does to perfection… Lewis is sound on both the defence and attack, but the palm must got to halfback Vaughan, who is very clever and elusive. The forwards played well, especially in the second spell, those standing out for special mention being Tannihill, Milne and Brady.

A key match was played between Glen Lynn and Richmond 3rd Open sides on August 17 at Carlaw Park. The match was a curtain-raiser to the Northern Union Cup match between Auckland and Northland. The match was said to be the final for the championship. Although it was essentially second (Richmond) v third (Glen Lynn) with Ponsonby one point ahead of Richmond but with no games remaining. The Richmond side included players such as George Davis, Charles Dunn, Thompson, Stehr, and Roy Powell who would all play senior league for Richmond in the following years with Powell representing New Zealand in 1935 and 1936. Glen Lynn lost 2 points to 0 giving Richmond the competition points they needed to finish first. The Sun wrote “one of the hardest and most strenuous football battles ever fought out on Carlaw Park took place last Saturday when the Richmond third graders defeated Glen Lynn in the final of the championship competition by two points to nil… the game was a dour struggle from whistle to whistle, neither side crossing the line… For Glen Lynn, Dolan was the outstanding forward, and enjoyed a deal of the limelight, while Arnold, Wickham, Rogers, Glover and Everet all worked hard and went right through with their dogged play without letting up. Among the backs, Kelly at five eighths proved himself a star and was to a large extent responsible for breaking up many of the Richmond back movements. White on the wing managed some fine dashes down the line, and would certainly have been responsible for one try had he been favoured with stronger support”. J Hemmingway of their side was selected in the Auckland Junior representative side as was Arnold. On August 30 the Glen Lynn third grade side played the Newton 2nd grade side and showed how good they were by drawing 6-6. For Glen Lynn Hemmingson “made a good showing, but unfortunately had to leave the field with an injured ankle. Montgomery and White, the two wingers, worried the opposition a great deal with their strong running, the former especially made some great openings…. Halfback Firth is sound, but plays the bling a little too much. Among the Glen Lynn forwards, Glover, W. Arnold and Dolan shone out as fast following up forwards, while Everatt was always very solid”.

The 3rd Intermediate side finished 7th of eight teams with two wins and ten losses with one of their wins a default win over the Northcote & Birkenhead Ramblers. While the 6th grade B team fared no better winning three games, drawing four and losing nine to finish 8th of nine.

=== 1930 Glen Lynn (3rd Open, 4th, 6th, and 7th Grades) ===
The 3rd Open side finished 3rd with a 7 win, 1 draw, 6 loss record. On May 17 they played Kingsland Athletic who finished second, drawing 5-5.

The same weekend the Glen Lynn 4th grade side (which ultimately finished last) was defeated by City. The Sun wrote that “Power gave a fine display, other players who did well being A. White, Millens and Baldwin. Malham of the forwards is also a good player, but he should let the captain do all the talking”. The following weekend the club sent their full team lineup to the Auckland Star to be published on the Friday before the game and it was as follows: “E. Power, L. Crutcher, J. Baldwin, H. Brady, A. White, G. Malam, W. Millens, G. Newton, J. Morman, J. Barlow, P. Wickham, R. Nickelon, B. Bailey, D. Bennett, H. Larson, and R. Shaw”.

The 6th grade side was said to be “finding its feet, and in another week or so will have a great little team in the field. On Saturday the outstanding players were Boyd, Bath and J Bremnan”. The comments in the Sun may have been optimistic as they finished last losing all of their games. The 7th grade side had a similar record and finished last also.

On June 12 the Auckland Star wrote that the club had asked for financial assistance from the Auckland Rugby League at their weekly meeting. A decision on the matter was “deferred for further consideration”. In early September the club wrote to thank the league “for recent financial assistance” indicating that they had contributed money towards the club.

On July 18 the Sun newspaper wrote several paragraphs on the Glen Lynn sides matches the previous weekend (July 12). It was said that their 3rd grade team “after a battle royal, were beaten 8-5… It was a grand game, the teams being very evenly matched. Sainsbury was the mainstay of Glen Lynn, being unlucky not to have scored on several occasions. Everett played a good game, as did Montgomery, but “Monty” has one bad fault – he will not pass the ball when he is about to be or is tackled”. While the 4th grade side had played Richmond and was “a bit off colour. Ted Power at half, played an outstanding game. The fullback, Wickam was equally as good, while in the forwards Dyer and Milnes were A1. The forwards would do better if they were waiting for it to come back to them. Mormon, the winger, wants to pass the ball infield when he is blocked”. The same article wrote that the 7th grade team “is improving and the boys are playing great football. Last Saturday, against Avondale, they got the ball nearly every time from the scrum, and the combination of the backs was pretty to watch. The forwards are sound, Bath, the five-eighth, is a good boy, but the second five-eighths wants to try and run straight upfield instead of across. Bartrum on the wing, is going to go a long way in the game.

=== 1931 Glen Lynn (3rd Open, 3rd Intermediate), 5th, and 7th Grades) ===
Glen Lynn fielded four teams once again for the 1931 season. The Glenora club formed in 1931 and fielded a single side in the 3rd grade intermediate grade. They were named Glenora because they were based in the Glen Eden area but some of their players came from Oratia hence the combined name of ‘Glen’ ‘Ora’. Echoing previous years when the Glen Lynn club was ‘New Lynn’ they requested help from the New Lynn Borough Council in acquiring a playing area. The letter the Council received said that “a majority of the members were New Lynn boys”. They decided to “supply the club with details relative to an area existing for league football on the Great North Road, New Lynn”. The 3rd Intermediate, 5th, and 7th grade teams all finished well down the standings in their respective grades.

=== Disappearance of Glen Lynn ===
The 1932 season saw Glen Lynn cease to exist. Despite having four teams the season prior they failed to field any teams. Glenora only fielded one team which was in the third open grade so the former Glen Lynn players did not move to any neighbouring suburban sides.

=== New Lynn return (1933-34) ===
The 1933 season saw a New Lynn club reappear by itself with a 3rd grade and 5th grade side. The 3rd grade team struggled, with just one recorded win and six losses, while the 5th grade team had no recorded wins and seven losses. On May 2 the Auckland Rugby League gave permission for the New Lynn club to "adopt royal blue as the colour of their jerseys for the coming season". On May 13 New Lynn and Glenora played each other in the 3rd Open Grade at Glen Eden. Glenora won the match 8 points to 3 however New Lynn protested owing to the colour of the jerseys which Glenora wore. The junior management committee of the Auckland Rugby League met on the following Tuesday and "decided that Glenora were in the wrong, and the match would be replayed later, if having any bearing on the grade championship".

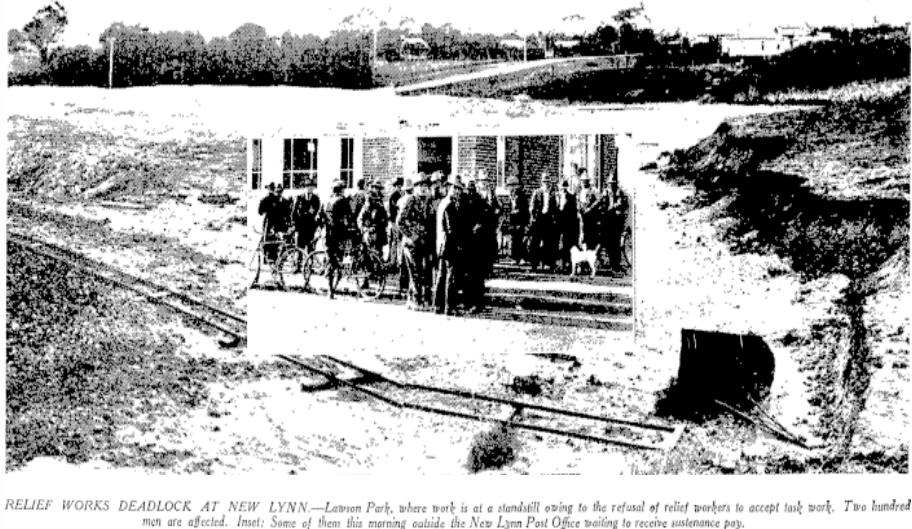
Lawson Park progress in June of 1934.

The same year, in late March work began on Lawson Park with “cutting and filling work, and progress would now be more apparent”. The work was largely being done by labour being given out during the depression years. In late January of 1934 the progress of the work at Lawson Park was reported on at the New Lynn Borough Council meeting with Mr. E.V. Blake, the town planning consultant stating “that the work carried out had been somewhat slow, but what had been done had been kept well to line and level. The heaviest sections had been completed and as soon as the next cross-section was done much greater progress would be noticed. He recommended that all work be restricted to the excavation of the main area. In the meantime a programme of planting for the next season should be considered. The report was referred to the works committee”.

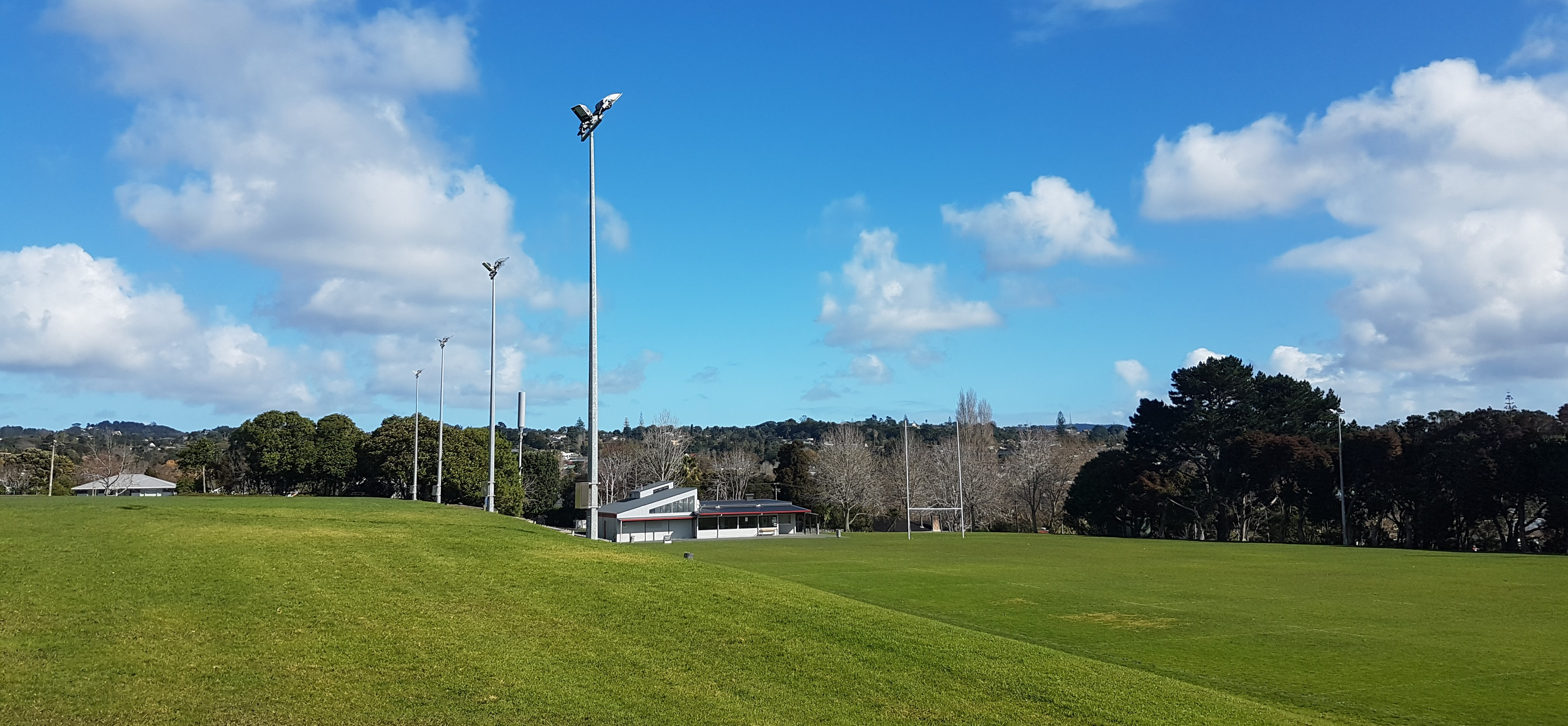
Lawson Park in New Lynn in 2021 with the lower field being the home ground of New Lynn rugby league. The current New Lynn Stags rugby league club rooms are in the background.

The ground was eventually completed in 1938 after the land had originally been acquired by the council in 1925 but it was grazed until work began in the 30s. It was intended once the ground was completed to have two tennis courts and two netball courts on the upper area with a rugby or rugby league ground on the lower part. Ultimately the lower part became the home field for the New Lynn Rugby League Club which formed in 1967, while the top half became a training area.

In 1934 they began the year with a special meeting on March 22 at the Old Post Office on Totara Avenue in New Lynn requesting all “players, intending players and supporters” to please attend. However the club was unable to field any sides and it they ceased to exist beyond this point. The Glenora club increased its numbers to three sides this season and would grow to become the dominant side in the area ultimately winning 1st grade championships in 1962, 1997, 1998, 1999, and 2017. The club being based in Glen Eden at Harold Moody Park. With the New Lynn club forming in 1967 and continuing until the present day.

=== Team Records ===
==== Most Senior Team ====
The season record for the most senior team in the club.

Year	Grade	Club Name	Pld	W	D	L	PF	PA	PD	Pts	Position (Teams)
1924	3rd Grade (Hayward Shield)	New Lynn	6	3	0	3	59	61	-2	6	6th of 14
1925	3rd Grade	New Lynn	13	6	2	2	41	29	+12	14	5th of 17
1926	3rd Grade	New Lynn	14	1	0	1	21	29	-8	2	5th of 9
1927	3rd Grade	New Lynn	12	2	1	0	23	9	+14	5	1st of 7 (most results not reported)
1928	3rd Grade (Walker Shield)	New Lynn	13	6	0	4	67	41	+26	12	5th of 14
1929	3rd Grade Open (Hayward Shield)	Glen Lynn	13	9	0	4	84	35	+49	18	3rd of 8
1930	3rd Grade	Glen Lynn	14	7	1	6	118	146	-28	15	3rd of 8
1931	3rd Grade	Glen Lynn	9	0	0	5	2	97	-95	0	5th of 6 (most results not reported)
1932		No teams fielded									
1933	3rd Grade Open (Hayward Shield)	New Lynn	13	1	0	6	26	137	-111	2	7th of 8
1924-33	TOTAL	-	107	35	4	31	441	584	-143	74	
