= Glen Eden Rovers =

Defunct NZ rugby league club, based in Auckland

Club information
- Full name: Glen Eden Rovers Rugby League Football Club
- Short name: Glen Eden
- Founded: 1926
- Exited: 1931

Former details
- Ground: Glen Eden
- Competition: Auckland Rugby League

The Glen Eden Rovers Rugby League Football Club was a rugby league club in Auckland, New Zealand, which existed for 6 years from 1926 to 1931. They competed in the Auckland Rugby League lower grade competitions. The club was made up of players from Glen Eden and the surrounding area in West Auckland. At the time of their existence the area was predominantly rural, while today due to urban sprawl it has become a populated suburb of Auckland. In 1929 they merged with the New Lynn club to form Glen Lynn for 3 seasons before the formation of a Glenora club in 1931. Players in the area started to play for the Glenora club while the New Lynn based players went back to their own club for a few seasons before folding.

== History ==
=== 1926 Formation (3rd Open and 3rd Intermediate) ===
The club formed in early 1926 and fielded two teams in the 3rd Open and 3rd Intermediate Grades respectively. Their first ever game was played by the 3rd Open team against Northcote & Birkenhead Ramblers (Northcote Tigers) on April 30 at Glen Eden at 3pm. The referee was A. Coulam. The Glen Eden ground was most likely Mrs Arnold’s paddock near Waikaukau Road in Glen Eden as it was used for rugby league games around this time. The score is unknown as the newspapers did not receive a result to publish. The following weekend they played the local New Lynn club which they would later merge with. The team list was published with the team name being reported as the “Glen Eden Rovers” for the first time. The side was A. Ross, G. Bartram, B. Arnold, E. Hayter, D. Arnold, G. Fish, R. Montgomery, W. Leadbeater, J. Arnold, P. Wood, E. Hemming, W. Bagnall, and H. Bagnall, with N. Sheppard, and F. Dorne named as the reserves. Once again the score was not reported. Their next game against United Suburbs at Glen Eden on May 15 and saw them lose 11-0. They lost again to Grafton Athletic 47-2 in their next game on May 29 at Grey Lynn Park.

On June 5 their 3rd Grade Intermediate team joined the competition and played their debut match against Newton Rangers at Glen Eden at 3pm, with it refereed by Mr. Smith. Like the majority of games played in Glen Eden there was no score reported. The teams played Māngere United and Kingsland Rovers on June 12 respectively before the Open grade side had a bye on June 19, and the Intermediate side playing Devonport United (North Shore). They lost 23-0. On July 17 the Intermediate team to play Parnell was published in the Auckland Star and included Montgomery (2), J. Arnold, L. Robertson, W. Leadbeater, F. Dorne, E. Hayter, N. Sheppard, F. Jones, H. Hemming, E. Fox, and A. Parker. Many of these players had begun the season in the 3rd Open side which was also named for this weekends game against Devonport included A. Ross, P. Wood, L. Wood, Arnold (3), Bagnall (2), G. Bartrum, L. Rosier, J. Kilgour, G. Fish, E. Hemming, with H. Bagnall the reserve. Both sides continued the season though there were very few results reported in the grade. On August 28 the Open Grade team lost 10-0 to United Suburbs, and the Intermediate team lost to Devonport 21-4 in what was to be their final game of the season. Following the season in early December the club sent a deputation representing themselves and the soccer club “re use of the grounds for the 1927 season. The matter was left in the hands of the Recreation Ground Committee to submit a scheme and charges”. The debut season of the club saw neither team reportedly winning a match.

=== 1927 3rd Open Team ===
The 1927 season saw the Glen Eden club only field one team. Once again they struggled and from 11 games they only had 2 results reported which were both losses. Their opening round match was against Grafton Athletic (Maritime) on May 7 at Glen Eden at 3pm, with Mr. L. Henning refereeing. Their team was Arnolds (2), R. Montgomery, Delaney, De Lorrie, W. Bagnall, G. Bartrum, C. Hare, McDonald, Leadbeater, Hemming (2), P. Wood, N. Shepherd, Ryan, Bennett, Jowitt, and Johnson. They lost the match 11 to 3. There were no results reported for their matches with Northcote and Birkenhead Ramblers (May 14), Māngere United (May 21), New Lynn (4 June), Devonport United (11 June), Ponsonby United (18 June), Devonport (25 June), Grafton Athletic (2 July), Māngere (9 July), New Lynn (16 July), before a 6-3 loss to Ponsonby on July 23.

On August 13 they beat Māngere in a knockout game at New Lynn and progressed to the following week against Ponsonby. The score wasn’t reported but as they continued in the competition and Māngere did not it is obvious that they won. Two weeks later on August 27 their season came to an end when they lost 3-2 to Athletic at the Auckland Domain. The Auckland Junior representative side was selected to travel to Rotorua to play on September 3 with Hemming being chosen in the forwards.

=== 1928 (3rd Grade Open) ===
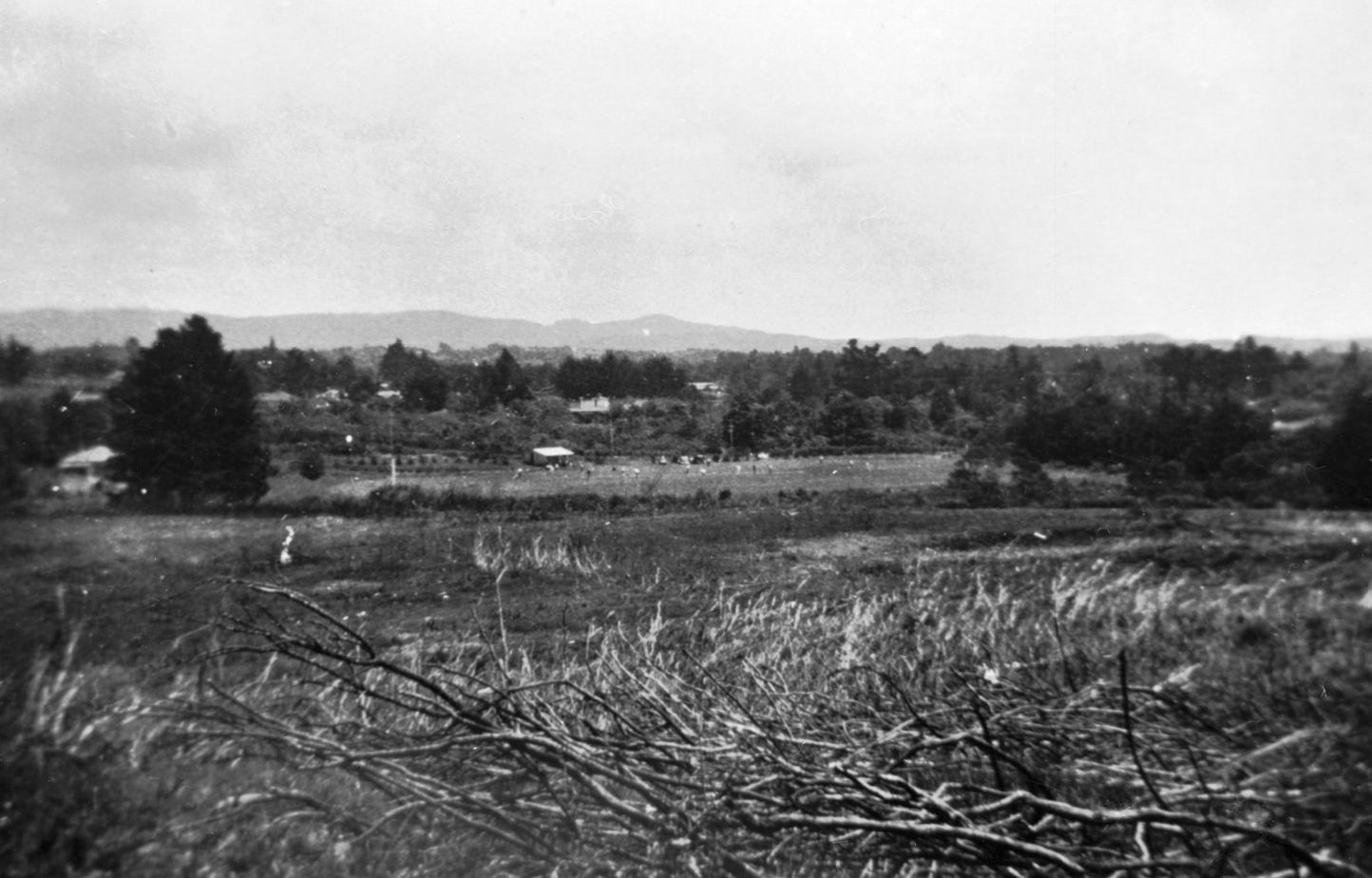
The Glen Eden Recreation Reserve in 1933. The likely area the club was purchasing in the late 1920s. The area shown is the present day Duck Park photographed from Evans Road to the east.

Glen Eden once again fielded just the one team in 1928, which was again in the 3rd Grade Open competition for the Walker Shield. At the Auckland Rugby League meeting on April 26 the Glen Eden club was given some financial assistance by the league for “the purchase of its sports ground in the district”.

Their opening game was against Richmond Rovers on May 5 at Glen Eden. Their team for the game was G. Bartrum, L. Robertson, J. Kruzanich, R. Montgomery, G. Hemming, L. Carpenter, W. Montgomery, L. Rogers, A. Parker, D. Arnold, W. Bagnall, W. Leadbeater, W. Arnold, A. Ryan, T. Bradley, C. Everitt, and N. Shepherd. They lost the match 3-0 though were more competitive this season, as Richmond went on to win the competition which featured 14 teams. They lost again to Otahuhu Rovers on May 19 by 4 points to 3. And then again, 6-3 to Ponsonby on May 26. Another loss followed at Glen Eden when Mount Albert United beat them 14-0. The scores were not reported in games against Athletic on June 9, and Devonport B on June 16. They suffered yet another loss on June 23 when they were beaten by their local rivals, New Lynn by 6 points to 0. They played Ponsonby on June 30, Ellerslie United on July 7, and Northcote on July 14 with none of the scores reported.

Finally on July 21 Glen Eden had their first confirmed win when they played Devonport A at the Devonport Domain at 3pm with Mr. J. Hill refereeing. They won by 11 points to 5. The following week on July 28 they played Kingsland Rovers at Carlaw Park on the number 2 field. The match was one of the curtain-raisers for the North Island v South Island. The result for the game was not reported. They had another win against Northcote on August 18 at Northcote (Stafford Park). Their team list was published for the first time in months and included W. Bagnall, W. Arnold, D. Arnold, R. Montgomery, R. Simpson, W. Leadbeater, L. Shepherd, E. Hayter, F. Newton, B. McDonald, L. Robertson, G. Hemming, L. Rogers, C. Everitt, R. Griffiths, and J. Krzanich. Glen Eden won 12-8. A week later on August 25 they had another win, 8-0 over New Lynn at Glen Eden with Mr. C. Holmes refereeing. They had unknown scores against Athletic on September 1 and Kingsland on September 8, before an 8-0 loss to Mount Albert. On September 29 they suffered a heavy 34-4 defeat to Richmond at Western Springs with Stuart Billman refereeing. Their final game of the season and ultimately their final game as a stand alone club came against Ellerslie on October 13 at the Ellerslie Reserve. The score for the match was not reported.

=== 1929 Glen Eden and New Lynn Amalgamation (Glen Lynn) ===
The 1929 season saw the Glen Eden and New Lynn clubs amalgamate to form a club named Glen Lynn. They entered teams in the 3rd Open Grade, the 3rd Intermediate Grade, and the 6th B Grade. Games in the area around this time were played at Mrs Arnold’s paddock, which was Waikaukau Road in Glen Eden, along with a property next to the present day Kelston Shopping Centre.

In July the Sun newspaper wrote that "the amalgamation of the Glen Lynn and New Lynn teams has been a great success and the now named Glen Lynn side has been rather unlucky in not standing on a higher rung of the competition ladder." They went on to say that Frank Newton was a "sound fullback, while winger Montgomery packs plenty of speed and certainly knows what to do when he gets the ball. Ned Kelly is a consistent player and Firth at half has now found his right position. The Arnold brothers are good and one of them, Dave, was perhaps unlucky in not being chosen for the reps. Jack Doolan as breakaway showed an improvement in form and it looks as though he has also found his right position."

Their 3rd Open side finished near the top of the grade with 9 wins and 4 losses while the 3rd Intermediate side struggled with 2 wins and 10 losses. The 6th B grade team also only won 3 games with 4 draws and 9 losses. On July 27 the 6th grade side played Northcote at Carlaw Park and the Sun newspaper wrote a short piece on the game. They said that “Nicklin on the wing showed that he has plenty of speed, and although not doing so well in the first half came to light well during the second and made some fine runs. Pearson on the other wind is also very speedy, but as yet cannot be called a heady player. Barlow at centre is favoured with the art of cutting in which he does to perfection… Lewis is sound on both the defence and attack, but the palm must got to halfback Vaughan, who is very clever and elusive. The forwards played well, especially in the second spell, those standing out for special mention being Tannihill, Milne and Brady.

A key match was played between Glen Lynn and Richmond 3rd Open sides on August 17 at Carlaw Park. The match was a curtain-raiser to the Northern Union Cup match between Auckland and Northland. The match was said to be the final for the championship. Although it was essentially second (Richmond) v third (Glen Lynn) with Ponsonby one point ahead of Richmond but with no games remaining. The Richmond side included players such as George Davis, Charles Dunn, Thompson, Stehr, and Roy Powell who would all play senior league for Richmond in the following years with Powell representing New Zealand in 1935 and 1936. Glen Lynn lost 2 points to 0 giving Richmond the competition points they needed to finish first. The Sun wrote “one of the hardest and most strenuous football battles ever fought out on Carlaw Park took place last Saturday when the Richmond third graders defeated Glen Lynn in the final of the championship competition by two points to nil… the game was a dour struggle from whistle to whistle, neither side crossing the line… For Glen Lynn, Dolan was the outstanding forward, and enjoyed a deal of the limelight, while Arnold, Wickham, Rogers, Glover and Everet all worked hard and went right through with their dogged play without letting up. Among the backs, Kelly at five eighths proved himself a star and was to a large extent responsible for breaking up many of the Richmond back movements. White on the wing managed some fine dashes down the line, and would certainly have been responsible for one try had he been favoured with stronger support”. J Hemmingway of their side was selected in the Auckland Junior representative side as was Arnold. On August 30 the Glen Lynn third grade side played the Newton 2nd grade side and showed how good they were by drawing 6-6. For Glen Lynn Hemmingson “made a good showing, but unfortunately had to leave the field with an injured ankle. Montgomery and White, the two wingers, worried the opposition a great deal with their strong running, the former especially made some great openings…. Halfback Firth is sound, but plays the bling a little too much. Among the Glen Lynn forwards, Glover, W. Arnold and Dolan shone out as fast following up forwards, while Everatt was always very solid”.

The 3rd Intermediate side finished 7th of eight teams with two wins and ten losses with one of their wins a default win over the Northcote & Birkenhead Ramblers. While the 6th grade B team fared no better winning three games, drawing four and losing nine to finish 8th of nine.

=== 1930 Glen Lynn (3rd Open, 4th, 6th, and 7th Grades) ===
The 3rd Open side finished 3rd with a 7 win, 1 draw, 6 loss record. On May 17 they played Kingsland Athletic who finished second, drawing 5-5.

The same weekend the Glen Lynn 4th grade side (which ultimately finished last) was defeated by City. The Sun wrote that “Power gave a fine display, other players who did well being A. White, Millens and Baldwin. Malham of the forwards is also a good player, but he should let the captain do all the talking”. The following weekend the club sent their full team lineup to the Auckland Star to be published on the Friday before the game and it was as follows: “E. Power, L. Crutcher, J. Baldwin, H. Brady, A. White, G. Malam, W. Millens, G. Newton, J. Morman, J. Barlow, P. Wickham, R. Nickelon, B. Bailey, D. Bennett, H. Larson, and R. Shaw”.

The 6th grade side was said to be “finding its feet, and in another week or so will have a great little team in the field. On Saturday the outstanding players were Boyd, Bath and J Bremnan”. The comments in the Sun may have been optimistic as they finished last losing all of their games. The 7th grade side had a similar record and finished last also.

On June 12 the Auckland Star wrote that the club had asked for financial assistance from the Auckland Rugby League at their weekly meeting. A decision on the matter was “deferred for further consideration”. In early September the club wrote to thank the league “for recent financial assistance” indicating that they had contributed money towards the club.

On July 18 the Sun newspaper wrote several paragraphs on the Glen Lynn sides matches the previous weekend (July 12). It was said that their 3rd grade team “after a battle royal, were beaten 8-5… It was a grand game, the teams being very evenly matched. Sainsbury was the mainstay of Glen Lynn, being unlucky not to have scored on several occasions. Everett played a good game, as did Montgomery, but “Monty” has one bad fault – he will not pass the ball when he is about to be or is tackled”. While the 4th grade side had played Richmond and was “a bit off colour. Ted Power at half, played an outstanding game. The fullback, Wickam was equally as good, while in the forwards Dyer and Milnes were A1. The forwards would do better if they were waiting for it to come back to them. Mormon, the winger, wants to pass the ball infield when he is blocked”. The same article wrote that the 7th grade team “is improving and the boys are playing great football. Last Saturday, against Avondale, they got the ball nearly every time from the scrum, and the combination of the backs was pretty to watch. The forwards are sound, Bath, the five-eighth, is a good boy, but the second five-eighths wants to try and run straight upfield instead of across. Bartrum on the wing, is going to go a long way in the game.

=== 1931 Glen Lynn (3rd Open, 3rd Intermediate), 5th, and 7th Grades) ===
Glen Lynn fielded four teams once again for the 1931 season. The Glenora club formed in 1931 and fielded a single side in the 3rd grade intermediate grade. They were named Glenora because they were based in the Glen Eden area but some of their players came from Oratia hence the combined name of ‘Glen’ ‘Ora’. Echoing previous years when the Glen Lynn club was ‘New Lynn’ they requested help from the New Lynn Borough Council in acquiring a playing area. The letter the Council received said that “a majority of the members were New Lynn boys”. They decided to “supply the club with details relative to an area existing for league football on the Great North Road, New Lynn”. The 3rd Intermediate, 5th, and 7th grade teams all finished well down the standings in their respective grades.

=== Disappearance of Glen Lynn ===
The 1932 season saw Glen Lynn cease to exist. Despite having four teams the season prior they failed to field any teams. Glenora only fielded one team which was in the third open grade so the former Glen Lynn players did not move to any neighbouring suburban sides.

=== New Lynn return and formation of Glenora ===
The 1933 season saw a New Lynn club reappear by itself with a 3rd grade and 5th grade side however the Glen Eden club did not reappear. The Glenora club had formed in 1931 and represented the Glen Eden area with players also travelling from Oratia hence the merged name of "Glen" and "Ora". They would grow to become the dominant side in the area ultimately winning 1st grade championships in 1962, 1997, 1998, 1999, and 2017. The club being based in Glen Eden at Harold Moody Park. With the present day New Lynn Stags club forming in 1967 and continuing until the present day based at Lawson Park in New Lynn.

=== Team records ===
==== Most senior team ====
The season record for the most senior team in the club.

Year	Grade	Club Name	Pld	W	D	L	PF	PA	PD	Pts	Position (Teams)
1926	3rd Grade Open	Glen Eden Rovers	15	0	0	5	2	68	-66	0	8th of 9 (most results not reported)
1927	3rd Grade Open (Walker Shield)	Glen Eden Rovers	11	0	0	2	6	17	-11	0	6th of 7 (most results not reported)
1928	3rd Grade Open (Walker Shield)	Glen Eden Rovers	13	3	0	5	37	46	-9	6	9th of 14
1929	3rd Grade Open (Hayward Shield)	Glen Lynn	13	9	0	4	84	35	+49	18	3rd of 8
1930	3rd Grade	Glen Lynn	14	7	1	6	118	146	-28	15	3rd of 8
1931	3rd Grade	Glen Lynn	9	0	0	5	2	97	-95	0	5th of 6 (most results not reported)
1926-31	TOTAL	-	75	19	1	27	249	409	-160	36	
