= Hec McDonald =

New Zealand international rugby league footballer

Personal information
- Full name: Hector Alison McDonald
- Born: 19 July 1900 Auckland, New Zealand
- Died: 25 September 1952 (aged 52) Te Kūiti, New Zealand

Playing information
- Weight: 79.4 kg (12 st 7 lb)
- Position: Lock, Prop, Second-row
Club
| Years | Team | Pld | T | G | FG | P |
|---|---|---|---|---|---|---|
| 1921–27 | Frankton Albions |
| 1922–23 | Matangi | 11 | 3 | 0 | 0 | 9 |
| 1922–23 | Cambridge (sub-union) | 5 | 0 | 0 | 0 | 0 |
| 1922–26 | Rotorua (sub-union) | 3 | 1 | 0 | 0 | 3 |
| 1923–25 | City Rovers (ARL) | 27 | 12 | 0 | 0 | 36 |
| | Total | 46 | 16 | 0 | 0 | 48 |
Representative
| Years | Team | Pld | T | G | FG | P |
| 1922 | Bay of Plenty | 1 | 0 | 0 | 0 | 0 |
| 1923–25 | Auckland | 8 | 3 | 0 | 0 | 9 |
| 1924 | Auckland Province | 1 | 0 | 0 | 0 | 0 |
| 1924 | New Zealand | 1 | 0 | 0 | 0 | 0 |
| 1925 | Auckland B | 4 | 2 | 1 | 0 | 8 |
| 1925 | New Zealand XIII | 1 | 0 | 0 | 0 | 0 |
| 1926–27 | South Auckland | 5 | 2 | 0 | 0 | 6 |

Hec McDonald was a rugby league player from New Zealand. In 1924 he represented New Zealand in 3 tests against England and in so doing became Kiwi number 165.

== Playing career ==
=== Waikato beginnings ===
Hec McDonald began playing rugby league around the age of 21 for the Frankton Albions in 1921 where he is mentioned as being "a new man" after an appearance against Pirates on May 21. In 1922 he played for a large number of teams including the newly formed Matangi club side, the Cambridge sub union team, the Rotorua sub union team and the Bay of Plenty side against the touring New South Wales team. He played for Matangi from May through to July in the fledgling Cambridge league competition. In a match against Athletics he was involved in 3 tries in a 23–0 win. The following weekend he played in a 5–3 loss to Suburbs where he was described as "a hard man to beat, playing on the ball well". The game was notable because it was the opening of the short lived League Park on Clare Street in Cambridge with Mayor Sam Lewis present for the ceremony. In a May 27 match against City, McDonald scored 3 tries in a 36–11 win. During his time playing for Matangi he was picked for the Cambridge B team to play against the Hamilton B team on June 24. He was then picked for the Cambridge side to play against Hamilton. They lost 21 points to 12 before playing Auckland at Carlaw Park (a ground he was to become familiar with) and were thrashed 73–29 by a side which featured 11 New Zealand international players.

McDonald was then picked to play for Rotorua against Tauranga in the first ever rugby league match played in Tauranga on September 16. The game had been organised to a large degree by former New Zealand international George Iles who had moved to Tauranga and attempted to establish the game there. McDonald scored a try after "a loose scramble" in a 29 to 28 win to Rotorua. McDonald was then selected for another historic match. He was chosen to play for the Bay of Plenty representative team against the touring "Kangaroos" which in fact was the touring New South Wales side. The match was played at Arawa Park, Rotorua on September 26 with the Bay of Plenty side featuring George Iles, and future Kiwi George Gardiner. The visiting New South Wales team featured the likes of Frank Burge and Reg Latta. New South Wales won the match 29 points to 5.

In 1923 McDonald was again playing for the Matangi side, and also made appearances for Cambridge against Hamilton on June 16 which they lost 32 points to 11 at Victoria Square in Cambridge with McDonald playing five eighths. They played a return match at Hinemoa Park in Hamilton a week later on June 23. Hinemoa was a new rugby league ground in Hamilton and McDonald was said to have played a "fine game" despite much of the field being heavy and partially underwater due to recent rains.

=== City Rovers, Auckland, and New Zealand debut's ===
Hec McDonald first played for the City Rovers on August 18, 1923, with his name first appearing in their team list the day before. He was described as "a recent City recruit, [who] showed fine form in the open and should be of great assistance to his side". City had needed to win the match against Athletic to force a playoff for the title and McDonald joined the side that week. City won the game 11–8 in front of 8000 spectators at Carlaw Park, and then in the championship final the following week McDonald played again in an 8–7 victory to claim the 1923 Auckland Rugby League championship. McDonald was said to be "playing a fine game" during the final win. It was said in The New Zealand Herald that "on the form displayed in his first two games for City, McDonald is worthy of consideration by the League selectors". McDonald's first try for City came in a 49–12 win over Devonport United in a Roope Rooster semi-final win where he was said to be "the outstanding man in all-round work". McDonald then played in the final against Ponsonby United which City lost 14 points to 3. A writer for the Auckland Star said of McDonald that he gave "a fine display" and "is one of the best forwards playing in the league this season".

Hec McDonald made his debut for Auckland against an Auckland Province side made up of players from Auckland and also the Waikato region. McDonald scored 2 tries in a high scoring 44–15 win to the Auckland city team. It was said of his forward display that he "was easily the best". His final game of the season came in a match for Auckland against South Auckland for the Northern Union Challenge Cup. He scored a try after following up a kick as Auckland won the match 35–11.

In 1924 he began the season still in a City Rovers jersey. He was joined in the team by his brother Montgomery McDonald before his brother transferred to Newton Rangers early in the 1925 season. He played 4 matches for them before being selected in the Auckland team to play against the touring Australian Universities side. They played 3 matches against them with McDonald playing in all of them. They were played within an 11-day period at Carlaw Park from June 4 to June 14 and saw the Auckland team win all three matches 15–7, 17-2 and 14–4. In the first match he played in the second row alongside New Zealand "Legend of League" Bert Avery where McDonald was said to be "the best of a fine bunch…, he was brilliant". In the 17–2 victory McDonald was also prominent despite the match being played on a surface covered in water with some suggestion beforehand that it should be postponed. For the third match McDonald was joined in the second row by Nelson Bass after Avery had injured his knee in the match prior. Auckland won 14–4 with McDonald said to be "again the best forward on the ground".

After 4 further games for City McDonald was named in the reserves for the Auckland team to play against the touring England team but did not take the field as reserves were only used at this time to replace injured players during the first half of matches. He was then named in the reserves for the Auckland Provincial team to play England but after Tut Wilson was unable to play he replaced him in the starting line up. McDonald played well, being "noticeable in fine hustling work" in a 28–13 loss in front of 7000 at Carlaw Park

He was then selected in the reserves for the first test match between New Zealand and England after being initially named to start but being replaced by Neil Mouat from the West Coast side.

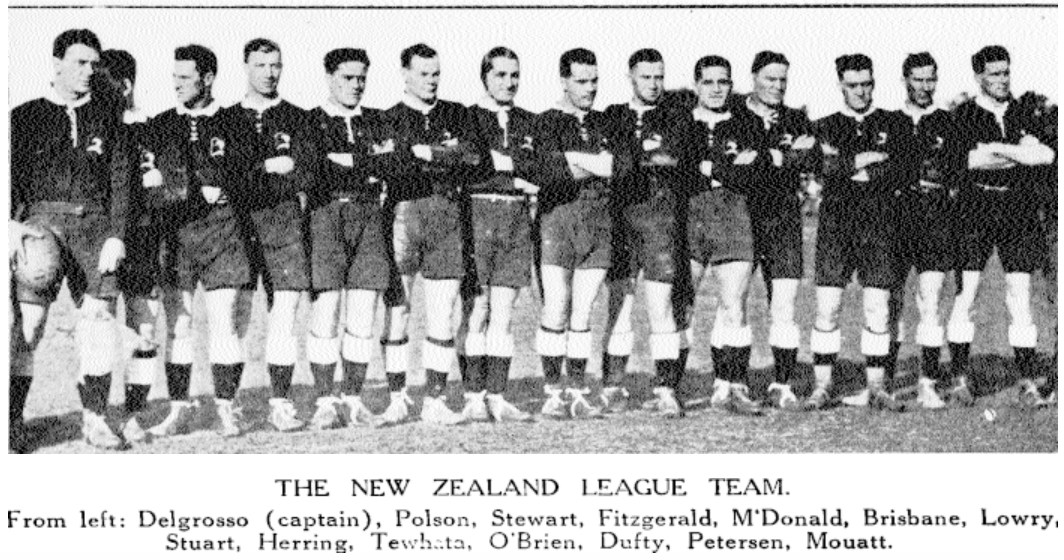

He was then named in the squad to travel south for the second and third tests which were to be played in Wellington and Dunedin respectively. New Zealand won the first test 16 to 8 at Carlaw Park, and followed it up with a win in the second test by 13 to 11 at the Basin Reserve in Wellington. McDonald was to make his debut for New Zealand in the third test played at Tahuna Park, Dunedin. An enormous crowd of 12,000 turned out to see England victorious by 31 points to 11 with McDonald playing lock in a forward pack featuring Jim O'Brien, Sam Lowrie, Ernie Herring, Neil Mouat, and Lou Peterson. McDonald was said to have played well and he along with O'Brien "showing up at all times".

In 1925 McDonald played again for City Rovers, and after playing in 7 games for them he was selected for the Auckland A team to play against the Auckland B team. The match was part of a series of three trial matches played on the same afternoon to try and choose the New Zealand team to tour Australia. The other matches were North Island against South Island and Auckland C against South Auckland. McDonald's Auckland A team (a B team for all intents and purposes due to the large number of first choice players representing the North Island team) was defeated by Auckland B by 5 points to 0. McDonald missed selection for the New Zealand team but was to play against them less than a week later for Auckland, with New Zealand winning 16 to 9. Following City's Roope Rooster semi-final win over Devonport United, Auckland played a midweek match against South Auckland for the Northern Union Challenge Cup. McDonald played in the second row in a 24–16 win by the Auckland side at Carlaw Park in front of 3,000 spectators. McDonald was then involved in the Roope Rooster final where City lost to rivals Ponsonby United 10–5 before a 7,500 strong crowd.

Following the New Zealand teams return from Australia they played Auckland at Carlaw Park and McDonald was chosen for the Auckland team. The national side trounced McDonald's Auckland by 41 points to 17 in front of a massive crowd of 15,000. He missed selection for the New Zealand team again for the matches against the touring Queensland team but was selected for the Auckland B team for their southern tour where they would play matches against the West Coast, Canterbury, and Wellington. McDonald appeared in all 3 matches and scored a try and kicked a goal in their 68 to 9 win over Wellington at Newton Park, Wellington. The matches against West Coast and Canterbury were won 22-15 and lost 6-5 respectively. McDonald then stayed in Wellington to play for a combined team against Queensland made up of players from Auckland, Waikato, Wellington, and Canterbury. They were defeated by the tourists by 44 points to 20. McDonald was said to have had a "fine game, his fast following up delighting the spectators.

McDonald then departed City Rovers and left the club before their Stormont Shield final match with Ponsonby United. In the 1925 season he had played for them 14 times and scored 9 tries which was the equal 4th most in the 1925 Auckland Rugby League season. In total he made 29 appearances for them, along with 8 for Auckland, 1 for Auckland Province, and 4 for Auckland B.

=== Return to the Waikato ===
It was thought that McDonald would return to play for City in 1926 and he was even listed in their teams for the early games in the season but he did not play as he had not arrived back in Auckland. It was then announced in late May that he "was expected in Auckland last week, as he intended to play for City again, but he has evidently altered his plans" and is now "one of the leading players under the control of the newly-established League centre at Rotorua. He was to represent Rotorua who were a sub-union of the South Auckland league and the South Auckland representative team several times. South Auckland these days would be better known as the Waikato rugby league team.

He played for Rotorua against a Hamilton/Lower Waikato combined team in June with his side losing 23 to 15. McDonald then played in matches for South Auckland against Wellington and Auckland on June 23 and June 27 respectively. He scored a try in the Wellington match which South Auckland won 16 to 12, while his side was soundly beaten by his former Auckland team 49 to 15. McDonald then captained Rotorua to a 17-2 loss at the hand of a Lower Waikato side on August 7. Just 4 days later he played for South Auckland against the touring Otago side and scored a try in a 30-12 loss.

On October 9 McDonald returned to Carlaw Park to play against Auckland for the Northern Union Challenge Cup with Auckland running out the winners by 25 points to 8. It was said of McDonald that "playing as the loose forward McDonald showed untiring dash, and was prominent in every attacking movement that the visitors launched". In 1927 McDonald once again returned to Carlaw Park playing for South Auckland in an October 15 game. This time he was playing five eighth and captaining the side. He helped guide his side to a 29–12 win over Auckland and in so doing they won the Northern Union Challenge Cup It is unknown if McDonald continued to play rugby league after this match.
