= Jack Ellis (rugby league) =

New Zealand international rugby league footballer

Personal information
- Full name: Edwin Horace Ellis
- Born: 3 March 1899; Kuripuni, Masterton, Wellington Region, New Zealand
- Died: 24 August 1964 (aged 65); Wellington, New Zealand

Playing information
- Position: Prop, Second-row
Club
Years	Team	Pld	T	G	FG	P
1924–26	Marist
Representative
Years	Team	Pld	T	G	FG	P
1924	Canterbury
1925	New Zealand	0	0	0	0	0

Edwin Horace "Jack" Ellis is a New Zealand rugby player who played in the rugby league and represented New Zealand.

== Playing career ==
Ellis played in the Canterbury Rugby League competition and represented Canterbury in 1924.

He played in six matches for New Zealand during the 1925 tour of Australia. No test matches were played during the tour.
