= Glenavon School =

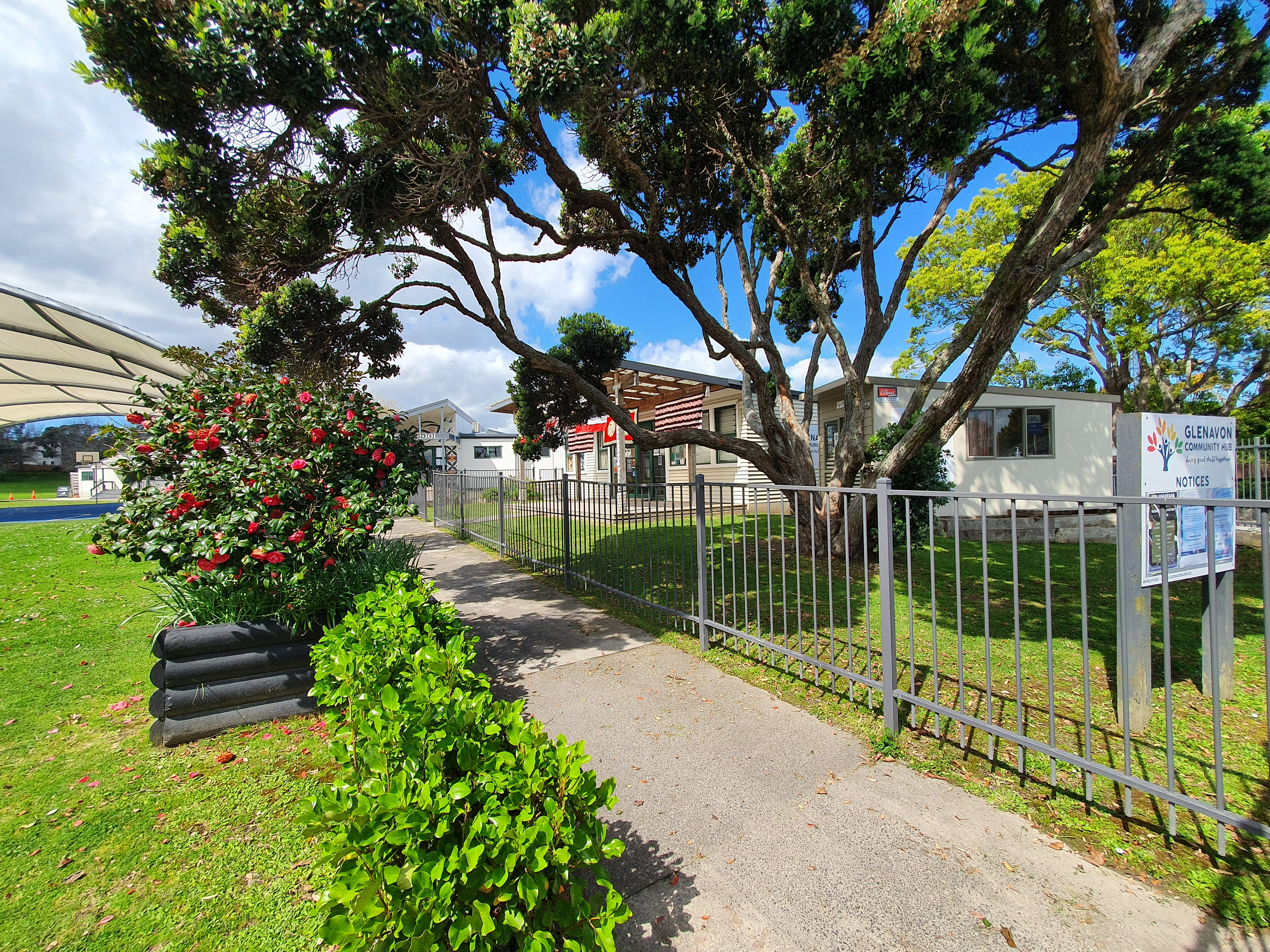

Location
- 340 Blockhouse Bay Rd, Blockhouse Bay, Auckland; 36.9102°S 174.7022°E

Information
- Type: Co-ed state primary
- Motto: Achieving the extraordinary
- Established: 1955
- Ministry of Education Institution no.: 1290
- Principal: Mr John Hunte
- Enrolment: 352 (July 2026)
- Socio-economic decile: 1
- Website: glenavon.school.nz

Glenavon School is a school in Auckland, New Zealand, opened in 1955, catering for pre-school (kindergarten) through to Year 8. There is also a school for children with special educational needs on the campus.

Glenavon Kindergarten (part of Auckland Kindergarten Association) has been operating on Glenavon School grounds since February 2025 and provides 30 hours of free early childhood education for children aged 2–5 years old.

== Facilities ==
Glenavon School has a Bikes in Schools bike and scooter path for the community to use outside of school hours. The track includes a wooden bridge, pump roller line and short mountain bike track.
