= United Suburbs League Football Club =

Defunct NZ rugby league club, based in Auckland

United Suburbs
Club information
- Full name: United Suburbs League Football Club
- Short name: United Suburbs
- Colours: Maroon, Gold, & Black
- Founded: 1924
- Exited: 1926

Former details
- Grounds: Auckland Domain; Carlaw Park
- Competition: Auckland Rugby League

United Suburbs League Football Club were a rugby league club in Auckland. They competed from 1924 until 1926 in the Auckland Rugby League competitions.

== History ==
=== 1924 formation ===
The United Suburbs League Football Club were formed in March 1924.

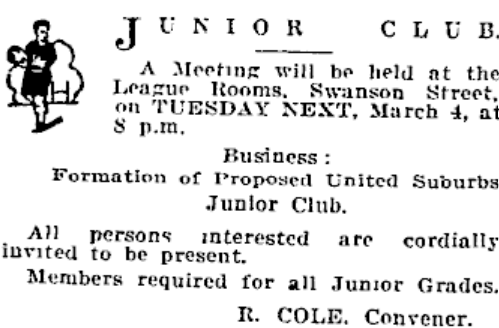
First ever advertisement.

A notice was published in the Auckland Star on March 1 proposing the formation of a junior club. The convenor of the meeting was R. Cole, and it said "all persons interested are cordially invited to be present. Members required for all junior grades". It was held at the Auckland Rugby League rooms on Swanson Street at 8pm on Tuesday, March 4. R. Cole had been the honorary secretary of the Ponsonby United rugby league club the previous year. In September 1923 a "United Cricket Club" held their first annual meeting and Cole was elected president. The United Suburbs club was not specifically located in any one place or representing any particular suburb. It was reported in April that they were "Western Suburbs" and along with New Lynn and Leys Institute were a new club that was affiliated with Ponsonby. It is likely that they drew on junior players from the suburbs to the west of Ponsonby. The rugby league club never had an official home ground and would typically either play at the Auckland Domain or at their opponents ground.

The Auckland Rugby League approved their affiliation at their April 2 meeting. It was said that their colours would be gold with a black badge. Then two weeks later at the April 16 meeting of the Auckland Rugby League their colours were registered as maroon and gold. Presumably maroon shorts, gold jerseys with a black badge. At the same meeting they were allotted Tuesday nights for trainings at Carlaw Park. The club held a practice for its players at the Auckland Domain on Saturday at 2.30pm on April 19.

=== 1924 season (2nd, 3rd, and 4th grades) ===
The club entered three teams in the Auckland Rugby League competition in the 2nd, 3rd, and 4th grades. Their first games were on April 26 however they were preseason games. Their first ever official competition matches were on May 3. Their team lists were published in the newspapers and were, Second Grade: Perry, Moros, Whinray, Laurie, Montague, Laybourn, Hudson, Fryer, Maddren, Stephens, McCormick, Buffett, McMillan, Wrathall, Cole, Mudgway, Lloyd; Third Grade: Barrow, Dean, McKeown, Davison, McKay, Ritchie, Gardiner, Murray, Foley, Paltridge, Henriksen, Berryman, Gutry, Howard, Maddren; Fourth Grade: Henriksen, Stephens, Little, Hatton, Cunningham, Lee, Hogan, Gearey, Chandler, Lathrope, Nelson, Nicol, Murray, Webb, Leslie, and Fletcher.

The newspapers always published the club league fixtures however reporting of results was unreliable. The second grade team appeared to have a good season as of their 6 results that were reported they won 5 of them. Their first ever game was their practice match with Otahuhu Rovers at Ōtāhuhu on April 26. A week later they played the same opponent in their first match. Their first result was not reported until May 10. They played Newton Rangers at Grey Lynn Park, the home of the Richmond Rovers at 3pm with Clayton refereeing the match. United Suburbs won 18–0 with Raymond Laybourne and Moros scoring two tries each, and Lloyd and Maddren one each. On May 31 they defeated Ellerslie United 11–4 at the Ellerslie Racecourse. Laybourne, Lloyd, and Wrathall scored their tries with Wrathall converting one. Their other reported wins were against Māngere United 15–0 on June 14, 10–2 against the same opponent on August 9, and 8–5 against Newton on August 16. Their only reported loss was to Otahuhu on July 19, 5 points to 0. In their win over Māngere, Murayme and Morris scored tries and Wrathall converted both. It was reported the same day that Laybourne broke a rib during the game and was taken to hospital. Two days later the New Zealand Herald said that he was aged 18 and living in Grey Lynn and was "progressing well" from his injury.

With the season drawing to a close Laurie was selected in the forwards for the Auckland Junior side to play Hamilton on August 30 at Carlaw Park. He was chosen for the same representative side for the return match in Hamilton on October 4 at Steele Park with Auckland winning 17–8.

The United Suburbs third grade side had five results reported, winning two and losing three. Their first ever game was against Richmond Rovers at Grey Lynn Park. On June 14 they beat Māngere United 19 to 16 at the Auckland Domain. W. Tate scored three tries, and Paultridge two, with Paultridge also kicking two goals. After losses to Athletic, Richmond, and New Lynn they beat Mangere 13–8 on August 16.

Their fourth grade side played 14 games but only had 10 results reported and finished mid table. Their first game was against Takapuna on April 26 at Birkenhead refereed by Mullarvey. On July 5 they beat Takapuna 6–3 with Chandler and Hogan scoring tries. On August 9 it was reported that they beat Ponsonby B 21–0 and were four men short, though it was more likely the other way round as Ponsonby B was one of the best teams in the competition.

==== United Suburbs cricket club ====
At the end of the 1924 season the United Suburbs cricket club applied for senior status for the start of the 1925/26 season and they were accepted. They went on to win the Suburban Championship.

=== 1925 season ===
The 1925 season saw United Suburbs field a 2nd grade team, two 3rd grade sides, and a 6th grade team in the B grade. They held their annual meeting on Thursday, March 11 at the League Rooms. Their secretary was R. Cole. The Second Grade team published for their first game was Cooper, Moros, Wattam, Laybourn. Wrathall, Hill, Cole (2), Chapman, French, Stephens, McMillan, Fryer, Tate, Wilson, Buffett. While their Third Grade A team was Stephens, Hatton, Ritchie, McKeown, Gardner, Perryman. Gutry (2), Dean. Henrikson. Woodford, Foley, Barrow, Howard, Cunningham, Verrall". The B team in the same grade was Mills, Henriksen (2), Little, Maddren, Wilson. Hogan, Phipps, Porter, Flestcher, Wallace, Brown, McKay (2), Coster, Kahi, Chandler".

The second grade side had four scheduled matches but only one was reported, a 10–2 loss to Ponsonby in round 2 and the withdrew from the competition after round 4 on May 30. The third grade sides seemed to have fared poorly also. The A team was scheduled for twelve games and lost the only three games reported. While the B team had a default win over Otahuhu a 0–0 draw with Kingsland, and five losses. The B Grade team however managed to win through to the knockout final against Richmond B but were thrashed 32–0. The United Suburbs side to play in the final were Scarborough, Watkins. Munce, Gore, Shepherd, Wlls, Keesing, Ralph, Ardern, Green, Weston, Cooke, McKay, Standish, McPherson, and Nadin.

=== 1926 ===
The 1926 season saw United Suburbs field two teams in the 3rd grade open and 3rd grade intermediate. The 3rd grade open side played 15 games and had six results reported which were three wins and three losses. While the 3rd grade intermediate side withdrew after two scheduled matches which they most likely defaulted or lost very badly. They held their annual meeting on Thursday, March 11 at Carlaw Park. Their honorary secretary was once again R. Cole.

The 3rd grade open team began the season playing Athletic at the Auckland Domain on May 8. Their team list for the game was Henriksen, Stephens, Fryer, Henderson, Gutry, Little, Hatton, Berryman, Howard, McKay, Bainbridge, Wilson, and Buffett. They lost 24 to 8. Their team for the following weeks game against Glen Eden was McKay, Wilson (2), Berryman, Henriksen (2), Stephens, Hatton, Fyrer, Gutry (2), Mills, Henderson, Howard, Richards, Little, and Billward. United Suburbs had their first win of the season by 11 points to 0. They were next due to play Māngere United at the Māngere Black Bridge Ground which would have been close to the intersection of present-day Walmsley Road and McKenzie Road in Māngere. The game was postponed and was eventually played on May 29. They posted a notice in the newspapers for the team to meet at the General Post Office at the bottom of Queen Street to travel to Mangere. They recorded their second win, 8–0. They played games against Ponsonby, Ellerslie, Devonport, Northcote, New Lynn, Athletic, and Māngere United but no results were reported though they seemed to have lost to Athletic (Maritime). Then on August 21 they defaulted to Ponsonby. The following week they did manage to field a team in a game against Glen Eden which included Ha Hon, Little, Stephens, Montague, Henriksen (2), Berryman, Richards, Beere, Sharp, Gutry, McKay, Carson, Fryer, and Buffett. They played games against Devonport, New Lynn, and Māngere with no scores reported before a 3–0 loss to Grafton.

The last club game that they ever played was probably against the same opponent on October 16, 1926. It was at Point Chevalier at 3pm with Gedye refereeing. United Suburbs started a rugby union club beyond this point and they also fielded a cricket side for many seasons in the 1920s and 30s.

== Season records ==
=== Highest graded team in each season ===
Season	Grade	Name	Pld	W	D	L	PF	PA	PD	Pts	Position*
1924	2nd Grade	United Suburbs	6	5	0	1	62	25	+37	10	3rd of 12
1925	3rd Grade	United Suburbs A	14	1	1	4	9	84	+75	3	10th of 17
1926	3rd Grade Open	United Suburbs	15	3	0	3	37	24	+13	6	3rd of 9
1924–26	Total		35	9	1	8	108	125	−17	19	

* These positions are all approximate, as many results are missing
