= 1926 Auckland Rugby League season =

The 1926 season of the Auckland Rugby League was its 17th.

Ponsonby won the Monteith Shield, the major first grade title after defeating City Rovers in the final. Richmond won their first ever senior trophy when they won the Roope Rooster. On the last week of the season these teams met for the Stormont Shield with Ponsonby winning by 15 points to 5 over. Northcote won the B Division championship, with Kingsland winning the Stallard Cup for taking out the B division knockout competition. The representative season was dominated by a long series of trial matches to assist in selecting the New Zealand team to tour England.

Preceded by 1925	17th Auckland Rugby League season 1926	Succeeded by 1927

== Auckland Rugby League News ==
=== Club teams by grade participation ===
Team	1st	B Div.	2nd	3rd Open	3rd Int.	4th	5th	6th A	6th B	Schools	Total
Richmond Rovers	1	0	1	0	1	1	1	1	1	1	8
Grafton Athletic	1	0	1	1	0	1	1	1	1	0	7
City Rovers	1	0	1	0	0	1	0	2	1	0	6
Ponsonby United	1	0	1	1	0	1	1	0	0	0	5
Devonport United	1	0	1	1	1	0	1	0	0	0	5
Otahuhu Rovers	0	1	1	0	0	1	0	1	0	1	5
Ellerslie United	0	1	0	1	0	1	1	0	0	0	4
Newton Rangers	1	0	1	0	1	1	0	0	0	0	4
Northcote & Birkenhead Ramblers	0	1	0	1	0	0	1	1	0	0	4
Māngere United	0	1	1	1	1	0	0	0	0	0	4
Parnell	0	1	0	0	1	1	0	0	0	1	4
Kingsland Rovers	0	1	1	0	1	0	0	0	0	0	3
Marist Old Boys	1	0	1	0	0	1	0	0	0	0	3
Point Chevalier	0	0	1	0	0	1	0	0	1	0	3
Glen Eden Rovers	0	0	0	1	1	0	0	0	0	0	2
New Lynn	0	0	0	1	0	1	0	0	0	0	2
United Suburbs	0	0	0	1	1	0	0	0	0	0	2
Akarana	0	0	0	0	0	0	0	1	1	0	2
Grey Lynn Schoolboys	0	0	0	0	0	0	0	0	0	1	1
Newmarket Schoolboys	0	0	0	0	0	0	0	0	0	1	1
Papatoetoe Schoolboys	0	0	0	0	0	0	0	0	0	1	1
Total	7	6	11	9	8	11	6	7	5	6	76

=== Athletic club name change ===
At the annual general meeting of the Athletic Rugby League Football Club the idea of adopting the name of Grafton Athletic was discussed though no decision was made at the time it was later agreed to change the club name to Grafton. They were known as 'Maritime' from their formation in 1918 and remained as such for four years until the start of the 1922 season when they changed their name to Athletic. They remained 'Athletic' for four years until deciding to change their name again in this 1926 season to Grafton Athletic. There had previously already been a Grafton Athletic club which formed in 1914 under the leadership of Karl Ifwersen and they survived for seven years until the 1920 season which was their last after Ifwersen switched back to the rugby code.

=== Glen Eden Rovers ===
The Glen Eden Rovers club formed to represent the Glen Eden suburb in West Auckland. At the time it was a predominantly rural area marked by the train station and Waikumete Cemetery. They existed as a stand alone club from 1926 to 1928 before merging with New Lynn League Football Club in 1929 to be named Glen Lynn. In 1932 the merged club did not field any teams, then in 1932 the New Lynn club reformed while a new club had formed in Glen Eden named Glenora representing Glen Eden and neighbouring Oratia area in 1931. The New Lynn club folded once more 2 years later leaving Glenora to be the only club in the area until 1967 when the present day New Lynn Stags club formed.

=== Senior competitions ===
Nominations were received for 13 teams to compete in the Senior Grade. It was decided to have an A section and a B section like the 1925 season. In the A section competing for the Monteith Shield would be the same 7 teams as the previous year. They were Ponsonby United, City Rovers, Marist Old Boys, Devonport United, Richmond Rovers, Newton Rangers, and Grafton Athletic (previously named 'Maritime' from 1918–21 and then Athletic from 1922–25). The same 5 teams would compete in the B section with the addition of Parnell. The teams in that section were Northcote, Kingsland, Ellerslie, Mangere (not the present day club), Otahuhu, and Parnell.

Jim Parkes who had moved to Auckland and begun playing for Richmond was also to coach the side. With the Monteith Shield competition nearing its later stages L Taylor joined the Richmond club from the Whitiora club in Hamilton. He scored 54 points in just 6 games for Richmond which meant he finished as the second highest scorer for the season behind Maurice Wetherill. During the season the New Zealand team was chosen to tour England and many clubs were hard hit by player losses to the tour. Wetherill was almost a certainty to make the tour but was unavailable to tour. He remained with his City Rovers team who qualified for the final with Ponsonby United but could not lead them to the title.

=== Carlaw Park ===
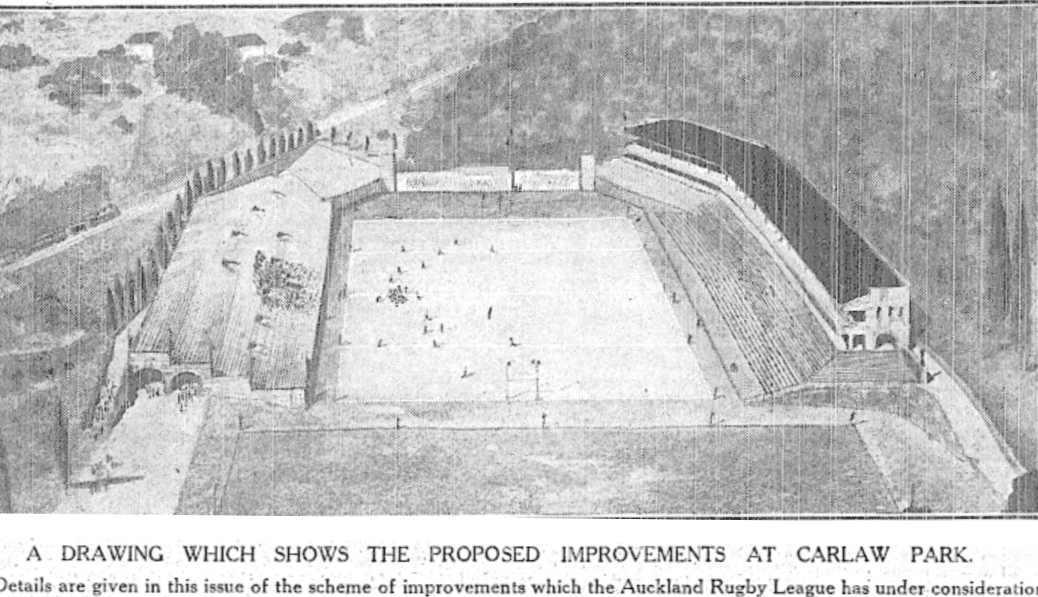
The proposed plans for Carlaw Parks redevelopment as reported in December, 1926.

Albert Asher the well known former New Zealand international was appointed to work on the ground staff at Carlaw Park. He would be busy mid season when torrential rain leading up to the round 5 matches forced their abandonment. A large hole opened up on the number one field due to water overflowing from the railway embankment and the surrounding hills overwhelmed the surface drains. "As a result, the water forced its way back, emerging from a joint in the main pipe. The ground for some feet around was raised and, when it subsided, an open hole was revealed". It took several days to repair the playing area which was open again for the following weekend. In December proposed plans for Carlaw Park's redevelopment were released though they were not carried out as shown in the image. The image showed the terraces becoming a large multilevel stand with a terrace type stand where the railway stand was at the time.

=== Representative program ===
A large number of representative and trial matches were played on Carlaw Park during the course of the season. The New Zealand team was to tour England later in the year and so several trial matches were played including Auckland v South Auckland, North Island v South Island, A v B team matches, a 'probables' v 'possibles' game, Auckland v The Rest of New Zealand, and ultimately after the team had been selected Auckland played them before they departed. Then near the end of the season Auckland defended the Northern Union Challenge Cup 3 times against Otago, Canterbury, and South Auckland (Waikato). The season was then concluded with an Auckland Colts match against the B Division representative side.

The Auckland members of the New Zealand team to tour England were:Craddock Dufty (Grafton), Charles Gregory (Marist), George Gardiner (Ponsonby), Jim Parkes (Richmond), Lou Brown (City), Ben Davidson (City), Jack Kirwan (Marist), Hec Brisbane (Marist), Hector Cole (Ponsonby), Stan Webb (Devonport), Frank Delgrosso (Ponsonby), Ernie Herring (Grafton), Arthur Singe (Marist), Bert Avery (Grafton). Avery was to captain the touring side.

During the tour 7 players went on strike due to a large number of issues they had with the management of the tour and upon their return the New Zealand Rugby League administration banned each of them for life. The only Aucklander to be among the strikers banned was Arthur Singe, the Marist Old Boys hooker. He had joined them after switching from rugby in 1921 where he had represented the New Zealand Army team in 1919 on their British and South African tours and Auckland in 8 matches. He played 48 times for Marist, 15 times for Auckland and made 8 appearances for New Zealand before his ban. The ban was eventually lifted by the New Zealand Rugby League in 1962, 26 years after his death in 1936.

=== Obituary ===
==== Robert Alexander Bovaird ====
On 30 December 1925 Robert (Bert) Alexander Bovaird died at the age of 34. He was the secretary of the Auckland Rugby League Referees association for the past 3 years and had refereed for several years including at senior level after previously being a player. He was "a very painstaking and obliging official, and carried out his duties with credit and satisfaction". He had owned a general store on Great North Road at Morningside and his body was found in the Auckland Domain in the morning after he had died of a self inflicted gun shot wound. The representatives of the Referees Association acted as pall-bearers at the request of relatives. He left behind a wife, Valerie Bovaird (nee. Tattersall), and an 8 year old daughter (Audrey).

== Monteith Shield (first grade championship) ==
On 22 May all A and B division matches were postponed due to poor weather. Carlaw Park also suffered damage when water overflowed from the railway embankment and adjoining hills which proved too much for the surface drains. It caused the ground to subside and a hole to open up which would take some time to repair.

=== Monteith Shield standings ===
With 1 round remaining Ponsonby was on 18 competition points and City were on 20 competition points. City had a bye and Ponsonby were due to play Grafton however owing to the likely outcome of Ponsonby defeating Grafton Athletic (who were last) which would mean the two teams would be tied on points the ARL decided to have Ponsonby and City playoff for the title instead. This was a regular method of deciding the title winners through this era and had happened in 1911, 1914, 1915, 1923, and 1924. Ponsonby won 13–8 and the result is included in the standings.

Team	Pld	W	D	L	F	A	Pts
Ponsonby United	12	10	0	2	256	153	20
City Rovers	13	10	0	3	279	168	20
Marist Old Boys	11	7	0	4	167	144	14
Devonport United	11	5	0	6	223	149	10
Richmond Rovers	11	3	0	8	142	176	6
Newton Rangers	11	3	0	8	185	305	6
Grafton Athletic	11	2	0	9	112	269	4

=== Monteith Shield fixtures ===
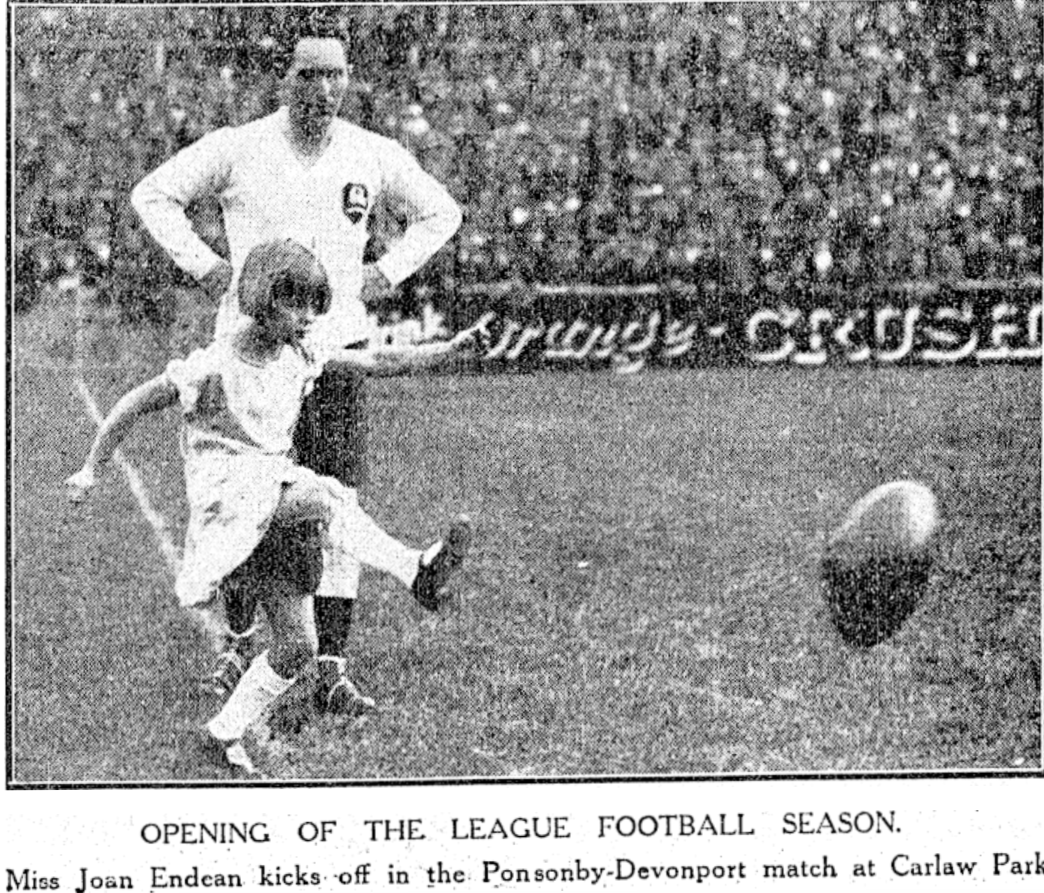
Joan Endean kicking off the 1926 season. Referee William Mincham is watching. Joan was one of vice patron John Albert Endean's 5 daughters.

In Round 12 new rules were introduced regarding the play the ball, mirroring rules adopted by the New South Wales Rugby League which made the games more open but it was stated in The New Zealand Herald that "it is evident the players will need more schooling to make the interpretation of this rule more effective. In the match between Ponsonby and Richmond every advantage was taken of the referee's awkward position, and some very unfair tactics were adopted in securing the ball from the ruck".

==== Round 1 ====
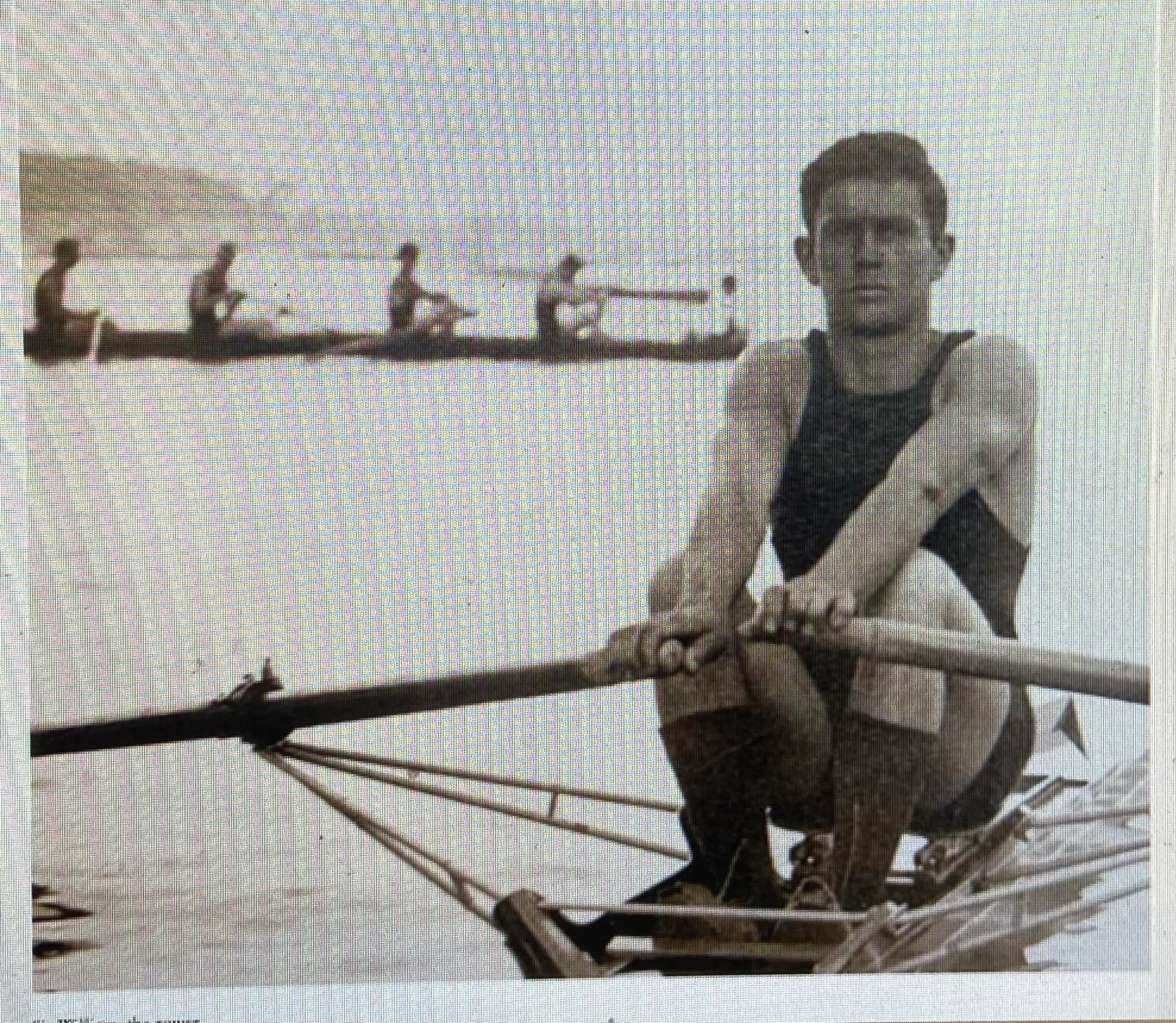
Sir William was New Zealand's Single Sculls national title holder in 1923, 1924, 1926 and 1927.

In the match between Ponsonby and Devonport Lyall Stewart went off after 20 minutes with an injury but was able to be replaced, later Julius Laing fractured his ankle while Charles Webb also went off injured during the second half leaving Devonport with just 11 players. Thomas Richards, their fullback also received a compound fracture of the middle finger and was taken to hospital. Neville St George was also injured during the match and missed several games. New Zealand single skulls rowing champion of 1923, 1924, 1926, and 1927 William Stevenson debuted for Richmond. During the season he quit playing for them as he was worried that playing rugby league might affect his amateur status in rowing despite the fact that players were not paid as such for playing rugby league in New Zealand. Alf Scott scored a try for Devonport. In the recently completed 1925/26 cricket season he made his first class debut for Auckland.

24 April	Ponsonby	31–21	Devonport	Carlaw Park 1
3:00	Try: Frank Delgrosso, Len Ward, Sydney Usher, Dooley Moore, R Allen, Leonard Riley 2 Con: Frank Delgrosso 4 Pen: Frank Delgrosso		Try: Horace Dixon, Alf Scott, Julius Laing 2, Allan Seagar; Con: Alf Scott 3	Attendance: 7,000; Referee: William Mincham

24 April	City	39–16	Newton	Carlaw Park 2
3:00	Try: Nelson Bass 2, George Wade, Maurice Wetherill 3, Ben Davidson 2, G Cargill; Con: Nelson Bass 4, Selby Crewther; Pen: Selby Crewther		Try: Clarrie Polson 2, George Morman, Bert Little; Con: Arthur Mansill 2	Attendance: 7,000; Referee: R Taylor

24 April	Richmond	23–3	Grafton	Auckland Domain
3:00	Try: Jim Parkes 2, Frederick Bass, Ralph Jenkinson, Hyland; Con: Mick Carroll 4		Try: Lee	Referee: A Saunders

==== Round 2 ====
Hec Brisbane broke his collarbone in Marist's win over Grafton. The Marist team was captained by Jack Kirwan for the first time after long serving captain, Billy Ghent had transferred to the City club.

1 May	Ponsonby	30–20	City	Carlaw Park 1
3:00	Try: Dempsey, Dooley Moore, Ivan Littlewood, Tim Peckham 2, Wilfred McNeil; Con: Frank Delgrosso 5 Pen: Frank Delgrosso		Try: Lou Brown 3, Ernie Mackie; Con: Selby Crewther 2 Pen: Nelson Bass; Drop: Selby Crewther	Referee: Les Bull

1 May	Marist	31–11	Grafton	Carlaw Park 2
3:00	Try: Hec Brisbane, Con Lineen, Bernard Sweeney 2, Charles Gregory, Phil Brady, Gus Nicholson; Con: Arthur Singe 3 Pen: Arthur Singe 2		Try: Bert Avery, Jones, Ernie Herring; Con: Craddock Dufty	Referee: Percy Rogers

1 May	Devonport	5–13	Richmond	Devonport Domain
3:00	Try: Alf Harper; Con: Unknown x 1		Try: W Little, William Stevenson, Unknown x 1 Con: Jim Parkes 2	Referee: H Taylor

==== Round 3 ====
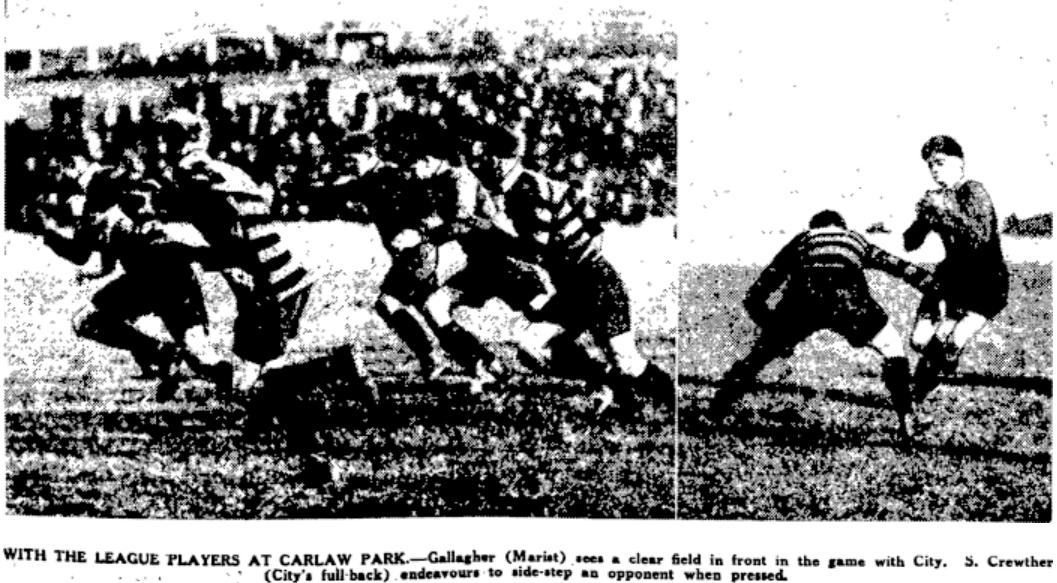
Percy Gallagher of Marist who had come on for the injured Albert Gregory against Devonport, and Selby Crewther, the City fullback trying to beat a Richmond defender.

Ponsonby's win over Newton in this round was a club milestone, being their 100th first grade win. In their 17th season and 163rd match they became the second club in Auckland to do this after City Rovers achieved the feat 2 seasons earlier.

8 May	Marist	19–15	Devonport	Carlaw Park 1
3:00	Try: Arthur Singe, Jack Kirwan, Jim O'Brien; Con: Arthur Singe 2 Pen: Arthur Singe 3		Try: Len Scott 2, Alf Harper, Harry Douglas; Con: Clinton Boryer; Pen: Alf Scott	Attendance: 6,000; Referee: A Saunders

8 May	City	21–11	Richmond	Carlaw Park 2
3:00	Try: George Wade, Harry Hawkes, Lou Brown, J Lewis, Billy Ghent; Con: Selby Crewther 2 Pen: Selby Crewther		Try: Mick Carroll, Ken Hyland; Con: Mick Carroll 2 Pen: Mick Carroll	Attendance: 6,000; Referee: A Taylor

8 May	Ponsonby	46–13	Newton	Auckland Domain
3:00	Try: Ivan Littlewood 2, Leonard Riley 3, George Gardiner 3, Victor Fagan, Bert Payne; Con: Leonard Riley, Frank Delgrosso 4, Victor Fagan 2, Tim Peckham		Try: W Little, Arthur Mansill, Alan Clarke; Con: Clarrie Polson; Pen: Clarrie Polson	Referee: T Hill

==== Round 4 ====
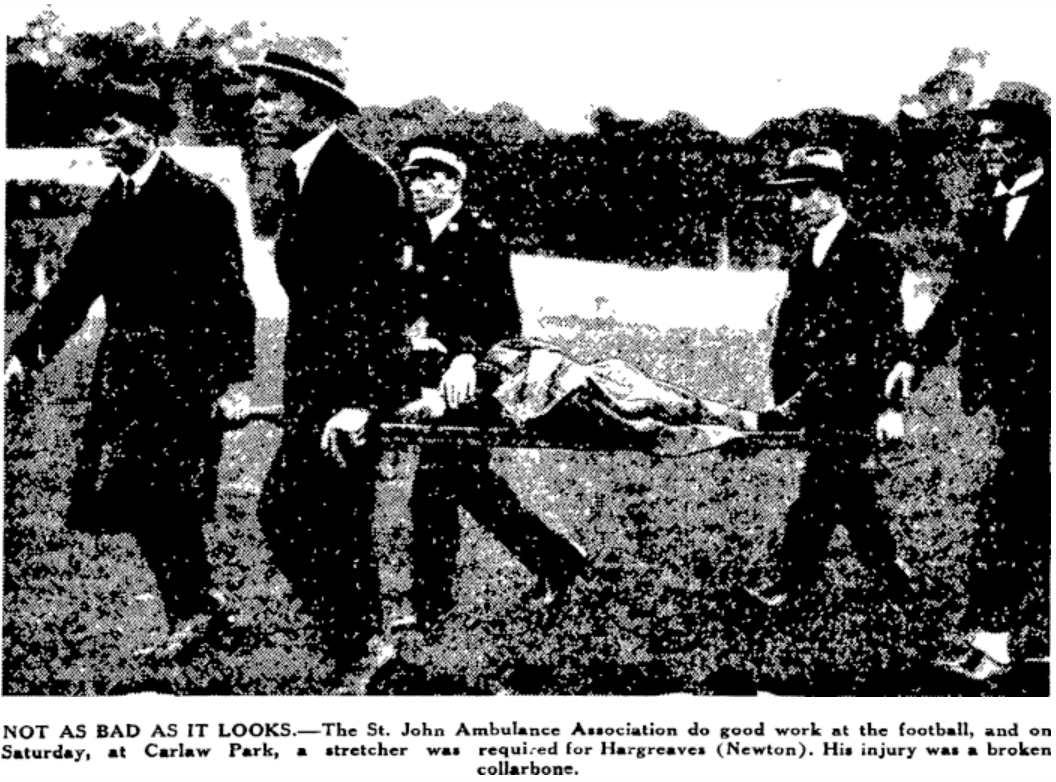
Roy Hardgrave stretchered off in Newton's match with Richmond with a suspected broken collarbone.

In the match between Newton Rangers and Richmond Rovers, flying winger Roy Hardgrave was thought to have broken his collarbone and was stretchered from the field. However it was later found that he had just received a kick to the shoulder after trying to stop a Richmond forward rush. Hardgrave was in his third season for Newton and in 1928 he would gain selection to the New Zealand side against England. His performances would gain the attention of the English management and in 1929 he signed with St Helens, going on to play 214 matches for them, scoring 174 tries. He returned to New Zealand briefly in 1934 but then went back to England, signing for York. In 1938 he returned once more and joined the young Mount Albert club, playing 22 games and scoring 19 tries as a 32 year old. In the same round Lou Brown scored 2 tries in City's 15-0 win over Marist. Brown was New Zealand's most prolific try scorer in its formative decades scoring around 300 tries in approximately 400 games in New Zealand, England, and France.

15 May	City	15–0	Marist	Carlaw Park 1
3:00	Try: Lou Brown 2, J Lewis, C Mitchell, George Wade			Attendance: 9,000; Referee: A Taylor

15 May	Newton	43–25	Richmond	Carlaw Park 2
3:00	Try: M Herewini, Roy Hardgrave, M Little 2, Arthur Mansill, George Morman 3, Alan Clarke; Con: M Herewini, Arthur Mansill 5, Clarrie Polson; Pen: M Herewini		Try: Jim Parkes, Avery, Bill Davis, Stan Prentice, Donald; Con: Jim Parkes 3 Pen: Jim Parkes 2	Attendance: 9,000; Referee: Hill

15 May	Devonport	6–13	Grafton	Devonport Domain
3:00	Try: Clinton Boryer, Len Scott		Try: Bert Avery, Bill Te Whata, W Smith; Con: Craddock Dufty 2	Referee: Les Bull

==== Round 5 ====
The round 5 matches were postponed after a huge amount of rain fell on Thursday evening prior to the scheduled games. A large amount of the city was flooded and a blocked drain in the domain saw a large amount of water flood on to Carlaw Park. The ARL decided to cancel all senior games on the Friday, and then with more bad weather occurring on the Saturday extended the cancellations to all grades. When the matches eventually took place a week later Lou Brown tore a ligament in his foot in his match with Grafton and missed several matches but recovered in time to gain selection for the New Zealand team to tour England. His twin brother Ernest Brown was also injured in the match which also saw George Raynor ordered off. Marist winger, Cooke broke his collarbone in their match with Newton.

29 May	Ponsonby	10–3	Richmond	Carlaw Park 1
3:00	Try: Leonard Riley, Lou Hutt; Con: Tim Peckham 2		Try: Ken Hyland	Attendance: 5,000; Referee: Les Bull

29 May	City	33–10	Grafton	Carlaw Park 2
3:00	Try: Ben Davidson, George Wade 3, Billy Ghent 3, Lou Brown 2 Con: Maurice Wetherill, Nelson Bass, Unknown x 1		Try: W Smith, Penalty Try; Con: Craddock Dufty; Pen: Craddock Dufty	Attendance: 5,000; Referee: William Mincham

29 May	Marist	12–9	Newton	Auckland Domain 2
3:00	Try: Hanson, Jim O'Brien; Con: Arthur Singe 2 Pen: Arthur Singe		Try: Bert Little; Con: Arthur Mansill; Pen: Arthur Mansill 2	Referee: Percy Rogers

==== Round 6 ====
Frank Delgrosso left the field with a bad cut over his eye against Marist which required stitches and missed some game. Maurice Wetherill missed City's match as he was sitting a plumbers exam, while Lou Brown and Ernest Brown were out injured. Meanwhile Devonport welcomed back Stan Webb, Neville St George, Lyall Stewart, and Eric (Bill) Cleaver who had all been injured earlier in the season.

5 June	Marist	13–8	Ponsonby	Carlaw Park 1
3:00	Try: Jack Kirwan 2, Arthur Singe; Con: Arthur Singe 2		Try: Lou Hutt, Len Ward; Con: Tim Peckham	Referee: William Mincham

5 June	Devonport	14–5	City	Carlaw Park 1
1:30	Try: Len Scott 2, Lyall Stewart, Harry Douglas; Con: Neville St George		Try: William McLaughlin; Pen: Nelson Bass	Referee: Les Bull

5 June	Newton	26–10	Grafton	Carlaw Park 2
3:00	Try: Alan Clarke 3, Arthur Mansill, Wally Somers, Clarrie Polson; Con: Arthur Mansill 4		Try: Jones 2 Pen: E Lucas 2	Referee: McGowatt

==== Round 7 ====
Hec Brisbane made return from a broken collarbone for Marist's match with Richmond. Roy Hardgrave of Newton also returned from his shoulder injury suffered in round 4. Len Scott scored five tries for Devonport in their 40-14 win over Newton.

12 June	Marist	24–10	Richmond	Carlaw Park 1
2:45	Try: Jim Stormont, Jack Kirwan, F Hanson, Jim O'Brien, Bob Crewther 2 Con: Arthur Singe 3		Try: Stan Prentice, Frederick Bass; Con: Mick Carroll; Pen: Mick Carroll	Referee: L Taylor

12 June	Ponsonby	19–14	Grafton	Carlaw Park 2
2:45	Try: Hector Cole 2, H Goodley 2, Ivan Littlewood; Con: Hector Cole, Tim Peckham		Try: Craddock Dufty, W Smith; Con: Craddock Dufty 2 Pen: Craddock Dufty; Drop: George Rayner	Referee: Les Bull

12 June	Devonport	40–14	Newton	Devonport Domain
3:00	Try: Horace Dixon, Len Scott 5, Ernest Ruby, Bert Laing, Alf Scott 2 Con: Bert Laing 3, Alf Scott 2		Try: Bert Little, Alan Clarke, G Rhodes, George Morman (Penalty Try); Pen: Arthur Mansill	Referee: William Mincham

==== Round 8 ====
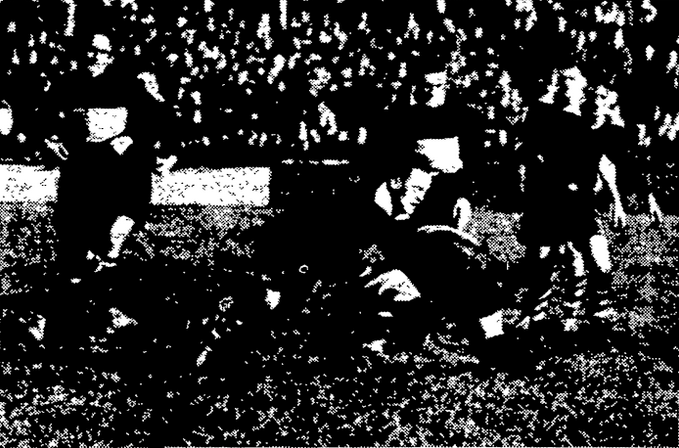
George Gardiner on the left, Stan Webb making a tackle, with Leonard Riley close behind and Allan Seagar on the right.

The scoring between Ponsonby and Devonport was dominated by New Zealand internationals from the past, present and future. Ivan Littlewood scored for Ponsonby along with Frank Delgrosso. Tim Peckham was their third try scorer, with Leonard Riley gaining their other try. Riley did not represent New Zealand but his younger brother Brian Riley did in 1932. For Devonport New Zealand representatives Lyall Stewart, Len Scott, and Jim O'Brien scored tries, with Bert Laing converting 2. In Richmond's game with Grafton Jim Parkes (Richmond) was tripped by George Rayner as he ran down the side line and referee Percy Rogers sent him off.

19 June	Ponsonby	19–16	Devonport	Carlaw Park 1
2:45	Try: Ivan Littlewood, Frank Delgrosso, Tim Peckham, Leonard Riley 2 Con: Frank Delgrosso 2		Try: Lyall Stewart, Len Scott 2, Jim O'Brien; Con: Bert Laing 2	Attendance: 6,500; Referee: Les Bull

19 June	City	34–20	Newton	Carlaw Park 2
2:45	Try: Alf Townsend 2, George Wade 4, Harry Hawkes, Billy Ghent; Con: Maurice Wetherill 5		Try: Roy Hardgrave 2, Clarrie Polson, M Brown; Con: Arthur Mansill 3 Pen: Arthur Mansill	Attendance: 6,500; Referee: William Mincham

19 June	Grafton	11–10	Richmond	Carlaw Park 1
1:30	Try: Ernie Herring; Con: Craddock Dufty; Pen: Craddock Dufty 3		Try: Frederick Bass, W Donald; Con: Jim Parkes; Pen: Jim Parkes	Referee: Percy Rogers

==== Round 9 ====
Ponsonby and City met for the 50th time in the senior team history. Following the 11-8 win to City the record stood at 28 wins to them, 20 to Ponsonby, and 2 draws. Marist hooker Jim Johnson was ordered off early in the second half of their match against Grafton.

17 July	Marist	19–2	Grafton	Carlaw Park 1
1:30	Try: Bernard Sweeney, Hudson, Jim O'Brien, F Hanson, Jack Kirwan; Con: Charles Gregory, Bob Crewther		Pen: George Rayner	Referee: Vic Simpson

17 July	City	11–8	Ponsonby	Carlaw Park 1
2:45	Try: George Wade 2, Billy Ghent; Pen: Maurice Wetherill		Try: George Gardiner, H Goodley; Con: Frank Delgrosso	Referee: H Taylor

17 July	Devonport	24–0	Richmond	Carlaw Park 2
2:45	Try: Jim O'Brien, Horace Dixon, Len Scott, Stanley Rule 2, Ken Scott; Con: Bert Laing, Allan Seagar 2			Referee: Les Bull

==== Round 10 ====
Clarrie Polson, Newton's New Zealand representative was leaving at this point in the season to go and live in Wellington. Eric Grey scored a try and kicked a drop goal in their win over Newton. He had retired in 1924 but returned to the Ponsonby side a week prior in round 9.

24 July	Devonport	31–13	Marist	Carlaw Park 1
2:45	Try: Stanley Rule, Len Scott, Ernest Ruby 2, Allan Seagar, Bert Laing, Horace Dixon; Con: Alf Scott 5		Try: Mannix, Jim Johnson, Robert Crewther; Con: Charles Gregory 2	Attendance: 5,000; Referee: Les Bull

24 July	Ponsonby	42–15	Newton	Carlaw Park 2
2:45	Try: Frank Delgrosso 3, H Goodley, Bert Payne 2, George Gardiner, R Allen, Eric Grey, Victor Fagan; Con: Frank Delgrosso, George Gardiner 2 Pen: George Gardiner 2 Drop: Eric Grey		Try: M Little, Charles Hand, Penalty Try; Con: Charles Hand 2 Pen: Charles Hand	Attendance: 5,000; Referee: Percy Rogers

24 July	City	10–6	Richmond	Victoria Park
3:00	Try: Joe Lewis, Billy Ghent; Con: Maurice Wetherill; Pen: Maurice Wetherill		Try: Frederick Bass, Ken Hyland	Referee: T Hill

==== Round 11 ====
Several teams were considerably weakened by the absence of their New Zealand representatives who had departed for their tour of England. L Taylor transferred from the Whitiora rugby league club in Hamilton and scored a try and kicked 6 goals on debut for Richmond and went on to become the second highest point scorer in senior competition from just 6 games.

14 August	City	22–13	Marist	Carlaw Park 1
3:00	Try: George Wade 3, Maurice Wetherill 2, Joe Lewis; Con: Maurice Wetherill 2		Try: Bernard Sweeney 2, William Noble; Con: Pickering; Pen: Pickering	Referee: William Mincham

14 August	Richmond	30–5	Newton	Carlaw Park 2
3:00	Try: L Taylor, Stan Prentice 3, Jack Redwood, Frederick Bass; Con: L Taylor 3 Pen: L Taylor 3		Try: Bert Little; Pen: M Herewini	Referee: H Taylor

14 August	Devonport	42–8	Grafton	Devonport Domain
3:00	Try: Lyall Stewart 2, J Hemingway 2, Len Scott, Alf Scott, Ernest Ruby, Julius Laing, Bill Cleaver, Jim O'Brien; Con: Alf Scott 4, Allan Seagar, Rykers		Try: Charles Webb, Nicholas Moros; Pen: E Lucas	Referee: Les Bull

==== Round 12 ====
Newton only had 10 players for the entirety of their match with Marist but still made a game of it only losing 15–11. They played with just 3 forwards for the duration and managed to lead 11-10 at halftime through 2 tries to Bert Little at centre, and another to M Herewini. Marist were "lethargic" before doing enough in the second half to win the game.

21 August	Ponsonby	20–11	Richmond	Carlaw Park 1
3:00	Try: Ivan Littlewood, Leonard Riley, Victor Fagan, Lou Hutt; Con: Tim Peckham 3 Pen: Eric Grey		Try: Frederick Bass; Pen: L Taylor 3 Drop: L Taylor	Referee: H Taylor

21 August	City	47–18	Grafton	Carlaw Park 2
3:00	Try: Maurice Wetherill, George Wade 2, Nelson Bass 2, Billy Ghent 3, Joe Lewis, Harry Hawkes 2 Con: Maurice Wetherill 3, Joe Lewis, Ernest Brown; Pen: Maurice Wetherill 2		Try: Nicholas Moros, T Pitman, Penalty Try, R Callaghan; Con: T Heard, E Lucas 2	Referee: G McGowatt

21 August	Marist	15–11	Newton	Carlaw Park 2
1:45	Try: Jim O'Brien, Bernard Sweeney, Robert Crewther; Con: Jim O'Brien 3		Try: Grover, Bert Little 2 Con: M Herewini	Referee: Bert Emirali

==== Round 13 ====
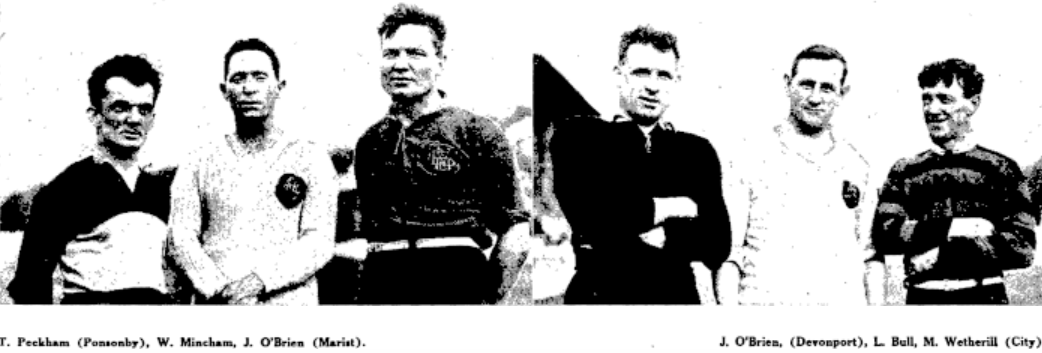
The captains and referees (Tim Peckham, Jim O'Brien (Marist), Jim O'Brien (Devonport), Maurice Wetherill, and referees William Mincham and Les Bull)

The Newton v Grafton game saw 25 points scored but by just two players. For Newton Alan Clarke scored three tries and kicked two conversions while for Grafton F Jones scored two tries, and kicked one conversion and two penalties.

4 September	City	14–9	Devonport	Carlaw Park 1
3:00	Try: Billy Ghent, Ernie Mackie; Con: Maurice Wetherill 2 Pen: Maurice Wetherill 2		Try: J Hemingway, Horace Dixon, K Scott	Referee: Les Bull

4 September	Ponsonby	10–8	Marist	Carlaw Park 2
3:00	Try: R Allen, Leonard Riley; Con: Eric Grey; Pen: Eric Grey		Try: Moore, Horace Hansen; Con: Pickering	Referee: William Mincham

4 September	Newton	13–12	Grafton	Auckland Domain
3:00	Try: Alan Clarke 3 Con: Alan Clarke 2		Try: F Jones 2 Con: F Jones; Pen: F Jones 2	Referee: H Taylor

==== Final ====
11 September	Ponsonby	13–8	City	Carlaw Park
3:00	Try: Kenneth Peckham, Sydney Usher, Len Ward; Con: Tim Peckham; Pen: Eric Grey		Try: Selby Crewther, Nelson Bass; Con: Maurice Wetherill	Attendance: 10,000; Referee: William Mincham

== Roope Rooster knockout competition ==
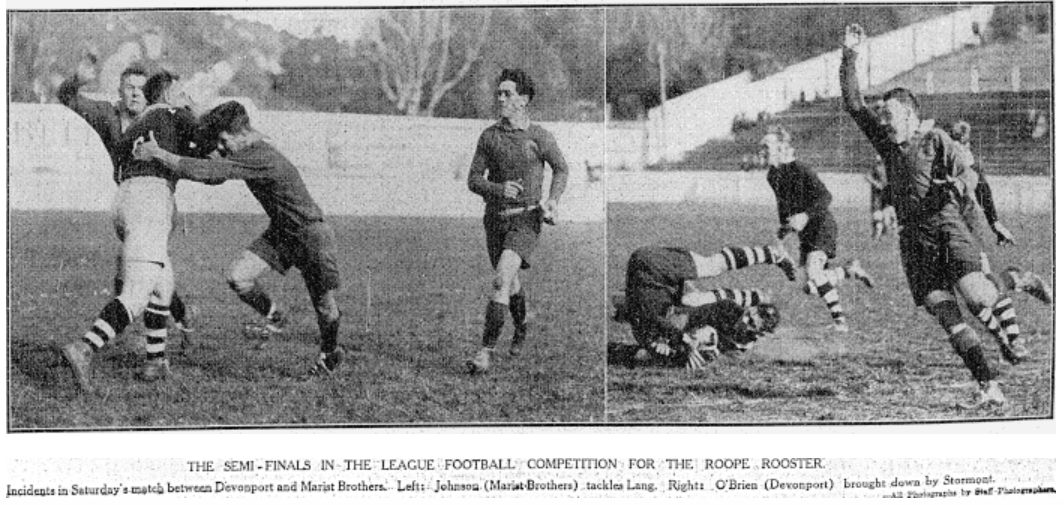
Devonport v Marist in the Roope Rooster semi final on 25 September at Carlaw Park.

Richmond won the Roope Rooster for the first time with a 16–15 win over Devonport in the final. This was their first major trophy.

=== Round 1 ===
18 September	Ponsonby	12–2	City	Carlaw Park 1
3:00	Try: Wilfred McNeil, H Goodley, Ivan Littlewood, Len Ward		Pen: Maurice Wetherill	Referee: Les Bull

18 September	Marist	29–10	Grafton	Carlaw Park 2
3:00	Try: Robert Crewther 2, Bulcraig, Bernard Sweeney, Horace Hanson, Jim O'Brien, Jim Johnson; Con: Pickering 3, Jim O'Brien		Try: Wilson, C Timmins; Con: T Heard; Pen: T Heard	Referee: William Mincham

18 September	Richmond	25–15	Newton	Carlaw Park 1
1:30	Try: L Taylor 3, W Donald, Devon; Con: L Taylor 2 Pen: L Taylor 3		Try: Cyril Irvine, George Morman, Bert Little; Con: Alan Clarke; Pen: Alan Clarke 2	Referee: Percy Rogers

=== Semi-finals ===
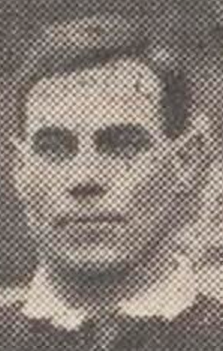
Bert Laing

Richmond recorded their first ever 1st grade win over Ponsonby. The teams had met 11 times previously stretching back to 1922 with Ponsonby winning each time. Wilfred McNeil of the Ponsonby side broke a rib and received treatment at Auckland Hospital before being discharged. While W. Donald of the Richmond side also went to hospital after suffering a broken collarbone and concussion. He was also able to go home after treatment. Jim Stormont (Marist) was sent off by referee Les Bull after arguing with him. They led 7-3 at the time but went on to lose to Devonport 28 to 11. For the winners Bert Laing scored two tries and kicked four goals.

25 September	Richmond	13–12	Ponsonby	Carlaw Park 1
3:00	Try: Stan Prentice, Avery, Unknown x 1 Con: Mick Carroll; Pen: L Taylor		Try: Leonard Riley, H Goodley; Con: Tim Peckham; Pen: Eric Grey; Drop: Eric Grey	Referee: McGowatt

25 September	Devonport	28–11	Marist	Carlaw Park 2
3:00	Try: Len Scott, Horace Dixon, Bert Laing 2, Ernest Ruby, J Hemingway; Con: Bert Laing 3, Alf Scott; Pen: Bert Laing		Try: Bernard Sweeney; Pen: Pickering	Referee: Les Bull

=== Final ===
Jack Redwood, the Richmond hooker, who had been outperforming Neville St George in the scrums had to be carried off the field early in the second half. Richmond managed to hold on to win though through "resolute" tackling and a lack of finishing by Devonport.

16 October	Richmond	16–15	Devonport	Carlaw Park 1
3:00	Try: Stan Prentice, L Taylor 2, Bill Davis; Con: L Taylor, Mick Carroll		Try: Ernest Ruby, Len Scott, Jim O'Brien; Con: Bert Laing 2 Pen: Bert Laing	Attendance: 4,000; Referee: Les Bull

== Stormont Shield ==
Ponsonby won the Stormont Shield again after winning it in the previous season which was the first year it had been contested after the passing of Bill Stormont months earlier who it was named in honour of.

23 October	Ponsonby	15–5	Richmond	Carlaw Park 1
3:00	Try: Bert Payne, Tim Peckham, Dooley Moore; Con: Tim Peckham 3		Try: Bill Davis; Con: L Taylor	Attendance: 5,000; Referee: Les Bull

== Top try scorers and point scorers (senior grade, Roope Rooster and Stormont Memorial Shield) ==
The scoring is from all matches which were technically open to all sides.

Top try scorers
Rk	Player	Team	Gms	Tries
1=	Len Scott	Devonport	12	17
1=	George Wade	City	14	17
3	Leonard Riley	Ponsonby	14	12
4=	Billy Ghent	City	14	11
4=	Bert Little	Newton	12	11
6	Alan Clarke	Newton	10	9
7=	Lou Brown	City	6	8
7=	Bernard Sweeney	Marist	10	8
7=	Ivan Littlewood	Ponsonby	16	8
10=	Jim O'Brien	Marist	13	7
10=	Stan Prentice	Richmond	15	7

Top point scorers
Rk	Player	Team	G	T	C	P	M	Pts
1	Maurice Wetherill	City	13	6	16	6	0	62
2	L Taylor	Richmond	6	6	7	10	1	54
3	Frank Delgrosso	Ponsonby	8	5	17	2	0	53
4=	George Wade	City	14	17	0	0	0	51
4=	Len Scott	Devonport	12	17	0	0	0	51
6=	Arthur Mansill	Newton	7	3	15	4	0	47
6=	Tim Peckham	Ponsonby	14	5	16	0	0	47
8	Arthur Singe	Marist	7	3	12	6	0	45
9	Alf Scott	Devonport	10	4	15	1	0	44
10=	Bert Laing	Devonport	8	4	11	2	0	38
10=	Leonard Riley	Ponsonby	14	12	1	0	0	38

== B Division standings and results ==
=== B Division standings ===
Team	Pld	W	D	L	F	A	Pts
Northcote & Birkenhead Ramblers	14	10	1	3	166	139	21
Kingsland Rovers	14	9	0	5	177	101	18
Ellerslie United	14	7	2	5	103	98	16
Māngere United	14	7	1	6	134	113	15
Otahuhu Rovers	14	4	2	8	68	124	10
Parnell	14	3	0	12	76	149	6

=== B Division results ===
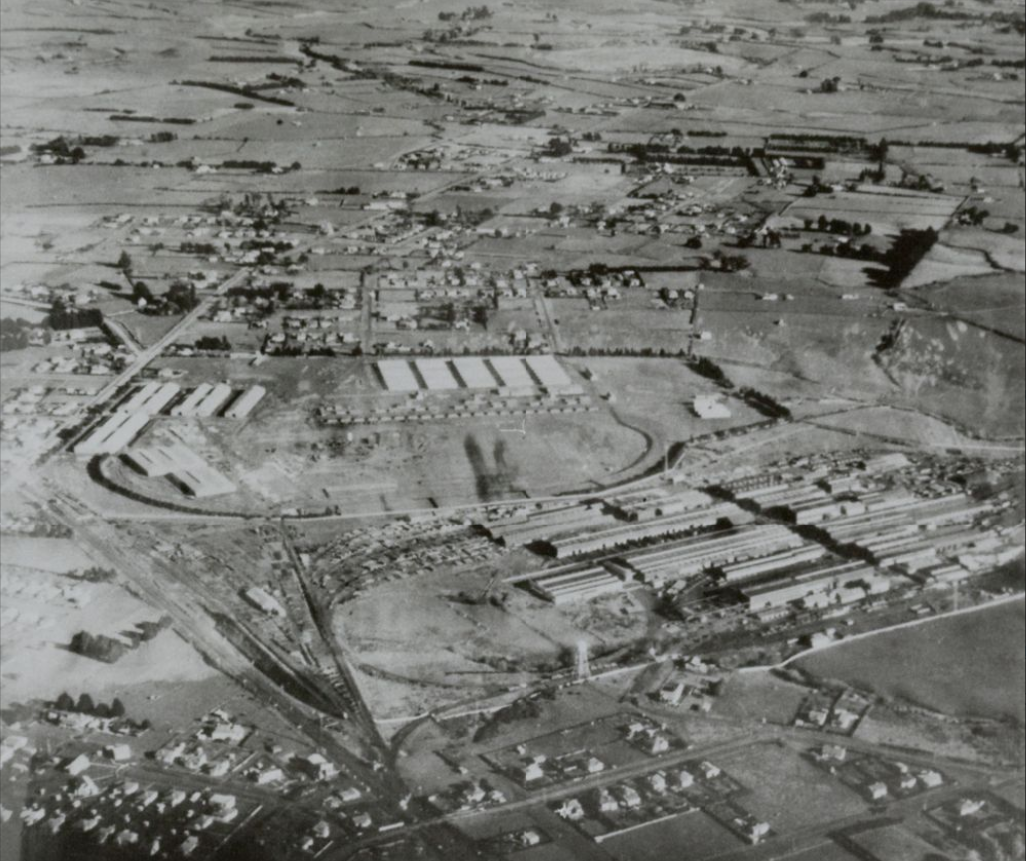
Otahuhu in 1944 showing the Otahuhu Trotting Ground in the centre, to the south of the Otahuhu Railway Workshops. The US Military camp (Camp Euart) was on the trotting ground in this photo.

At the start of the season Auckland Rugby League secured the use of part of the Otahuhu Trotting Ground to play games at. Primarily Otahuhu played their matches there, both the B grade side and their lower grade teams. Auckland Rugby League had the use of the ground until around 1930 with Auckland Rugby using the grounds for a handful of years before it was no longer used by sports teams.

1926 First Grade Results
	Date		Score		Score	Venue
Round 1	24 April	Ellerslie	3	Parnell	2	Auckland Domain
–	24 April	Mangere	37	Northcote	8	Victoria Park
–	24 April	Kingsland	5	Otahuhu	3	Otahuhu
Round 2	1 May	Otahuhu	6	Parnell	5	Otahuhu
–	1 May	Mangere	16	Kingsland	13	Auckland Domain
–	1 May	Northcote	7	Ellerslie	6	Auckland Domain
Round 3	8 May	Otahuhu	8	Ellerslie	8	Otahuhu
–	8 May	Northcote	10	Kingsland	7	Victoria Park
–	8 May	Mangere	13	Parnell	3	Mangere
Round 4	15 May	Ellerslie	5	Kingsland	0	Ellerslie Reserve
–	15 May	Northcote	15	Parnell	11	Victoria Park
–	15 May	Mangere	0	Otahuhu	10	Mangere
Round 5	31 May	Ellerslie	8	Mangere	0	Carlaw Park # 1
–	31 May	Otahuhu	5	Northcote	5	Victoria Park
–	31 May	Kingsland	24	Parnell	8	Auckland Domain
Round 6	5 June	Kingsland	18	Otahuhu	3	Victoria Park
–	5 June	Mangere	15	Northcote	14	Auckland Domain
–	5 June	Ellerslie	WBD	Parnell	LBD	Auckland Domain
Round 7	12 June	Mangere	7	Kingsland	8	Mangere
–	12 June	Northcote	8	Ellerslie	5	Ellerslie Reserve
–	12 June	Parnell	10	Otahuhu	3	Carlaw Park # 1
Round 8	19 June	Ellerslie	11	Otahuhu	0	Auckland Domain
–	19 June	Mangere	14	Parnell	5	Mangere Trotting Ground
–	19 June	Kingsland	18	Northcote	2	Victoria Park
Round 9	17 July	Ellerslie	11	Kingsland	10	Auckland Domain # 1, 3pm
–	17 July	Otahuhu	0	Mangere	6	Otahuhu, 3pm
–	17 July	Northcote	21	Parnell	5	Victoria Park, 3pm
Round 10	24 July	Ellerslie	13	Mangere	13	Ellerslie Reserve
–	24 July	Kingsland	11	Parnell	8	Carlaw Park # 2, 2.30 pm
–	24 July	Northcote	12	Otahuhu	4	Carlaw Park # 1, 1.30 pm
Round 11	14 Aug	Ellerslie	10	Parnell	6	Carlaw Park # 1
–	14 Aug	Kingsland	24	Otahuhu	0	Auckland Domain
–	14 Aug	Northcote	10	Mangere	5	Victoria Park
Round 12	21 Aug	Northcote	16	Ellerslie	11	Ellerslie Reserve
–	21 Aug	Kingsland	21	Mangere	8	Auckland Domain
–	21 Aug	Parnell	10	Otahuhu	9	Victoria Park
Round 13	4 Sep	Northcote	18	Kingsland	7	Carlaw Park #1, 1.45 pm
–	4 Sep	Otahuhu	17	Ellerslie	10	Ellerslie Reserve, 3pm
–	4 Sep	Parnell	WBD	Mangere	LBD	Auckland Domain # 6, 3pm
Round 14	11 Sep	Northcote	20	Parnell	3	Carlaw Park # 2
–	11 Sep	Kingsland	11	Ellerslie	2	Carlaw Park # 1, 1.30 pm
–	11 Sep	Otahuhu	WBD	Mangere	LBD	Otahuhu Trotting Grounds

In Round 6 Parnell defaulted to Ellerslie with the club secretary saying "the fact that five men are on the injured list and that others have had to leave town to seek work in the country were the chief factors".

=== Stallard Cup knockout competition ===
This was the second year that the B Division knockout competition had been competed for.

1926 Stallard Cup results
	Date		Score		Score	Venue
Round 1	18 Sep	Mangere	17	Ellerslie	16	Mangere Black Bridge, 3pm
–	18 Sep	Parnell	13	Northcote	13	Devonport, 3pm
Round 1	25 Sep	Kingsland	13	Northcote	12	Carlaw Park # 2, 1.30 pm
Round 1	25 Sep	Otahuhu	8	Mangere	5	Otahuhu Reserve, 3pm
Semi-final	9 Oct	Parnell	11	Otahuhu	3	Carlaw Park # 2, 3pm
Final	16 Oct	Kingsland	25	Parnell	13	Carlaw Park # 1

== Other club matches and lower grades ==
=== Lower grade competitions ===
==== Second grade ====
Devonport beat City in the final on 18 September by 6 points to 3. Grafton won the knockout final when they beat Point Chevalier. They had defeated Kingsland and Ponsonby in the semi-finals respectively. Marist withdrew after 2 rounds while Newton withdrew after 10 rounds, Otahuhu after 13 rounds, and Mangere after 15. A large number of results were not reported so the standings are incomplete.

Team	Pld	W	D	L	B	F	A	Pts
Devonport United	16	4	1	1	1	93	35	9
Point Chevalier	15	7	1	1	3	100	37	15
Ponsonby United	15	6	1	3	3	96	45	13
City Rovers	16	4	1	2	0	98	21	9
Grafton Athletic	15	3	0	1	1	49	35	6
Richmond Rovers	15	1	0	8	3	55	136	2
Kingsland Rovers	15	0	0	3	2	8	52	0
Māngere United	11	0	0	1	4	0	17	0
Otahuhu Rovers	12	0	0	1	1	0	21	0
Newton Rangers	8	0	0	3	2	5	105	0
Marist Old Boys	2	0	0	0	0	0	0	0

==== Third grade open ====
Grafton Athletic won the championship and had a season record of 19 wins and 1 loss, for 371, against 63 including their 2 knockout games where they defeated United Suburbs in the semi-final and Devonport United in the final. Ellerslie withdrew after 7 rounds. The majority of match scores were not reported in the newspapers so the standings are incomplete.

Team	Pld	W	D	L	B	F	A	Pts
Grafton Athletic	17	16	0	1	2	371	63	32
Ponsonby United	16	4	0	2	2	55	23	8
United Suburbs	15	3	0	3	2	37	24	6
Devonport United	16	2	0	4	1	32	63	4
New Lynn	14	1	0	1	3	21	29	2
Northcote & Birkenhead Ramblers	13	0	0	4	4	3	27	0
Māngere United	13	0	0	4	4	3	62	0
Glen Eden Rovers	15	0	0	5	2	2	68	0
Ellerslie United	5	0	0	1	2	0	4	0

==== Third grade intermediate ====
Richmond had a 10 win, 2 loss record for the season and also won the knockout competition. They scored 127 points and conceded 57. They defeated Devonport in the knockout final after beating Newton 5-0 in the semi-finals. Devonport had beaten Glen Eden 21-4 in the other semi final. United Suburbs withdrew after 2 rounds while Parnell withdrew after 9 rounds. Curiously Glen Eden joined the competition in the 5th round, then Mangere joined in the 9th round, while a Ponsonby side was also listed in the fixtures for the 9th round but no other rounds. Very few results were reported though it was mentioned that Richmond had won 10 matches and lost 2, scoring 127 and conceding 57 though it is unknown if this also included their knockout matches.

Team	Pld	W	D	L	B	F	A	Pts
Richmond Rovers	11	8	1	2	1	122	57	17
Parnell	8	3	0	2	1	64	48	6
Newton Rangers	9	1	1	1	3	11	16	3
Devonport United	11	1	0	3	0	35	40	2
Kingsland Rovers	11	1	0	1	1	28	29	2
Glen Eden Rovers	7	0	0	1	1	0	23	0
Māngere United	3	0	0	0	0	0	0	0
United Suburbs	2	0	0	0	0	0	0	0

==== Fourth grade ====
Parnell won the championship. Richmond won the knockout competition defeating Grafton 6-3 in the final on 23 October. Richmond had beaten Parnell in one semi final while Grafton defeated City in the other. Marist withdrew from the competition after 2 rounds, New Lynn after 3 rounds, Newton after 9 rounds, and Otahuhu after 13. A significant number of results were not reported however 13 of Parnell's 14 results were reported. On 4 September in the match between Ellerslie and Richmond the referee ordered the entire Ellerslie team off at halftime due to verbal abuse while they were leading 8-5. The match was awarded to Richmond.

Team	Pld	W	D	L	B	F	A	Pts
Parnell	14	12	1	1	4	165	22	25
Ponsonby United	15	5	1	2	3	69	52	11
Grafton Athletic	16	3	1	1	2	55	7	7
Richmond Rovers	16	3	1	3	2	69	47	7
Ellerslie United	14	2	0	6	4	45	65	4
City Rovers	14	1	0	4	4	12	35	2
Point Chevalier	15	1	0	6	3	31	105	2
Newton Rangers	8	1	0	3	1	0	65	0
Otahuhu Rovers	12	0	0	3	1	8	56	0
New Lynn	3	0	0	0	0	0	0	0
Marist Old Boys	2	0	0	1	0	0	0	0

==== Fifth grade ====
Richmond won the competition and they also won the knockout competition when they defeated Northcote in the final on 9 October. Northcote turned their season around after suffering several heavy losses and temporarily withdrawing from the championship before later rejoining and winning some matches. Grafton withdrew after 12 rounds. The majority of results were not reported. On 11 September in the final round the only match played was between Richmond and Devonport with Richmond winning 13-11. It is possible that this match was the final of the championship. All of Devonport's 3 defeats were to Richmond while they easily won their other two reported results (20-2 and 19-0 over Ponsonby and Grafton respectively).

Team	Pld	W	D	L	B	F	A	Pts
Richmond Rovers	12	5	0	0	3	79	13	10
Ellerslie United	13	5	0	1	1	100	12	10
Devonport United	15	2	0	3	0	52	25	4
Grafton Athletic	11	2	0	5	1	17	89	4
Northcote & Birkenhead Ramblers	11	2	0	3	0	21	118	4
Ponsonby United	12	1	0	5	2	36	48	2

==== Sixth grade A ====
City A won the championship. Akarana won the knockout competition when they beat City A 10-8 on 16 October.

Team	Pld	W	D	L	B	F	A	Pts
City Rovers A	13	10	0	0	3	219	25	20
Richmond Rovers	12	7	0	3	4	147	37	14
Akarana	12	7	0	3	4	108	42	14
Grafton Athletic	11	2	0	5	1	17	89	4
Otahuhu United	13	2	0	6	3	74	162	4
City Rovers B	14	2	0	10	2	43	173	4
Northcote & Birkenhead Ramblers	9	0	0	4	3	5	131	0

==== Sixth grade B ====
Richmond won the 6th grade A championship. Grafton won the knockout competition when they defeated Richmond in the final on 28 August by 8 points to 0. There were several results not reported so the standings are incomplete. The City side joined in the 3rd round which created a 5 team competition and the need for a bye each round.

Team	Pld	W	D	L	B	F	A	Pts
Richmond Rovers	10	3	1	1	1	44	32	7
Grafton Athletic	9	4	0	1	2	66	15	8
City Rovers	7	3	1	1	2	27	29	7
Akarana	7	2	0	3	4	19	41	4
Point Chevalier	9	0	0	9	2	8	47	0

==== Schoolboys competition ====
The schoolboys competition was a somewhat informal one with teams joining as the weeks went by as such the table is an indication only of how the respective teams went. It began on 25 September when schoolboys from Otahuhu beat schoolboys from Parnell 5 to 3. Grey Lynn fielded a side on 16 October and lost 6-0 to Parnell while on the same day Papatoetoe drew with Otahuhu 6-6 in their first match. Then on 23 October Newmarket fielded a team which lost to Grey Lynn 9-6 while Richmond made their debut with a 16-8 win over Papatoetoe.

Team	Pld	W	D	L	F	A	Pts
Otahuhu Schoolboys	11	9	1	1	219	9	19
Parnell Schoolboys	5	2	0	3	25	51	4
Grey Lynn Schoolboys	3	2	0	1	15	17	4
Richmond Schoolboys	2	2	0	0	29	11	4
Papatoetoe Schoolboys	2	0	1	1	14	22	1
Newmarket Schoolboys	2	0	0	2	11	15	0

=== Exhibition matches ===
==== Taupiri v Ponsonby ====
15 May	Taupiri	6-16	Ponsonby	Taupiri
3:00	Try: Allan, Davis		Try: Ivan Littlewood, Payne, Hector Cole, George Gardiner; Con: Frank Delgrosso 2

	Date		Score		Score	Venue
Exhibition match	30 Aug	Hamilton	16	Northcote	17	Hamilton
Exhibition match	9 Oct	New Lynn 3rd Grade	0	Waikato Junior Team	3	Carlaw Park # 1, 1.30 pm
Exhibition match	23 Oct	Kingsland	24	Huntly	13	Carlaw Park

== Representative season ==
=== Representative fixtures ===
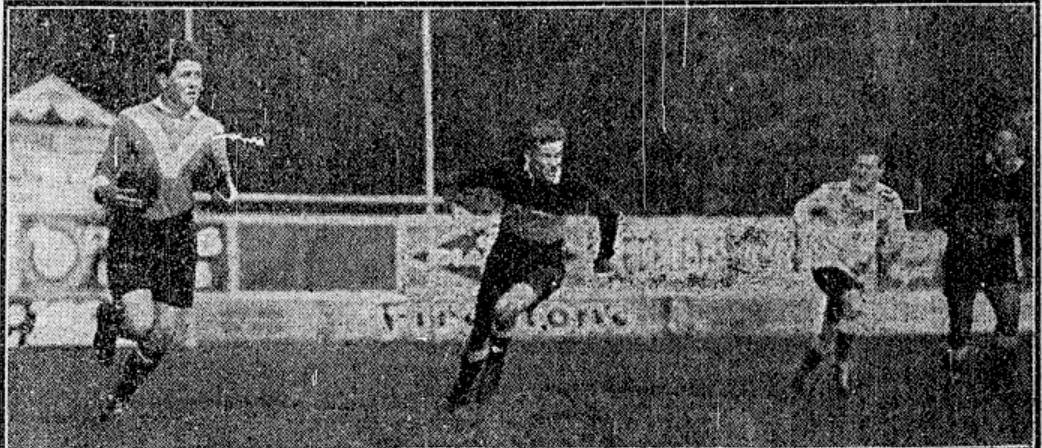
Ivan Littlewood playing for Auckland against 'The Rest' at Carlaw Park in July. He was being pursued by Saunders and Wilson-Hall.

The first representative fixture of the season was played on 26 June between Auckland and South Auckland. The match was the first trial game for the selection of the New Zealand team to tour England. With the score a lopsided 33–3 at halftime the selectors added five local Auckland players to the South Auckland team to even the match somewhat and it finished 49 to 15 in favour of the hosts.

While not principally an Auckland team playing the trial matches between North Island and South Island, and the A and B match were heavily populated by Auckland players.

The team selected to represent New Zealand featured a large number of Auckland players; Craddock Dufty (Grafton), Charles Gregory (Marist), George Gardiner (Ponsonby), Jim Parkes (Richmond), Lou Brown (City), Ben Davidson (City), Jack Kirwan (Marist), Hec Brisbane (Marist), Hector Cole (Ponsonby), Stan Webb (Devonport), Frank Delgrosso (Ponsonby), Ernie Herring (Grafton), Arthur Singe (Marist), and Bert Avery (captain) (Grafton).

Before the team departed they played Auckland at Carlaw Park and went down in a high scoring game by 52 points to 32 after fielding a slightly weakened team against a strong Auckland side.

==== Auckland v South Auckland ====
Due to the lopsided match where the halftime score was 33–3 Auckland gave several players to the South Auckland team at halftime including Arthur Mansill who kicked 3 goals for the visiting side.

26 June	Auckland	49–15	South Auckland (Waikato)	Carlaw Park 1
3:00	Try: Lou Brown, Ben Davidson, Frank Delgrosso 4, Hector Cole, Tim Peckham, Jim O'Brien 2, Bert Avery 3 Con: Craddock Dufty 2, Tim Peckham, Arthur Singe; Drop: Ben Davidson		Try: Parkes, C Gieson, Davies; Con: Arthur Mansill; Pen: Arthur Mansill	Attendance: 8,000; Referee: W Mincham

==== North Island v South Island ====
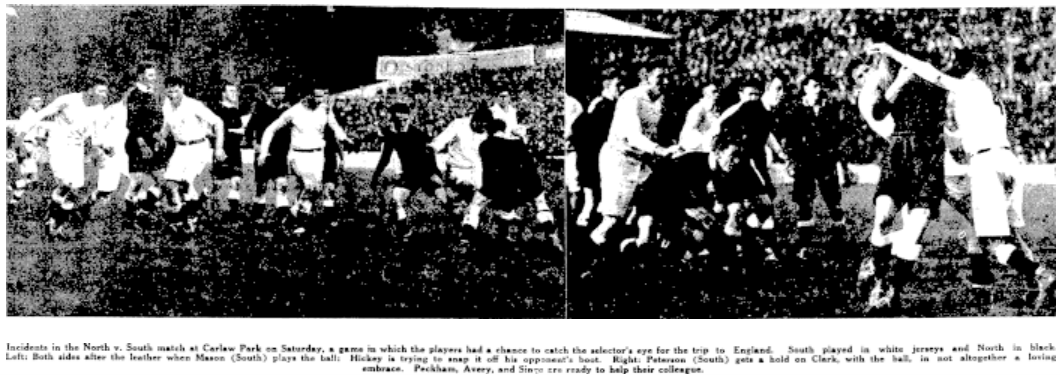

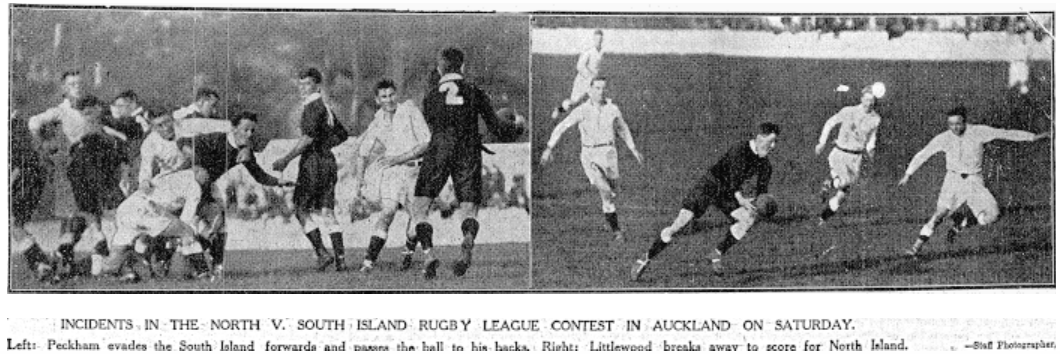

3 July	North Island	31–22	South Island	Carlaw Park 1
2:45	Try: Ivan Littlewood, Wally Desmond, Ben Davidson, Jack Kirwan, Hector Cole 2, Bert Avery; Con: Craddock Dufty 5		Try: G Brittenden, T Callentire, Jack Wright, Len Mason; Con: Frank Henry, Neil Mouat; Pen: Frank Henry, Neil Mouat 2	Attendance: 18,000; Referee: Les Bull

==== A Team v B Team (NZ trial) ====
3 July	A Team	16–25	B Team	Carlaw Park
1:15	Try: Lou Brown 3, Leonard Riley; Con: Frank Delgrosso 2		Try: Jim Parkes 3, Nelson Bass 2 Con: Arthur Mansill 4 Pen: Arthur Mansill	Attendance: 18,000; Referee: William Mincham

==== Auckland v The Rest (of NZ) ====
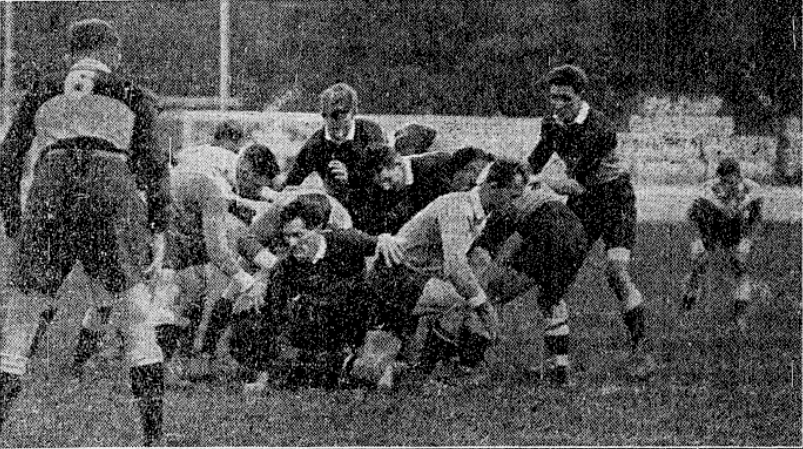

Auckland played a midweek match with a rest of New Zealand side with 4,000 in attendance.

7 July	Auckland	21–28	The Rest	Carlaw Park 1
3:00	Try: Ivan Littlewood, Stan Webb, J Lewis, Frank Delgrosso 2 Con: Arthur Mansill 3		Try: Sanders 3, Wally Desmond, Wilson Hall, Neil Mouat; Con: Neil Mouat 4 Pen: Neil Mouat	Attendance: 4,000; Referee: Les Bull

==== Probables v Possibles (NZ trial) ====
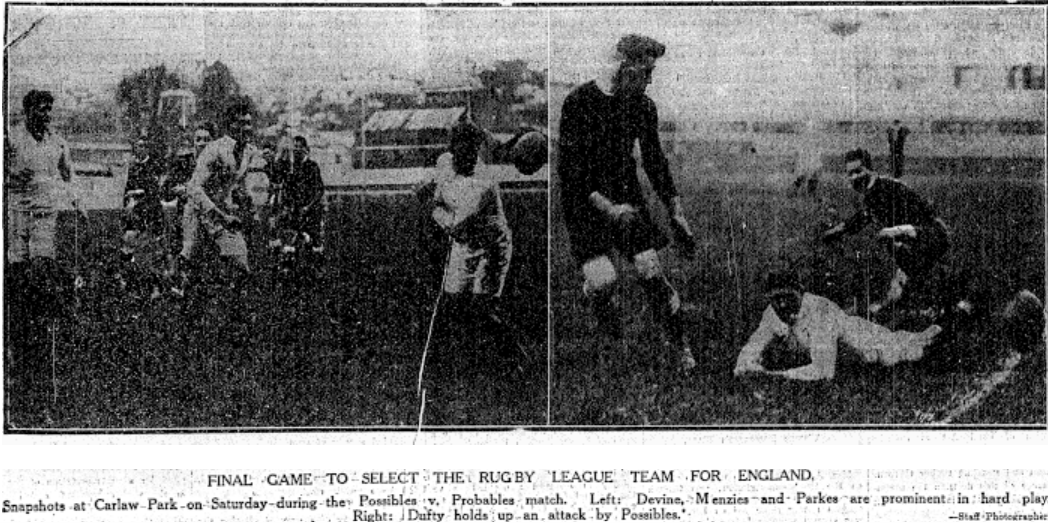

10 July	Probables	15–32	Possibles	Carlaw Park 1
2:45	Try: Wally Desmond 2, Stan Webb (obstruction try); Con: Craddock Dufty 3		Try: P Hickey, Hec Brisbane 2, Neil Mouat, Bill Devine 2, Joe Menzies, J Tallentire; Con: Neil Mouat 4	Attendance: 10,000; Referee: Les Bull

==== A Team v B Team (NZ trial) ====
10 July	A Team	28–30	B Team	Carlaw Park 1
1:15	Try: Wilson (jnr) 2, Jim O'Brien, Alan Clarke, W Little 2 Con: Arthur Mansill 5		Try: George Wade 2, Claude List, Alf Townsend, Horace Dixon, C 'Dooley' Moore; Con: George Gardiner 6	Attendance: 10,000; Referee: Percy Rogers

==== Auckland v New Zealand ====
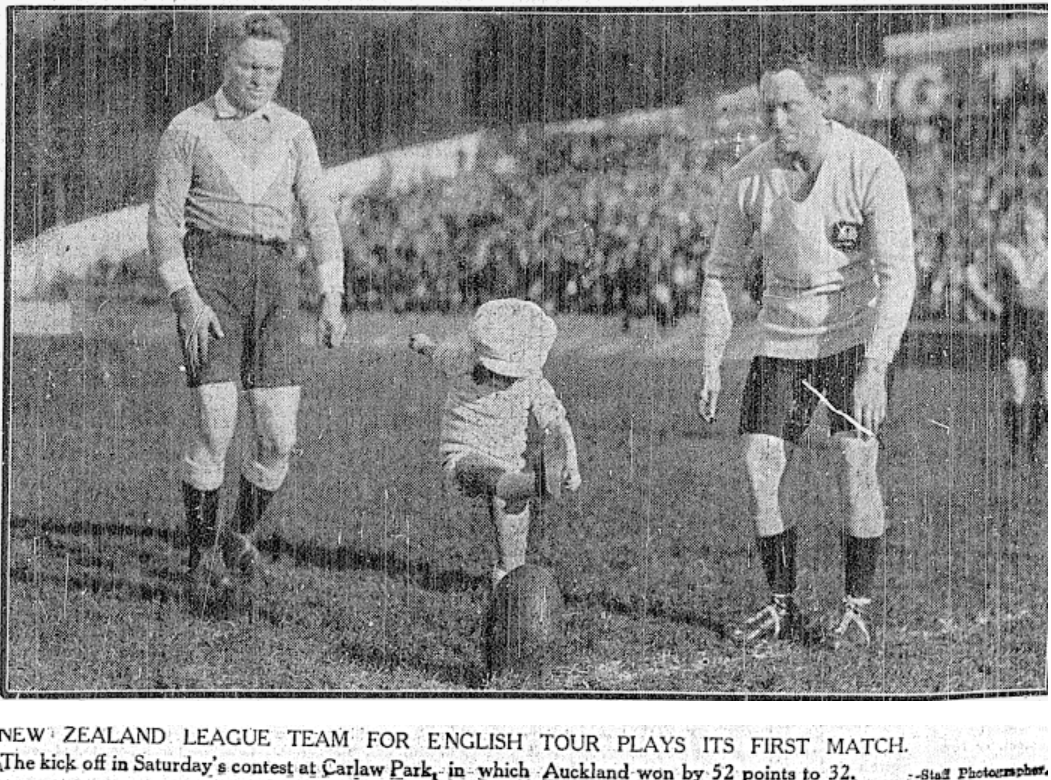

31 July	Auckland	52–32	New Zealand	Carlaw Park 1
3:00	Try: Claude List, George Wade, Maurice Wetherill 3, Stan Prentice, Tim Peckham, Alf Scott, Horace Dixon 2, Jim O'Brien 2, Jim O'Brien; Con: Arthur Mansill 2, Alf Scott 3, Neville St George		Try: Wally Desmond, Lou Brown, Wilson Hall 2, Bert Avery, Len Mason, Frank Henry, Alphonsus Carroll; Con: Craddock Dufty, George Gardiner 3	Attendance: 14,000; Referee: W Mincham

==== Auckland v Otago (Northern Union C.C.) ====
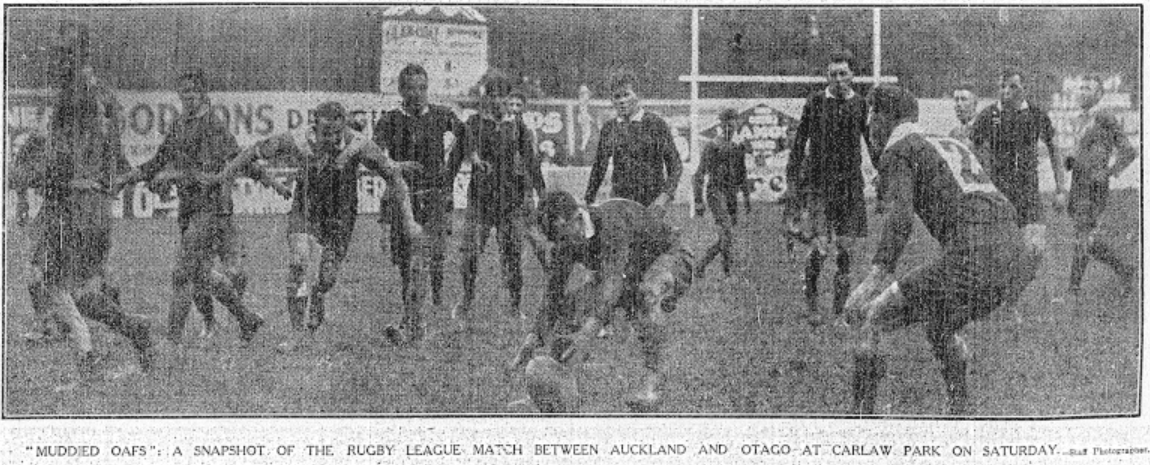
Auckland v Otago at Carlaw Park, 7 August 1926

Future Kiwi Len Scott also debuted for Auckland after coming on to replace the injured Harry Douglas.

7 August	Auckland	14–4	Otago	Carlaw Park 1
3:00	Try: Claude List, George Wade, Tim Peckham, Bert Payne; Con: George Wade		Pen: Bert Eckhoff 2	Referee: Harlock

==== Auckland v Canterbury (Northern Union C.C.) ====
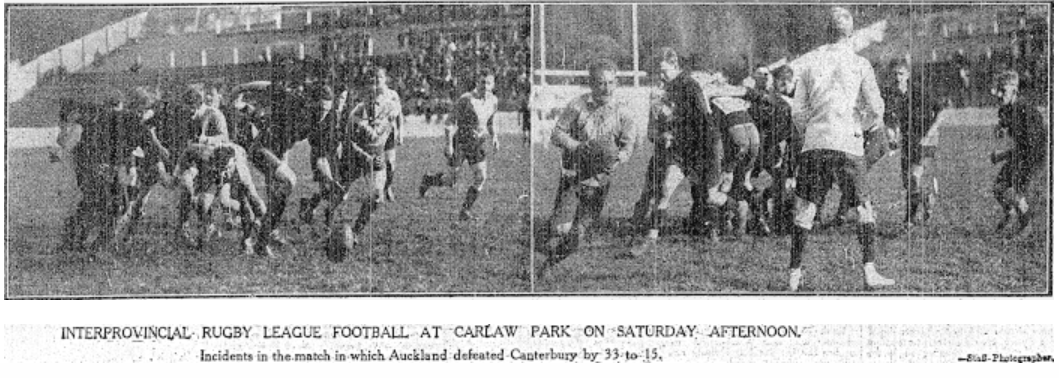
Auckland v Canterbury

28 August	Auckland	33–15	Canterbury	Carlaw Park 1
3:00	Try: George Wade 4, Claude List 2, Ivan Littlewood, Horace Dixon, Albert Payne; Con: George Rayner 2, Alf Scott		Try: C Batchelor, Le Warne, G Dawkins; Con: A Collie 2 Pen: A Collie	Attendance: 7,000; Referee: R.T. Hill

==== Auckland v South Auckland (Northern Union C.C.) ====
9 October	Auckland	25–8	South Auckland (Waikato)	Carlaw Park 1
3:00	Try: Claude List 3, George Wade, Jim O'Brien, Allan Seagar 2 Con: Alf Scott 2		Try: Davis, Metcalf; Drop: George Rayner	Attendance: 3,000; Referee: William Mincham

==== Auckland Colts v B Division representatives ====
30 October	Auckland Colts	24–17	B Division Representatives	Carlaw Park 1
3:00	Try: Hammond, George Wade, Allan Seagar, Sydney Usher 2, Ernest Ruby; Con: William Hanlon, Allan Seagar, Crewther		Try: Thompson 2, Clarke, Croxson, Unknown x 1 Con: Eustace	Referee: A Saunders

=== Auckland representative matches played and scorers ===
This list only includes the Auckland team games against South Auckland (x2), The Rest (of NZ), New Zealand, Otago, Canterbury, and South Auckland (Waikato)

No	Name	Club Team	Play	Tries	Con	Pen	DG	Points
1	Claude List	Kingsland	4	7	0	0	0	21
1	George Wade	City	4	7	0	0	0	21
3	Frank Delgrosso	Ponsonby	2	6	0	0	0	18
4	Jim O'Brien	Devonport	6	5	0	0	0	15
4	Alf Scott	Devonport	4	1	6	0	0	15
6	Tim Peckham	Ponsonby	3	1	0	0	0	11
7	Arthur Mansill	Newton	3	0	5	0	0	10
8	Maurice Wetherill	City	4	3	0	0	0	9
8	Bert Avery	Grafton	1	3	0	0	0	9
8	Horace Dixon	Devonport	4	3	0	0	0	9
11	Ivan Littlewood	Ponsonby	4	2	0	0	0	6
11	Albert Payne	Ponsonby	5	2	0	0	0	6
11	Allan Seagar	Devonport	1	2	0	0	0	6
14	Ben Davidson	City	1	1	0	0	1	5
15	Craddock Dufty	Grafton	1	0	2	0	0	4
15	George Rayner	Grafton	1	0	2	0	0	4
17	Lou Brown	City	1	1	0	0	0	3
17	Hector Cole	Ponsonby	1	1	0	0	0	3
17	Stan Webb	Devonport	1	1	0	0	0	3
17	J Lewis	City	1	1	0	0	0	3
17	Stan Prentice	Richmond	4	1	0	0	0	3
17	Jim O'Brien	Marist	2	1	0	0	0	3
23	Arthur Singe	Marist	1	0	1	0	0	2
23	Neville St George	Devonport	2	0	1	0	0	2
25	Alf Townsend	City	4	0	0	0	0	0
25	Lou Hutt	Ponsonby	3	0	0	0	0	0
25	Alan Clarke	Newton	2	0	0	0	0	0
25	Frederick Bass	Richmond	1	0	0	0	0	0
25	Charles Gregory	Marist	1	0	0	0	0	0
25	Hec Brisbane	Marist	1	0	0	0	0	0
25	Ernie Herring	Grafton	1	0	0	0	0	0
25	Len Scott	Devonport	1	0	0	0	0	0
25	Billy Ghent	City	1	0	0	0	0	0
25	Trevor Hanlon	Richmond	1	0	0	0	0	0
25	Lawrence Leonard Riley	Ponsonby	1	0	0	0	0	0
25	Eric Cleaver	Devonport	1	0	0	0	0	0
25	Harry Douglas	North Shore	1	0	0	0	0	0
25	Bill Davis	Richmond	1	0	0	0	0	0

== Annual general meetings and club news ==
Auckland Rugby League Juniors On 16 March Auckland Rugby League held its Junior Management Committee annual meeting where it was noted that the number of teams during the 1925 season was 75, with approximately 1,200 registered players. The full Auckland Rugby League annual report stated that in 1925 there were 12 senior teams and 103 junior teams playing in the various competitions, representing an increase of three senior and 28 junior teams. There was a total of 2,364 playing members. It was also noted that the total receipts from club fixtures was £3,136 and the total amount taken at all games was just over £7,000. The executive intended on spending money on improving the dressing accommodation for players at Carlaw Park, and when funds permit constructing a permanent grandstand.
