= Lyall Stewart =

New Zealand international rugby league footballer

Personal information
- Full name: Lyall Douglas Stewart
- Born: 10 July 1900 Auckland, New Zealand
- Died: 7 July 1968 (aged 67) Ōpōtiki, New Zealand

Playing information
- Weight: 61 kg (9 st 8 lb)

Rugby league
- Position: Stand-off, Centre
Club
Years	Team	Pld	T	G	FG	P
1921	Power Board (Cambridge)	6	3	0	0	9
1921–24	Hamilton Athletic	13	4	0	0	12
1922	Cambridge Athletic	4	1	1	0	5
1922	Newton Rangers (ARL)	3	0	0	0	0
1924–25	Marist Old Boys (ARL)	14	3	0	0	9
1926	Devonport United (ARL)	8	4	0	0	12
	Total	48	15	1	0	47
Representative
Years	Team	Pld	T	G	FG	P
1921–23	Cambridge (sub union)	10	6	3	0	24
1921–23	Cambridge/Hamilton (sub union)	5	2	0	0	6
1921–23	South Auckland (Waik.)	9	3	0	0	9
1923	Hamilton (sub union)	4	2	1	0	8
1923	Auckland Province	1	1	0	0	3
1924	Auckland B	1	0	0	0	0
1924	New Zealand	1	0	0	0	0

Rugby union
Representative
Years	Team	Pld	T	G	FG	P
1928	Opotiki (rep)	3	0	0	0	0

Lyall Douglas Stewart (10 July 1900 – 7 July 1968) was a New Zealand rugby league player. In 1924 he represented New Zealand in the 3rd test in Dunedin against the touring England and became Kiwi number 163 in the progress.

== Early life ==
Stewart was born on 10 July 1900 in Auckland, New Zealand. His parents were William Stewart and Sarah Ann Stewart. He was the youngest of seven children and had four brothers and two sisters: Robert William Wilson (1887); Henry Charles Stewart (1889); Luke Erroll Stewart (1891); Sarah May Elvin Stewart (1893); Mary Jane Stewart (1896); and David Arthur Stewart (1898). His birth registration shows his first name as in fact spelt “Lyell” as it also was on his death certificate. However on his marriage registration he spelt it “Lyall”. He also named one of his younger children Lyall, and it was spelt this way in newspaper articles on the rare occasion where his full name was used while he was alive.

== Playing career ==
=== Cambridge and Hamilton ===
Stewart began playing rugby league at the senior level in 1921 for the Power Board team in Cambridge. He was aged 20 at the time, turning 21 mid-season. His first match was against the City Rovers club team also from Cambridge on April 16 with his side losing 6-3. Two weeks later Stewart played for the Cambridge sub union representative team against the touring Ponsonby United side which featured a young Frank Delgrosso. Stewart scored a try in a 9-3 win.

With rugby league in its infancy in the Cambridge area Stewart played for the Power Board side and representative teams interchangeably throughout the year. By the season end he had played 6 matches for Power Board, 4 for Cambridge, 3 for a combined Cambridge-Hamilton team, 3 for the South Auckland representative team and 1 for Hamilton Athletics at the season end in the Hamilton knockout competition. The first match for South Auckland was against Hawke's Bay on August 10 and saw his side win easily by 35 points to 3 with Stewart scoring a try after some lead up play by Huatahi Paki. Five days later Stewart scored a try for Cambridge against the touring City Rovers team from Auckland at Victoria Square in Cambridge. His Cambridge team won 16-14 over a City side which featured George Paki, Maurice Wetherill, and Tim Peckham. The following weekend Stewart played for South Auckland against Auckland at Claudeland Showgrounds in Hamilton and in front of 2,500 spectators South Auckland ran out 13-3 victors. In the August 31 edition of the Waikato Times it was said of Stewart that he “is a tricky player who will reach big football. He has a nice side-step, and should be played inside five-eighth. [But] he has the failing of passing too soon when on attack. Stewart then played in a win for Cambridge over Hamilton 18-16 where he scored another try “as a result of smart following up and good judgment”. Stewarts last representative match of the season came in his first appearance on Carlaw Park. On September 17 South Auckland played Auckland and were defeated 35-13 in front of 5,500 spectators. Stewart scored South Auckland’s first try after picking up a loose ball and cutting through scoring by the posts.

His final match of the season was on September 24 in his first appearance for Hamilton Athletics, a club side he would not appear for again until 1923. In October, 1921 a special meeting was held in Cambridge by the Cambridge Rugby League. The meeting was to select the player who had shown the most improved form during the season. Lyall Stewart was nominated along with R. Pau, C. McMillan, Kidd, and J Hemmingway. After voting had taken place Stewart was announced as the winner and was presented with a gold football badge which had been given to the union by Ernie Asher of the Auckland Rugby League who had recently visited with the City Rovers side.

In 1922 Stewart turned out for the newly formed Cambridge Athletics side in the Cambridge competition which featured 4 teams (Cambridge Athletics, Matangi, City Rovers, and Suburbs). He was then granted a transfer to go to the Newton Rangers club in Auckland. This move turned out to be brief as he only played 3 matches for Newton. These included a 15-5 loss to Marist Old Boys, a 32-8 win over Richmond Rovers, and a 19-13 loss to City Rovers. These matches would have been a significant step up in quality for Stewart. Although there were many talented players in the Waikato competitions the Auckland Rugby League was reasonably well established by 1922 and the City side featured George Davidson, Ben Davidson (who would go on to play for Wigan), Bill Davidson, Maurice Wetherill, Alf Townsend, George Paki, and Bert Laing, while Stewart was playing alongside Clarrie Polson, Wally Somers, Bill Williams and Lou Brown (who would go on to play over 300 games professionally in England). On July 3 Stewart then transferred back to Cambridge where he re-joined his Cambridge Athletics team. He played 2 matches for them and 4 matches for Cambridge with at least two of them as captain. The first was in a 21-12 loss against Hamilton where he scored a try and kicked a conversion and a penalty. Stewart then led his side to Auckland where he scored a try and kicked a conversion though this would have been overshadowed by the 73-29 score line in favour of Auckland. The home side running in a remarkable 17 tries.

Stewart then played in a trial match for Cambridge before representing them twice more in losses to Lower Waikato and Auckland B, by 36 to 8 and 22 to 8 respectively. Cambridge and Hamilton then fielded a combined side against Hawke's Bay though Stewart was again on the losing side in a 17-3 defeat. He was selected days later to play for South Auckland against the same Hawke's Bay side and this time he was on the winners team, playing five eighth in a 17-15 victory.

At this point in the season disappointment was expressed at Stewart's non selection in the South Auckland side to play Auckland from Cambridge rugby league quarters. It was said that “Stewart is a cool, collected player, possessing much initiative and ability to demonstrate same. Many times on Saturday he placed the locals on attack from defence. Although given fewer opportunities his play was ahead of Wilson Hall… apart from that it is distinctly disappointing to the Cambridge League and the selectors will find that it is a mistake”. Nonetheless the South Auckland team won on Carlaw Park 21-20. Stewart did gain selection for South Auckland on September 30 when they played Auckland at Steele Park in Hamilton and they ran out 26-18 winners. He then wrapped up his 1922 season with a 20-9 win for South Auckland over Waihi in Waihi.

In 1923 Stewart joined the Hamilton Athletic club which played in the Hamilton league. He played 6 matches for them before playing for the Hamilton representative side against the Marist Old Boys, a team he was to play for the following year. They won the match 23-13 though Stewart took a knock to the head which saw one observer state that “for a long period in the first session he was quite dazed”.

Over the following 2 months he played 4 matches for Hamilton Athletics and 2 for the Hamilton representative side against Cambridge and Taumarunui which were won 32 to 11, and 43 to 7 respectively. Stewart scored a try and kicked a goal in the match against his old Cambridge side on Victoria Square in Cambridge, and a try against Taumarunui at Hinemoa Park, Hamilton. The match with Taumarunui was a defence of the Endean Shield which Hamilton had won off Lower Waikato two weeks prior.

On August 18 South Auckland played Wellington with Stewart in the five eighth position alongside F. Jackson, with Tim Peckham at halfback. South Auckland won by 27 points to 11. Stewart then wore the red and white of Cambridge against Hamilton in a 13-9 loss, and the following week switched sides, playing in the black and white jersey of Hamilton in a 27-20 win over Lower Waikato. He then played for a combined Cambridge-Hamilton team against Lower Waikato and he scored twice in a 31-25 victory at Victoria Square in Cambridge. Stewart’s next match was for South Auckland against Auckland at Steele Park. The match was for the Northern Union Challenge Cup which South Auckland held. Stewart score a first half try in a 20-20 draw which meant his side retained the trophy. He followed this up with an appearance for the Auckland Provincial team against Auckland at Carlaw Park. He continued his try scoring run with a 3-pointer in a heavy 44-15 loss to the Auckland ‘city’ team before a crowd of 7,000. He finished the season playing for South Auckland against Auckland again. He scored his 6th try in as many matches, however his team were well beaten in front of 6,000 spectators at Carlaw Park by 35 to 11.

=== Move to Auckland and New Zealand Test Appearance ===
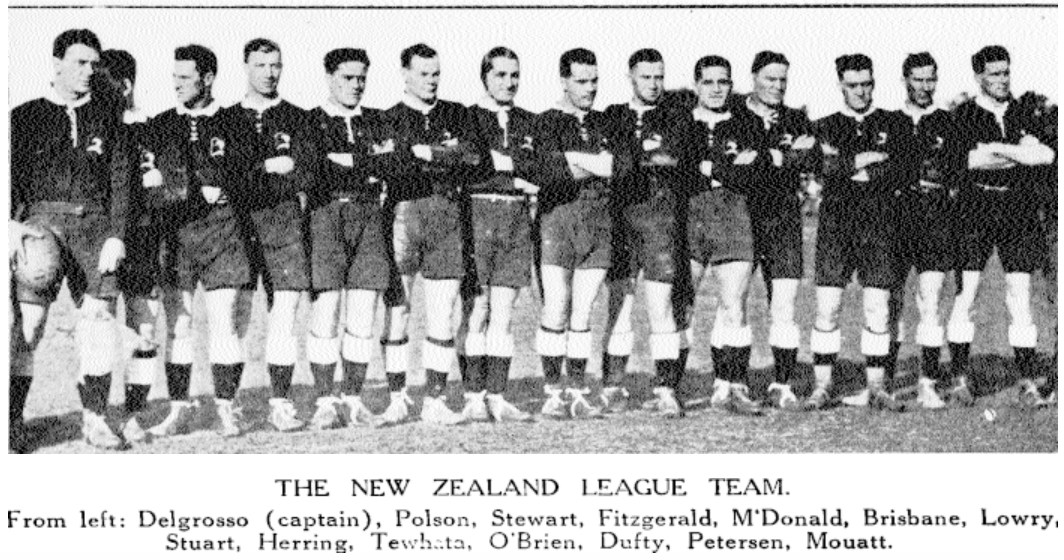

In 1924 Stewart was to move to Auckland to play rugby league for a more lengthy period than the 3 games he stayed for in 1922. After two matches for Hamilton Athletic against the Frankton Albions, and United teams, Stewart transferred to Marist Old Boys in the Auckland Rugby League competition. He had applied for a transfer on May 6 but it was not granted by the Hamilton Rugby League and was instead referred to the South Auckland Rugby League. The matter was discussed at length at the South Auckland Rugby League monthly meeting and it was eventually decided to grant him a transfer. The league was not particularly keen on allowing the move however and wrote a “strongly-worded protest against the apparent recruiting in the country districts by Auckland clubs, also intimating that this League would not grant transfers of players under its jurisdiction, unless good reason be shown. The delegates of from the League to the New Zealand Council were instructed to bring the matter very strongly before the members of the Council”.

After the transfer was granted Stewart made his debut for Marist in a round 5 match against Richmond Rovers in the five eighth position. He played a match against Athletic before being selected for an Auckland Probables side to play against the Auckland Possibles. With the tour of the England side approaching efforts were underway to choose the best players in the country to face them. Stewart was to partner Wilson Hall in the five eighths positions against Peebles and Hector Cole in the Possibles side. Stewart’s side lost 9 to 14. After more club matches Stewart was then selected for the Auckland B team to play Hamilton on July 16. Auckland B won the match 28-18 with Wilson Hall breaking his collar-bone.

On July 28 Auckland played the English side and after the match the New Zealand squad was selected to go into training for the first test with England. Stewart was named in the squad though despite Wilson Hall being out injured there were still many five eighths and halves named in the squad. Charles Fitzgerald and Maurice Wetherill were named in the five eighth positions in the first test which New Zealand won 16 to 8 however Wetherill was unable to travel to Wellington for the second test. In addition to this halfback Thomas McClymont was injured in the first test and so Stewart was pulled into the side to travel south. Despite the unavailability of at least 3 potential halves Clarrie Polson and Frank Delgrosso were selected ahead of Stewart for the second test which New Zealand won 13-11. Stewart’s opportunity came in the 3rd test where he was selected in the second five eighth position with Frank Delgrosso on his inside and Hec Brisbane his outside. The match was played at Tahuna Park, Dunedin and saw a crowd of 12,000 in attendance. Opposite him stood Sid Rix in the England side. It was an inauspicious debut for Stewart with New Zealand going down to the brilliant back play of the English side by 31 points to 18. He was described as “being the weak link in the chain, and in consequence of this the New Zealand three-quarters were starved”.

Stewart was to finish the season by playing in 9 further matches for his Marist Old Boys club side. On September 27 he played in the championship final against Devonport United in front of an enormous crowd of 17,000. His side were victorious by 20 points to 17 and won their first ever title in the process.

=== Hiatus, Return for Devonport United, and Retirement ===
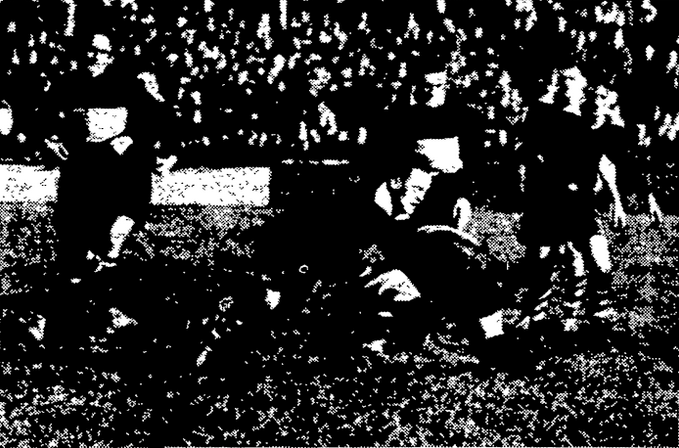
Stewart on the right with Seagar behind him.

In 1925 Stewart appears to have not played at all before a return to the game in the jersey of Devonport United. In 1926 he played 13 matches for them and for the only time in his career did not play in any representative matches. At the end of the season it appears that Stewart retired from rugby league and he moved to the Ōpōtiki area in the Bay of Plenty where league was not played.

=== Reinstatement to rugby union ===
In 1928 Stewart applied for and was granted reinstatement into the rugby union code. In the same year he played for Opotiki against Whakatane, Rotorua, and Rangitaiki. It appears that he turned out in a rugby league match at some point in 1929 or 1930 as in 1931 he once again applied for reinstatement into rugby with the Bay of Plenty Union supporting his cause.

== Personal life ==
He married Moyra (Moira) Clare Kelly on August 22, 1928. Moyra was born in Ōpōtiki in 1905. Together they had six children. Moyra died on 23 December 1954 aged 49. In the Otago Daily Times of 25 February 1931 it was reported that at about midnight Stewart's one year old child was bitten by a rat with the bite going through the baby’s left hand and “caused considerable bleeding”. The only other mentions beyond this time of Stewart and his family were of his children’s efforts at school in the Opotiki area and an accident Stewart suffered with an axe whilst cutting wood in 1933. He cut his foot and required several stitches.

Lyall Stewart died on 7 July 1968, three days short of his 68th birthday, in Ōpōtiki.
