= Hector Cole =

New Zealand rugby league player

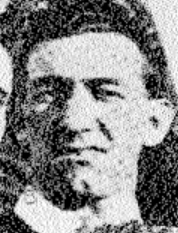

Personal information
- Full name: Hector Stanley Esmond Cole
- Born: 12 February 1902 Auckland, New Zealand
- Died: 21 October 1981 (aged 78) Auckland, New Zealand

Playing information
- Height: 178 cm (5 ft 10 in)
- Weight: 72 kg (11 st 5 lb)
- Position: Stand-off, Centre
Club
Years	Team	Pld	T	G	FG	P
1922–29	Ponsonby United	52	9	3	0	33
Representative
Years	Team	Pld	T	G	FG	P
1925–26	Auckland	5	2	2	0	10
1925	Auckland B	3	2	2	0	10
1926	North Island	1	2	0	0	6
1926–27	New Zealand	15 (2)	1	0	0	3
1927	New Zealand XIII (Auckland Members)	1	0	0	0	0
- As of 3 September 2020

Hector Stanley Esmond Cole was a New Zealand rugby league player who played for the New Zealand in 1926 and 1927. He made 14 appearances for them and was Kiwi number 183. He also played several times for Auckland and represented the Ponsonby United club from 1922 to 1929.

== Early life and family ==
Hector Stanley Esmond Cole was born on 12 February 1902. He was the son of Catherine and John Cole. Hector was the middle child of seven. He had 3 older brothers, Reginald John Edward (b.1896), Albert James Merrick (b.1898), and Horace Gordon Clifford (b.1900), a younger sister Esma Mary Elizabeth (b.1907), and two younger brothers Roy Ernest Kitchener (b.1910), and Cecil Edwin Horatio (b.1913).

== Playing career ==
=== Ponsonby United debut and early career ===
Hector Cole began playing for the Ponsonby United senior side in the Auckland Rugby League competition in 1922. His older brother by 6 years, Reginald, was honorary secretary of the Ponsonby club in 1921-23 and for many years after was involved in their administration. He was still on the club committee into the early 1930s.

Hector Cole's debut came on 22 April against Newton Rangers in a 15–10, round 1 win on Carlaw Park which had opened the previous season. He played in the first five position throughout the season. His only try came in a 41–20 thrashing of Newton in the Roope Rooster semi-final after he took a pass from Thomas McClymont and pushed his way through. He was also part of the side which won their third Roope Rooster end of season knockout title when they defeated Athletic in the final 11–10.

In 1923 he played 14 matches for Ponsonby who once again won the Roope Rooster competition with a 14–3 win over City Rovers in front of 7,000 spectators. During this season he played in an inaugural 7-aside tournament on a Wednesday night under electric lights. It was the first time football matches had been played under lights possibly in New Zealand, with 3,000 spectators attending. During the evening sprint races were held with Cole taking part. He won his heat by seven yards in a time of 11.25 seconds, while New Zealand Olympic sprinter George Davidson who was playing for City Rovers won heat 2 in a time of 11.15 seconds. Davidson had come fifth in the 200m final at the Antwerp Olympics in Berlin 3 years earlier.

The following season he played 7 matches for Ponsonby though he spent the middle portion of the season not named in the squad or else only in the reserves. He did however play in the Probables v Possibles trial match which was played as curtain-raiser to the third Auckland v Australian University match on 14 June. His final match of the season was in the Roope Rooster final once again however this time his Ponsonby team was on the losing end on a 5–6 result to City Rovers.

=== Representative debut ===
The 1925 season saw Cole make his representative debut. He had been in rare try scoring form with 5 tries for Ponsonby in 7 matches. In a match with Richmond he scored two tries which were described in the New Zealand Herald: "Cole, beating several men, scored behind the posts" and "Cole scored next for Ponsonby, after beating several opponents with clever side-stepping". He was then picked in an Auckland trial side. The trial was played on 27 June as a curtain-raiser to the North Island v South Island match while an Auckland side also took on South Auckland (Waikato). He played in the five-eighths position for Auckland A alongside Roy Hardgrave in a 0–5 loss to the Auckland B team. Just five days later Cole made his full Auckland debut in a match against the New Zealand team which had been selected to tour Australia. He was again partnered with Hardgrave with Auckland going down 6–19 to the national side at Carlaw Park. He played 3 more championship matches for Ponsonby who were to finish runners-up to City Rovers. Cole was then selected for Auckland to play South Auckland (Waikato) in a match for the Northern Union Challenge Cup. The match was played in front of 3,000 spectators at Carlaw Park and saw Cole set up 3 tries in a 24–16 win. The first saw him start a movement leading to an Ivan Littlewood try in the corner, the second saw him again combine with Littlewood who scored again, while the third saw him put away by Clarrie Polson and he beat "several opponents" before passing to George Gardiner who scored.

Cole's next match was the Roope Rooster final where Ponsonby defeated City 10–5 to win their 4th Roope Rooster title. Cole was selected to play for Auckland against the returning New Zealand team back from their Australian tour. Auckland went down heavily in front of 15,000 spectators with Cole playing five-eight in a 17–41 loss. He was chosen in the New Zealand squad to play the first match against the touring Queensland side but was named in the reserves and did not take the field.

He was then chosen for the Auckland B southern tour. They played West Coast in Greymouth and won 22–15 with Cole scoring twice and converting a try, he then played in a 5–6 loss to Canterbury at Monica Park in Christchurch before the final match against Wellington at Newtown Park which saw Auckland B win 68–9. Three days later, on 19 September he played for Auckland against South Auckland with Riley playing with him in the five eighths positions and Frank Delgrosso at halfback. Both players were Ponsonby teammates of Cole. Auckland won easily 36–19 to retain the Northern Union Challenge Cup. He finished the season by playing for Ponsonby in a 23-22 Stormont Shield semi-final win over Marist Old Boys and then the 35-3 Stormont Shield final win over City Rovers. This was the first ever time that the Stormont Shield had been competed for. It was a memorial trophy named after the New Zealand international, and Marist player Bill Stormont who had died 3 months early from rheumatic heart disease aged just 26.

=== New Zealand selection and English Tour ===
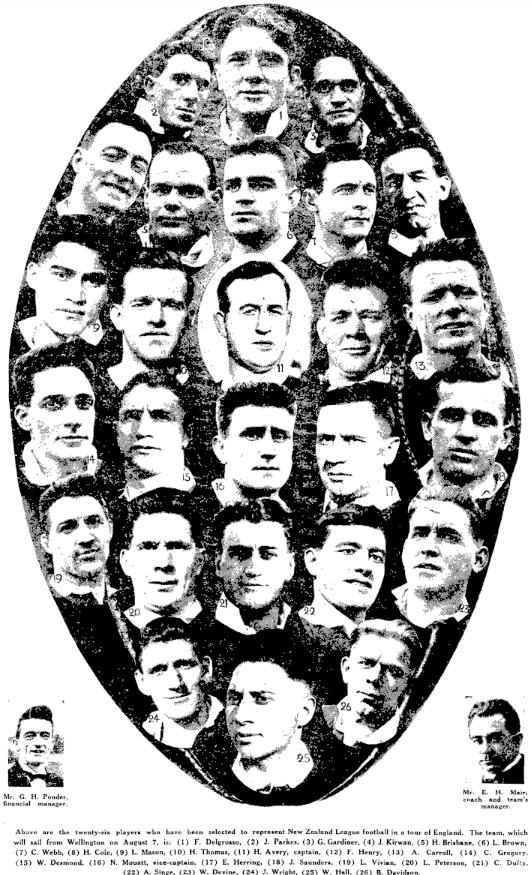
The NZ team to tour England and Wales with Hector Cole, second row from top on the extreme right.

Cole played 7 matches for Ponsonby to begin the 1926 season before gaining selection for Auckland to play South Auckland (Waikato) on 26 June. The match was intended as a trial match to see the form of the local players with a view to the selection of the New Zealand team to tour England and Wales later in the season. Auckland won 49–15 with the match so one-sided that at halftime and Auckland leading 33-3 they loaned several players to the Waikato side. Cole played brilliantly at five eighth making many breaks and according to The New Zealand Herald "was always in the thick of attacking movements. He was the best back". A week later he was picked to play for the North Island in the inter-island match with the South Island. The North Island won 31–22 in front of an enormous crowd of 18,000 at Carlaw Park. Cole played magnificently, scoring 2 tries. This performance ultimately sealed his place in the New Zealand touring side. He played alongside Jack Kirwan and Tim Peckham in the halves. Cole's first try came after he went through from halfway and with the fullback Bert Eckhoff out of position ran in for a try. Then Peckham in a "scissors" move with Cole sent him over for his second try. He was also involved in tries to Ivan Littlewood and Ben Davidson. During the second half he received a bad nose injury and was forced from the field.

Cole was then selected in the backs as part of the 26 man touring side for the 1926-27 New Zealand rugby league tour of Great Britain.

The tour would ultimately be regarded as a disaster from a New Zealand standpoint. There were several disputes with management and 7 players went on strike. They refused to play under the leadership of manager Ernest Mair and were later banned for life, while the tour record of 17 wins and 17 losses was underwhelming. Cole played in 15 matches including the first of the tour against Dewsbury which saw New Zealand win 13–9 in front of 16,000 spectators at Harrogate on 11 September. Critics declared that Cole was "excellent" and his performance was reliable with his "straight running proving a constant source of worry to the Dewsbury men". He was selected to play the third tour match against Halifax but was ruled out through an injury to his knee. He next appeared against Rochdale Hornets in an 11–9 win where he was said to have made "some strong runs and his tackling was a thorn in the side of the Rochdale forces". Cole played five-eight once again in a 19–16 defeat of Barrow in front of 5,500 spectators. Cole registered his only try of the tour against Widnes on 29 September. He scored New Zealand's first try in a 15–5 win with 6,000 fans looking on. Cole was then in the side which went down 17–5 to Warrington in atrocious conditions, though in this match he had been moved into the centres alongside Hec Brisbane. New Zealand's performance in a cabled report from London was described as "third rate" and Cole along with Stan Webb were said to be "negligible in defence and ineffective in attack".

It was 11 days until Cole would play again on Wednesday, 20 October. It was in a 38–17 thrashing of Bradford Northern in front of 4,500 spectators. He made a "beautiful run, side-stepping several men, but was grassed just on the line" early in the match. Then early in the second half with New Zealand in trouble he intercepted a pass and ran to the Bradford 25m line before passing to Hec Brisbane who, "beating all opposition, ran over for the finest try of the day". Cole sustained a leg injury later in the match and had to go to the fullback position, switching with Craddock Dufty. Cole then played at five-eight against Leeds a week later, and he was paired with Wilson Hall who played halfback. Cole was said to have kicked "judiciously, and often penetrated the Leeds defence by his brilliant straight running". He was moved back to the centres for a 14–28 loss to St Helens Recreation on 30 October and played there again in an 18–10 win over Salford 4 days later.

On 13 November, Cole made his test debut when he came in as a last minute injury replacement in the second test against England at the famous Boulevard Ground in Hull. New Zealand went down 21–11 in a match played in heavy first half rain before it cleared for the second half. Ben Davidson had sustained an ankle injury "a week or two previously" and did not recover in time to take his place in the starting line up so Cole joined the back-line in the centres. Cole was partnered with Jack Kirwan and the two of them were said to be "putting in some great work on attack, and England's inside backs, brilliant as they undoubtedly were, were sorely tried". They two of them combined to beat "all opposition" before Kirwan handed on to Lou Brown who scored to make it 11–13 in favour of England. England scored soon after and then again on full time to seal their win.

It was 2 weeks before Cole played again. He was at second five eighth in their 14–16 loss to a powerful Swinton on 27 November with 13,000 in attendance. He twice, "by straight dashes from the scrum, was nearly over. The third time he was actually over and grounded the ball, but was called back for some infringement". New Zealand outscored Swinton 4 tries to 2 but goal kicking proved the difference. It was a similar story in their match with St Helens on 8 December when they lost 12-22 despite scoring 4 tries, the same number as the winners. Cole was once again back in the centres with Jack Kirwan. Cole didn't appear in the New Zealand side again until their match with Pontypridd on Christmas Day at Taff Vale Park. They won 17–8 with Cole in the centres again though this time he was partnered with Ben Davidson. He played with Davidson again in an 18–3 win over Cumberland at a cold and wet Workington on 8 January.

The final match of the tour was the third test with England. Cole was to play in his second test match which New Zealand lost 17–32 at Leeds in front of 8,000 spectators in wet conditions once again. Early in the match from a counter-attack New Zealand rushed down field but Cole dropped "the ball when on the point of scoring".

=== Return to New Zealand, retirement and club comeback ===
After the touring side returned to New Zealand shores Cole played in a New Zealand side composed (almost) entirely of the Auckland members as the others had either returned to their homes or had been banned by the New Zealand R.L. for their part in the strike on tour. Their opponents were the best of the rest of Auckland and the Auckland side ran out 24–21 winners in front of 14,000 spectators at Carlaw Park on 30 April. The New Zealand Herald on 6 April had reported that "Cole was not a success with the New Zealand team, but his form was not true. In club matches Cole is a useful five-eighths." Unfortunately for Cole he would not get the chance to play for Ponsonby again for quite some time. He had badly injured his nose in the match with Auckland, which he had first done the previous season in the North Island v South Island match and he decided that he would retire temporarily for the 1927 season.

Cole came out of retirement on 20 August for Ponsonby's round 14 win over Richmond Rovers. He made two more appearances for them in a round 1 Roope Rooster win over Grafton followed by a semi final loss against Devonport United.

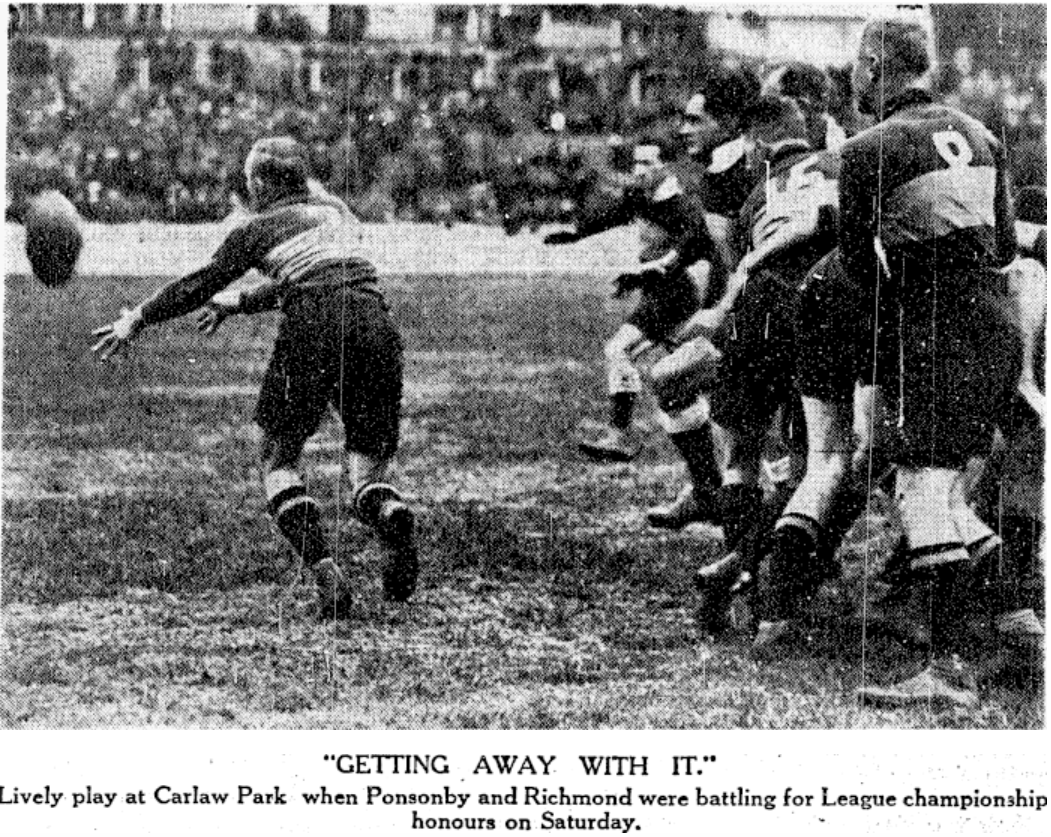
Cole in the back ground at first five for Ponsonby in their May 26, 1928 game against Richmond.

In 1928 he played seven times for Ponsonby early in the season but was named to play on the wing in his last match and then was omitted from the team altogether for the rest of the season. On 4 August New Zealand played England at Carlaw Park in the first test of the series and in the evening a complimentary dinner was held for the teams. As part of the evening ceremonies medallions were presented to Cole along with his fellow Auckland "loyalists" from the 1926-27 touring team (Bert Avery, Frank Delgrosso, Hec Brisbane, Craddock Dufty, Stan Webb, George Gardiner, Jack Kirwan, Charles Gregory, and Ernie Herring). The medallions were presented by New Zealand Rugby League chairman Mr. C.A. Snedden.

Then in 1929 Cole was to play his last season of competitive rugby league. He was regularly named twelfth in the squads printed in the newspapers ahead of the matches indicating he was playing in the second row. However, there were no mentions of him in any of the actual match reports. Then following the 6 July match with Richmond Rovers it was said that "the appearance of Cole, a member of the 1926 combination which toured England, caused some interest. Cole played really well and in better form should improve Ponsonby's attack". He had played at five-eight, replacing Thompson in this match which they won 21–16. He was named to play in a handful of matches for Ponsonby through to the end of the championship which they won for the 5th time in club history though it is likely that he did not take the field in many, or even any of these matches. He retired at the end of the season. In 1931 he participated in an 'old timers' match, playing for Mortinsen's team against Opai Asher's team on Charity Day at Carlaw Park. Then in 1932 he was selected to play for the Ponsonby 'old-timers' match against City Rovers in their annual clash.

== Personal life and death ==
Hector Cole married Florence Gladys Verrall (1900–1986) on 9 June 1923 (she was born on 21 Dec 1900). Hector worked as a bookbinder and cutter and in 1942 was living at 30 Kingsley St, Grey Lynn in Auckland according to the records of The New Zealand Gazette.

His nephew John Cole also later played for Ponsonby.

Hector died on 21 October 1981 aged 78 years of age. His wife Florence died on 19 February 1986.
