= Ivan Littlewood =

New Zealand rugby league and union footballer

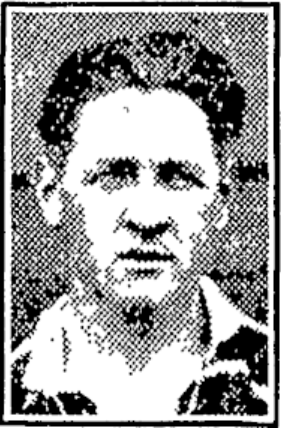

Personal information
- Full name: Inglis Ivan Irwyn Levers Littlewood
- Born: 20 October 1902 Hamilton, Waikato
- Died: 26 July 1951 (aged 48) Taupiri, Waikato

Playing information

Rugby league
- Position: Wing, Centre
Club
Years	Team	Pld	T	G	FG	P
1920	Taupiri	1	0	0	0	0
1921–22	Maritime/Athletic	17	17	1	0	53
1922	Ponsonby United	3	8	1	0	26
1923	Taupiri	5	3	0	0	6
1923–26	Ponsonby United	55	41	9	0	141
1927–29	Ellerslie United	34	16	2	0	36
1934	Ponsonby United	5	2	0	0	6
	Total	120	87	13	0	268
Representative
Years	Team	Pld	T	G	FG	P
1919–20	Lower Waikato	2	1	0	0	3
1920–22	South Auckland	2	0	0	0	0
1921–27	Auckland	22	13	2	0	43
1922	King Country XIII	1	2	0	0	3
1925	New Zealand	1	0	0	0	0
1926	North Island	1	1	0	0	3

Rugby union
Club
Years	Team	Pld	T	G	FG	P
1923	Marist (Hamilton, WRU)	3	1	0	0	3
1929	City (ARU)	8	2	0	0	6
	Total	11	3	0	0	9
Representative
Years	Team	Pld	T	G	FG	P
1923	Hamilton (rep)	4	0	0	0	0

Inglis Ivan Irwin Levers Littlewood (20 October 1902 – 26 July 1951) was a rugby league player who represented New Zealand for the first time in 1925. In so doing he became Kiwi 181. He also represented the Lower Waikato, South Auckland (northern Waikato), and Auckland representative rugby league teams from 1919 to 1927.

== Early life ==
Ivan Littlewood was born on 20 October 1902 in Taupiri, in the Waikato region of New Zealand. He was the son of Sarah Jane and Frederick Walker Littlewood. Ivan was the second youngest of twelve children with 8 older sisters; Mary Esther May, Ruby Ethel Wardlow, Laura Mabel Hamilton, Ivy Eleanor Muriel, Alice Eliza Pearl, Gladys Evelyn Elsie, Eileen Frances, and Bertha Margaret, a younger sister; Ada Dorothy Winifred, and two older brothers; Frederick Henry Carlton, and Albert. His father Frederick died on 26 May 1914 in Taupiri.

== Playing career ==
=== Waikato beginnings ===
Ivan Littlewood began his playing career in the Waikato region. The first record of him playing was for the Lower Waikato representative side against the touring Australian team on 18 September 1919. He would have been a month short of his nineteenth birthday. Littlewood played in the three-quarters, setting up his sides only try in a 58–5 loss.

In 1920 he again appeared for Lower Waikato and played in a match against King Country on 17 July. Lower Waikato won the match 15–7 with Littlewood scoring one try. A week later he played for the South Auckland representative side against the touring England side. The South Auckland team were well beaten by 49 points to 10 in front of 7,000 spectators at Steele Park in Hamilton. Littlewood was forced from the field with an injured shoulder.

=== Move to Auckland ===
In April 1921 Littlewood transferred to Auckland where he joined the Maritime club who played in the Auckland Rugby League competition. He initially played in the Maritime 2nd grade side for the 2nd and 3rd rounds before making his senior debut on 14 May against Newton Rangers where he scored a try in a 12–10 win. Littlewood went on to score 12 tries in first grade matches for Maritime which placed him second highest try scorer behind future Kiwi, Ben Davidson who scored 13. Maritime finished runner up for the Monteith Shield for the first grade championship, and runner up for the Roope Rooster knockout competition losing to City Rovers in the final. Littlewood was also selected to play for Auckland in their representative match with Wellington on 20 August. Auckland won 23–21 at the Basin Reserve in Wellington with Littlewood scoring a try under the posts to give Auckland a 13–8 lead.

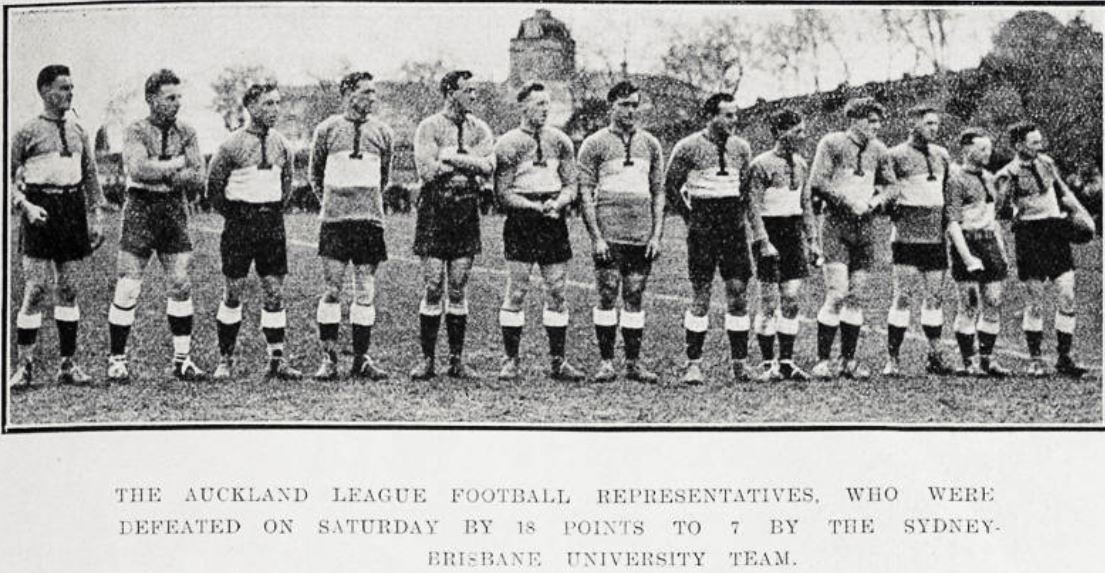
Littlewood 3rd from the right in the Auckland team to play the 2nd match against the Australian Universities side at the Auckland Domain on 24 June 1922

The 1922 season saw a name change for Littlewood's Maritime club with them becoming known as ‘Athletic’. He played 7 matches for them, scoring 5 tries before transferring to Ponsonby United on 2 August. For Ponsonby he scored a remarkable 8 tries in just 3 matches, including 5 in the Roope Rooster semi final against Newton Rangers giving him 13 total for the season (again the second highest try scorer in Auckland rugby league). This form saw Littlewood again selected for the Auckland team where he played 4 matches against New Zealand Māori on 20 May which was lost 18–28 in front of 7,000 spectators at Carlaw Park. He then played 2 matches against the touring Australian University side in mid-June where he scored a try in the first match which was lost 12–13, before a 7–18 loss in the second match with over 12,000 spectators present. Littlewood then played against the touring New South Wales side on 16 September in a 25–40 loss though Littlewood did cross for a try in the match played on the Auckland Domain in front of a massive crowd of 20,000.

=== Move back to Waikato ===
In mid-September, following the match with New South Wales, Littlewood moved back to the Waikato and the following weekend he played for South Auckland against the same New South Wales side. He was again on the losing side with the visitors winning 17–12 at Steele Park, Hamilton. He played New South Wales 2 days later for a King Country XIII which was made up of players from far and wide. They were trounced 87–16 in the match which was played at Taumarunui though Littlewood did cross the line twice. The first saw him field the ball on his own goal before "dodging Toohey and Proctor [and running] the length of the field" while the second came after "a dash down the line".

In 1923 Littlewood began the season playing for the Taupiri rugby league team. He played 5 matches, scoring 3 tries, two against Orini, and 1 against Huntly. Unfortunately in Taupiri's match against Huntly on 22 May they had 2 players sent off and 2 others left the field "in sympathy". This left the team "sadly depleted" for their following match having to field several juniors and the team began defaulting matches. Littlewood then switched codes along with other players from his Taupiri team and finished the season playing for the Marist rugby club for 3 matches. He scored a try in their win over United 12–3. He scored another try in a match for Hamilton B against Waipa before playing 4 full representative matches for the Hamilton side against Raglan, Cambridge, Morrinsville, and Matamata.

=== Back to Auckland again ===
In the same year (1923) Littlewood returned to his former Ponsonby United side in Auckland for the Roope Rooster matches. He scored 3 tries and kicked 3 goals against Richmond Rovers, a goal in their win over Marist Old Boys and was part of their 14–3 Roope Rooster knockout final victory over City Rovers where he scored a try. He finished the season with two appearances for Auckland, scoring a try and kicking a conversion in a 44–15 win over Auckland Province, followed by a match with South Auckland which Auckland also won comfortably by 35 points to 11.

The 1924 season saw Littlewood play 17 matches for Ponsonby, scoring 6 tries and kicking 3 conversions. He played for Auckland B against Hamilton on 16 July, scoring a try in a 28–18 win to go with 3 appearances for the full Auckland representative side against the touring Australian University team. Auckland won the first match 15–7 with Littlewood scoring twice. His first try came after a run and kick which he followed up and secured before scoring under the posts. Auckland won the second match 17-2 and drew the third 14–14 with all 3 matches at Carlaw Park in front of 7000, 4000, and 12,000 spectators respectively.

The following season saw Littlewood continue to turn out for Ponsonby where he had an outstanding season scoring 16 tries in 17 games, helping his side to a runner up position in the Monteith Shield and victories in the Roope Rooster and Stormont Shield finals. Ironically he had sought to be reinstated into rugby union after round 1 but was declined by the Auckland Rugby Union. After playing 7 matches for Ponsonby he had scored 10 tries and was selected to play in an Auckland trial match on 27 June before being picked for Auckland to play against the New Zealand national side on 2 July in a 16–9 loss. The New Zealand team was preparing to embark on a tour of Australia.

He then played three more times for Auckland. The first was against South Auckland in a 24–6 win where he scored twice, the second against the returning New Zealand team on 29 August which saw Auckland lose 41–17, while the third was in an 18–18 draw against the touring Queensland team.

Following this he was selected to make his New Zealand debut against the same opponents. His selection was well deserved as he was arguably the most prodigious try scorer in New Zealand rugby league over the early 1920s. He was selected to play on the wing in a back line which featured Charles Gregory, Jack Kirwan, Jim Sanders, Frank Delgrosso, Maurice Wetherill, and Stan Webb. Unfortunately Littlewood had a game to forget, being involved in 2 errors leading to tries for the visitors which saw the Queensland side run out to a 35–17 win at Carlaw Park before 15,000 spectators. The New Zealand Herald said of Littlewood that he "was a distinct disappointment and gave Queensland two simple tries". This was to be his only appearance in a Kiwi jersey.

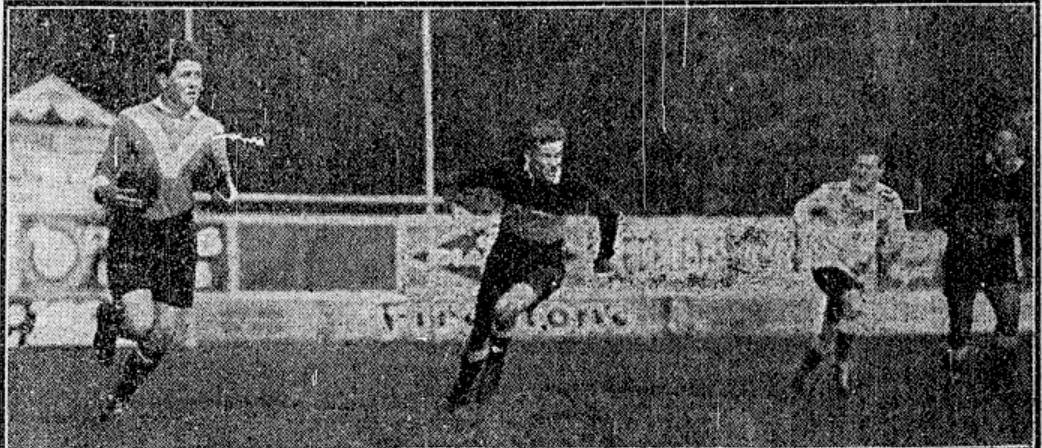
Ivan Littlewood with the ball for Auckland against 'The Rest' at Carlaw Park on July 7.

The 1926 season was to be another busy season for Littlewood. He appeared in 15 matches for Ponsonby United, scoring 8 tries in a season which saw them lift the Monteith Shield by winning the first grade competition for the 4th time after a win over City Rovers, and then the Stormont Shield with a 15–5 win over Richmond Rovers in the final with Littlewood playing in both matches. Littlewood also played in the North Island side and scored a try in a 31–22 win over the South Island. His other representative matches were for Auckland against 'The Rest' of New Zealand where he scored a try in a 21–28 loss, New Zealand in a 52–32 win, Otago in a 14–4 win, and South Auckland where Auckland again won by 25 to 8.

=== Move to Ellerslie United and switch to rugby union ===
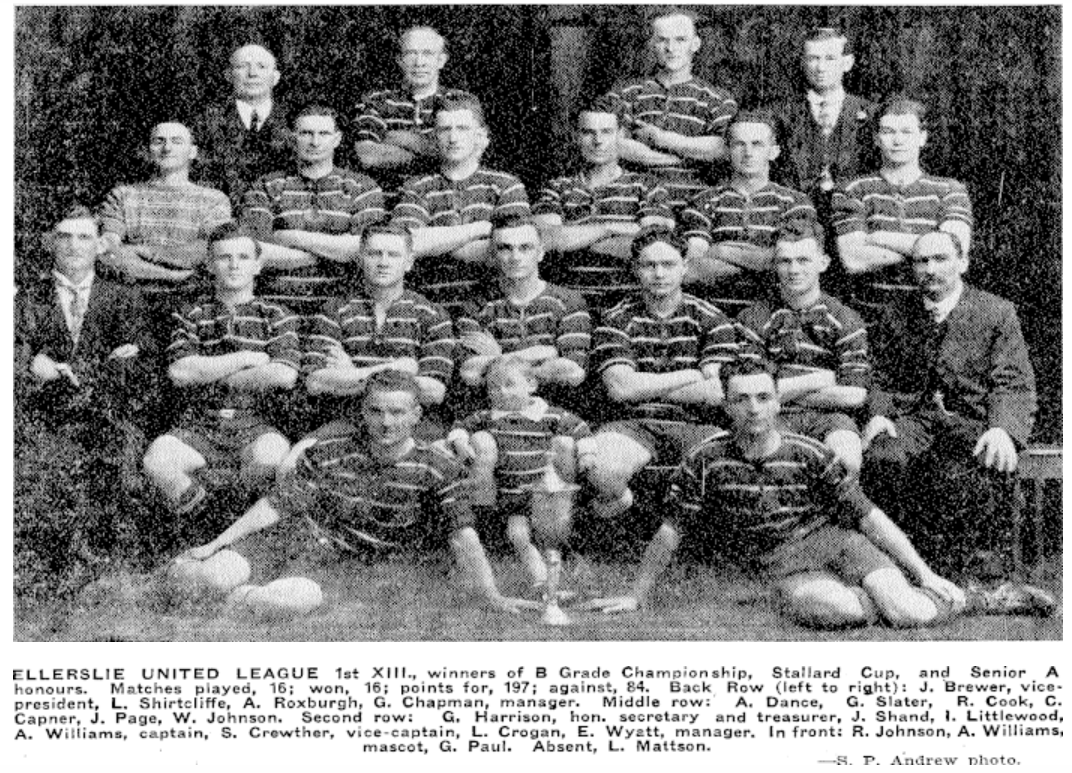
Littlewood (3rd from the left in the 2nd row) in the 1927 B-Grade champion Ellerslie side.

The 1927 season saw Littlewood transfer to the Ellerslie United club. They were in the Auckland Rugby League second division at the time. Despite having moved to a lower grade team Littlewood was still selected for the Auckland side in a match against the Auckland members of the New Zealand team which had recently returned from its disastrous tour of England which saw 7 players banned for life for refusing to play in many matches due to a dispute with team management. Littlewood scored a try in a 24–21 win in front of 14,000 spectators at Carlaw Park. In 13 games for Ellerslie, Littlewood scored 5 tries including one in the promotion-relegation match against Grafton which they won 11–3 to gain promotion. Ellerslie struggled in the first grade winning just 3 of their 12 matches with Littlewood scoring 8 tries in their 15 total matches for the season. Though they were competitive in most matches and they did gain wins over Ponsonby United, City Rovers, and Marist Old Boys. The following year saw Littlewood play 6 further matches for Ellerslie which were all lost before switching codes to join the City rugby club in Auckland. He was joining former Kiwi legend Karl Ifwersen at the City club and played 8 matches scoring twice. His move was not without controversy as 'code hopping' had caused frustration among officials of both codes and Bill Davidson complained that Littlewood had "turned over for the fourth time, and this sort of thing should be stopped".

=== Retirement and return to Ponsonby ===
Following the 1929 season Littlewood retired from both codes however in 1934 he applied for reinstatement to rugby league. This was approved and he rejoined his Ponsonby club for what was effectively his third stint with them. He played 9 matches for them, scoring a try in each of his first 2 appearances against Marist Old Boys, and Devonport United. The 1935 season was officially to be his ‘last’ as he was named in the Ponsonby reserve grade squad though he did not take the field.

== Personal life, and death ==
Ivan Littlewood married Vera Petley who had been born in Coromandel on 19 December 1923. They had four children, a daughter named Norma born on 8 July 1924 a son Ivan Walker Littlewood born on 11 August 1925 a daughter Peggy born ???? and a son Rex Littlewood 1931. All born in Auckland. They were divorced in June 1942 after having lived apart for 3 years. Vera later remarried to Frederick Charles Barker. Ivan senior died on 26 July 1951 while living in Taupiri. Vera died on 3 November 1989 while living in Milford, Auckland. Their sons Rex died 1934(aged 3) and Ivan died in Papakura on 30 May 1991. Norma died on 31 August 1993 and Peggy in 20??.
