= Frank Delgrosso =

New Zealand international rugby league footballer

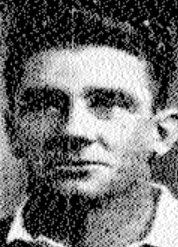

Personal information
- Full name: Frank August Delgrosso
- Born: 3 November 1899 Auckland, New Zealand
- Died: 29 July 1981 (aged 81) Point Chevalier, Auckland, New Zealand

Playing information
- Height: 5 ft 9 in (1.75 m)
- Weight: 11 st 7 lb (73 kg)

Rugby union
Club
Years	Team	Pld	T	G	FG	P
1918	Ponsonby RFC	8	0	0	0	0

Rugby league
- Position: Wing, Stand-off, Halfback
Club
Years	Team	Pld	T	G	FG	P
1919–33	Ponsonby	192	57	307	1	787
Representative
Years	Team	Pld	T	G	FG	P
1919–29	Auckland	23	13	22	0	83
1921–28	New Zealand	42	10	22	0	74
1924–25	Auckland Province	2	1	4	0	11
1925–29	North Island	3	3	7	0	23
1928	New Zealand XIII	1	0	0	0	0

Coaching information
Club
Years	Team	Gms	W	D	L	W%
1928–34	Ponsonby United	36	18	3	15	50
1945–48	Ponsonby United	21	14	0	7	67
	Total	57	32	3	22	56
Representative
Years	Team	Gms	W	D	L	W%
1934	Taranaki	1	0	0	1	0
1934	Auckland	1	1	0	0	100

Frank Delgrosso (3 November 1899 – 29 July 1981) was a New Zealand rugby league player who represented New Zealand.

== Playing career ==
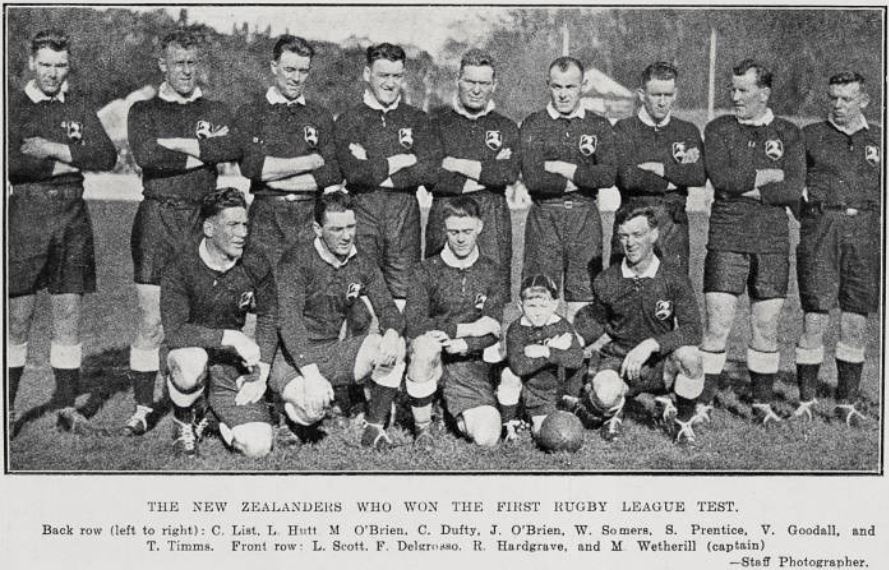
New Zealand team to play the 1st test v England on 4 August 1928 at Carlaw Park.

Frank attended St. Columba's School in Ponsonby. Following school he began playing for the Ponsonby player in the Auckland Rugby League competition, Delgrosso was first selected for the New Zealand side in 1921. He made his Test debut against Great Britain in 1924 and went on to play in nine Test matches. This included captaining New Zealand in the second and third Test matches in 1924. He also played for the Auckland Provincial team in 1924 and scored a try in a 13–28 loss. He was part of the 1926-1927 tour of Great Britain.

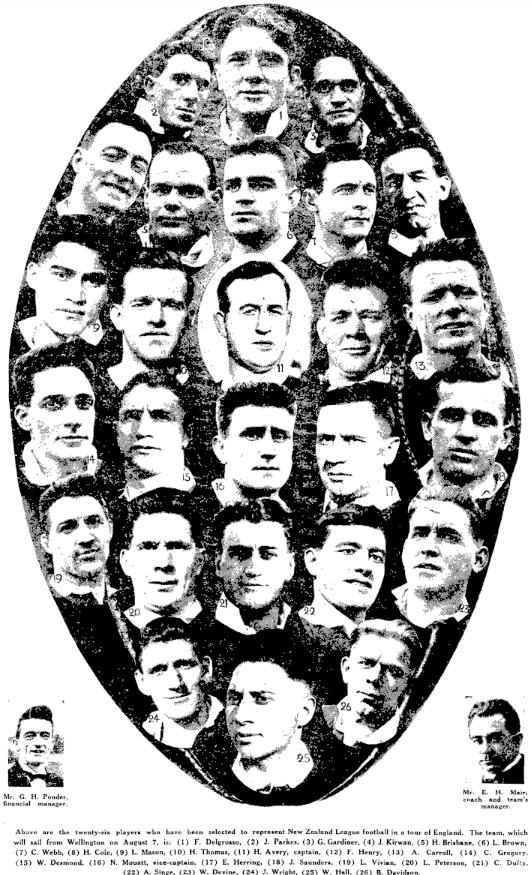
The NZ team to tour England and Wales with Frank Delgrosso in the centre of the top row.

Delgrosso was also an Auckland representative and was part of the side that won the Northern Union Cup in 1919 as well as playing for both Auckland City and Auckland Province against touring sides. His nickname during his playing career was "Delly". In 1925 Delgrosso was selected for the North Island team in an inter-island match as part of the lead up to selecting the New Zealand side. He scored a try in a 27–9 win. In October of that year he also played for the Auckland Provincial team against the touring Queensland side. He kicked a conversion and 3 penalties however Auckland was trounced by 54 points to 14 against an outstanding opponent.

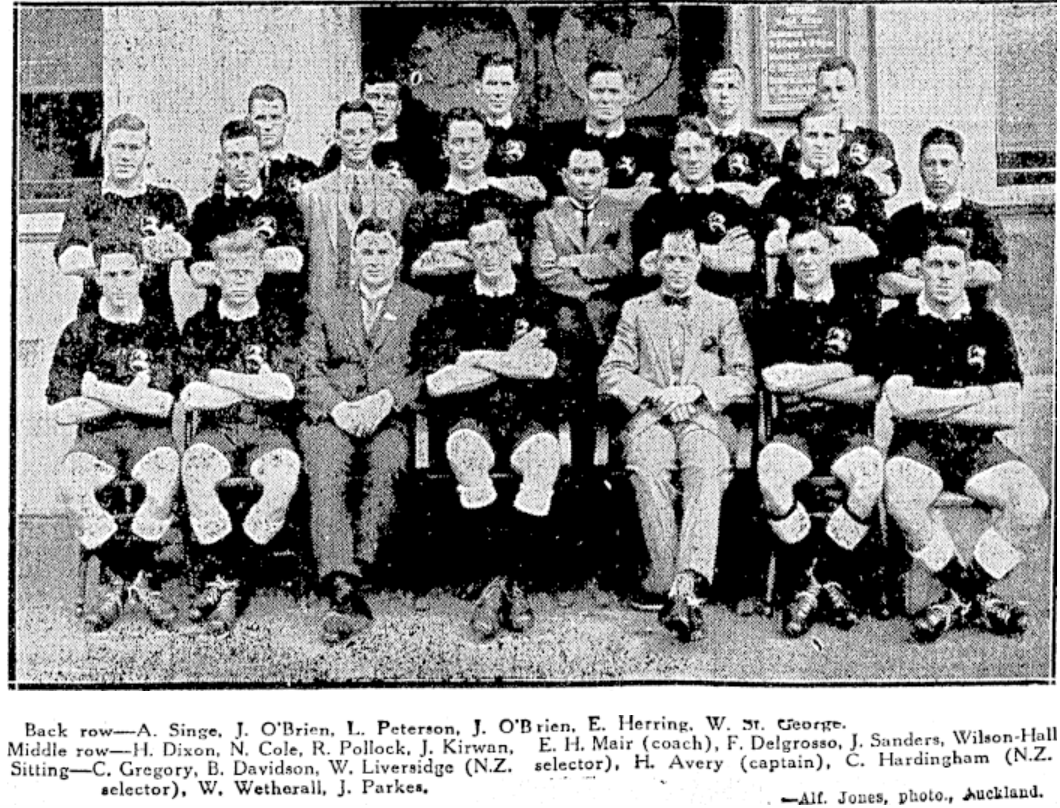

In the 1927 season he scored 43 points for Ponsonby which was the 4th highest in the competition; however, he did not play in any of the Auckland representative matches. He did, however, play against Auckland early in the season for the New Zealand Auckland representative team.

Delgrosso captained Ponsonby in 1929 and 1930. At the end of 1930 Delgrosso was sensationally suspended for three seasons by the Auckland Rugby League, which would have effectively ended his career. Delgrosso was accused of failing to get one of his sent off teammates to leave the field, throwing mud at the referee, and using foul language. At a management committee meeting in March, 1930 they decided to remit the remainder of his suspension after he apologised for his actions. He began his playing career again at the beginning of the 1931 season and top scored through the first grade championship and Roope Rooster competitions with 70 points from 35 goals. He again top scored in the competition in 1932 with 74 points. The 1933 season was to be his last. He played the first 3 matches of the season before being injured in a Round 3 match with Marist and leaving the field. He decided to retire at this point, finishing his club career with a remarkable 191 appearances in a Ponsonby jersey, scoring 787 points, comfortably the most of any player in Auckland club history to this point.

== Coaching, administrative and refereeing career ==
In 1934 he coached the Ponsonby senior side. He also coached the Taranaki side in their match against Auckland and then coached Auckland in a match against Northland with Thomas McClymont then taking the coaching reigns for Auckland's match against South Auckland (Waikato) towards the end of the season. In 1935 he was elected Ponsonby club captain and on the executive committee in 1937. In 1939 he stood for a position on the refereeing board and was elected. He began by refereeing lower grades, ranging from schoolboys through to the 3rd to 6th grades. Delgrosso was also appointed as a linesman for the senior matches at Carlaw Park in June and also refereed senior B fixtures. Beyond this season there is no record of him continuing any official involvement in Auckland rugby league match officiating.

== Personal life and death ==
Frank Delgrosso was born 3 November 1899, and was the son of Maud Alice and Dominic Delgrosso. He had a brother named Victor who was 4 years younger. Frank married Ivy Beatrice King on 16 February 1921, in Ponsonby, Auckland, and they had a daughter, Ivis Maud (1921-1945), in the same year. They had a son, Francis Dominic Delgrosso (1924-2005), who served during World War II. Ivis became engaged to marry Frederick Alexander Cammick in December 1940.

His mother, Maud, died in 1932, and his father, Dominic, died in 1948. Frank's wife, Ivy, died in 1960, while his brother Victor died in 1961. Frank died in 1981 at age 81. His son Francis died on 24 September 2005.
