= 1919 Auckland Rugby League season =

The 1919 season of the Auckland Rugby League was its 11th. It was the first season post World War I and unsurprisingly it saw a resurgence in playing numbers with 56 teams across the six grades. North Shore Albions who had previously dropped out of the senior competition again fielded a senior side. As did Otahuhu, who had dropped out during the 1917 season. Ponsonby United won their third consecutive first grade title, while Newton Rangers won the Roope Rooster trophy.

The season was also summarised by the league as well. Forty-nine teams were entered across all grades. Sunnyside won the second grade, Manukau won the third grade, City won the fourth and fifty grades, while Ponsonby won the sixth grade. It was stated that the standard of play in the senior club competition was not as good as it would have been due to the fact that 19 of the best club players from Auckland were away for a large part of the season representing New Zealand in Australia.

Preceded by 1918	11th Auckland Rugby League season 1919	Succeeded by 1920

== Club news ==
=== Club teams by grade participation ===
Team	1st Grade	2nd Grade	3rd Grade	4th Grade	5th Grade	6th Grade	Total
Ponsonby United	1	1	1	0	2	1	6
City Rovers	1	1	0	1	1	1	5
Otahuhu Rovers	1	1	1	1	1	0	5
Maritime (*includes 4th, 5th, & 6th Telegraph Messengers)	1	1	0	1	1	1	5
North Shore Albions	1	1	0	0	1	1	4
Manukau Rovers	0	0	1	1	1	1	4
Richmond Rovers	0	0	0	1	1	1	3
Newton Rangers	1	0	0	2	0	0	3
Northcote & Birkenhead Ramblers	0	0	1	1	1	0	3
Sunnyside	0	1	0	1	0	0	2
Grafton Athletic	1	0	0	1	0	0	2
Marist Old Boys	1	0	0	0	0	0	1
Māngere Rangers	0	1	0	0	0	0	1
Total	8	7	4	10	9	6	44

=== Marist Old Boys enter first grade ===
A new club was formed, namely Marist Old Boys. They were composed of old boys of the Marist Brothers’ schools. They had initially included many members of the Railways rugby side of 1917 who fell out with the Auckland Rugby Union and in 1918 played under the umbrella of the Grafton Athletic club. While they would go on to wear the famous green of Marist in this initial year they took the field in blue jerseys. The senior club season commenced on 3 May.

=== Eden Ramblers club folds and Point Chevalier is founded ===
At the Auckland Rugby League meeting on 30 April it was announced that the Eden Ramblers club had been disbanded. They had formed in 1911 and played in the senior competition from 1911 to 1913 before becoming a lower grade club until this season. Curiously though 3 weeks earlier on April 5 however it was reported that a "new club that has just been affiliated is the Eden Ramblers, boys from Avondale and Point Chevalier". The new team however was not to become known as the Eden Ramblers but in fact were named Point Chevalier. Point Chevalier however did not field any teams in the 1919 season and it wasn't until the 1920 season that they were officially registered with the league.

=== Charitable efforts and league funds ===
During the war most of the revenue gained by Auckland Rugby League was donated to the war efforts meaning they could not make much progress financially towards developing the game and facilities. In 1919 they once again raised 75 pounds to distribute to local charities nominated by the mayor. They also put on a match at the end of the season to raise money for the St. John Ambulance Brigade. Due to the large crowds at some of the matches, including the match with Australia it was anticipated that the league would gain over 1,000 pounds to establish a fund for obtaining a playing ground. This would of course be Carlaw Park.

=== Scrum rules ===
At the end of the season J.B. Cooke stated in a meeting that next season the ball would be rolled into scrums and forwards would have to keep their feet on the ground while the halfback was putting the ball in. These changes were to “brighten the game”.

=== Representative season ===
The Auckland representative team was only able to play one inter provincial fixture against Hawkes Bay after matches with Canterbury and Wellington were unable to be scheduled due to the busy New Zealand representative schedule. Likewise Ponsonby were unable to schedule a defense of the Thacker Shield for the same reason. An Auckland Junior team was however able to make a trip out to Napier to play Hawkes Bay and they were victorious by 12 points to 5. Auckland played a match in front of an enormous crowd at the Auckland Domain against the touring Australian side but did not fair any better than the New Zealand national side, going down by 32 points to 8.

== Myers Cup (1st Grade championship) ==
Otahuhu's first grade team were to only last one round into the season before pulling out. Grafton also struggled to field a team when they lost players to the New Zealand team which was touring Australia. In round 6 rather than default they were provided with players from the City and Newton clubs however they too did not survive to the end of the competition. Ponsonby United won the championship for the third consecutive season.

=== Statistics ===
Including the knockout games there were 34 first grade games played with 182 tries, 68 conversions, 30 penalties, 3 drop goals, and 3 goals from a mark. The average number of points per game was 22.2, an increase of .7 from the previous season. There were 5.35 tries per game, compared to 4.31 the previous season. With 68 conversions from 182 attempts the successful percentage was only 37.4, a significant drop from 1918 when it was 47.1.

=== Myers Cup standings ===
Team	Pld	W	D	L	F	A	Pts
Ponsonby United	9	7	1	1	110	50	15
Newton Rangers	9	6	0	3	132	68	12
Maritime	8	5	2	1	123	88	12
City Rovers	8	5	0	3	96	67	10
North Shore Albions	10	4	1	5	95	94	9
Grafton Athletic	6	1	0	5	36	75	2
Marist Old Boys	8	0	0	8	22	148	0
Otahuhu Rovers	1	0	0	1	3	28	0

=== Myers Cup results ===
==== Round 1 ====
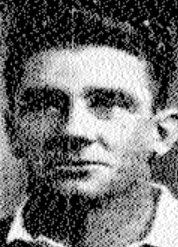

Round 1 saw the senior rugby league debut of Frank Delgrosso. He had played for Ponsonby rugby seniors in 1918 at the age of 18 but switched codes at the start of the season. Delgrosso would go on to become a New Zealand rugby league international in 1921 and play for New Zealand 42 times. He also played for the North Island 3 times and played 23 matches for Auckland including several as captain. Delgrosso also captained Ponsonby and played a remarkable 184 games for them from 1919 to 1934. At the end of his career he also began coaching their senior side and continued coaching into the 1940s. In 1934 he also coached both the Taranaki and Auckland sides in representative matches. He was later inducted into the Auckland rugby league hall of fame.

3 May	Maritime	12–10	City	Victoria Park 1
3:00	Try: Hogg, A Sutton; Con: George Davidson; Pen: George Davidson & 1 mark		Try: Bill Davidson, Jim Rukutai; Con: Bill Davidson; Pen: Bill Davidson	Attendance: 4,500; Referee: Adelbert Tobin

3 May	Newton	28–3	Marist	Victoria Park 2
3:00	Try: George Iles 2, Bill Cloke 2, Jack Keenan, Bill Williams; Con: Phil Castle 5		Try: Petterson	Attendance: 4,500; Referee: Frank Thompson

3 May	Ponsonby	26–3	Grafton	Auckland Domain
3:00	Try: David Norgrove, Stanley Chatfield, Laurie Cadman, Bill Walsh 2, R Cook; Con: Thomas McClymont 4		Try: Montgomery	Attendance: 500; Referee: William Wynyard

3 May	Otahuhu	3–28	North Shore	Otahuhu
3:00	Try: Hyland		Try: Stan Walters, Arthur Matthews, McAneny 3, Nelson; Con: McAneny 3, Unknown 2 goals

==== Round 2 ====
Otahuhu wrote to the league during the week that they had insufficient players to continue in the senior competition. However with a number of players returning from the front they would likely be able to enter a team in the Roope Rooster knockout competition later in the season.

10 May	Maritime	19–18	Newton	Auckland Domain
3:00	Try: Sheehan, George Davidson 3, A Sutton; Con: George Davidson 2		Try: George Iles 2, Wally Somers, Arthur Mansill, W Miller, Jack Keenan	Attendance: 4,000; Referee: Archie Ferguson

10 May	North Shore	3–16	City	Devonport Domain 1
3:00	Try: Leonard Boon		Try: Harry Wynn, Tom Haddon, George Reid, Robert Clark; Con: Bill Davidson 2	Attendance: 500; Referee: John Eddowes

10 May	Grafton	26–6	Marist	Devonport Domain 2
3:00	Try: Karl Ifwersen 3, Bob Mitchell, Osborne, Ernie Herring; Con: Karl Ifwersen 4		Try: Con McDevitt, Leo Casey	Referee: T Hill

==== Round 3 ====
17 May	City	12–10	Newton	Victoria Park 1
3:00	Try: Huatahi Paki, Bill Davidson; Con: Bill Davidson; Pen: Bill Davidson 2		Try: Billy Condon, Bill Williams; Pen: Phil Castle 2	Attendance: 5,000; Referee: John Eddowes

17 May	Maritime	11–5	Grafton	Victoria Park 2
3:00	Try: Arthur Sutton, Cargill, George Davidson; Con: George Davidson		Try: Walsh; Pen: Unknown (mark)	Attendance: 5,000; Referee: A Vause

17 May	North Shore	6–8	Ponsonby	Devonport Domain 1
3:00	Try: Archie Waddell, Stan Walters		Try: Jim Clark, Bill Walsh; Pen: Halliday	Referee: Len Farrant

==== Round 4 ====
There was confusion with the Round 4 draw with the newspapers listing the match between North Shore and Maritime when in fact it was Newton who were supposed to be the opponent. As a result, Newton players did not arrive at the ground. Eventually Newton found enough substitutes but they still began the game 2–3 players short. In spite of this they still managed to win by 14 points to 9. Also the City team took the field with 6 juniors while Grafton had 2 juniors and played a man short. The chief issue was with the New Zealand team touring Australia at the time meaning many key players were absent from their club teams. The Marist club was having trouble assembling a full thirteen players in its inaugural season in senior grade and their captain, Con McDevitt requested a postponement of their match with Ponsonby at the mid week ARL meeting and the request was granted. A number of their players moved to the Marist Rugby Union side around this time. R Osborne of the Grafton side badly sprained and ankle and was taken from the field for their side.

31 May	Newton	14–9	North Shore	Victoria Park 1
3:00	Try: Arthur Isles, Jack Keenan 2, George Iles; Pen: Arthur Isles		Try: Ernie Bailey; Con: McAneny; Pen: McAneny & 1 mark	Attendance: 2,500; Referee: A Ball

31 May	City	25–2	Grafton	Victoria Park 2
3:00	Try: H Hogan, Harry Wynn, Cole, George Asher, Robert Clark 2, George Reid; Con: George Asher 2		Pen: Billy Ghent	Attendance: 2,500; Referee: William Wynyard

31 May	Ponsonby	Postponed	Marist
3:00

==== Round 5 ====
In the match at Devonport the Marist team was led from the field by their captain, Con McDevitt with the score at 9–0 to North Shore in protest at a refereeing decision. After hearing the report of referee, Mr Cleal, and a statement from McDevitt, it was decided to suspend McDevitt for 12 months after it was he who had told the referee that he would be taking his team from the field in protest after the awarding of North Shore's third try and proceeded to do so. Cleal had said that the match to that point had been a "disgrace". McDevitt appealed to the New Zealand Rugby League however a few weeks later however the ARL decided as a Peace Day gesture to lift the ban.

7 June	Ponsonby	15–6	Maritime	Victoria Park 1
3:00	Try: Eric McGregor, J Brien, Laurie Cadman; Con: Eric McGregor, David Norgrove; Pen: Eric McGregor		Try: Arthur Sutton, Beacham	Attendance: 5,000; Referee: William Wynyard

7 June	North Shore	9–0	Marist	Devonport Domain
3:00	Try: C Nelson, Bertie Emirali, Jim Griffin			Referee: Cleal

7 June	Newton	WBD-LBD	Grafton	Victoria Park 2
3:00				Referee: J Ball

==== Round 6 ====
Grafton were not able to field a full team and were reinforced by players from Newton who had a bye. This was done so that they would not be forced to drop out of the competition. They were missing test players Karl Ifwersen and Dougie McGregor. Marist continued their difficult season with a heavy defeat and took the field with only 11 players.

14 June	Ponsonby	18–13	City	Victoria Park 1
3:00	Try: Stanley Chatfield, Laurie Cadman, Horace Neal, William Edwards; Con: Eric McGregor, David Norgrove 2		Try: George Paki, R Mitchell, penalty try Con: Harry Francis 2	Attendance: 7,000; Referee: John Eddowes

14 June	Maritime	34–0	Marist	Victoria Park 2
3:00	Try: George Davidson 4, Herb Lunn 2, Arthur Sutton 2 Con: George Davidson, Herb Lunn, Arthur Sutton, Vivian Hogg, Robert Bovaird			Attendance: 7,000; Referee: J Ball

14 June	North Shore	7–0	Grafton	Auckland Domain
3:00	Try: McAneny; Pen: McAneny 2			Referee: E Dempsey

==== Round 7 ====
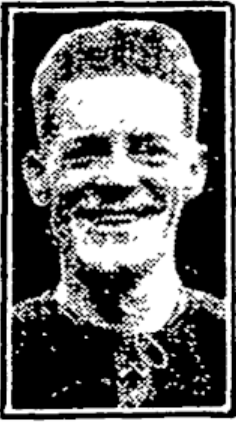
Nelson Bass

Nelson Bass debuted for Newton. He was selected for New Zealand in the same year and played 7 matches for them from 1919 to 1921. He would ultimately play 20 games for Newton before transferring to Marist in 1922 where he played 24 games over 2 seasons and then moved once more to City Rovers where he played 44 games over 4 seasons before suffering a career ending knee injury. Bass also played 21 games for Auckland and 2 for Auckland Province.

21 June	North Shore	12–15	Maritime	Devonport Domain 1
3:00	Try: McAneny 2, Bouvaird, penalty try		Try: George Davidson 3, George Robinson 2	Referee: Pullen

21 June	Newton	10–3	Ponsonby	Auckland Domain 1
3:00	Try: Jack Keenan 2 Con: Phil Castle; Drop: Leonard Newdick		Try: Arthur Rae	Attendance: 5,000; Referee: Billy Murray

21 June	City	WBD-LBD	Marist	Grey Lynn Park 1, Grey Lynn
3:00				Referee: Adelbert Tobin

==== Round 8 ====
28 June	City	17–15	Maritime	Victoria Park 1
3:00	Try: Horne, George Paki, George Reid; Con: Frank Postlewaight; Pen: Frank Postlewaight 3		Try: Bert Avery 2, George Robinson; Con: George Davidson 2 Pen: George Davidson	Attendance: 6,000; Referee: A Ball

28 June	Ponsonby	19–3	Newton	Victoria Park 2
3:00	Try: Eric McGregor, Stanley Chatfield 2, Sam Lowrie, Laurie Cadman; Con: Eric McGregor 2		Try: Jack Keenan	Attendance: 6,000; Referee: A Tobin

28 June	North Shore	13–8	Marist	Auckland Domain 1
3:00	Try: Keith Helander, Clinton Boryer, William Rundle; Con: Unknown x 1 Pen: Ernie Bailey		Try: Glynn, Smith; Con: Clarke	Referee: Len Farrant

==== Round 9 ====
The Auckland Star reported that the matches at Victoria Park saw the largest crowds for club games ever on that ground.

5 July	Ponsonby	7–4	City	Victoria Park 1
3:00	Try: David Norgrove; Con: Eric McGregor; Pen: Eric McGregor		Pen: Frank Postlewaight, Harry Francis	Attendance: 7,000; Referee: John Eddowes

5 July	Maritime	8–8	North Shore	Victoria Park 2
3:00	Try: George Davidson, Arthur Sutton; Con: George Davidson		Try: Alf Scott, C Nelson; Con: Ernie Bailey	Attendance: 7,000; Referee: William Wynyard

5 July	Newton	27–3	Marist	Victoria Park 3
3:00	Try: Leonard Newdick, Arthur Mansill, Jack Keenan 3, Nelson Bass, McLiver; Con: Jack Keenan, A Cowley, Iles		Try: Morton	Attendance: 7,000; Referee: T Hill

==== Round 10 ====
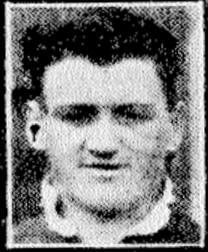
Craddock Dufty debuted for Newton

Round 10 featured two rarities. The Newton v North Shore match was played as a curtain-raiser to the Ponsonby v Maritime match on Auckland Domain 1. When matches were normally played at the same venue they all were played at the same time of 3pm on adjacent fields. In the 3rd match due to be played on the Domain the referee, Frank Thompson failed to turn up and after waiting for 40 minutes the decision was made to abandon the game. It was later revealed that he had been called away on an urgent business matter and had tried to contact the league but been unable to. The Auckland Rugby League accepted his explanation. The round was also significant for another reason. Craddock Dufty debuted for Newton and kicked 2 conversions. The previous Saturday he had played for Thames rugby representatives against Auckland and switched codes midweek. He was to go on to represent New Zealand for many years along with touring with the New Zealand Maori side and was a prodigious point scorer.

12 July	Newton	22–0	North Shore	Auckland Domain 1
1:30	Try: George Iles 3, A McSweeney 2, Billy Condon; Con: Craddock Dufty 2			Referee: Mr Clayton

12 July	Ponsonby	3–3	Maritime	Auckland Domain 1
3:00	Try: Arthur Cadman		Try: Bert Avery	Referee: Billy Murray

12 July	City	Abandoned	Marist	Auckland Domain 2
3:00				Referee: Frank Thompson (did not arrive)

==== Round 4 postponed match ====
20 July	Ponsonby	11–2	Marist	Victoria Park
3:00	Try: Eric McGregor, A Cross, Stanley Chatfield; Con: Unknown x 1		Pen: Unknown x 1

=== Roope Rooster knockout competition ===
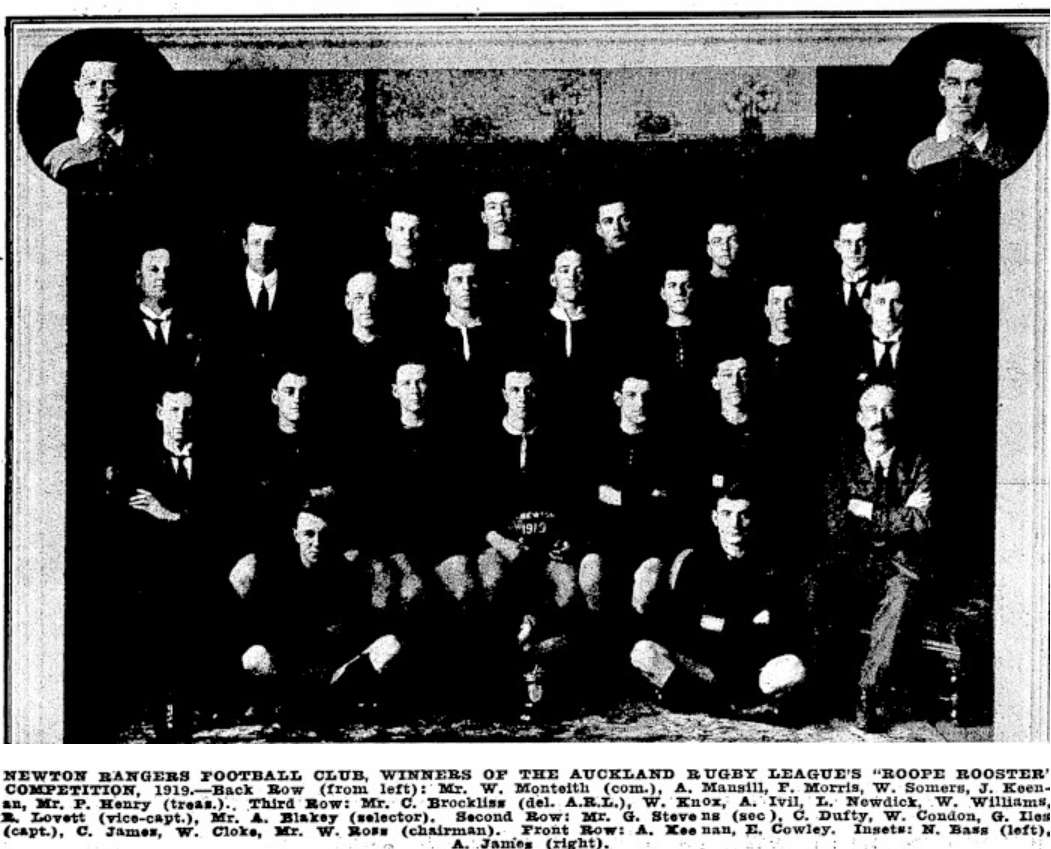
Newton Rangers, 1919 Roope Rooster winners.

The round 1 match between Ponsonby United and Newton Rangers was abandoned towards the end with Newton leading by 12 points to 10 after Ponsonby supporters encroached on the field in protest against the referee and refused to move back. Marist Old Boys recorded their first competitive win in their history with a round 1 win over North Shore Albions. The final was won by Newton Rangers after they defeated Maritime by 8 points to 5.

==== Round 1 ====
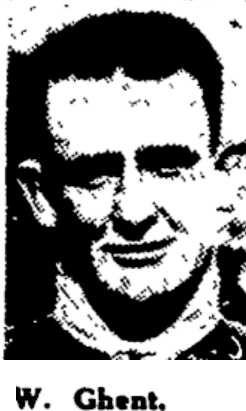
Billy Ghent scored his first try for Marist.

In the Newton match with Ponsonby there was no crossbar and so they tied a piece of string between the two posts to act as a makeshift marker for kicks at goal. The match was ultimately called off near fulltime after Ponsonby supporters objected to some refereeing decisions and were ten yards over the sideline. The referee Billy Murray and his assistants tried to clear the field but after the spectators failed to move he called the game off. The Auckland Rugby League ordered the match replayed the following week. In the Marist Memories book produced by the Marist club for their Golden Jubilee the Robinson brothers who played for Marist were in fact the Nunn brothers from Wellington. The story was retold by Bill Glover senior 50 years later that they were trying to avoid detection from the military police and gave aliases to the police. The Marist team featured several new players in their surprising win which was their first ever in first grade competition. One of them was Horace Nunn who had played rugby union for Wellington and the North Island. He was a deserter from military camp at Trentham and in 1920 was arrested and spent a year in prison with hard labour. After being released he joined the Petone rugby league club and played for Wellington and New Zealand in 1921.

26 July	Maritime	14–6	City	Auckland Domain 1
3:00	Try: Bert Avery 2, John Lang 2 Con: John Lang		Try: Robert Clark, Harry Francis	Referee: A Ball

26 July	Newton	10–8*	Ponsonby	Auckland Domain 2
3:00	Try: George Iles, A Thomas; Con: Craddock Dufty; Pen: Craddock Dufty		Try: Arthur Cadman, J Brien; Pen: A Cross	Referee: Billy Murray

26 July	Marist	17–3	North Shore	Auckland Domain 3
3:00	Try: White, Keenan 2 Con: Clarke, Billy Ghent; Pen: Horace Nunn (H "Robinson"), Clarke		Try: Leonard Boon	Referee: John Eddowes

==== Round 1 replay ====
The replay was described as "undoubtedly the fastest and most exciting" of the season.

2 August	Newton	12–10	Ponsonby	Auckland Domain
3:00	Try: George Iles, Wally Somers; Con: Craddock Dufty; Pen: Craddock Dufty; Drop: Craddock Dufty		Try: Sam Lowrie, Eric McGregor; Con: Thomas McClymont; Drop: S McNamara	Attendance: 8,000; Referee: Billy Murray

==== Semi final ====
Former New Zealand international Bob Mitchell had joined the Marist side and scored a try in their narrow loss.

16 August	Maritime	22–21	Marist	Auckland Domain
3:00	Try: George Davidson 2, Eric Grey 3, Arthur Sutton; Con: George Yardley, Arthur Sutton		Try: Sonny Hing, Tommy Harris, Bob Mitchell, Arthur Eustace 2 Con: Neville St George 2 Pen: Neville St George	Attendance: 5,000; Referee: Adelbert Tobin

==== Final ====
30 August	Newton	8–5	Maritime	Auckland Domain
3:00	Try: Nelson Bass, Wally Somers; Con: Bill Cloke		Try: George Cargill; Con: Arthur Sutton	Referee: A Ball

== Top try scorers and point scorers ==
The following point scoring lists include Senior Championship matches and the Roope Rooster competition matches only. George Davidson the champion New Zealand sprinter, who represented New Zealand at the 1920 Olympics top scored with 64 points and he also led the league with 14 tries.

Several teams featured multiple players with the same surname with many sets of brothers. As a result, some of the scoring lists are inaccurate. For Ponsonby Laurie Cadman scored 1, his brother Arthur Cadman scored 2, and "Cadman" scored 3. Laurie was also a boxer and in June 11 or 12, 1925 he disappeared from the Manaia steamer which was traveling from Tauranga to Auckland. His body was never found.

Rk	Player	Team	Tries
1	George Davidson	Maritime	14
2	George Iles	Newton	11
3	Jack Keenan	Newton	10
4	Arthur Sutton	Maritime	8
5	McAneny	North Shore	6
6	Bert Avery	Maritime	5
6	Stanley Chatfield	Ponsonby	5
8	Robert Clark	City	4
8	C Nelson	North Shore	4
8	Eric McGregor	Ponsonby	4

Rk	Player	Team	T	C	P	Mk	Pts
1	George Davidson	Maritime	14	8	2	1	64
2	George Iles	Newton	11	1	0	0	35
3	McAneny	North Shore	6	4	3	1	34
4	Jack Keenan	Newton	10	1	0	0	32
5	Arthur Sutton	Maritime	8	3	0	0	30
6	Eric McGregor	Ponsonby	4	5	2	0	26
7	Bill Davidson	City	2	4	3	0	20

== Lower grades ==
There were 5 lower grades in 1919. In the middle of the season the Post & Telegraph Football Club asked to be affiliated to the Maritime Football Club which had been formed a year earlier. This request was approved by the league.

=== Second grade (G Wright Cup) ===
Sunnyside won the championship after an 8-8 draw with City Rovers in the last round of the season. Sunnyside had been leading the competition at the time with City in second place. The City club asked for a rematch but were refused by the Junior Management Committee. Thames Old Boys, Marist Old Boys, and Newton Rangers all withdrew after round 2 with Marist and Newton defaulting their matches. There were 22 scores/results reported, with 26 scores/results not reported therefor the standings are considerably incomplete.

Team	Pld	W	D	L	B	F	A	Pts
Sunnyside	8	6	1	1	1	86	26	13
City Rovers	6	4	1	1	3	88	36	9
Otahuhu Rovers	7	5	0	2	1	69	50	10
North Shore Albions	5	2	0	3	2	29	55	4
Ponsonby United	2	2	0	0	1	0	0	4
Māngere Rangers	5	1	0	4	2	34	57	2
Maritime	7	1	0	6	0	48	130	2
Thames Old Boys	1	0	0	1	0	0	0	0
Marist Old Boys	1	0	0	1	0	0	0	0
Newton Rangers	1	0	0	1	0	0	0	0

=== Third grade ===
The third grade initially had 6 teams entered but several withdrew during the season and only Northcote and Manukau completed the season. Manukau won the competition and were undefeated however there were only 3 scores reported in the entire season (Northcote 0 Ponsonby 0, Manukau 18 Otahuhu 0, and Otahuhu 13 Ponsonby 0). Otahuhu also recorded a default win over Sunnyside in round 1 with the Sunnyside team then withdrawing from the competition. Thames Old Boys withdrew after round 2, Otahuhu following round 6, and Ponsonby following round 7. This left Northcote and Manukau to play each other on July 5, July 12, and July 19 before the competition stopped. None of these results were reported.

Team	Pld	W	D	L	B	F	A	Pts
Manukau	8	8	0	0	1	18	0	16
Northcote & Birkenhead Ramblers	4	0	1	3	0	0	0	1
Otahuhu Rovers	3	2	0	1	0	13	18	4
Ponsonby United	3	0	1	2	0	0	13	1
Thames Old Boys	0	0	0	0	0	0	0	0
Sunnyside	1	0	0	1	0	0	0	0

=== Fourth grade ===
City were reported to have finished one point ahead of Otahuhu and Maritime. Then followed Sunnyside, Richmond, and Northcote. Though there were a large number of results not reported so the table is incomplete. During the season the Post & Telegraph club affiliated with the Maritime Football Club and subsequently assumed that name. Grafton Athletic withdrew after 6 rounds, as did Manukau.

Team	Pld	W	D	L	B	F	A	Pts
City Rovers	9	8	1	0	0	137	16	17
Maritime (Post and Telegraph)	9	5	0	4	1	75	35	10
Otahuhu Rovers	6	4	1	1	0	34	16	9
Richmond Rovers	7	6	1	0	1	77	6	13
Sunnyside	8	3	0	5	0	27	93	6
Newton Rangers A	6	1	1	4	0	18	29	3
Manukau	3	1	0	2	0	10	25	2
Grafton Athletic	3	1	0	2	0	11	32	2
Northcote & Birkenhead Ramblers	6	0	0	6	0	12	45	0
Newton Rangers B	5	0	0	5	0	2	106	0

=== Fifth grade ===
City Rovers won the competition. Sunnyside withdrew after the first round after defaulting their match with City. Newton and Maritime withdrew from the competition after 2 rounds. At the time the Maritime team was in fact Post & Telegraph, but their club became affiliated with the Maritime Football Club mid season.

Team	Pld	W	D	L	B	F	A	Pts
City Rovers	9	7	2	0	1	118	5	16
Richmond Rovers A	9	7	0	2	0	55	21	14
Manukau	8	5	1	2	0	69	25	11
Ponsonby United A	6	3	0	3	0	47	34	6
North Shore Albions	5	1	1	3	0	10	14	3
Otahuhu Rovers	5	1	0	4	0	24	29	2
Maritime (Post and Telegraph)	5	1	0	4	0	11	68	2
Ponsonby United B	2	0	0	2	0	3	53	0
Northcote & Birkenhead Ramblers	4	0	0	4	0	2	90	0
Richmond Rovers B	0	0	0	0	0	0	0	0

=== Sixth grade ===
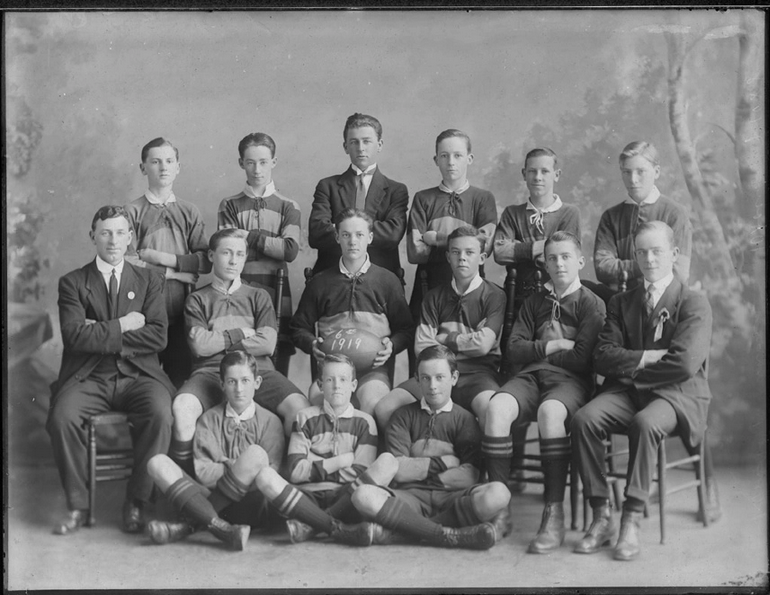
The Ponsonby United 6th grade side.

Ponsonby United were one competition point ahead of City when they then beat them 7-3 in the curtain-raiser to the 3rd test between New Zealand and Australia. This was the penultimate round and sealed the championship for Ponsonby. Sunnyside withdrew after 2 rounds, while Manukau withdrew after 11 rounds.

Team	Pld	W	D	L	B	F	A	Pts
Ponsonby United	14	11	1	2	1	71	40	23
City Rovers	11	10	0	1	0	85	27	10
North Shore Albions	7	2	1	4	1	38	11	5
Sunnyside	1	1	0	0	1	15	5	2
Richmond Rovers	4	0	0	4	0	3	15	0
Maritime (Post and Telegraph)	7	0	0	7	0	5	88	0
Manukau	5	0	0	5	0	10	41	0

== Other club matches ==
=== Benefit match for Albert Asher ===
A match was played on 27 September between Maritime (though the team included members of the Marist side including Neville St George, and City Rovers with the proceeds going to the benefit of Mr. Opai Asher, a league veteran who was incapacitated as the result of an accident. A match was also played between the Auckland Star and The New Zealand Herald. It was won 23 points to 5 by the Star.

27 September	Maritime XIII	19–13	City	Victoria Park 1
3:00	Try: Neville St George 3, Arthur Sutton, Eric Grey; Con: Clifford Grey, George Davidson		Try: Cole, J Duggan, Maurice Wetherill; Con: Maurice Wetherill 2	Referee: E Dempsey

=== St Johns benefit match ===
To end the season a rugby union and rugby league match was played at the Auckland Domain for the benefit of the St. John Ambulance Brigade, whose members regularly attend league and union matches to perform first aid to injured players. The rugby league match was between City and Ponsonby, and was won by City 13–10. Ben Davidson made his debut for City Rovers and scored 2 tries in what was to be a prolific try scoring career for City and later Wigan. It is likely that the Cooke who kicked a goal for Ponsonby was Bert Cooke, the famous All Black of the future. He had played junior rugby league for the Telegraph Messengers in 1917 and 1918 before they amalgamated with Maritime in 1919. The club had been affiliated with Ponsonby prior to this. He switched to rugby union the following year.

4 October	City	13–10	Ponsonby	Auckland Domain
3:00	Try: Tate, Ben Davidson 2 Con: Bill Davidson; Pen: Bill Davidson		Try: Thomas McClymont, Sam Lowrie; Con: Thomas McClymont, Bert Cooke	Referee: John Eddowes

=== Maritime team tour ===
In Mid October the Maritime senior team embarked on an end of season tour to Hawkes Bay on board the S.S. Arahura. They played Petane and Ahuriri and had two comfortable victories. Ahuriri had won the Vigor Brown Shield and the Charity Cup and the match was reportedly played in front of a large crowd. Their touring team was G.H. White, F. Avery, Bert Avery, George Cargill, George Paki, Harry Francis, Eric Grey, Clifford Grey, R. Hunt, Arthur Sutton, W. Lusty, C. Wilkie, Eric McGregor, Dougie McGregor, B. Shera, P. O'Brien, J. Brien, W. Miller, E Roberts, John Sutton, and W. Liversidge. The side was strengthened by some players from other sides including George Paki and Harry Francis of City. After their return they travelled to Thames on 18 October to play in a series of exhibition matches along with the Richmond club though the results are unknown.

9 October	Petane	0–32	Maritime	McLean Park, Napier
3:00			Try: Dougie McGregor, Eric McGregor, Arthur Sutton 2, Eric Grey 2, Unknown x 2 Con: Eric McGregor, Harry Francis, Unknown 2

11 October	Ahuriri	3–37	Maritime	McLean Park, Napier
3:00	Try: Unknown x 1		Try: Clifford Grey 3, Arthur Sutton 2, Dougie McGregor 2, B Shearer, Eric McGregor; Con: B Shearer, Dougie McGregor 2, Harry Francis, Herb Lunn

15 October	Taradale	3–31	Maritime	Taradale
3:00

== Representative fixtures ==
On 14 May the selectors (R Benson, Harold Rowe, and A Powell) conducted a trial match between Auckland A and B teams to help choose both an Auckland and New Zealand team. The B team won the match by 15 points to 14. The first representative fixture of the season was a match played against the New Zealand team which was preparing to depart for their tour of Australia. The New Zealand team won 25–19 at the Auckland Domain in front of 8,000. On Friday, 19 July Auckland played a match at the Auckland Domain with a Returned Soldiers team as part of a “Peace Day” sports celebration involving sports from several different codes. Although the Peace Day celebrations ran over 3 days.

On 23 August Auckland played against a team composed of available members of the New Zealand team which had toured Australia earlier in the year. The Auckland team was composed of Auckland players who remained so in essence was largely a ‘B’ team. The match was played at Victoria Park and resulted in a high scoring win to the ‘NZ’ team 45–30.

Then on 20 September, Auckland played against the touring Australian side and were well defeated by 32 points to 8. The match was played at the Auckland Domain in front of 18,000 spectators.

=== Auckland v Rest of New Zealand ===
24 May	Auckland	19–25	Rest of New Zealand	Auckland Domain
3:00	Try: George Davidson 2 (incl. penalty try), A Sutton, Robert Clark, Pullan; Con: Harry Francis, Phil Castles		Try: Bill Davidson, Karl Ifwersen 3, Archie Waddell; Con: Karl Ifwersen 3 Pen: Karl Ifwersen 2	Attendance: 8000; Referee: A Ball

=== Auckland v Returned Soldiers ===
19 July	Auckland	24–26	Returned Soldiers	Auckland Domain
3:00	Try: George Davidson 2, George Iles 2, Eric McGregor, Unknown x 1 Con: George Davidson, Unknown x 2		Try: C Nicholson, John Lang, Horace Neal, A Thomas, Bert Avery, Unknown x 3 Con: Unknown x 1	Referee: A Ball

=== Auckland v Hawke's Bay (Northern Union C.C.) ===
9 August	Auckland	38–13	Hawkes Bay	Eden Park
3:00	Try: George Iles 2, Craddock Dufty, Dougie McGregor, Tom Haddon 3, George Davidson; Con: Craddock Dufty 7		Try: J Atwood, Con McCarthy, G Jackson; Con: G Jackson; Pen: Con McCarthy	Attendance: 9,000; Referee: Archie Ferguson

=== Auckland v New Zealand touring team ===
New Zealand was playing a test match against the touring Australian side so as a way to select a team for Auckland for their upcoming match against Australia the selectors decided to play a match between New Zealand players who had toured Australia recently but weren't selected for the test side, and remaining Auckland players. George Yardley, playing in the forwards for Auckland broke his leg after he and Ivan Stewart of New Zealand both kicked at the ball and Stewart's foot collected Yardley between the knee and the ankle, breaking his tibia. Bob Mitchell, who was originally named to play for Auckland in fact turned out for New Zealand and scored one of their tries.

23 August	Auckland	30–45	New Zealand Touring Team	Victoria Park 1
3:00	Try: Eric McGregor, Leonard Newdick, George Yardley, S.B. Delaney 2, G Cargill, Albert Ivil, Unknown x 1 Con: Eric McGregor, Harry Francis, S.B. Delaney		Try: Dougie McGregor 2, Thomas McClymont 2, Bob Mitchell, Bill Cloke, Jim Rukutai, Wally Somers 2, Unknown x 2 Con: Bill Davidson 2, Thomas McClymont, Bert Laing 2, Unknown x 1	Attendance: 6,500; Referee: T Hill

=== Auckland v Australia ===
The Auckland team was coached by Harold Rowe who had played 44 matches for New Zealand from 1907 to 1909 and 33 games for Leeds in the 1909/10 season. They went away for a weeks training prior to meeting the Australian side however it made little difference as they were well beaten.

20 September	Auckland	8–32	Australia	Auckland Domain
3:00	Try: Bill Davidson, Bert Avery; Pen: Karl Ifwersen		Try: Les Cubitt 2, Frank Burge 4, Herbert Gilbert 2 Con: Charles Fraser 2, Ray Norman 2	Attendance: 18,000; Referee: A Ball

=== Auckland representative matches played and scorers ===
No	Name	Club Team	Play	Tries	Con	Pen	Points
1	Craddock Dufty	Newton	1	1	7	0	17
3	George Davidson	Maritime	5	5	1	0	17
4	George Iles	Newton	3	4	0	0	12
5	Tom Haddon	City	1	3	0	0	9
6	S B Delaney	Maritime	1	2	1	0	8
6	Eric McGregor	Ponsonby	2	2	1	0	8
8	Harry Francis	City	3	0	2	0	4
9	Arthur Sutton	Maritime	1	1	0	0	3
9	Robert Clark	City	1	1	0	0	3
9	A Pullen	North Shore	1	1	0	0	3
9	Bob Mitchell	Grafton*	4	1	0	0	3
9	Leonard Newdick	Newton	2	1	0	0	3
9	Dougie McGregor	Grafton	2	1	0	0	3
9	Bert Avery	Maritime	2	1	0	0	3
9	George Yardley	Maritime	1	1	0	0	3
9	George Cargill	Maritime	1	1	0	0	3
9	Albert Edwin Ivil	Newton	1	1	0	0	3
9	Bill Davidson	City	1	1	0	0	3
19	Phil Castle	Newton	2	0	1	0	2
19	Karl Ifwersen	Grafton	1	0	0	1	2
20	Jack Keenan	Newton	3	0	0	0	0
20	Frank Delgrosso	Ponsonby	4	0	0	0	0
20	Sam Lowrie	Ponsonby	3	0	0	0	0
20	Jimmy (Sonny) Hing	Marist	2	0	0	0	0
20	Ernie Bailey	North Shore	2	0	0	0	0
20	A Cross	Maritime	1	0	0	0	0
20	Vic Thomas	City	1	0	0	0	0
20	Nelson Bass	Newton	2	0	0	0	0
20	Ernie Herring	Grafton	1	0	0	0	0
20	Laurie Cadman	Ponsonby	1	0	0	0	0
20	Harry Wynn	City	1	0	0	0	0
20	Bert Laing	City	1	0	0	0	0
20	Horace Neal	Ponsonby	1	0	0	0	0
20	Keith Helander	North Shore	1	0	0	0	0
20	Arthur Matthews	North Shore	1	0	0	0	0
20	Thomas McClymont	Ponsonby	1	0	0	0	0
20	Ivan Stewart	City	1	0	0	0	0
20	Billy Ghent	Grafton	1	0	0	0	0
20	Stan Walters	North Shore	1	0	0	0	0
20	Bill Williams	Newton	1	0	0	0	0
20	George Paki	City	1	0	0	0	0

- Bob Mitchell transferred to Marist during the season after his Grafton Athletic side began defaulting games.
