= Horace Neal =

New Zealand international rugby league player

Personal information
- Full name: Horace Richard Neal
- Born: 6 April 1896 Newton, Auckland, New Zealand
- Died: 7 November 1951 (aged 55) Princes Wharf, Auckland, New Zealand

Playing information
- Height: 165.1 cm (5 ft 5.0 in)
- Weight: 61.69 kg (9 st 10.0 lb)
- Position: Halfback
Club
Years	Team	Pld	T	G	FG	P
1919–20	Ponsonby United	11	1	0	0	3
1920	Maritime	1	0	0	0	0
1920	Grafton Athletic	2	1	0	0	3
1921	Maritime	2	0	0	0	0
1922	Ponsonby United	8	0	0	0	0
	Total	24	2	0	0	6
Representative
Years	Team	Pld	T	G	FG	P
1919	Returned Soldiers	1	1	0	0	3
1919	Auckland	1	0	0	0	0
1919	New Zealand	1	0	0	0	0
- Source: As of 16 September 2021

Horace Neal was a rugby league player who represented New Zealand in one test match in 1919 against Australia at halfback. In the process he became the 128th player to represent New Zealand. He also played one match for the Auckland representative side as well as playing for the Ponsonby United, Maritime, and Grafton Athletic clubs from 1913 to 1922. Horace Neal also served in the New Zealand Expeditionary Force during World War I.

== Early life ==
Horace Richard Neal was born on 6 April 1896, while his parents were living on Randolph Street, Newton, Auckland. His parents were Adelaide Victoria Neal (née Cantell) (1870-1952), and William Neal (1868-1943). Adelaide was born in 1870 in London, England, while William was born in 1868 in Alford, Lincolnshire, England. Horace had 7 siblings: Priscilla Jane (b.1892), Archibald William (b.1894), Herbert Henry (b.1898), Roy Samuel (b.1900), Richard (b.1901), Daniel (b.1901), Richard Emanuel (b.1904), and Jane Adelaide (b.1906).

== World War I ==
On 18 October 1915, Horace and his brother Archibald were part of 52 recruits who were called up to "proceed to Wellington" by train to join the New Zealand Rifle Brigade (Earl of Liverpool's Own). They were part of the 4th Battalion, D Company. At the time of their recruitment they were living at 2 Harcourt Street in Grey Lynn. On the Nominal Roll it was stated that Archibald was a seaman and Horace was a storeman. Horace was employed by Samuel Parker Ltd at the time. They were a galvanised iron and sheet metal works company based on Wellesley Street in central Auckland.

Horace trained at Trentham Military Camp for 178 days before embarking on 5 February 1916, from Wellington to Egypt. Both he and brother Archibald were aboard the Mokoia ship. During his service overseas Horace spent time in Egypt in 1916, and joined the Egyptian Expeditionary Force in the same year. On 7 April he embarked for France from Alexandria in Egypt. He then spent the remainder of 1916, and all of 1917 and 1918 fighting in France with periods of time in England resting or recovering from illness. He was a Lance Corporal for the majority of his service. While on active service Neal was deducted 10 days pay on 10 November 1916, for "insolence and using obscene language" in the field, and on another occasion was reported as being "absent without reason from 2pm, 6.8.17 until 2pm, 20.8.17" and lost 15 days pay. In April 1918 Neal marched into camp at Étaples and joined his company. On 28 October 1918, he was transferred to hospital and admitted to the general hospital at Rouen on 11 September suffering from influenza. He was later declared unfit for service after contracting dysentery and suffering from trench fever while on active service. It was thought that he would be unfit for 12 months and so he was sent back to New Zealand, departing Liverpool on board the S.S. Oxfordshire on 19 December 1918. Although the war was largely over by this point anyway. Neal arrived back in New Zealand on 1 February 1919. After returning Neal was discharged on 11 April 1919 and gave his intended address as 41 Edendale Road, Mt Eden. He was awarded the British War Medal on 22 June 1921, and the Victory Medal on 23 February 1922.

== Rugby league playing career ==
=== Ponsonby United ===
Prior to joining the war effort Neal was a Ponsonby United rugby league junior. He played in their 4th grade teams from 1913 to 1915 (aged 17 to 19 through this period). Following his return to New Zealand after the war Neal began playing for the Ponsonby senior side early in the 1919 season. His height and weight when he enlisted were recorded as 1.65m and 62 kg respectively so unsurprisingly he was playing in the halfback position alongside the brilliant young Frank Delgrosso who was also in his debut season in the senior side at first five eighth and fullback. In a round 5 match on 7 June for Ponsonby against Maritime, which Ponsonby won 15-6, it was reported that "Neal made a commendable showing at halfback". The match was played before a crowd of 5,000 at Victoria Park. A week later at the same venue he scored a try against City Rovers before 7,000 spectators who witnessed Ponsonby win 18-13. His try came after he "was prominent in several attacking movements, and eventually from a good opening made a fine run, and scored near the corner". On 21 June on a "heavy" Auckland Domain surface Neal had to be taken off injured in their match with Newton Rangers. The Auckland Star reported that he had put his "best effort forward" while the Observer said "little Neal, Ponsonby's half-back, is to be complimented". In a 19-3 round 8 win over Newton he was said to be "more adroit and resourceful than the half-back who opposed him, and consequently the Ponsonby back division was able to monopolise the attack". Against City a week later Neal had another strong game in a crucial 7-4 win before 6,000 at Victoria Park. City had a slight advantage in the forward play but it was "more than outweighed by the handle Neal's work behind the scrum gave to Ponsonby", where he gave "several pretty openings to his backs". The New Zealand Herald said he was "always about and got the ball away in good style. He was of great assistance to his side". The Observer said "Neal for Ponsonby was as nippy and dodgy as of yore, and set his backs going on many occasions".

On 12 July Neal played in Ponsonby's 3-3 draw with Maritime which secured Ponsonby the 1919 Myers Cup for winning the first grade championship. It was their third consecutive title after winning for the first ever time in 1917. He was said to have been "prominent" in the greasy conditions. The Auckland Star said "Neal, the little junior who has not long come up from [the] juniors, is a player the team will do well to hold on to".

=== Returned Soldiers, and Auckland selection ===
Following Ponsonby's championship winning match Neal was selected for the Returned Soldiers side to play against Auckland at the Auckland Domain as part of the Peace Day celebrations (which were in fact spread over 3 days). He was chosen to play halfback with James Hing and John Lang partnering him in the five eighths positions. Before a crowd estimated at 20,000 the Returned Soldiers won the match by 26 to 24. The day of their match also saw a rugby game between the Returned Soldiers and Auckland (coincidentally also won 26-24 for the Soldiers), a football match between the "Diggers" and Auckland, and a trial hockey game between Auckland and The Rest. Neal scored the Soldiers first try of the game after a "passing bout" saw him score under the posts.

On 25 July Horace was back in the jersey of Ponsonby in a round 1 Roope Rooster match with Newton Rangers. The match was marred by Ponsonby spectators encroaching on the field in protest at the referee and after refusing to move off the field the match was called off with Ponsonby trailing 8-10. It was reported that Neal "got the ball away a little slicker" than his opposite, Jack Keenan, on the Newton side who he had been up against in the match against Auckland also. Following the game he was chosen at halfback with Bert Laing at standoff in the side to play Hawke's Bay at the Auckland Domain. Unfortunately the weather was particularly bad and the Hawke's Bay side were held up on board the Mokoia by rough seas at Gisborne so the match was postponed. Instead a replay of Ponsonby's called off match with Newton was played. Newton won the game 12-10 to eliminate Ponsonby from the knockout competition with 8,000 in attendance. Neal was involved in many of his sides attacking movements. The NZ Herald said that he did "clean work ... behind the pack" and "played his usual fine game...[feeding] his backs well and played cleverly, both in attack and defence".

The match between Auckland and Hawke's Bay was rearranged for 9 August and was played at Eden Park. There were 9,000 people on hand to see Auckland run out comfortable 38-13 victors. Neal was involved in many attacking movements and "got the ball well away from the scrum, and was always about to take part in a passing movement". In a critique of the match the Auckland Star said that "Neal is a good boy, but he is inclined to that machinery-work for which Ponsonby halves have for quite a while been notorious". The Observer said that "Neal, at half-back, set the machine going in good style, and on his form this season will be in the running for a game against the Australians".

=== New Zealand appearance ===
At noon on 15 August Horace Neal was named to play in the first test against the touring Australian side at the Basin Reserve in Wellington. Neal along with the other Auckland-based players sailed on the Rarawa on the Monday so that they could prepare during the remainder of the week for the match. He had been picked to play in the halves in the "inside half" position with John Lang at "outside half".

New Zealand was to lose the test 44-21 before 7,000 spectators though the score line was much closer for most of the match with New Zealand only trailing 23-17 at one point in the second half. Neal was slightly concussed early in the second half which "affected his subsequent play". It occurred after he had "stemmed a rush... and play ceased until he was able to resume". Earlier in the match he had thrown an interception after he had "worked the blindside" to Harold Horder who "side-stepping, beat seven men and scored". At halftime Neal had switched positions with Lang before his injury happened. After the concussion the Dominion reported that he was "practically useless". They also noted that early in the first half "wild passing" by him "spoilt several good opportunities". Later on however he saved a try when he tackled Gilbert when he "was nearly over". He was also involved in a passing bout with Karl Ifwersen and George Bradley which nearly took New Zealand to the line when the score was 23-17 to the visitors. And again in the final moments of the match he was involved in an attack with Bill Scott and Alec Morris before the final whistle sounded. It was reported in the Evening Press that Neal required medical attention after the match. For the second test to be played in Christchurch Neal was named in the reserves with the selectors choosing Mike Pollock at inside halfback. The first test was to be Neal's last match of the 1919 season.

=== Transfer to Maritime and Grafton Athletic ===
Horace Neal began the 1920 season named in the Ponsonby side to play Marist Old Boys. However less than two weeks later he had a transfer granted by Auckland Rugby League to Maritime seniors. He was then named in their side to play Marist for 15 May. Somewhat surprisingly Neal transferred again during the following week, this time to Grafton Athletic. On 19 June it was reported that Neal had been out injured as he "had his shoulder broken", though it was not stated when or how this had happened. The injury cannot have been as serious as it sounded as he was back playing 7 days later on the 26th when Grafton played against his former club Ponsonby. He was "doing well until from an order by the referee he was compelled to leave the field", being sent off. This appears to have been his final appearance of the season as he was not named in team lineups or mentioned in any match reports again.

In 1921 he transferred once more, back to Maritime. He played in matches for them against City Rovers and Fire Brigade which was his previous club, Grafton Athletic's new name. He was not named in their side for the remainder of the year.

=== Return to Ponsonby and retirement ===
The 1922 season saw Neal once again back playing for Ponsonby. He played 8 matches for them and was said to be "in excellent form, and did great work for his side". He was not reported to have played any more beyond a 29 July match against Devonport United.

== Personal life ==
In the 1919 census he was listed as a plumber and living at 1 Harcourt Street, Grey Lynn.

In October, 1922 it was reported that he had been the victim of an assault in a city motel in Auckland. It was said that "following on an argument in a city motel on Saturday afternoon, a man named Horace Richard Neal sustained a blackened optic, with the result that James A. Lee (24) was charged ... with assault". Neal was appearing before the court with a heavily bandaged eye and said that Lee "struck him without provocation". The Justice of the Peace, Mr. Edmond George Twohill said "I know about you Lee boys,... you have a penchant for going around the hotels, looking for drunken men..." to fight. Lee was subsequently fined £5.

Horace listed himself as a Methodist on his enlistment papers for World War 1. On 29 June 1921, he married Dorothy Madge Baker at St Stephens Church on Khyber Pass Road. On 26 May 1922, they had a son, Desmond Francis Neal. They had a daughter, Daphne May Neal (Tomkins) in 1923, and another son, William Thomas Neal in 1924, followed by three more daughters Betty Marguerite Neal, Colleen Neal, and Robyn Beryl Neal in December 1926.

From 1928 to 1949 he was listed as being a "sugar worker" on the census records.

In 1943 Neal was living in Birkenhead when his eldest son Desmond became engaged to Gwenyth Blomfield.

Horace died on 7 November 1951, after falling from a roof at 55 Princes Wharf on the Auckland waterfront. He was a Harbour Board Employee at the time and was living at 39 Rawene Road, Birkenhead. He was buried at Waikumete Cemetery, Glen Eden, Auckland, in Soldiers Plot k13.6 on 9 November 1951.
