= Keith Helander =

NZ international rugby league footballer

Personal information
- Full name: Keith Ervid Helander
- Born: 28 March 1892; New Zealand
- Died: 9 March 1960 (aged 67)

Playing information
- Weight: 76.7 kg (12 st 1 lb)

Rugby league
- Position: Lock
Club
Years	Team	Pld	T	G	FG	P
1919–21	North Shore Albions	23	2	0	0	6
Representative
Years	Team	Pld	T	G	FG	P
1919	Returned Soldiers	1	0	0	0	0
1919	Auckland	1	0	0	0	0
1919	New Zealand	1	0	0	0	0

Rugby union
Club
Years	Team	Pld	T	G	FG	P
1921–25	Grafton		7	0	0	21
Representative
Years	Team	Pld	T	G	FG	P
1921–23	Auckland	11	3	0	0	9

Keith Ervid Helander (28 March 1892 – 9 March 1960) was a New Zealand rugby league player. He played one test for the Kiwis in 1919 against Australia, becoming the 135th player for the national side, in addition to one game for Auckland. In late 1921 he switched codes to Rugby Union and represented Auckland. Helander fought for New Zealand in World War 1.

== Early life ==
Keith Helander was born in Auckland on 28 March 1892, the youngest child of Ellen and Charles Helander, a ship's captain. He had seven siblings, one brother (Charles), and six sisters (Mabel, Ethel, Nellie, Winifred, Alfreda, and Vera). Keith Helander was born six weeks after the death of his father in an accident at sea. Charles was captaining the Welcome, which was making its way to Sydney Harbour when he was swept overboard and lost in heavy seas off the coast. At the time of his death his family was living in Papakura. When Helander enlisted in the war effort in 1917 he was working as a Warehouseman for Brown Barrett and was living in Trafalgar Street, Onehunga

== War ==
Helander enlisted in the army during World War I on 19 March 1917. He spent 152 days of service in New Zealand before serving for one year and 237 days in Western Europe. He was a part of the 2nd Auckland Infantry Regiment. Helander returned to Auckland on the Port Melbourne steamer in March 1919. He was awarded the British War Medal and the Victory Medal. After returning from the war he began living in Avon Street in Parnell, Auckland.

== Playing career ==
=== Rugby league ===
Helander began playing rugby league for the North Shore Albions in the Auckland Rugby League competition within two months of his return from the war. He was to play with them for 3 seasons. In a June match against Marist Old Boys on the Auckland Domain Helander scored a rare try. “going across at the corner” early in the match, with North Shore winning by 13 points to 8.

The Auckland Rugby League arranged for a match to be played between Returned Soldiers and the Auckland representative team at the Auckland Domain. The match was part of the Peace Day celebrations for July 20 which also featured athletics and matches in rugby, rugby league, football, and hockey. Coincidentally the Returned Soldiers won both the rugby union and rugby league matches by the identical score of 26–24. Helander played alongside the likes of Craddock Dufty, and against Frank Delgrosso, George Iles, and Sam Lowrie.

Helander was then selected to play for the Auckland representative team for a match at Eden Park against the Hawke's Bay rugby league team. Auckland won the match by 38 points to 13 in front of 9,000 spectators. Helander's teammates included a large number of New Zealand rugby league representatives such as Frank Delgrosso, George Iles, Craddock Dufty, Dougie McGregor, Bert Laing, Horace Neal, Sam Lowrie, Tom Haddon, and Bert Avery, along with Olympic sprinter turned league player George Davidson. The match was for the Northern Union Challenge Cup (now known as the Rugby League Cup).

Helander then made the New Zealand team for his one and only appearance in the Kiwi jersey. He was selected for the second test in the four-match series with Australia. Australia had won the first test comprehensively 44–21 at the Basin Reserve. The second test was played at Sydenham Park in Christchurch. Helander played at lock, wearing the number 13 jersey, replacing his North Shore Albions teammate Stan Walters who had moved into the front row. New Zealand won 26 to 10. He was named in the reserves for the third test at the Auckland Domain but did not play.

In 1920 Helander again turned out for the North Shore Albions, though at the start of the season they had decided to change their name to Devonport United after a merger with the Sunnyside League Football Club. In a drawn match against Ponsonby United (17–17) on the Devonport Domain he scored his second try in a North Shore jersey. The try was described in the Auckland Star where he gained “possession and scored in a good position” with Arthur Matthews converting, and in the Observer as securing the ball “and with a speedy dash got over”.

=== Switch to rugby union ===
In 1921 Helander began the season again playing for Devonport United, however on 23 June at a Management Committee meeting of the New Zealand Rugby Union he sought reinstatement into that code. The fact that it was a reinstatement indicates that he had played the rugby union code prior to the war, though there are no known records of this. The reinstatement was granted and he turned out for the Grafton club almost immediately in the Auckland Rugby Union club competition. He scored a try for them in a match with Grammar School on 30 July. He then played a trial match for selection in an Auckland team to play Thames around the same time. Due to a large number of Grammar and College Rifles players unable to play due to their upcoming match the trial did not go ahead and Helander was picked for the Auckland team. Auckland travelled to Thames and defeated the local side 18–17 on the Parawai Ground in front of an estimated crowd of 3,000, with 300 having made the trip down from Auckland. Helander scored a try, finishing off a passing “movement with a fine score”.

On 27 August, Helandar played in the Auckland Rugby championship final for Grafton against Grammar. The match was drawn 3–3 and was curtain raiser to the second test match between New Zealand and the Springboks, won by the Springboks in front of 35,000 spectators at Eden Park. Three weeks later, the championship final was replayed at Eden Park and this time Grafton won the match 13–8 and were crowned champions. Helander scored the winning try after a “dribbling rush”.

Helander was selected for what could be called his full Auckland debut in a match with Taranaki at Eden Park. He scored a try in a 19–9 victory, running in support of Milliken and scoring near the posts. He had made his debut at the last moment, originally being named in the reserves. Tresize had fallen ill and Nicholas moved into his front row position, and Helander took Nicholas's spot. Helander then was chosen to play for Auckland against Wellington in a Ranfurly Shield match. Wellington won by 27 points to 19, with Helander sustaining an injury during the match which ruled him out of a following Taranaki game.

In 1922, Helander was elected on to the Management Committee of the Grafton club. He continued his occasional try-scoring habit when he “followed up his kick and beating off several attempted tackles scored” against Newton in a 20–9 win. He scored again in an August match against University, scoring under the posts, and even took the kick at goal (which missed).

Helander's representative season was a busy one. He travelled with the Auckland team to Thames and in a match at Parawai lost 9–14. Auckland then played against Thames Valley in Paeroa where they secured an 18–3 win. On their Southern tour they first played Taranaki and won 13–8, with Helander having “led the forwards in many exhilarating stunts, and was a power of strength to his side”. Against South Canterbury, Auckland went down 6 points to 8. Helander was then named to play against Otago, and in a rare instant the newspaper had the weights of all the player. Helander was recorded by the local newspaper as weighing 12 stone, 1 pound (76.7 kg). Otago won the match 11 to 3 in front of 14,000 at Carisbrook with Helander playing alongside Kiwi number 92, Karl Ifwersen. More misery was to come with Canterbury defeating Auckland 21–15 a week later at Lancaster Park with 4,500 watching. Auckland lost again to Wairarapa 15 points to 3 — the first time the two teams had met — with Helander again playing in the pack. Auckland suffered their fifth straight loss with an 11–19 defeat to Wellington, with Helander scoring a “fine try in the second half.

Helander was still playing for Grafton in 1923, and he scored a try against Suburbs at the Avondale Racecourse. It was said that he “was the star forward on the field, [and] scored cleverly in the early part of the game, after beating five of his opponents. He scored again against Grammar Old Boys in a June match In the end-of-season representative games he played for Auckland in a match against Southland which Auckland easily won by 37 points to 3. Helander had been a reserve, but came on for Keene who was injured. He was named in the reserves to play Taranaki, but did not take the field. Helander was named “an emergency” to play against Northland in Whangārei and to play Otago at Eden Park, but did not take the field in either case.

By the start of the 1924 season Helander, now aged 32, was seeing his on-field career begin to wind down. He was still turning out the play for the Grafton Rugby club but he was becoming more active for them off the field. In the 1924 annual general meeting he was elected to be deputy club captain, was in the Management Committee, and was a selector for the senior team (which he was still playing in). He scored the opening try for them against Marist in a match on Victoria Park. At the end of the season Helandar played his last ever match for the Grafton senior team. They played a match against Northern Waikato at Pukekohe and lost 3–17. In 1926 he was elected on the management committee for the Grafton club, a position he also held in 1927 along with being a delegate to the Auckland Rugby Union. In 1928 he was again elected to the committee, however this appears to be the last year in which he was formally involved with the Grafton Club.

== Personal life ==
Keith Helandar married Mary Ada (surname unknown) in 1926. Mary gave birth to their first child, a daughter named Judith, on 22 January 1927. They were living in Orakei Road in Remuera at the time. They had a son, David Keith, the following year. Mary was an assistant mistress at Remuera School in Auckland during the Second World War.

== Death ==
Keith Helander died on 9 March 1960, aged 68. He was living in Napier at the time, and was survived by his wife. Mary died in 1965, also aged 68.
