= Archie Waddell =

New Zealand international rugby league & union player

Personal information
- Full name: Archibald Thomas Waddell
- Born: 4 September 1886 Napier, New Zealand
- Died: 2 November 1972 (aged 86) Gisborne, New Zealand

Playing information
- Height: 183 cm (6 ft 0 in)
- Weight: 89 kg (14 st 0 lb)

Rugby union
Club
| Years | Team | Pld | T | G | FG | P |
|---|---|---|---|---|---|---|
| 1906 | Ahuriri |
| 1908–09 | City (ARU) |
| | Total | 0 | 0 | 0 | 0 | 0 |
Representative
| Years | Team | Pld | T | G | FG | P |
| 1907 | Napier (sub-union team) | 1 | 0 | 0 | 0 | 0 |
| 1907 | Hawke's Bay | 1 | 0 | 0 | 0 | 0 |
| 1909 | Auckland | 6 | 0 | 0 | 0 | 0 |
| 1909 | North Island | 1 | 0 | 0 | 0 | 0 |

Rugby league
- Position: Second-row
Club
| Years | Team | Pld | T | G | FG | P |
|---|---|---|---|---|---|---|
| 1910–14 | St Helens | 97 | 18 | 0 | 0 | 54 |
| 1919 | North Shore Albions (ARL) | 2 | 1 | 0 | 0 | 3 |
| | Total | 99 | 19 | 0 | 0 | 57 |
Representative
| Years | Team | Pld | T | G | FG | P |
| 1919 | New Zealand | 7 | 1 | 0 | 0 | 3 |

Archibald Thomas Waddell (4 September 1886 – 2 November 1972) was a New Zealand rugby league player originally from Hawke's Bay. He was selected for the New Zealand tour of Australia in 1919 and became Kiwi number 121 in the process.

== Early life ==
Archie Waddell grew up in Hawke's Bay. When he was just 8 months old his father was killed in a boating accident. The Northumberland launch which was working at Napier, Port was stranded in a severe gale at anchor on 11 May 1887 and was unable to berth. The Union Company's steam launch, Boojum, was sent out to help but was capsized and thrown on to Petane Beach. Waddell's father along with 2 other men were killed. Waddell had 4 older sisters and in May 1904 he 'gave away' his sister at her wedding to Mr J. P. Fortune at St Patrick's Church in Napier. After Waddell finished his playing days he moved back to the Hawke's Bay Region and resided in Patutahi.

== Playing career ==
Waddell was originally a rugby player. He represented the Napier sub union team against Hastings on August 19 in a 6–3 win. He then made his debut for Hawke's Bay against Auckland on September 11 at the Recreation Ground in front of "the largest attendance ever seen at a football match on the ground". Hawke's Bay won by 10 points to nil with a 21 year old Waddell playing in the forwards.

Waddell then moved to Auckland in 1908. He joined the City club in the Auckland Rugby competition and played for them in 1908 and 1909. Rugby league in Auckland was in its absolute infancy in 1908 with just a handful of exhibition games being played. In 1908 he was selected to play for the Auckland B rugby team against Waikato which was a curtain raiser to the Auckland v British Lions match. Auckland B lost the match by 9 points to 6. A week later Waddell made his full debut for Auckland against Franklin. Auckland won 12 points to 0 and the match was a curtain-raiser to the third test between New Zealand and Britain. He played again for Auckland against Thames in August. On August 25, 1909 Waddell played for the North Island in their annual fixture with the South Island. The match was played at Athletic Park in front of 7000 spectators. The North Island lost the match 11–19.

In March 1910 Waddell moved back to Napier to spend time with friends and family before travelling to the Australia and South Africa then on to England. Waddell was a plumber by trade and hoped “to gain much experience in his trade while away. He was also aiming to play there. After arriving in England Waddell was signed by the St Helens Rugby League Club. While playing there Waddell was said to have a tobacconist’s business in St Helens. He was to play for them for five years until his career was interrupted by the outbreak of World War I. It is thought that his friend Jum Turtill persuaded Waddell to stay in England and play league.

Waddell's debut came in a match on September 3, 1910 against Oldham where he scored a try in a 16–5 victory “which delighted the Knowsley Road crowd. During his time with St Helens he made 97 appearances and scored 18 tries, for 54 points. After Waddell had been injured at Gallipoli he spent some time recovering in England. He was interviewed by the St Helens Newspaper and Advertiser on Friday, February 25, 1916 and said “I don’t think I shall play football again, but I shall go to see the boys on Saturday when they play Barrow”.

While playing for St Helens Waddell along with Turtill organised charity matches in town as part of the Chief Constable's Clog and Stocking Fund which was an organisation which provided clothes for children in need. The teams were known as Turtill's Toddlers and Waddell's Warriors and consisted of well known local business men and personalities.

In 1916 Waddell returned to New Zealand and eventually returned to the playing field, playing 2 matches in the 1919 season for the North Shore Albions in the Auckland Rugby League competition. He was then selected to play for the New Zealand team on their tour of Australia.

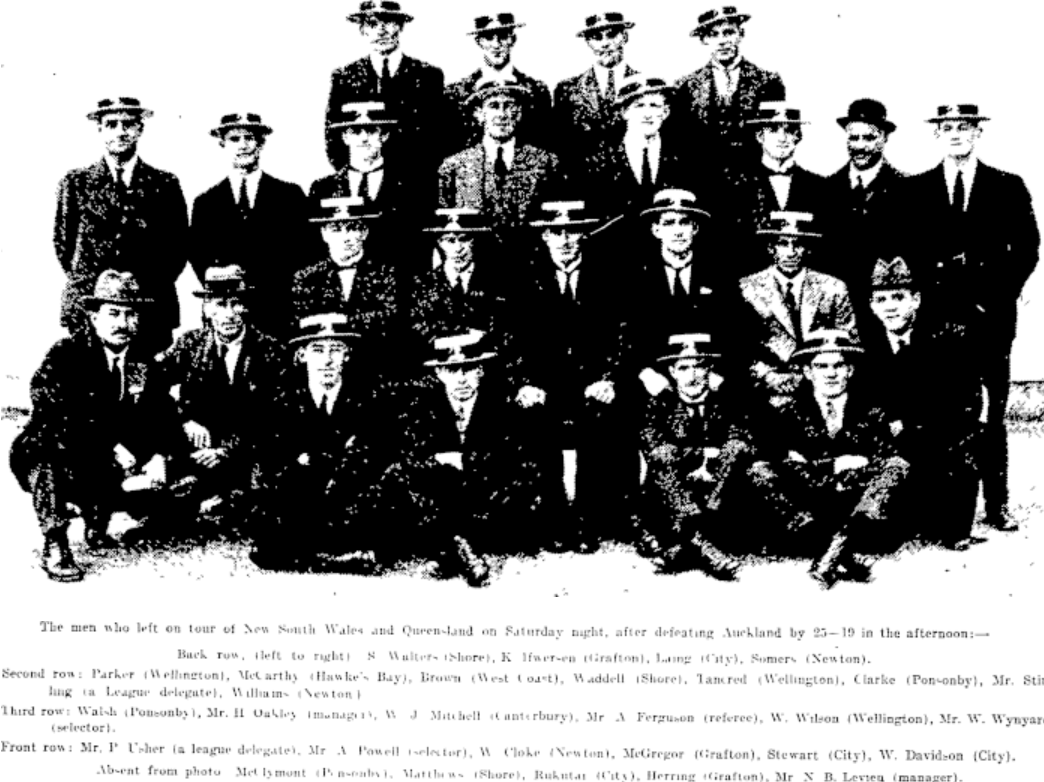
The 1919 New Zealand team to tour New South Wales and Queensland. Waddell is standing in the 3rd row, 4th from the left.

He made his New Zealand debut in the match against Auckland prior to their departure for Australia scoring a try in a 25-19 win. Waddell played in 6 of the 11 matches on the tour with his first appearance being in a 23–13 win over Tamworth on July 11, playing in the second row. He played again against Northern Division 3 days later in an 11–8 victory in front of 5,000 people at the Newcastle Showgrounds. His next match was against Ipswich which saw New Zealand win again by 11 points to 8 with 3,000 in attendance at the North Ipswich Reserve. Waddell tasted defeat for the first time when he was part of the side that went down 13–26 to the Queensland team in front of a crowd of 11,146 at Davies Park in Brisbane. Waddell played in the front row in this match. One week later against the same opponents with a crowd of 12,335 present New Zealand again lost 13–16. He rounded off the tour playing in the 42–12 thrashing of Toowoomba on July 19 meaning he personally had played in 4 wins and two defeats.

== World War I ==
After the outbreak of war in 1914 Mr. W. Dervan received a letter from Billy Curran, an ex Marist Old Boys rugby, and Newton rugby league player, which stated that Waddell along with Lance Todd and P Thomas had joined the New Zealand Expeditionary Force. Indeed, Waddell had joined the war effort and was part of a group of 200 New Zealanders who volunteered in London. He was listed as being from Waipu, though this is more likely a misspelling of Waiapu where the Waiapu Cathedral stands. They were to join the force of 8000 who had been sent from New Zealand and had gone into camp at Bulford, on Salisbury Plain in late November, 1914. He went to Egypt with the New Zealand Forces and was wounded at Gallipoli. Waddell got through the landing safely but weeks later a high explosive shell landed near him and the concussion “left him senseless and with hearing partially gone”. He recovered somewhat and managed to stay on the peninsula for another four months before “giddiness and deafness caused by the explosion had their effect, and he was shipped off on the Acquitania to hospital in England”. He was also suffering from dysentery. In May 1916 he was invalided home from England. Later in the year he was in Auckland and described himself as quite deaf in one ear, and that he suffers occasional attacks of giddiness.

== Death ==
Following his playing career Waddell moved back to the Poverty Bay area and was balloted a farm at Patutahi. He died on 2 November 1972 in Gisborne, New Zealand aged 86. Buried at Taruheru Cemetery, Gisborne, alongside his wife Barbara Louise Edith Smith (baptised Louisa Smith), who died 21 August 1963 aged 68 years.
