= Horace Nunn =

NZ international rugby league player & administrator (1891-1957)

Personal information
- Full name: William Horace Nunn
- Born: 8 August 1891; Rockhampton, Queensland, Australia
- Died: 4 February 1957 (aged 65); Wellington, New Zealand

Playing information
- Height: 1.66 m (5 ft 5 1/2 in)
- Weight: 68 kg (149 lb)

Rugby union
- Position: Halfback
Club
Years	Team	Pld	T	G	FG	P
1910–1916	Petone
Representative
Years	Team	Pld	T	G	FG	P
1912–1914	Wellington
1914	North Island

Rugby league
- Position: Stand-off
Club
Years	Team	Pld	T	G	FG	P
1919	Marist Old Boys (ARL)	2	0	1	0	2
1921–1922	Petone	8	5	4	1	25
	Total	10	5	5	1	27
Representative
Years	Team	Pld	T	G	FG	P
1921–1922	Wellington	3	0	0	0	0
1921	New Zealand	3	1	0	0	3

Coaching information
Club
Years	Team	Gms	W	D	L	W%
1923–1924	Hutt RL Club	22	12	1	9	55
1923	Wellington
	Total	22	12	1	9	55

William Horace Nunn (8 August 1891 – 4 February 1957) was a New Zealand rugby footballer who played both rugby union and rugby league, including as a member of the New Zealand national rugby league team in 1921. Enlisting as a private New Zealand Expeditionary Force in 1917 during World War I, Nunn deserted from the Trentham Military Camp, and was sentenced to one year's imprisonment with hard labour.

== Early life ==
Born in Rockhampton, Queensland, Australia in 1891, Nunn emigrated to New Zealand with his parents in about 1903, and worked as an iron moulder in Petone. He played cricket for the Petone club as a batsman and leg-break bowler, and was noted for being a good outfielder with a strong arm.

== Rugby union ==
A "diminutive but nuggety" halfback, Nunn played for the Petone Rugby Club, and represented Wellington at a provincial level from 1912 to 1914, and the North Island in 1914. In 1914, he was controversially omitted from the All Blacks for their tour of Australia, the stated reason being that he had been certified as unfit for military service and could therefore not be considered for selection.

== Rugby league ==
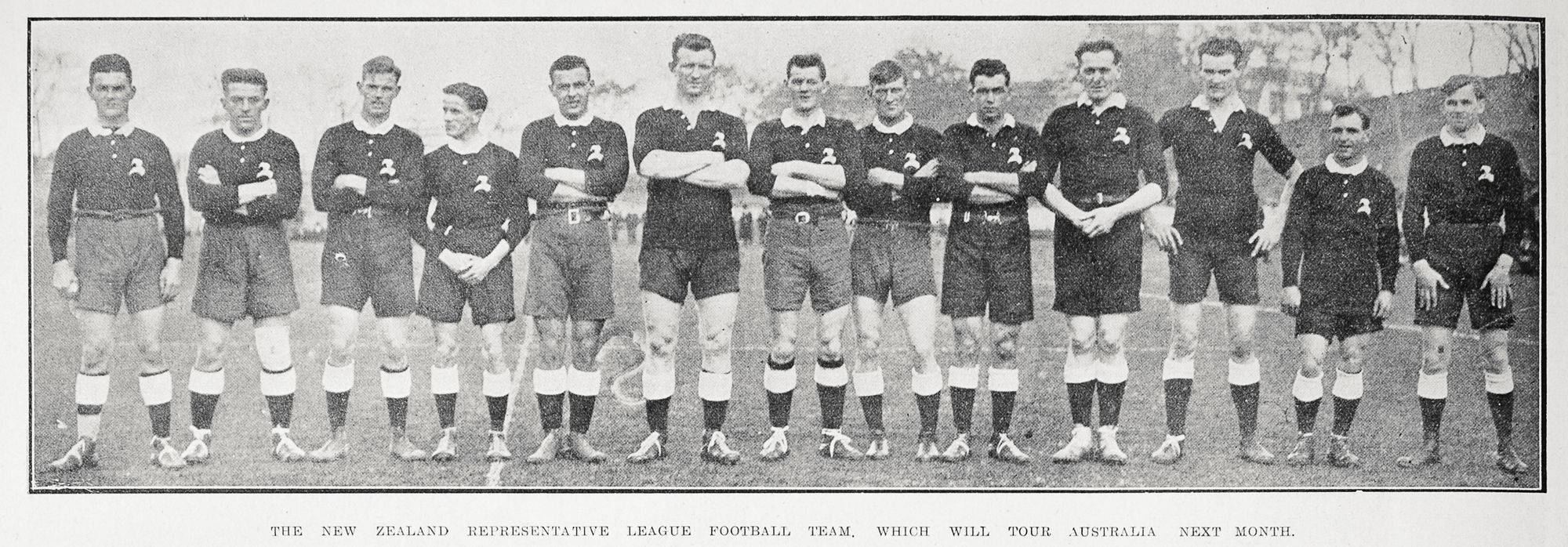
Nunn 2nd from the right in the 'New Zealand' team to play Auckland on 21 May 1921

Nunn played for Wellington, as a stand-off, captaining the side in 1922. In 1923 he began coaching the new Hutt rugby league club, and was appointed as one of the three selectors for the Wellington senior representative side. The Hutt side won the competition in their first year beating Petone who had won for several years by one competition point. The following year they finished 3rd under his tutelage. He also coached the Wellington representative team. In 1926 Nunn was elected as one of 10 vice-presidents of the Wellington Rugby League.

Nunn represented New Zealand on their 1921 tour of Australia, becoming Kiwi number 150.

== World War I ==
Nunn enlisted as a private in F Company, 28th Reinforcements, New Zealand Expeditionary Force in February 1917, but deserted from camp at Trentham in May that year. In 1919 Nunn was listed as one of the country's military defaulters. Arrested in Dunedin in April 1920, he was found guilty by a district court-martial the following month and sentenced to one year's imprisonment with hard labour. If Nunn had been detained during the war, he would have potentially faced a firing squad. Although Nunn had blamed his sport commitments, there were earlier indications of his pacificism as he had been previously fined for failing to attend training parades in 1913.

In 1919 Horace and his brother played for Marist in a Roope Rooster match at the Auckland Domain. In the Marist Memories book produced by the Marist Club for their Golden Jubilee, it was recalled by Bill Glover that the Robinson brothers who played for Marist in that game were in fact the Nunn brothers from Wellington. The story was retold by Glover 50 years later that they were trying to avoid detection from the military police, and gave aliases to the police.

== Personal life ==
After release from prison, Nunn became involved in a paternity case involving Lydia Ann Scott and her son, Howard Phillip Scott. Nunn's visibility as a sportsperson attracted the attentions of the newspapers. Nunn lost the affiliation case. Subsequent DNA testing of the descendants of Lydia Scott has confirmed that Nunn was the child's father.

== Death ==
Nunn died unmarried at a care home in Upper Hutt on 4 February 1957. He is credited in his obituary as one of the founding members of the Upper Hutt Cricket Club.
