= Ernie Herring =

New Zealand rugby league footballer

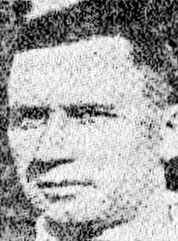

Personal information
- Full name: Ernest Herring
- Born: 28 January 1898 Auckland, New Zealand
- Died: 17 September 1947 (aged 49) Auckland, New Zealand

Playing information
- Height: 178 cm (5 ft 10 in)
- Weight: 91 kg (14 st 5 lb)

Rugby union
Club
Years	Team	Pld	T	G	FG	P
1916	City	6	0	0	0	0
1917	Railways	6	4	0	0	12
	Total	12	4	0	0	12
Representative
Years	Team	Pld	T	G	FG	P
1916–17	Auckland	4	2	0	0	6

Rugby league
- Position: Hooker, Second-row, Loose forward
Club
Years	Team	Pld	T	G	FG	P
1917	Railway (RL)	1	0	0	0	0
1918–19	Grafton Athletic	3	1	0	0	3
1920–21	Maritime	18	6	0	0	18
1921–22	Marist Old Boys	6	3	1	0	11
1922	Fire Brigade	11	2	0	0	6
1923–27	Athletic/Grafton Athletic	51	15	1	0	47
1928	Newton Rangers	2	0	0	0	0
	Total	92	27	2	0	85
Representative
Years	Team	Pld	T	G	FG	P
1918–26	Auckland	7	0	0	0	0
1919–27	New Zealand	46	9	0	0	27
1925–26	North Island	2	3	0	0	9
- As of 19 April 2020

Ernie Herring (28 January 1898 – 17 September 1947) was the 112th player to represent New Zealand at rugby league.

== Early life ==
Ernest Herring was born on 28 January 1898. His parents were Sarah Alice Foster (1867-1956), and Albert Richard Herring (1865-1931). He was their seventh born child of ten. His older siblings were Albert Edgar Frank, Amy Alice Holroyd, George Reginald, Ethel Mabel, Arthur Edwin, and Francis Holroyd, while his younger siblings were Ada Millicent, and Ann Holroyd.

== Playing career ==
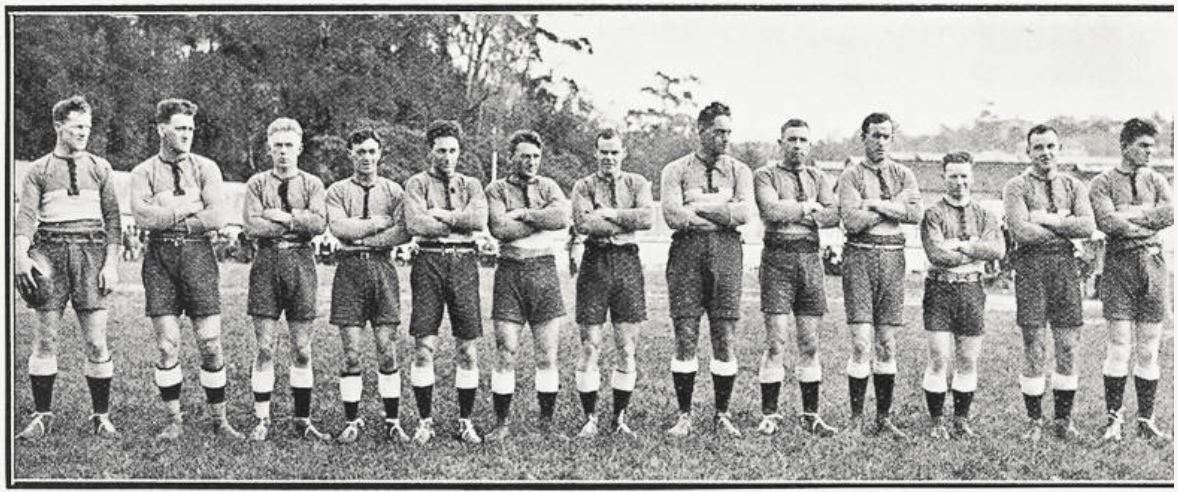
Herring, 5th from right in the Auckland team to play England on July 26, 1924.

Ernie Herring began his career playing rugby union in Auckland. He was a representative of the Railway team which won the Auckland club competition and he also played for Auckland. The Railway team grew disgruntled with the Auckland Rugby Union and played two matches at the end of the season in the rugby league code against Ponsonby and City with Herring playing in those matches. In the following season they joined the rugby league code. In 1918 he switched to the rugby league code and joined the Grafton Athletic senior team in the Auckland Rugby League competition where he played for two seasons before transferring to the Maritime club in 1920. He won the title with Maritime in the 1920 season. They did not secure the win until the final round of the season when they defeated Ponsonby United 26 to 10 with Herring scoring a try, and City Rovers their nearest rivals losing.

He debuted for Auckland in 1918 in their match against Canterbury which was won by 45 points to 9. Then, in just his second season in the code Herring made the New Zealand test team. He was to appear in 19 matches for New Zealand between 1919 and 1927, including 9 tests.

His New Zealand debut was on the tour of Australia when he played in a tour match against Tamworth which New Zealand won by 8 points to 5 with Herring scoring a try. There were no test matches played on the tour which consisted of 11 matches, with Herring playing in 6 of them (Tamworth, Ipswich, Queensland Firsts x 2, Rockhampton, and Toowoomba).

Ernie Herring made his debut for New Zealand in a test match in 1920 against the touring England team at the Auckland Domain in front of an estimated 34,000 spectators. New Zealand was soundly beaten by 31 points to 7 with Herring playing in the second row. In 1921 he transferred back to rugby union but only played one match for Marist Old Boys before transferring back to rugby league and joining the Marist Old Boys rugby league club for the remainder of the season. He then transferred back to his old Grafton Athletic club who had by this point changed their name to Fire Brigade for 1922 where at their annual social at the end of the season he was awarded a medal for being their best forward. He then returned to the Maritime club where he played from 1923 to 1927. By this time however Maritime had renamed themselves "Athletic" and then later "Grafton Athletic" (not to be confused with the club he began his rugby league career with who were the original owners of that name before they folded).

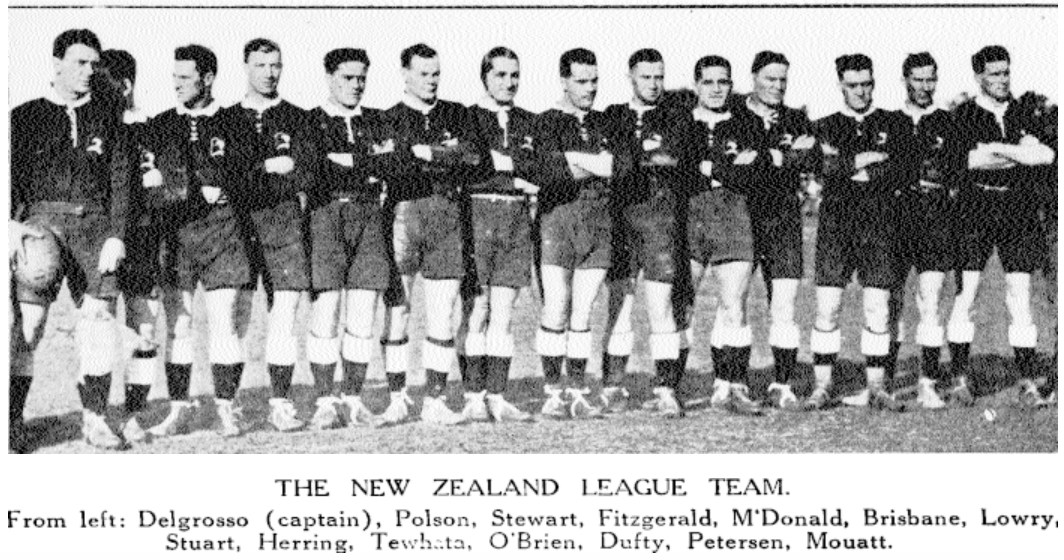

It would be four years before he would again appear in the New Zealand jersey when he played in three tests against the touring England team. New Zealand was to secure a famous series victory with wins in the first and second tests (6–0 and 13–11) with Herring in the front row in each match. He scored a try in the third test which New Zealand lost 31 points to 11.

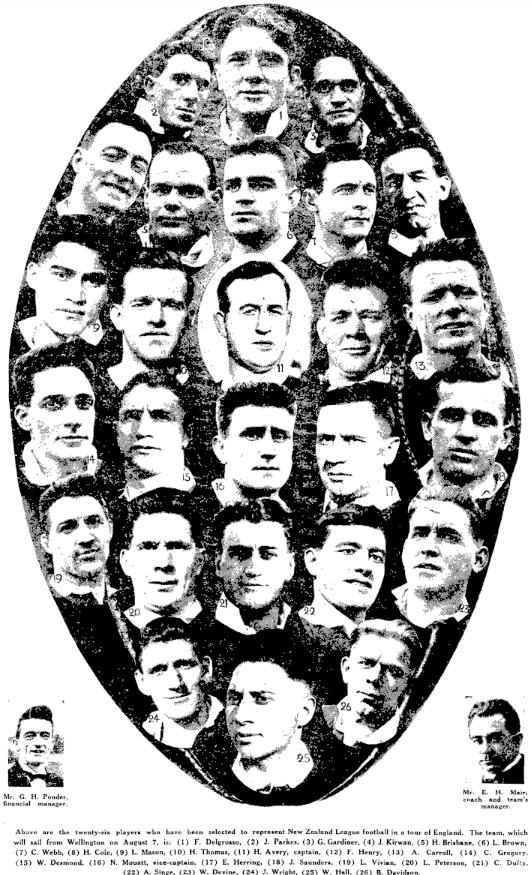

In 1925 Herring was selected for the North Island team in an inter-island games against the South Island. Herring ran in three tries in a 27 to 9 win for the North Island. In 1925 he toured Australia with the New Zealand team and played in 6 tour matches. And in 1926/27 he played in 30 of the 34 games on the ill-fated tour of England including three test matches against England.

After his return he played again for Grafton Athletic in 1927 but they were relegated at the end of the season and he finished his career with the Newton Rangers in 1928. After retiring as a player he had been involved in the formation and management of the Avondale Rugby League club.

=== Life and death ===
On 20 April 1921 Herring married Edith Viola Wright. They had one daughter, Beverly Maureen Herring (1926-2019).

Ernie Herring was a fire fighter by trade, enrolling in the force in 1916 at the age of 18. In 1929 he became the station officer at Avondale, Auckland. After attending a fire at Jerboa Manufacturing Company's wood furniture and toy factory at Puriri Street in New Lynn, on 17 September 1947, he collapsed and died of a heart attack in the ambulance on the way to the hospital. He was buried at Waikumete Cemetery, Glen Eden on the cremation lawn (B Row 1, Plot 187).
