= Eric Grey =

New Zealand international rugby league footballer

Personal information
- Full name: Eric Charles Grey
- Born: 1 May 1895 Devonport, New Zealand
- Died: 2 May 1977 (aged 82) Mount Eliza, Victoria, Australia

Playing information
- Position: Wing, Fullback
Club
| Years | Team | Pld | T | G | FG | P |
|---|---|---|---|---|---|---|
| 1919–22 | Maritime/Athletic | 40 | 29 | 25 | 6 | 147 |
| 1923–27 | Ponsonby United | 33 | 5 | 10 | 3 | 41 |
| | Total | 73 | 34 | 35 | 9 | 188 |
Representative
| Years | Team | Pld | T | G | FG | P |
| 1920–22 | Auckland | 7 | 4 | 1 | 0 | 14 |
| 1922 | Auckland Province | 1 | 0 | 0 | 0 | 0 |
| 1920 | New Zealand | 2 | 0 | 0 | 0 | 0 |
- Relatives: Ian Grey (son)

Eric Charles Grey (1 May 1895 – 2 May 1977) was a New Zealand rugby league player. A wing, Grey represented Auckland at a provincial level and was a member of the New Zealand national team in 1920. He played two test matches for New Zealand against England. In 1921, he played for Maritime against City Rovers in the first ever game on Carlaw Park and kicked the first goal on the ground. In 1922, Maritime changed their name to Athletic. Grey was a drop goal specialist, and in 1922 alone he kicked 5 goals for Athletics, a number far higher than other years. His son, Ian Grey, also played rugby league for New Zealand. In 1923, Grey transferred to the Ponsonby United team. He played for them in 1923 and 1924 before retiring but came out of retirement to play for them during the 1926 season and played for them again in 1927. He usually played wing or full back but occasionally played centre three quarter and in 1927 played a handful of games in the loose forwards.
