= Con McCarthy (rugby league) =

New Zealand international rugby league footballer

Personal information
- Full name: Cornelius McCarthy
- Born: 14 January 1894; Port Ahuriri, Napier, New Zealand
- Died: 5 November 1968 (aged 74); Masterton, New Zealand

Playing information
- Height: 1.70 m (5 ft 7 in)
- Weight: 70 kg (155 lb)
- Position: Stand-off
Club
Years	Team	Pld	T	G	FG	P
1919–20	Ahuriri	13	2	7	0	20
Representative
Years	Team	Pld	T	G	FG	P
1919–22	Hawke's Bay	5	2	4	0	14
1919–21	New Zealand	11	0	0	0	0
1919	New Zealand XIII	1	0	0	0	0
1920	Rest of New Zealand	1	0	0	0	0
1920	North Island	1	0	0	0	0

Cornelius "Con" McCarthy (14 January 1894 – 5 November 1968) was a New Zealand professional rugby league footballer who played in the 1910s. He played at representative level for New Zealand, and Hawke's Bay, as a stand-off.

== International and representative honours ==
McCarthy who was a butcher by trade, represented Hawkes Bay in 1919, playing for them against Auckland at Carlaw Park. He made his debut for New Zealand in the same season on their tour of Australia where no test matches were played. He made 9 appearances on the tour. He then played for New Zealand against an Auckland XIII after their return. He also played in 2 matches for Hawke's Bay against the touring Australian side. Hawke's Bay were soundly beaten on both matches by 67 to 4 (with McCarthy kicking 2 penalties) and 73-7. In 1920 he played for a Rest of New Zealand team against Auckland and his side were hammered 54-0. On August 5, 1920 McCarthy played in the centres for the North Island against the touring England at Napier. He captained the side who went down 46-5.

== Military service ==
McCarthy briefly served as a lance corporal in F Company, New Zealand Expeditionary Force in 1916, but was discharged after three months as being medically unfit for service. He did not travel overseas or see active service.
