= Maritime Football Club =

Rugby league club in Auckland

Maritime
Club information
- Full name: Maritime Football Club
- Nickname(s): Watersiders, Seasiders
- Colours: (Maritime) Maroon, then later Red, white, & blue; (Grafton Athletic) Royal blue with gold band; (Kingsland Athletic) Maroon, with blue & gold shield
- Founded: 1918
- Exited: 1930

Former details
- Grounds: Victoria Park; Auckland Domain; Carlaw Park
- Captain: Bert Avery
- Competition: Auckland Rugby League

Records
- Premierships: 1920
- Runners-up: 1919, 1923
- Minor premierships: 1920, 1923 (tied)
- Norton Cup: 1928

Maritime was a rugby league club in Auckland. They competed from 1918 to 1930 under the name Maritime for 4 seasons, Athletic for 4 seasons, Grafton Athletic for 3 seasons and Kingsland Athletic (following a merger with Kingsland Rovers) for 2 seasons, before the club was 'forced' to join with Marist Old Boys in 1931.

== Club History ==
=== Formation and first season ===
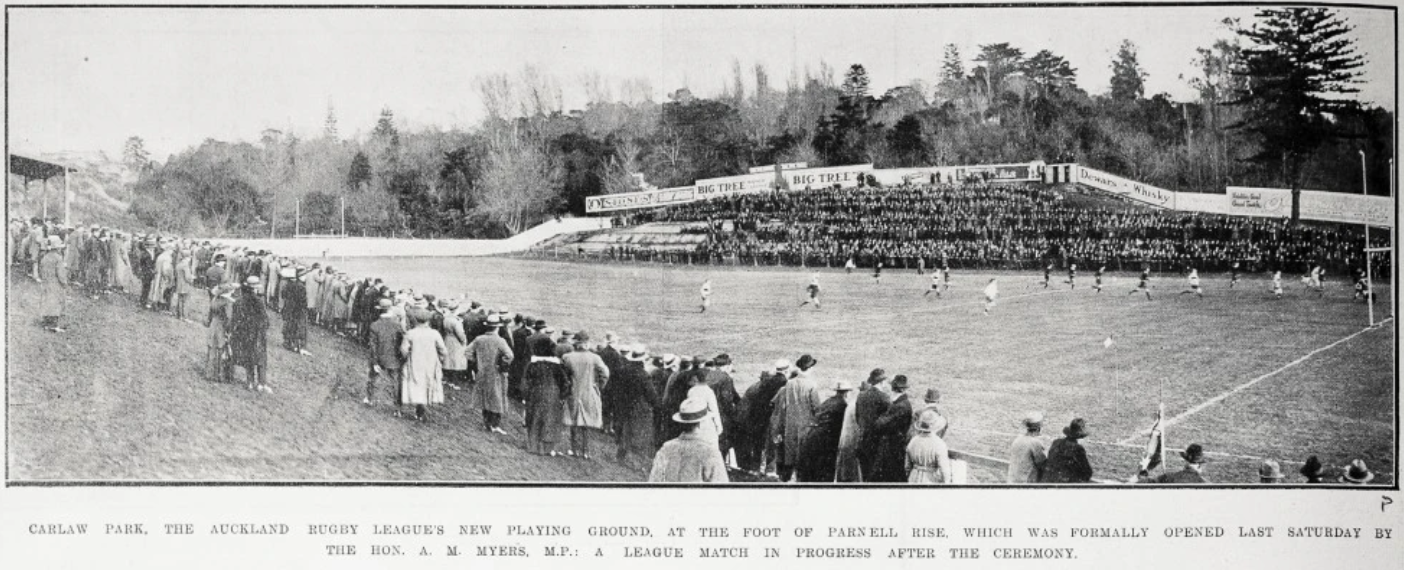
Maritime playing City Rovers in the first ever game at Carlaw Park on June 25, 1921.

On 10 April 1918 the “Maritime Club” applied to the Auckland Rugby League for affiliation to the league. They were nominating a senior team and their application was granted. They also nominated T. Sullivan as their delegate which was also approved while their registration of club colours was “held over for one week” due to another club applying to use the same colours. Their club colours eventually settled on red, white, and blue though they in fact wore maroon in their first two seasons at least. Their first match was against Newton Rangers at Victoria Park, Auckland on April 27. Their first ever senior squad was listed as “A Cross, Campney, Dufty, Lynne, Barchard, Haddon, Brett, Kingi, Hira, Welson, Williams, Herb Lunn, Doran, Hemming, E Stallworthy, Wheeler, Newdick, Hunt, Martin, and Avery”. They were defeated 23 points to 9 with their points being scored by Pitman (try), and Dufty (3 goals). They played 2 further practice matches before the season officially got under way on May 18. They put up a good showing in their first ever official match and only lost to City Rovers 15–13 on Victoria Park with an estimated crowd of 5,000. They struggled at times during the season but competed well in many matches. They finished with only 1 win from 9 matches and that victory was a win by default over the North Shore Albions who soon after withdrew from the competition owing to the war decimating playing numbers. Maritime had issues themselves with playing numbers and withdrew their junior team from the competition early in the year due to a “lack of players”.

Maritime did put up a strong showing in the Roope Rooster competition however when they defeated Grafton Athletic 16–11, and then Newton Rangers 13–8 to make the final. In the final played at the Auckland Domain in front of 7,000 spectators they were defeated by City Rovers 6–3. During the season they had their first ever Auckland representative in George Davidson when he turned out for them against Canterbury on September 14 at the Auckland Domain before a crowd of 10,000. He scored a spectacular 5 tries in a 45–9 win. Davidson was a champion sprinter and competed for New Zealand at the 1920 Antwerp Olympics coming 5th in the 200m final.

During the first season their club secretary, Charles Albert Brett died of influenza on November 21, 1918, aged just 29. At their annual meeting at the League club rooms on Swanson Street at the start of 1919 it was reported that as a result of his death the club was unable to complete a very thorough report on their inaugural season. At the meeting Mr. C. Liversidge presided. Their original officers from 1918 were not reported in the newspapers however their elected officers for the 1919 season were:- Patron, Mr. P. Virtue; president, Mr. C. Liversidge; vice-presidents, Hon. Arthur Myers, Hon. T. Wilford, Messrs W. Evans, Jack Endean, Captain Fox, Dingley, C. Weaver, H. McLeod, R. Bromwich, W. Ryan, W. Meredith, J. Brasier, W. Morrow, Foreman E. Davis, T.R. Baillie, Jim Gleeson, T. Hayes, C. Seagar, W. Ah Chee, M. Saunders; secretary and treasurer, William James Liversidge; committee, Messrs. Sutton, Sheenan, Bert Avery, Lynee, Stallworthy, George Davidson, Roberts, Mitchell, Brady; delegate to the league, Mr. E. Stallworthy; hon. Auditors, Messrs. Ivan and N. Culpan. They had also secured the playing services of future New Zealand captain, Bert Avery who had returned from the war. Avery and John Lang were to become Maritime's first New Zealand representative players when they debuted for them against Australia on August 23.

=== 1919 to 1921 as Maritime and lone title ===
Maritime's next 3 years saw them perform very well in the A grade competition known as the Myers Cup at the time. In 1919 they finished 3rd out of 8 teams with a 5-2-1 record finishing just 1 point behind Ponsonby United. They drew their round 9 match with North Shore Albions and their round 10 match with Ponsonby when a win would have won them the title. They once again made the Roope Rooster final, losing to Newton Rangers 8–5 in the final. George Davidson led the competition in tries scored with 14 and points scored with 64. The 1919 season was also notable as they played a benefit match against City to raise money for Opai Asher who had been injured in an accident. They also went on a three match tour which was very unusual for a club side to do in this era. They played Petane at McLean Park in Napier, and Ahuriri on the same ground on October 9 and 11 respectively. They won the matches 32-0 and 37–3. They then played Taradale and beat the local side 31–3 on October 15. They also played Richmond Rovers in Thames in a series of matches on October 18 though the results were not reported. During the 1919 season the Post & Telegraph Football Club decided to merge with the Maritime club.

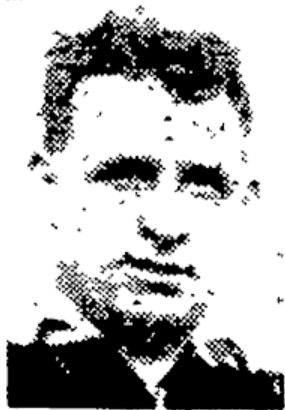
Jim O'Brien

1920 saw Maritime win their one and only first grade title (Monteith Shield) when they finished the season with a 9 win and 2 loss record ahead of City Rovers 2 points back. For the third year in a row they lost the Roope Rooster final by 12 points to 6 against Newton Rangers. Eric Grey who had joined Maritime in 1919 represented New Zealand during the season in two test matches against the touring England side.

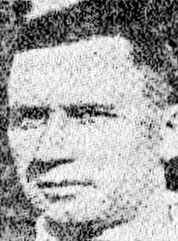
Ernie Herring

While Ernie Herring who had joined in 1920 also represented New Zealand in one test match against the English side. Jim O'Brien who would also go on to represent New Zealand in one test match against Queensland in 1925 also was in his debut senior season after returning from World War 1 the previous year aged 23. He transferred to the Devonport United club the following season.

1921 was another good year for Maritime though they could only manage runner up in the Monteith Shield and remarkably managed to lose the Roope Rooster final for the 4th straight time. They had earlier beaten Marist 10–8 in round 1 though the league ordered the match replayed after Marist complained that the referee had blown the game off before time was up. Maritime won the replay 21-10 and then the semi-final 12–7 over Fire Brigade. Maritime's loss in the final came at the hands of City Rovers 30–14. During the season Maritime made history when they were the first team to ever play on Carlaw Park on June 25 alongside City Rovers. They lost the match 10–8. Future New Zealand representative Ivan Littlewood had joined the side and finished second in the try scoring lists with 12 tries for the season. They were also joined for the 1921 and 1922 season by Australian professional boxer Mike Flynn who spent a large amount of time in the early 1920s in New Zealand and later joined the City Rovers in 1923.

=== 1922-1925 Name change to ‘Athletic’ ===
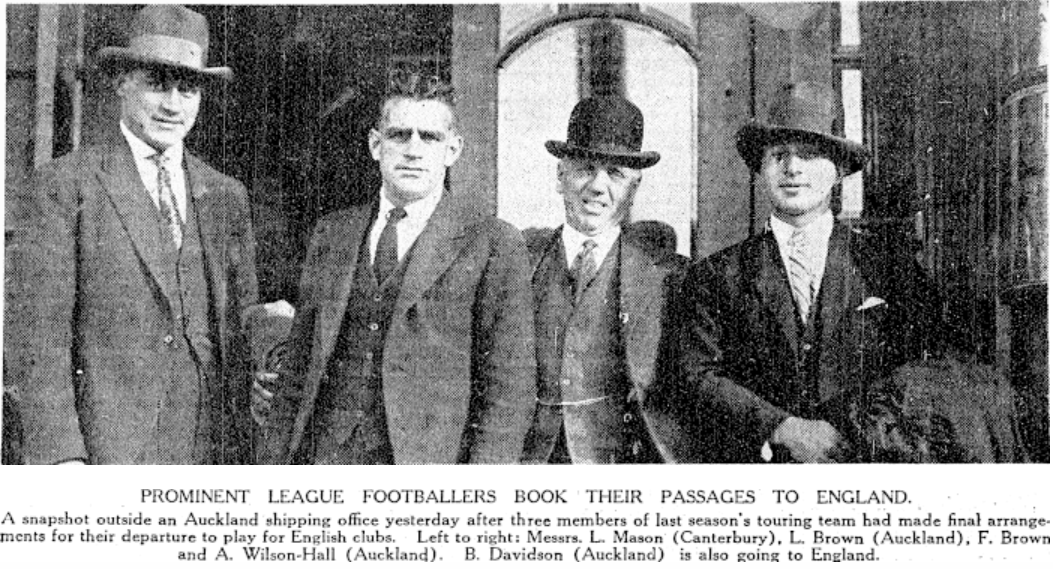
Maritime players Len Mason and Wilson Hall, along with Lou Brown (Newton) prior to departing for England.

At the start of the 1922 season Maritime changed their name to ‘Athletic’ and changed their club colours from red, white, and blue to royal blue with a gold band across the chest. It was said at their annual meeting that they had 130 registered players and had entered six teams in the previous season. They could only manage 6th place in the 8 team competition with a 6 win, 8 loss record and astonishingly lost the Roope Rooster final for the 5th consecutive year, this time losing to Ponsonby United by a single point, 11–10.

They had gained the services of New Zealand international Craddock Dufty in 1922 and he was to remain with the club until the end of the 1926 season. He led the competition in points scored in 1923 with 59 points. Going into the final round of the 1923 season Athletic had a 2-point lead over City Rovers in the Monteith Shield but lost to them 11-8 thus forcing a final to be played a week later. Athletic continued their miserable record in finals by losing 8–7 at Carlaw Park in front of 11,500 spectators.

The 1924 season saw Athletic come 4th of 9 teams with an 8 win, 2 draw, 5 loss record. Bill Te Whata had joined the club in July. In August he played for New Zealand against the touring England side in the first test along with Maritime teammate Craddock Dufty. Thus they became the club's fifth and sixth New Zealand representatives whilst members. Dufty had of course made his New Zealand debut in 1919. Joe Hadley was the leading try scorer in the senior competitions with 12, while Craddock Dufty top scored once again with 91 points. In 1925 Athletic could only manage 6th in a 7 team competition, winning just 4 matches from 12 games. Wilson Hall who had joined Athletic in 1923 became the 7th New Zealand representative at Athletic when he played 5 matches on the tour of Australia and another against the touring Queensland side. Len Mason had also spent the 1924 and 1925 seasons at the club but did not represent New Zealand until the following season when he had moved to Christchurch.

=== 1926-1927 Name change to Grafton Athletic ===
The start of the 1926 season saw Athletic change their name to Grafton Athletic. The name Grafton was the suburb immediately south of the location of Carlaw Park. The name change did not change their fortunes and they finished last, only winning 2 matches out of 13. They were not helped when towards the end of the season Bert Avery and Ernie Herring departed for England to play for New Zealand on their tour there. Avery was chosen as the New Zealand captain for the tour while Herring ended up playing 30 matches, the most of any of the tourists.

In 1927 they fared even worse losing all 12 matches and finishing last once again. Albert Renwick joined the club committee at the start of the season. He had previously played rugby for Grafton and Auckland before switching to rugby league and being signed by Wigan where he played for some time before a return to New Zealand. He then became heavily involved in rugby league for many years. As a result of their poor season they were forced to play a promotion/relegation match with Ellerslie United. Champion Auckland sprinter, Harry Hudson joined the senior side and scored a try on debut on the wing in their opening round loss to Marist. Grafton lost 11-3 and were demoted to the B Division for the 1928 season.

In 1928 in the B Division (Norton Cup) they won the competition going undefeated with a 10 win, 2 draw record. They also made the Stallard Cup knockout final but lost to Point Chevalier 15–13 in the final. Their championship win earned them the right to play off with Ellerslie United (who had finished last in the Monteith Shield). Grafton again lost the match however by 13 points to 11 meaning they would remain in the B division.

=== 1929-1930 Amalgamation with Kingsland Rovers ===
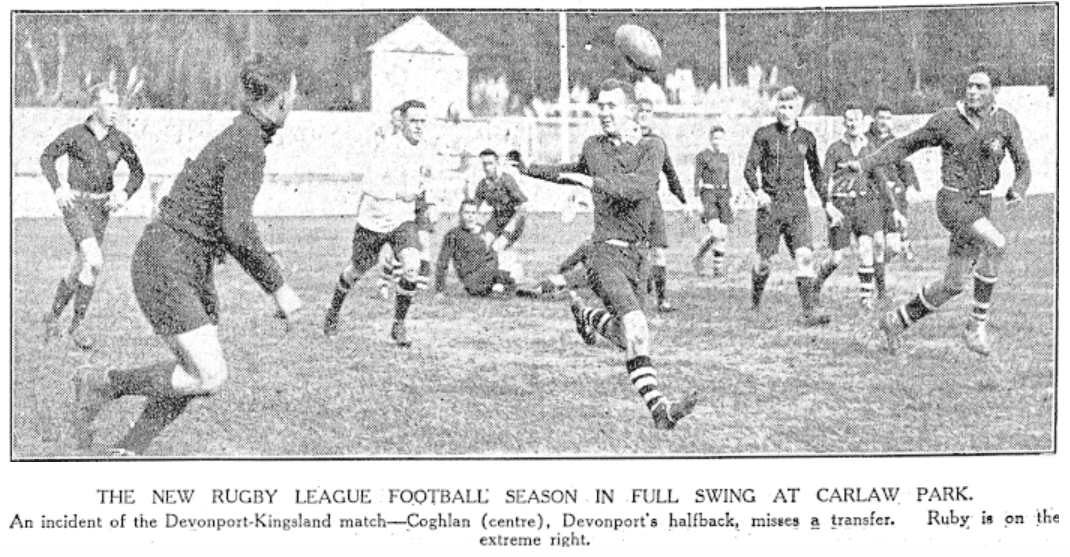
Kingsland v Devonport on May 5, 1930, at Carlaw Park. Marist won 16-13 but the result was over turned due to an unregistered Marist player.

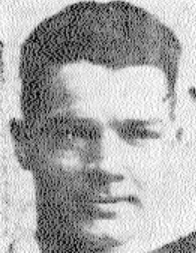
Claude List

Rather than remain in the B Division again Grafton Athletic decided to amalgamate with the Kingsland Rovers club and apply to enter a team in the Monteith Shield competition. A combined meeting was held in early April with 80 members in attendance with the new club name to be Kingsland Athletic Football Club. They decided to change their club colours to be a maroon jersey with a blue and gold shield and a “K.A.” monogram. Their first committee as a combined club “was: Patron, Mr. W.J. Webb; vice-patrons, Messrs. Bartram E. Barnaby and Pratt; president, Mr. J. McQuillan; vice presidents same as last year with power to add; hon. Secretary, Mr. J.R. Angelo, Messrs. Bert Avery and T. Ratcliffe, delegate to Auckland Rugby League, Mr. H. Catterall; delegate to junior management committee, Mr. W. Dryland; club captain, Mr. John McGregor; committee, Messrs. Floray (chairman). H. Neil, A. Brown, L. Lucas, A. Huxford, J. Carter, Scott, Newman, and Opie”. Their admission into the first grade competition was granted at an April 17 meeting of the Auckland Rugby League.

The new team featured Kingsland Rovers player Claude List who had represented New Zealand. They were coached by Bert Avery and finished the 1929 season with a 5 win, 1 draw, 8 loss record to finish 6th out of 8 teams. In 1930 they fared similarly winning 4, drawing 1 and losing 8 and once again finished 6th of 8.

=== Joining Marist Old Boys ===
The 1931 season saw Auckland Rugby League seeking to make the first grade competition more competitive. There had been a feeling that there were too many teams and the crowd number had dropped accordingly. The decision to drop from 8 teams to 6 had been made at the conclusion of the 1930 season. Kingsland Athletic had been removed from the A Grade and with a new reserve grade competition forming would have been forced into a Senior B grade which would have essentially been a 3rd division in terms of playing quality. As a result, they sought permission to join with the much stronger Marist Old Boys. They were “informed that the league would not opposed such a move”. And thus the Kingsland Athletic Football Club which had started out as Maritime Football Club in 1918 was no more. Players, R Carter, Herring, Claude List and a handful of others moved to the Marist club while others were given free transfers to any other club.

== Season records ==
=== Myers Cup/Monteith Shield (first grade championship) ===
Season	Name	Pld	W	D	L	PF	PA	PD	Pts	Position (Teams)
1918	Maritime	9	1	0	8	45	110	-65	2	Fifth (Six)
1919	Maritime	8	5	2	1	123	88	+35	12	Second equal (Eight)
1920	Maritime	11	9	0	2	168	93	+75	18	First (Six)
1921	Maritime	9	6	0	3	135	112	+23	12	Second (Seven)
1922	Athletic	14	6	0	8	242	208	+34	12	Sixth (Eight)
1923	Athletic	13	10	0	3	180	87	+93	20	Second (Seven)
1924	Athletic	15	8	2	5	257	206	+51	18	Fourth (Nine)
1925	Athletic	12	4	0	8	133	276	-143	8	Sixth (Seven)
1926	Grafton Athletic	11	2	0	9	112	269	-157	4	Seventh (Seven)
1927	Grafton Athletic	12	0	0	12	81	305	-224	0	Seventh (Seven)
1929	Kingsland Athletic	14	5	1	8	143	209	-66	11	Sixth (Eight)
1930	Kingsland Athletic	13	4	1	8	129	166	-37	9	Sixth (Eight)
1918-27, 1929–30	Total	141	60	6	75	1748	2129	-381	126	

=== Norton Cup (B Division) ===
Season	Name	Pld	W	D	L	PF	PA	PD	Pts	Position (Teams)
1928	Grafton Athletic	12	10	2	0	145	69	+76	22	First (Seven)

=== Roope Rooster (knock out competition) ===
Note that the Grafton Athletic side of 1926 and 1927 was not the Grafton Athletic (1914-22) that existed previously and folded at the end of the 1922 season. The Maritime club adopted the name at the start of the 1922 season before changing to Grafton Athletic in 1926 and then merging with Kingsland Rovers in 1929 to become Kingsland Athletic.

Season	Name	Pld	W	D	L	PF	PA	Position
1918	Maritime	3	2	0	1	32	25	Lost the final to City Rovers 6-3
1919	Maritime	3	2	0	1	41	35	Lost the final to Newton Rangers 8-5
1920	Maritime	3	2	0	1	26	23	Lost the final to Newton Rangers 12-6
1921	Maritime	4	3	0	1	57	55	Lost the final to City Rovers 30-14
1922	Athletic	3	2	0	1	31	30	Lost the final to Ponsonby United 11-10
1923	Athletic	1	0	0	1	16	21	Lost in R1 to Devonport United 21-16
1924	Athletic	2	1	0	1	32	31	Lost semi-final to City Rovers 29-11
1925	Athletic	1	0	0	1	23	50	Lost in R1 to Ponsonby United 50-23
1926	Grafton Athletic	1	0	0	1	10	29	Lost in R1 to Marist Old Boys 29-10
1927	Grafton Athletic	1	0	0	1	16	27	Lost in R1 to Ponsonby United
1929	Kingsland Athletic	1	0	0	1	3	9	Lost in R1 to Marist Old Boys 9-3
1930	Kingsland Athletic	1	0	0	1	13	30	Lost in R1 to City Rovers 31-13
1918-27, 1929–30	Total	24	12	0	12	300	365	

=== Stallard Cup (B Division knock out competition) ===
Season	Name	Pld	W	D	L	PF	PA	Position
1928	Grafton Athletic	3	2	0	1	41	35	Lost the final to Point Chevalier 15-13

== All time head to head senior records ==
Records include only senior side matches in 1st grade, Roope Rooster, and B Grade competitions, along with friendly matches.

Head to head
Opponent	Start	End	Games	Wins	Draws	Losses	For	Against
Newton Rangers	1918	1930	25	10	0	15	319	390
North Shore Albions	1918	1930	23	10	1	12	246	375
City Rovers	1918	1930	30	6	1	23	284	558
Ponsonby United	1918	1930	24	8	1	15	310	440
Grafton Athletic	1918	1922	12	8	0	4	199	133
Marist Old Boys	1919	1930	28	13	3	12	344	406
Petane (Hawkes Bay)	1919	-	1	1	0	0	32	0
Ahuriri (Hawkes Bay)	1919	-	1	1	0	0	37	3
Taradale (Hawkes Bay)	1919	-	1	1	0	0	31	3
Lower Waikato	1920	-	1	1	0	0	31	20
Hamilton (Waikato)	1921	-	1	0	0	1	16	19
Richmond Rovers	1922	1930	17	12	0	5	202	132
Wednesday Representatives	1923	-	1	1	0	0	9	5
Māngere United	1924	1928	4	2	1	1	47	37
Ellerslie United	1924	1930	8	4	0	4	96	92
Otahuhu Rovers	1928	-	2	2	0	0	30	13
Parnell	1928	-	2	1	1	0	25	20
Kingsland Rovers	1928	-	3	3	0	0	38	18
Point Chevalier	1928	-	3	2	0	1	36	25
Northcote and Birkenhead Ramblers	1928	-	3	3	0	0	43	9
TOTAL	1918	1930	190	89	8	93	2375	2698

== Representative players ==
=== New Zealand players (with appearances whilst members of the Maritime club) ===
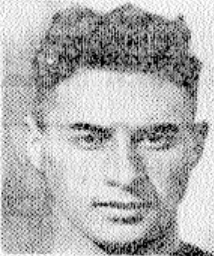
Wilson Hall

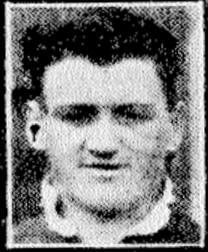
Craddock Dufty

- Bert Avery 1919-27 (53)
- John Lang 1919 (2)
- Eric Grey 1920 (2)
- Ernie Herring 1920-27 (37)
- Bill Te Whata 1924 (1)
- Craddock Dufty 1924-26 (32)
- Wilson Hall 1925 (6)

=== Auckland players (with appearances whilst members of the Maritime club) ===
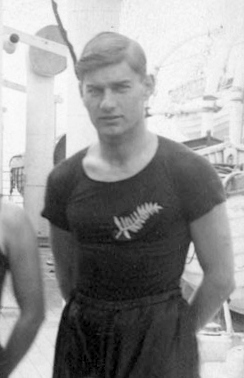
George Davidson, Maritime's first ever Auckland representative. He also competed for New Zealand at the 1920 Antwerp Olympics.

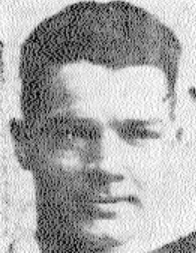
Claude List

- George Davidson 1918-19 (6)
- Arthur Sutton 1919 (1)
- Bert Avery 1919-26 (17)
- George Yardley 1919-23 (6)
- George Cargill 1919 (1)
- A Cross 1919 (1)
- Jim Brien 1920 (1)
- Eric Grey 1920-22 (7)
- Mike Flynn 1921-22 (7)
- John Lang 1921 (4)
- Ivan Littlewood 1921 (1)
- John (Jack) McGregor 1921-23 (5)
- Bill Ballantyne 1921 (2)
- M Clark 1921 (2)
- Craddock Dufty 1922-26 (13)
- Charles "Snow" Webb 1922-23 (3)
- Wilson Hall 1923 (3)
- Ernie Herring 1924-26 (3)
- James Malloy 1925 (1)
- Bill Te Whata 1925 (1)
- Len Mason 1925 (1)
- George Raynor 1926 (1)
- Claude List 1929-30 (4)
- Robert (Bob) Carter 1929-30 (4)

=== Other ===
- Jim O'Brien Maritime: 1920–21, New Zealand: 1925, Auckland: 1923-27 (21), North Island 1927 (1)

== Club titles ==
=== First grade side ===
- 1920 Monteith Shield (First grade champions)
- 1928 Norton Cup (B division champions)

=== Lower grades ===
- 1918 Fourth grade champions (this was the Post & Telegraph club who became affiliated with Maritime in 1919)
- 1922 Sixth grade B champions
- 1923 Sixth grade B champions
- 1924 Sixth grade A champions
- 1926 Third grade open champions, and Second grade knockout competition winners
- 1927 Third grade open knockout competition winners
- 1930 Third grade intermediate (as Kingsland Athletic - amalgamated side)

== Top point scorers and try scorers (1918-1930) ==
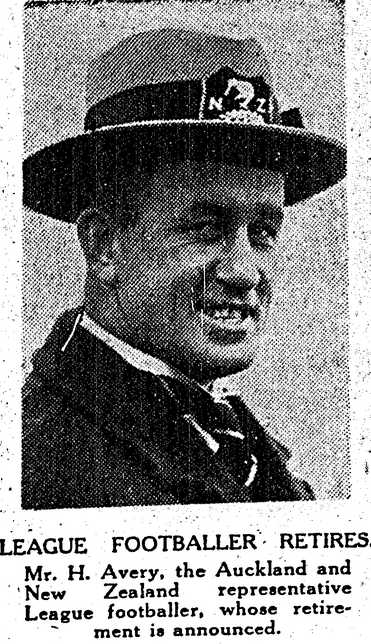
Bert Avery, Maritime's second highest point scorer, highest try scorer and most appearances.

The point scoring lists are compiled from all matches played by the first grade side including championship, Roope Rooster, Phelan Shield, and friendly matches.

Rank	Player	Start	End	Games	Tries	Con	Pen	DG	Mk	Pts
1	Craddock Dufty	1922	1926	50	24	66	23	0	0	250
2	Bert Avery	1919	1927	97	57	0	1	0	0	173
3	Eric Grey	1919	1922	40	29	16	7	6	1	147
4	George Yardley	1919	1924	63	20	11	7	0	0	96
5	Ralph Longville	1926	1930	39	5	22	14	0	0	87
6	George Davidson	1918	1919	20	19	9	3	0	1	83
7	John (Jack) McGregor	1920	1927	86	24	1	0	2	0	78
8	Ernie Herring	1920	1927	70	21	1	0	0	0	65
9	Arthur Sutton	1919	1922	30	14	6	1	1	1	60
10	Ivan Littlewood	1921	1922	18	17	1	0	0	0	53
11	John Lang	1919	1926	34	9	9	1	1	1	51
12=	Robert (Bob) Carter	1929	1930	25	16	0	0	0	0	48
12=	Joe Hadley	1924	1925	22	16	0	0	0	0	48
14	Claude List	1929	1930	28	13	0	0	1	0	41
15	E Lucas	1926	1930	51	5	5	6	0	0	37
16	Dufty	1918	-	12	2	6	6	0	3	36
17	Mike Flynn	1921	1922	19	2	11	3	0	0	34
18	Jim Brien	1920	1922	37	10	1	0	0	0	32
19	Len Mason	1924	1925	20	8	2	0	0	0	28
20=	John Angelo	1925	1929	31	5	4	2	0	0	27
20=	G Nicholson	1918	1923	34	9	0	0	0	0	27
22=	Wilson Hall	1923	1925	35	6	4	0	0	0	26
22=	Herb Lunn	1918	1922	38	6	2	2	0	0	26
24	Francis (Frank) Herring	1929	1930	16	1	7	4	0	0	25
25=	Vivian Hogg	1918	1920	25	6	2	0	0	1	24
25=	Redmond Lonergan	1922	1923	15	8	0	0	0	0	24
25=	Charles "Snow" Webb	1921	1926	60	8	0	0	0	0	24

== Head to Head records ==
These matches include all senior fixtures that Maritime played between 1918 and 1930.

Top point scorers
Opponent	Start	End	Games	Wins	Draws	Losses	For	Against
Newton Rangers	1918	1930	25	10	0	15	319	390
North Shore Albions	1918	1930	23	10	1	12	246	375
Ponsonby United	1918	1930	24	8	1	15	310	440
City Rovers	1918	1930	30	6	1	23	284	558
Grafton Athletic	1918	1922	12	8	0	4	199	133
Marist Old Boys	1919	1930	28	13	3	12	344	406
Richmond Rovers	1922	1930	17	12	0	5	202	132
Māngere United	1924	1928	4	2	1	1	47	37
Ellerslie United	1924	1930	8	4	0	4	96	92
Petane (Hawkes Bay)	1919	-	1	1	0	0	32	0
Ahuriri (Hawkes Bay)	1919	-	1	1	0	0	37	3
Taradale (Taranaki)	1919	-	1	1	0	0	31	3
Lower Waikato	1920	-	1	1	0	0	31	20
Hamilton (Waikato)	1921	-	1	0	0	1	16	19
Wednesday Representatives	1923	-	1	1	0	0	9	5
Otahuhu Rovers	1928	-	2	2	0	0	30	13
Parnell	1928	-	2	1	1	0	25	20
Kingsland Rovers	1928	-	3	3	0	0	38	18
Point Chevalier	1928	-	3	2	0	1	36	25
Northcote & Birkenhead Ramblers	1928	-	3	3	0	0	43	9
TOTAL	1918	1930	190	89	8	93	2375	2698

On September 27, 1919 the Maritime club also played City Rovers in an Albert Asher benefit match at Victoria Park however the team also included non Maritime players and was therefore a Maritime XIII. They won 19 points to 13.
