= Craddock Dufty =

New Zealand international rugby league footballer

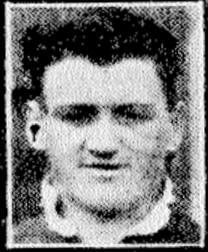

Personal information
- Full name: Calvin Thomas Craddock Dufty
- Born: 10 March 1900 Thames, New Zealand
- Died: 1 August 1955 (aged 55) Auckland, New Zealand

Playing information
- Height: 183 cm (6 ft 0 in)
- Weight: 90 kg (14 st 2 lb)
- Position: Fullback, Wing, Centre
Club
Years	Team	Pld	T	G	FG	P
1919–21	Newton Rangers	24	1	40	2	87
1920	Maritime XIII (Guest)	1	1	0	0	3
1922–26	Athletic/Grafton Athletic	50	24	89	0	250
1927–29	Newton Rangers	31	4	72	1	158
1929–30	Ellerslie	13	0	15	0	30
1931	Ellerslie-Otahuhu	5	1	5	0	13
1936	City Rovers	10	1	22	1	49
	Total	134	32	243	4	590
Representative
Years	Team	Pld	T	G	FG	P
1919	Returned Soldiers	1	0	0	0	0
1919–30	Auckland	27	14	62	2	170
1919–30	New Zealand	51	5	111	1	239
1921	Auckland B	1	0	3	0	6
1922–28	Auckland Province	3	0	6	0	12
1922	New Zealand Māori	8	2	15	0	36
1925–30	North Island	5	0	14	0	28
1928	New Zealand XIII	5	0	2	1	6

Calvin Thomas Craddock Dufty (10 March 1900 – 1 August 1955) was a New Zealand rugby league player who represented New Zealand.

Dufty was born to Samuel and Emily (née Bennett). Dufty's siblings were: Louisa Esther (1901-26), Annie Elizabeth (1902-62), Jessie May (1909-37), and Gwendoline Pearl (1919-90), a brother Cecil Charles who died in infancy (1905), and brothers Thomas Joseph (1899-1949), Samuel Craddock (1911-79), and Arthur James (1911-89). During World War I, Dufty served with the New Zealand Expeditionary Force, embarking in 1916 when aged 16.

On June 2, 1921 Dufty married Ethel May Gerraty.

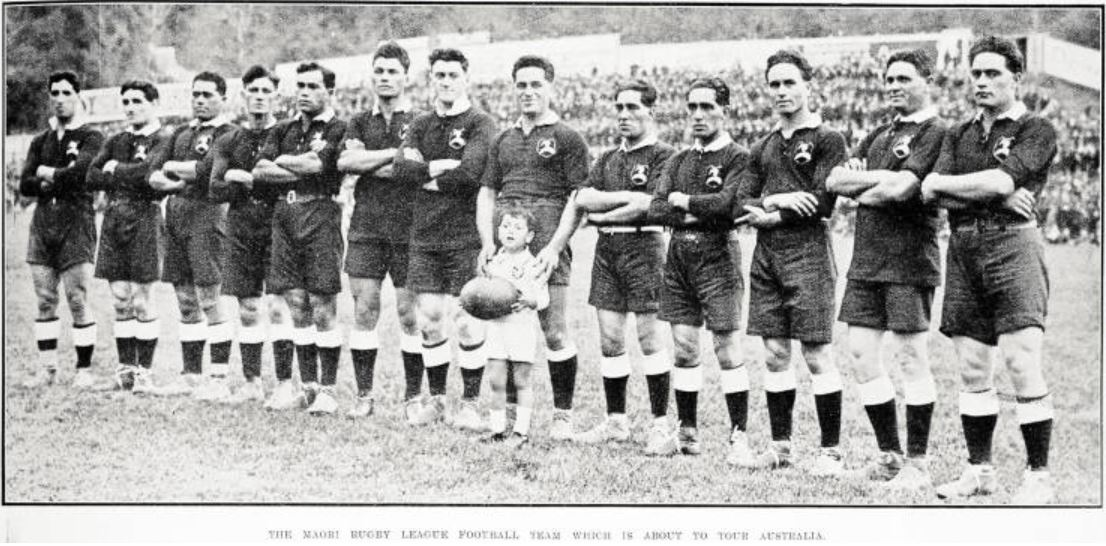
Dufty, 7th from the left in the NZ Māori team to play Auckland at Carlaw Park on 20 May 1922.

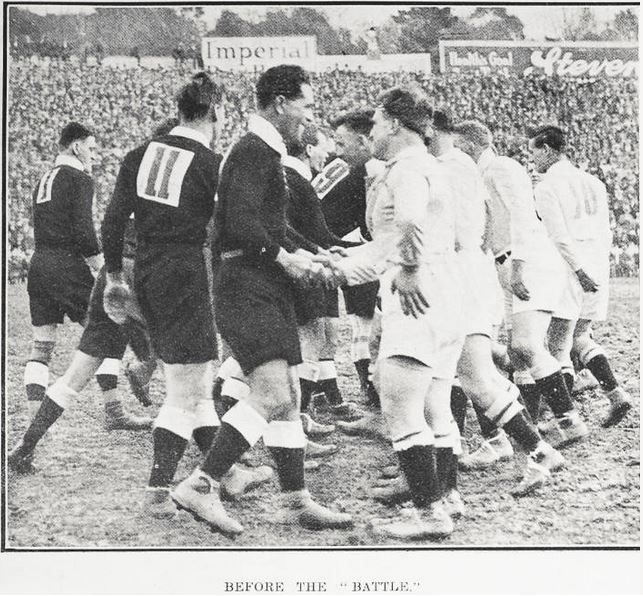
Dufty in the #1 jersey for the 1st test v England in 1924.

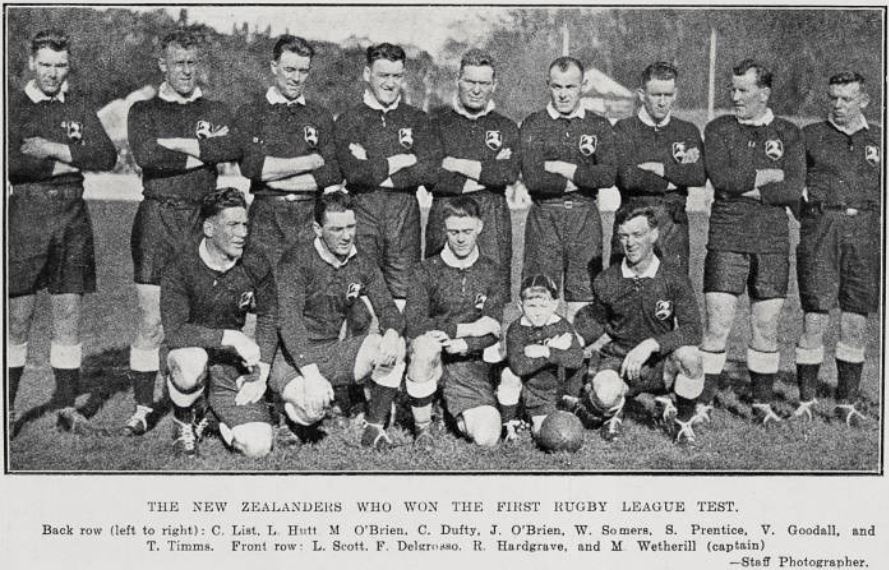
NZ 1st test team to play England at Carlaw Park on 4 August 1928.

Dufty played in the Auckland Rugby League competition for Newton Rangers (1919-21, & 1927-29), Athletic/Grafton Athletic (1922-26), and Ellerslie United (1929-30).

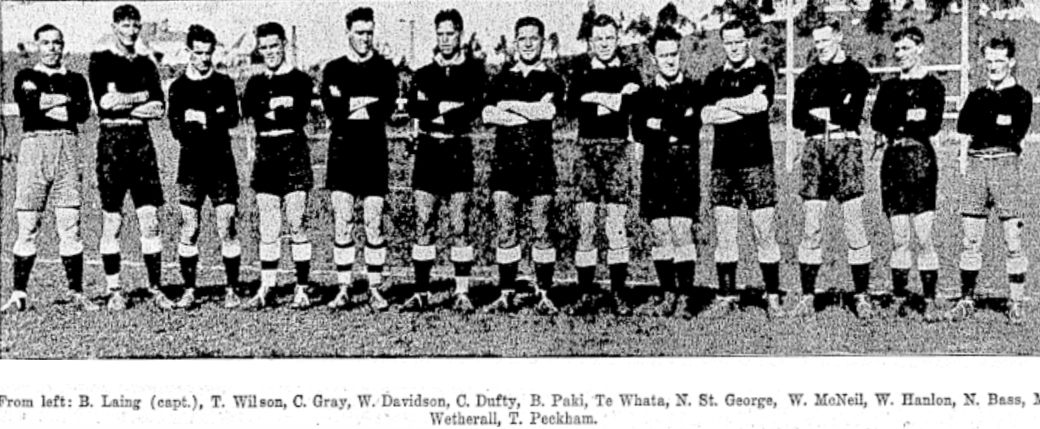
Dufty in the 1922 Auckland Province team to play New South Wales at the Auckland Domain

In 1919, aged 19, Dufty made his debut for Auckland, starring in the regions 37-13 defence of the Northern Union Cup against Hawke's Bay. His performance earned him selection during the 1919 Kangaroo tour of New Zealand for the New Zealand national rugby league team that hosted matches against the Australia national rugby league team for their first tour.

In 1922, he toured Australia with the New Zealand Māori side. He played in five inter-island games for the North Island, his last being in 1930.

In 1922 and in 1924, he played for both Auckland and Auckland Province. In 1922, his appearances were against the touring New South Wales team, while in 1924 his appearances were against the touring Great Britain Lions. He was part of the disastrous 1926-27 New Zealand tour of Great Britain, which resulted in several forwards going on strike and receiving life bans.

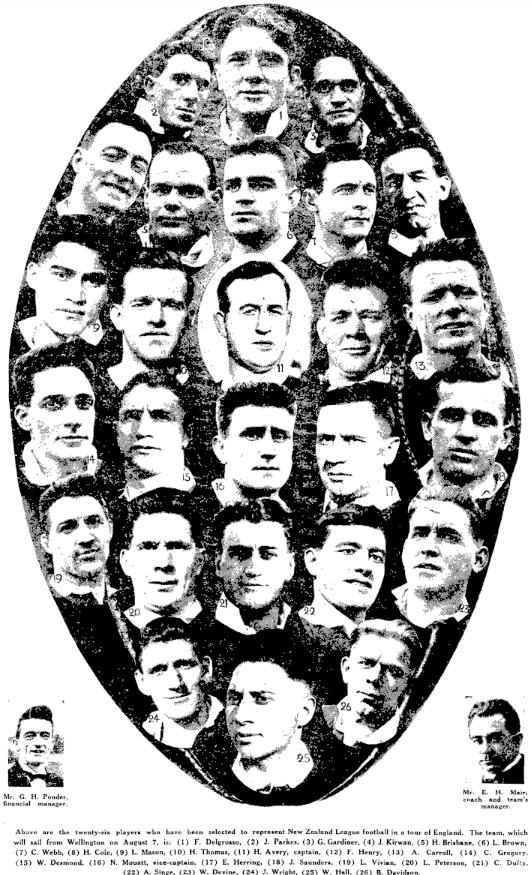
The NZ team to tour England and Wales with Craddock Dufty, second row from the bottom in the centre (21).

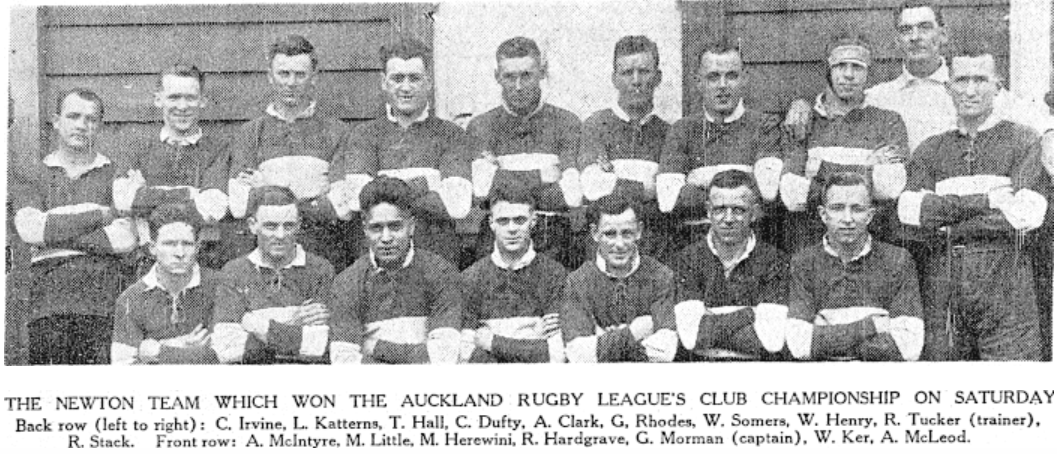
Dufty 4th from the left in the back row of the champion Newton side of 1927.

In 1928, he again played the touring Lions, representing both Auckland City and Auckland Province, as well as New Zealand.

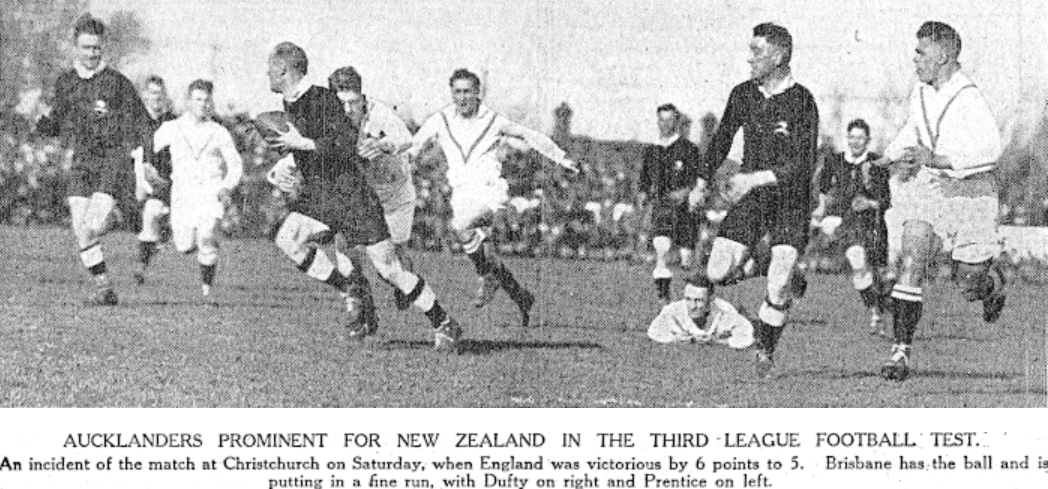
Dufty on the outside supporting Hec Brisbane in the 3rd test against England in 1928 in Christchurch.

He transferred to Ellerslie after moving to the area during 1929 after playing several games for Newton during the season.

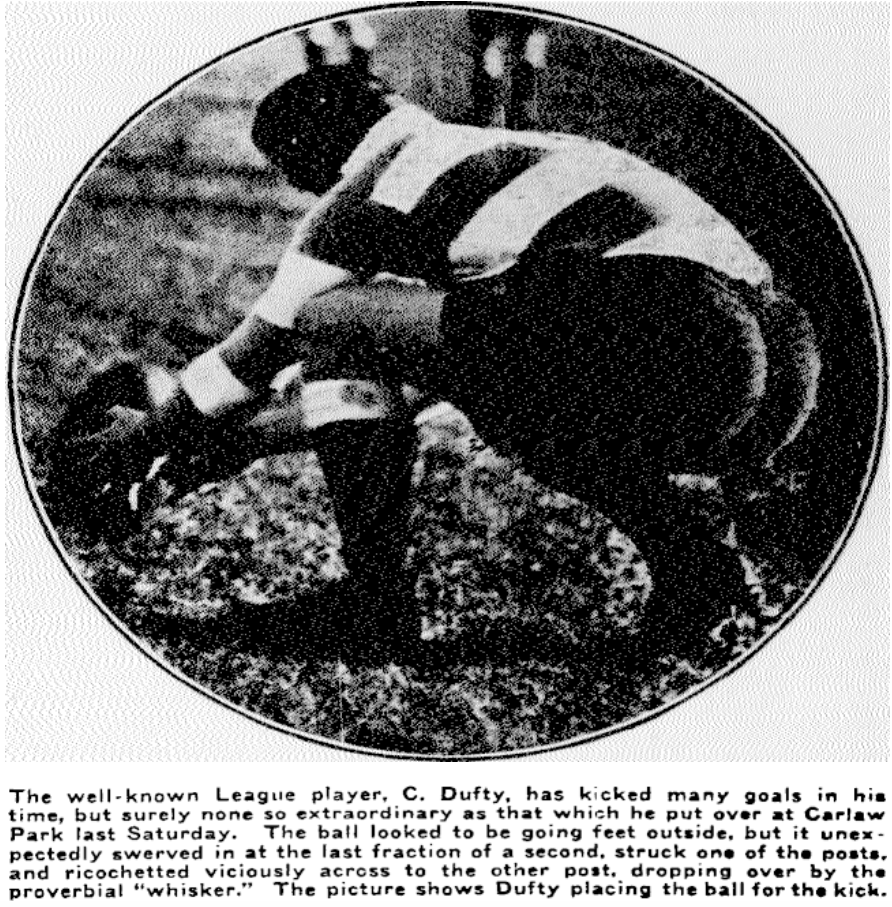
Lining up a penalty kick for Auckland Northland in 1930. It hit both posts before going over.

Dufty finished his career with a then-record 224 points for New Zealand, including 106 goals. He played in twelve test matches, scoring 41 points.

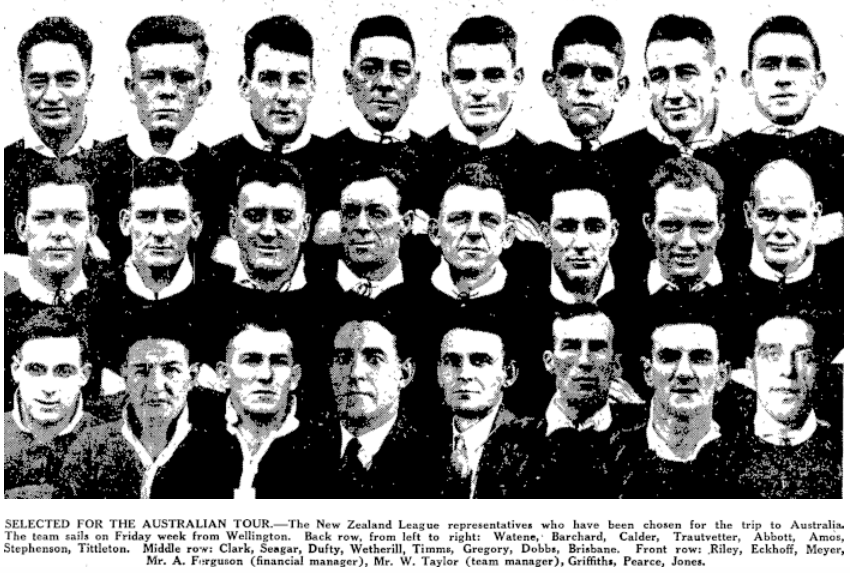

On 1 August 1955, Craddock Dufty died while at Auckland Public Hospital. His wife was Ethel May had died on 9 June 1953. Dufty was buried at Waikumete Cemetery on August 3, 1955. He was survived by three children: June, Moira Coral Dufty (1928-86), and Craddock Samuel Albert Dufty (1938-2020).
