= John Lang (New Zealand rugby league) =

New Zealand international rugby league footballer

Personal information
- Full name: John Henry Lang
- Born: 1 August 1896
- Died: 29 November 1971 (aged 75)

Playing information
- Position: Stand-off
Club
Years	Team	Pld	T	G	FG	P
1919–21	Maritime	30	8	11	1	48
1921–24	Marist Old Boys	38	16	7	1	66
1925–26	Athletic/Grafton Athletic (Maritime)	4	1	0	0	3
	Total	72	25	18	2	117
Representative
Years	Team	Pld	T	G	FG	P
1919	Auckland Returned Soldiers	1	1	0	0	3
1919	New Zealand	2	1	0	0	3
1921–22	Auckland	8	4	0	0	12
1924	Auckland Province	1	0	0	0	0

John Henry Lang (1 August 1896 – 29 November 1971) was a New Zealand rugby league footballer.

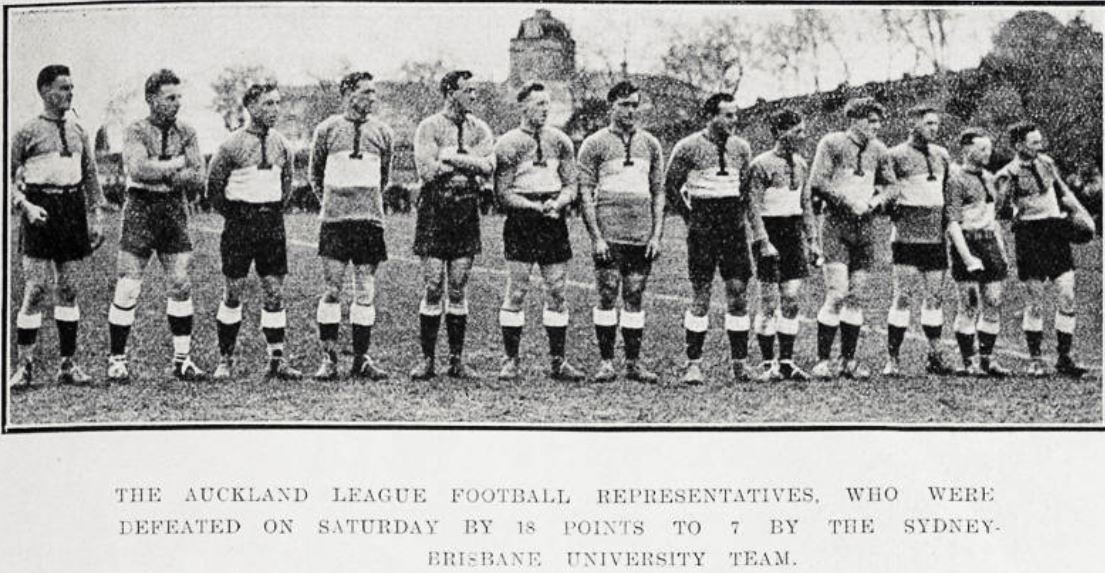
Lang (third from left) in the Auckland team to play the second match against the Australian Universities side at the Auckland Domain on 24 June 1922

A stand-off, Lang represented Auckland provincially. Lang played for Maritime in the Auckland Rugby League competition from 1919 to 1921. During the 1921 season he applied for reinstatement into Rugby Union but was refused and when he returned to league he switched to the Marist Old Boys club.

He was a member of the 1919 New Zealand Kiwis team that played Australia. Lang played in the first test, but did not represent New Zealand again afterwards.
