= 1928 New Zealand rugby league season =

Seasons
- ← 1927 1929 →

The 1928 New Zealand rugby league season was the 21st season of rugby league that had been played in New Zealand.

== International competitions ==
New Zealand lost a series against Great Britain, 1–2. New Zealand were coached by Thomas McClymont and included; Craddock Dufty, Roy Hardgrave, Claude List, Len Scott, Maurice Wetherill (c), Stan Prentice, Frank Delgrosso, Lou Hutt, Wally Somers, Jim O'Brien, Tom Timms, Mick O'Brien, Vern Goodall, Hec Brisbane, Trevor Hall, Alf Townsend, Bert Eckhoff and Tim Peckham.

Auckland Province lost to Great Britain 14-9 after leading 9-8 while Auckland City lost 26–15. Auckland City included Craddock Dufty, Len Scott, Claude List, Roy Hardgrave, Maurice Wetherill, Stan Prentice, Frank Delgrosso, Jim O'Brien, Wally Somers, Lou Hutt, Trevor Hall, J Payne and Alan Clarke. Auckland Province included Joe Menzies from South Auckland as well as Dufty, Scott, List, Beattie, W Hanlon, Jim Amos, Bill Peckham, Neville St George, Dick Moisley, Hall, J Payne and R Jenkinson from Auckland City.

== National competitions ==
=== Northern Union Cup ===
Auckland held the Northern Union Cup at the end of the season. Auckland won the trophy by defeating South Auckland 22–3 in June before defeating Canterbury 66–26 in Auckland to defend the trophy.

=== Inter-district competition ===
Otago traveled to Auckland in September, being defeated 42–22 at Carlaw Park.

Jim Amos, Roy Hardgrave, Craddock Dufty, Allan Seagar, Hec Brisbane, Len Scott and Claude List represented Auckland while Canterbury included Ted Spillane. Otago included Bert Eckhoff.

== Club competitions ==
=== Auckland ===
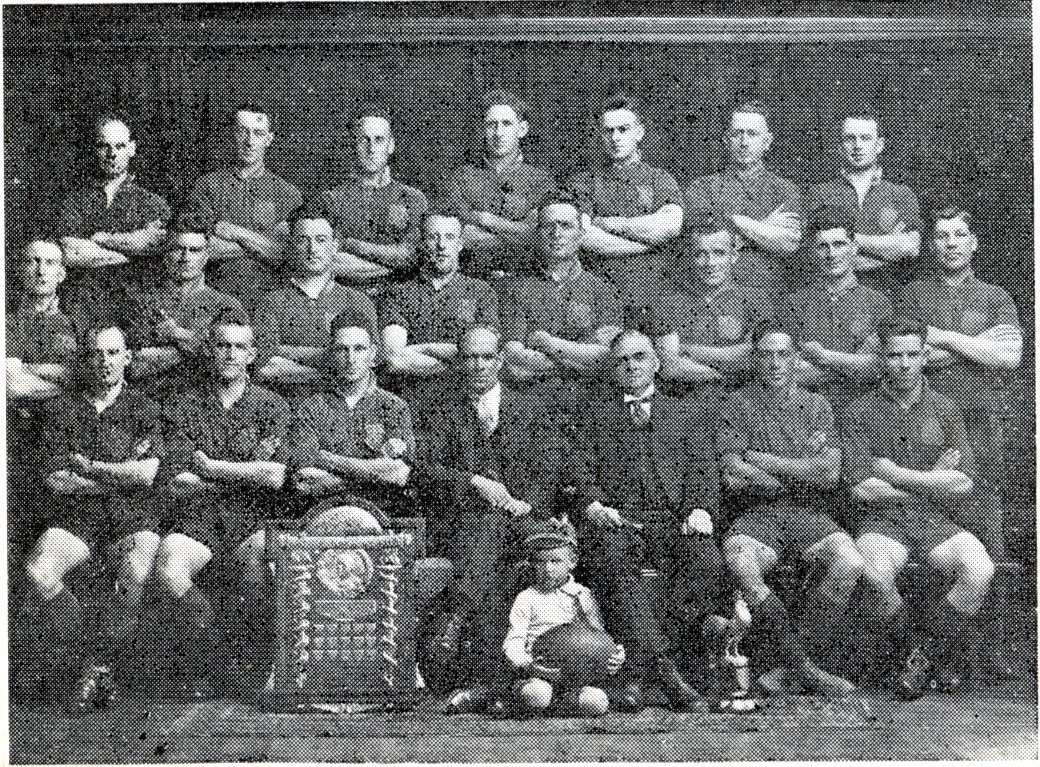
Marist in 1928

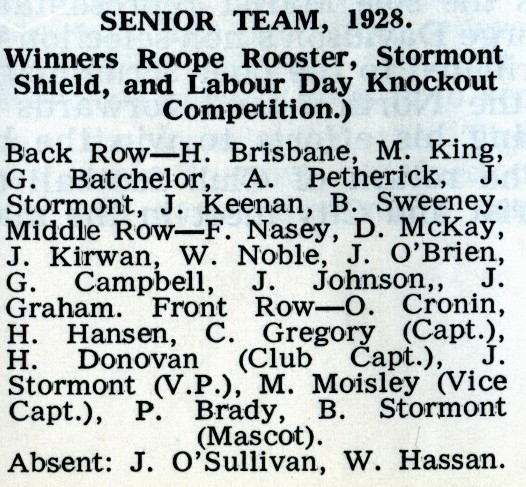

Devonport won the Auckland Rugby League's competition. Marist won the Roope Rooster, Stormont Shield and Labour Day Knockout Competitions. Grafton Athletic won the Norton Cup.

Jim Amos played for City. Marist included Hec Brisbane, Jack Kirwan, Jim O'Brien, Gordon Campbell, captain Charles Gregory and Wilf Hassan.

=== Wellington ===
Hutt won the Wellington Rugby League's Appleton Shield.

=== Canterbury ===
Marist Old Boys won the Canterbury Rugby League's McKeon Cup.

Marist Old Boys defeated Greymouth Marist 22–13 to win the Thacker Shield.

=== Other Competitions ===
The Hikurangi Rugby Club withdrew from the North Auckland rugby union competition in 1928, helping to establish rugby league in Northland. The Northland rugby league team first played in 1929.

Marist Old Boys defeated the Otago Rugby League's Christian Brothers 17–10 to win the Gore Cup.
