= 1927 New Zealand rugby league season =

Seasons
- ← 1926 1928 →

The 1927 New Zealand rugby league season was the 20th season of rugby league that had been played in New Zealand.

== International competitions ==
New Zealand returned from their disastrous 1926-1927 tour of Great Britain that saw seven players banned for life by the New Zealand Rugby League for strike action. The "Auckland All Blacks" lost to Auckland 24–21 at Carlaw Park in April after the teams return.

== National competitions ==
=== Northern Union Cup ===
South Auckland held the Northern Union Cup at the end of the season after they defeated Auckland 29–12.

Auckland had toured with the trophy in September, defeating Canterbury 24–13 at Monica Park, West Coast-Buller 44–15 at Greymouth, Otago 20–13 at Dunedin and Wellington 41–23 at Wellington. Auckland also defeated Buller, who included Vern Goodall, 60–33.

=== Inter-district competition ===
Canterbury toured the West Coast, playing the West Coast at Greymouth, Buller at Westport and Inangahua at Reefton.

During the season Otago defeated the West Coast. They were not to repeat this feat until 1998.

The Auckland squad included Craddock Dufty, Charles Gregory, G Wade, M Little, Claude List, J Wilson, captain Maurice Wetherill, Stan Webb, H McIntyre, Jim O'Brien, Wally Somers, Horace Dixon, Lou Hutt, Trevor Hall, J Payne, Alan Clarke and Nelson Bass while South Auckland included Tom Timms, James Jones and Bob Stephenson. Auckland were selected by Ernie Asher, Edward Fox and Alan Blakey.

== Club competitions ==
=== Auckland ===
Newton won the Auckland Rugby League's competition and the Stormont Shield. They defeated Ponsonby 6-3 before 13,000 fans to win the Championship. Richmond won the Roope Rooster while Ellerslie won the Norton Cup.

The Mount Albert Lions were founded in 1927, splitting from this Marist club.

A primary school management committee was set up consisting of delegates from Newmarket, Otahuhu, Papatoetoe, Richmond, Onehunga School and Onehunga Convent. Otahuhu were coached by Jim Clark and won the inaugural competition.

Newton included Craddock Dufty, Alan Clarke, Trevor Hall and Wally Somers while Marist included Charles Gregory. Claude List played for Kingsland, Lou Hutt for Ponsonby and Maurice Wetherill and Nelson Bass for City. Devonport included Stan Webb, Jim O'Brien and Horace Dixon.

=== Wellington ===
Hutt won the Wellington Rugby League's Appleton Shield.

=== Canterbury ===
Hornby won the Canterbury Rugby League's McKeon Cup.

Marist Old Boys defeated Greymouth Marist 14–12 to win the Thacker Shield.

=== Other Competitions ===
Hornby won the Gore Cup, defeating Athletic from the Otago Rugby League, 19–5.
