= Roy Hardgrave =

NZ international rugby league player

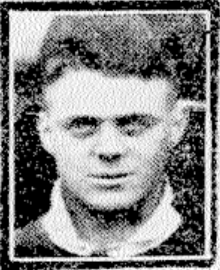

Personal information
- Full name: Roy Arthur Hardgrave
- Born: 28 July 1906 New Plymouth, New Zealand
- Died: February 1982 (aged 75) Whangaparaoa Peninsula, Auckland, New Zealand

Playing information
- Height: 5 ft 7 in (1.70 m)
- Weight: 11 st 7 lb (73 kg)

Rugby league
- Position: Centre, Wing
Club
Years	Team	Pld	T	G	FG	P
1924–29	Newton Rangers	55	38	4	0	122
1929–34	St Helens	212	173	0	0	519
1934	Newton Rangers	2	0	0	0	0
1934	Mount Albert United	2	4	0	0	12
1934	Ponsonby XIII	1	1	0	0	3
1934–38	York	89	52	0	0	156
1938	Toulouse
1938–39	Mount Albert United	24	17	0	0	51
1941	Newton Rangers	2	0	0	0	0
	Total	387	285	4	0	863
Representative
Years	Team	Pld	T	G	FG	P
1925–27	Auckland B	3	1	1	0	5
1925–39	Auckland	11	17	1	0	53
1928–39	Auckland Trial	2	1	0	0	3
1928	North Island	1	2	0	0	6
1928	New Zealand	3	0	0	0	0
1930–33	Other Nationalities	2	1	0	0	3
1939	Auckland Pakeha	1	0	0	0	0

Rugby union
- Position: Centre
Club
Years	Team	Pld	T	G	FG	P
1927	Tramways	5	1	1	0	6

Coaching information
Club
Years	Team	Gms	W	D	L	W%
1941–43	Newton Rangers	48	15	1	32	31
- Source: https://paperspast.natlib.govt.nz/newspapers, https://www.rugbyleaguerecords.com/
- Father: Arthur Hardgrave

Roy Arthur Hardgrave (28 July 1906 – February 1982) was a rugby league player. He represented New Zealand rugby league team in 3 tests in 1928. In the process he became the 189th player to represent New Zealand. Hardgrave also played for Newton Rangers, St Helens (Heritage No. 379), Mount Albert United, York, and Toulouse rugby league clubs, along with the North Island, and Auckland representative sides. His father Arthur Hardgrave also represented New Zealand from 1912 to 1914.

== Early life ==
Roy Arthur Hardgrave was born in New Plymouth on 28 July 1906. His parents were Una George Hardgrave and Arthur Hardgrave. He also had a brother, Edgar Louis who was one year his junior, born on 1 October 1907. Roy's father, Arthur, was a prominent rugby player in the Taranaki area before switching to rugby league and representing the first ever Taranaki team in 1908. The Hardgrave family moved to Auckland in 1912, where he joined the Manukau club. Arthur represented Auckland, and New Zealand from 1912 to 1914.

== Playing career ==
=== Manukau rugby league club ===
Roy Hardgrave's "first football was played at Onehunga when he captained his school team to victory on many occasions. On leaving school he followed in the footsteps of his father, who had made football history, and played juniors for the Manukau club". In 1922 and 1923 Hardgrave was playing for the Manukau rugby league club's 6th grade side. In the same team was Cyril Brimble, whose younger brothers Ted Brimble, Walter Brimble, and Wilfred Brimble all went on to represent New Zealand, and Hardgrave's younger brother Edgar. By 1924 he had moved up into the 4th grade side. In July 1924 the entire Manukau club switched to rugby union after becoming unhappy with their treatment by the Auckland Rugby League. Soon after Hardgrave joined the Otahuhu Rovers club where he played for their fifth grade side. In a match against Northcote & Birkenhead Ramblers he scored 2 tries and kicked 4 goals in a 17–7 win.

=== Newton Rangers ===
Late in the 1924 season Hardgrave moved to the Newton Rangers club which is an inner city suburb of Auckland. He played in their 5th grade side initially but made his senior debut on 4 October in a round 1 match for the Roope Rooster knockout competition. Teams often debuted younger players in this competition which took place late in the year. He scored both of Newton's tries in a 17–8 loss to rivals City Rovers which ended their season. The Auckland Star misspelled his name as "Hargreaves" which was a common misspelling in the early years of his career. His first try came when he "dribbled the ball over the line, and ran on to score". The second came after Arthur Mansill took an intercept and Hardgrave ran in support, taking the pass before "scoring a brilliant try near the posts".

Over the summer Hardgrave competed in athletic competitions including the Athletic Club Sports day which was held at Waiuku to mark their anniversary day. In the 75 yards handicap he was awarded a five and a half yard handicap. He did not place, though his teammate Arthur Mansill ran second.

In 1925 he became a regular in the Newton senior side, playing in 11 matches and scoring 4 tries. In a round 2 championship match against City Rovers on 9 May he was involved in a try after combining with Clarrie Polson "in a clever passing movement" with Alan Clarke scoring. The New Zealand Herald said that Hardgrave was a "young player who showed promise". The Herald again mentioned him following the match against Richmond Rovers on 16 May when they said that he was a "good player… who shows cleverness when attacking". In a loss a week later to Marist Old Boys the Auckland Star said that he played "a great game". In the next round against Devonport United at the Devonport Domain he scored a brilliant try after collecting a kick from Devonport's Bert Laing he "performed the neatest piece of work in the game by making a clear dash through to score between the posts". The Herald reported later in the week that he had gone off injured in the second half which affected the closeness of the match. They also said that his "form was brilliant. Last season Hargreaves [sic] played in the fifth grade, and although very small, is one of the most promising players in the league game". Newton were struggling with 6 losses to start the season but they secured their first win against Athletic on 13 June with a 38–11 win at Victoria Park, with Hardgrave scoring 2 tries. The Star reported that he "stood out on the Newton side, and he was ably supported by Polson and [Wally] Somers".

Following his strong form Hardgrave was named to play in one of the five eighths positions for the Auckland A team to play Auckland B in a trial match. It was to be a curtain raiser to the North Island v South Island match at Carlaw Park on 27 June to help the New Zealand selectors choose the squad to tour Australia. His ‘A Team’ lost the match 5–0 though the Herald stated that "the Newton colt,… upheld the reputation that his club claims for him. He certainly shows great promise". Hardgrave missed selection to the tour which was perhaps unsurprising given his young age and relative inexperience however he was chosen to make his Auckland debut in a match against the New Zealand side which was soon to depart. He was paired with Hector Cole in the five eighths, who had been his partner there in the trial match also. Auckland lost 16–9 at Carlaw Park on 2 July.

He then returned to his Newton side and played 5 more matches for them, scoring a try, although it was awarded after he was obstructed in their final match of the season against Ponsonby United on 1 August. Overall it was an unhappy season for Newton, winning just 1 match and coming last in the Monteith Shield first grade championship. Hardgrave was then chosen as an "emergency player" for Auckland's match against South Auckland on 19 August but he did not take the field. He was also chosen as an emergency player for Auckland B's match with New Zealand and for their southern tour where they would play West Coast in Greymouth. His final game of the season came for Auckland B against Wellington on 16 September where he scored a try and kicked a conversion in a 68–9 thrashing at Newtown Park in Wellington.

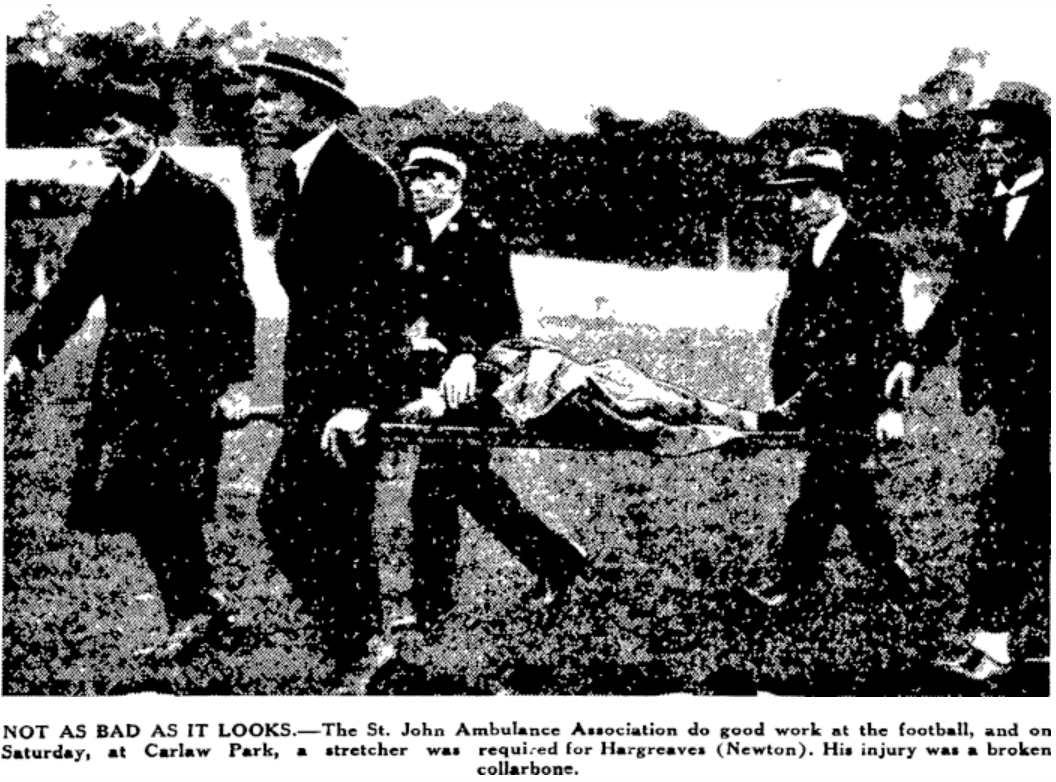

The 1926 season saw Hardgrave play 10 matches for Newton, scoring 3 tries. Newton fared slightly better than the previous season, winning 3 games but still only managing 6th place of 7 teams. During the round 4 match with Richmond Rovers on 15 May he allegedly broke his collarbone though it was later reported that he had just received a bad kick to that part of his body. The Auckland Star said "he went down gamely to stop a Richmond rush when the suburban vanguard had a full head of steam up, and when he lay writhing on the ground there was a rush to help him. The first diagnosis was a broken collarbone. He was carried off on a stretcher, but a further inspection revealed that Hargreaves [sic] had sustained a kick on the shoulder, and that his collarbone had escaped". There was a photograph of him on the stretcher published in the newspapers. He did however miss three weeks and did not return to play until Newton's round 7 match against Devonport on 12 June. A week later he scored 2 tries in Newton's 34–20 loss to City Rovers. Hardgrave was then chosen in the reserves for the Auckland A v Auckland B trial at Carlaw Park on 10 July but did not take the field. He also showed that he was nearing selection for Auckland when he was pulled into the squad to meet Otago on 7 August after his Newton teammate Alan Clarke informed selectors he would be unavailable. He then finished the season playing 4 more matches for Newton with the last being their round 1 loss in the Roope Rooster loss to Richmond.

=== Tramways rugby union club and Auckland RL debut ===
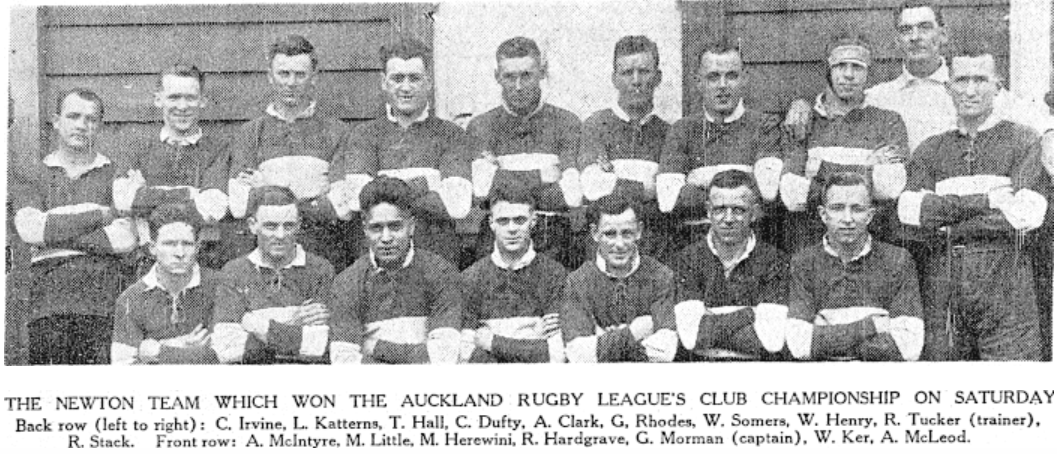

1927 saw Hardgrave play 12 matches for Newton and his try scoring ability began to show through with him registering 7 tries. Newton also had a remarkable turn around in their fortunes when they went from second to last in 1926 to first, winning the championship for the first time since 1912. They contained current New Zealand players Craddock Dufty and Wally Somers, and future New Zealand representatives Alan Clarke, Trevor Hall, and of course Hardgrave.

In April it was reported that Hardgrave had been granted reinstatement to rugby union. He played 5 matches for the Tramways senior side in the B Division of Auckland club rugby scoring a try in one match and kicking a penalty in another from April 30 to May 28. He then returned to rugby league and played in Newton's May 7, round 5 match against Marist Old Boys where he scored a try. It came after a break by Craddock Dufty with A. McLeod and Hardgrave in support, "finally Hardgrave, after sending to McLeod, gathered an in-pass perfectly to go across and score". Despite this moment, however, the Auckland Star noted that "Dufty, Hardgrave, and McLeod all showed up, but they had no real combination, and until they learn to get the ball swiftly to the wings, one cannot see Newton getting points commensurate with the work of a good pack in front of them". The New Zealand Herald also stated that "Hargreaves [sic] and McLeod were below form at five-eighths. Both appeared to have little understanding on attack". After their round 8 match with Richmond it was said that "Little and Hardgrave stood out with brilliant dash in attack, their work carried sting right through the game". Hardgrave was playing on the left wing now and scored a try in a 19–11 win. He followed this up with tries in consecutive games against Ponsonby, City, and Marist. The try against Marist was particularly brilliant, where the Star wrote "[Jim] O'Brien passed to [Jack] Kirwan, for Knott. Hardgrave flashed into the gap, intercepted the pass, and tossed his head back. A growing crescendo from the Newton supporters turned into a roar as the tricky Newton wing stranded [Charles] Gregory in a lightning side-step to sail in unopposed. It was a single-handed try, fitting reward to daring opportunism". Two weeks later after wins over Marist and Grafton Athletic the Star said he "possesses a big burst of speed and is a dangerous scoring man" After another win over Devonport Newton needed to beat Ponsonby in a playoff for the championship. They won the match 6–3 before a large crowd of 12,000 at Carlaw Park on 27 August. Hardgrave "shone in defence and was reliable on attack". Newton were knocked out of the Roope Rooster competition in the first round but by virtue of their championship win they qualified for the Stormont Shield, which they won 25–14 over Richmond in a match which featured multiple serious injuries. Hardgrave scored a try despite getting "few chances … but his play was reliable throughout".

After Hardgrave's impressive form he was named in the reserves for the Auckland team to play South Auckland (which was essentially northern Waikato) on 15 October, although it was their final match of the season. However, on the day he started on the wing and scored a try in a 29–12 loss at Carlaw Park before 4,000 spectators. It was said that he "played brightly on attack". At the end of the season Hardgrave's father Arthur led an 'old timers' team in a charitable match for the unemployed at Carlaw Park.

=== North Island selection ===
The 1928 season was the most prolific try scoring year of his career on New Zealand soil. In 14 matches for Newton he scored 13 tries and in his 6 appearances for Auckland he scored an astonishing 13 tries, along with kicking a conversion. His first 3 matches of the season saw him moving around positionally for Newton. In a preseason benefit match against Ponsonby he "played soundly at centre and should be a success if played regularly in this position". The match was to raise money for Hardgrave's former teammate Dick Stack, who had had his leg amputated after being seriously injured in the final match of the previous season. His time at centre was short lived however as he then played halfback in their round 1, 18–10 loss to Richmond. And then was back on the wing for round 2 against Devonport United. He set up Newton's final try with "lightning side-stepping [which] stranded a trio of the Shore backs, and a wide pass sent Murray in at the flag", however Newton fell short 12–11. He had a 2 try performance against Ellerslie United on 19 May, and scored another on 9 June against Marist; the Star said that "Hardgrave, who is quick as lightning off the mark and can work in a small space, did some brilliant things".

Hardgrave was then selected for the Auckland side in the reserves to play South Auckland (north Waikato) on 16 June, however, like the season prior he did in fact take the field in the starting line up. This came after Maurice Wetherill and Charles Gregory didn't play and the entire back line was necessarily reshuffled. He scored a try in a 16–3 win in which he and Len Scott were said to be "ideal wings in the three-quarter line". And he "was prominent for some bright dashes and made the best of any opportunities which came his way". His try came early in the match when he "outpaced the opposition, to score at the corner" to give Auckland a 3–0 lead.

Hardgrave returned to the Newton side and in a 17–13 win over Richmond he scored a try; the Star said "the greyhound of the Newton team swerved out clear of Turton, cut trenchantly to beat a converging tackle and then sailed across for a spectacular try". They also reported later in the week that "on his form [he] looks like being a certainty for future rep. teams. On two occasions when the Newton defence was broken only Hardgrave’s great pace saved his side". Then on 30 June in a 23–16 win over Devonport he scored 3 tries and was involved in several others. His first try came after he "cleverly beat two of the opposition and then easily eluded Stan Webb" to score. The second was described as "the most brilliant try of the season" after he took a cross kick from Craddock Dufty and "gathered possession and outpaced and swerved past several opponents to score", while his third came after Dufty handled to send him over in the corner. The New Zealand Herald said "Hardgrave was the hero of the match, his clever side-stepping and swerving leaving the opposition standing several times. The spectators were not slow in showing their appreciation of Hardgrave's cleverness, and he was given a rousing reception when he ran practically the length of the field to score a beautiful try". The Auckland Star afterwards said that "at the moment Hardgrave stands alone as Auckland’s most brilliant wing three-quarter, a speed merchant who would probably cause a sensation on the Sydney Cricket Ground, where they have memories of Nigel Barker, Harold Horder, and other men of great pace in the past".

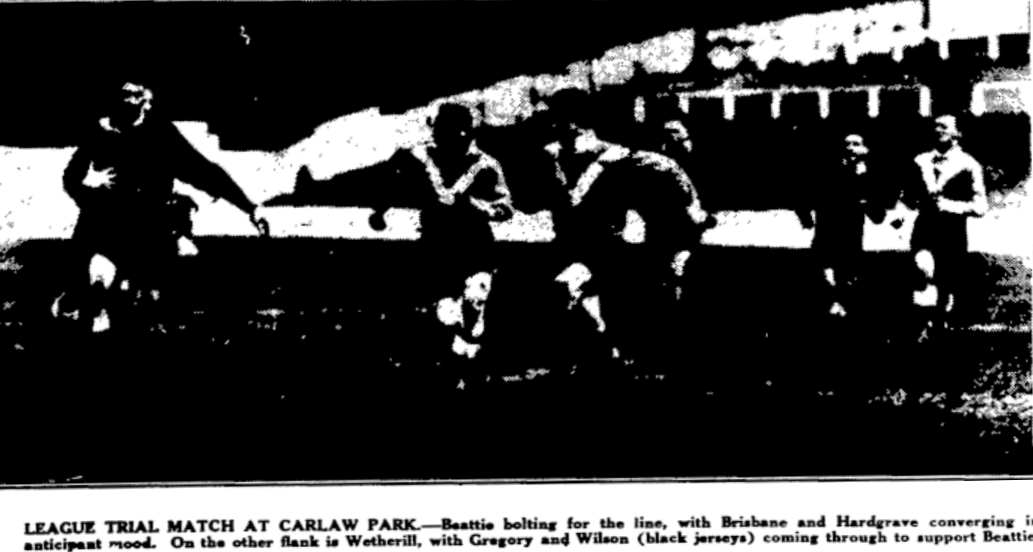
Hardgrave in the centre covering across to tackle Beattie in the trial match at Carlaw Park

Unsurprisingly Hardgrave was selected for the Auckland trial on 11 July and he scored a try for the Possibles in a 24–14 win over the Probables. After a match against Ellerslie United on 14 July Hardgrave was chosen to practice in preparation for an Auckland match against Canterbury on 21 July. He was then chosen for the match day side in the three-quarters along with Claude List, and Maurice Wetherill. Auckland thrashed Canterbury 66–26 at Carlaw Park before a crowd of 15,000 with Hardgrave scoring an impressive 5 tries. His first was Auckland's 4th try when he "sailed along the touch-line, swerved in-field to beat O’Connell, and then raced away to score a spectacular try behind the posts". He scored again soon after diving on a ball after messy play by Canterbury, while his third came just before half time after Frank Delgrosso had got an attacking movement going that saw Hardgrave run in unopposed. His fourth try came after all the Auckland backs handled and finished with Hardgrave outpacing the remaining defence, and his fifth came at the end of the game to round out the scoring. Hardgrave scored again for Auckland in a midweek match against South Auckland (northern Waikato) in a match which Auckland lost 19–17.

Hardgrave's outstanding form then saw him chosen for the North Island side to play the South Island at Carlaw Park on 28 July. He played in the three-quarters along with Hec Brisbane and Stan Raynor (of Waikato) and the North Island won comfortably by 44 points to 8. Hardgrave scored twice, the first coming after Wetherill "cleverly intercepted and there was a roar from the crowd when he raced ahead with Hardgrave in support. Coming to Blazey, he gave the pass at the right moment to the fleet Newton winger, who outpaced the opposition and scored behind the posts" and with Delgrosso converting the score was 10–3. His other try came when the North passed well "and Hardgrave was sent away to score behind the posts".

=== New Zealand selection ===
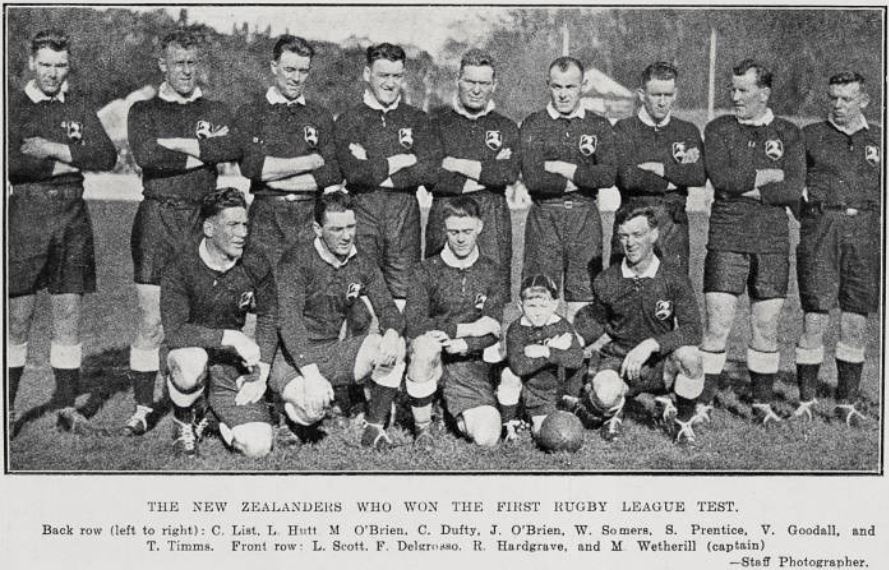
NZ 1st test team at Carlaw Park on 4 August 1928

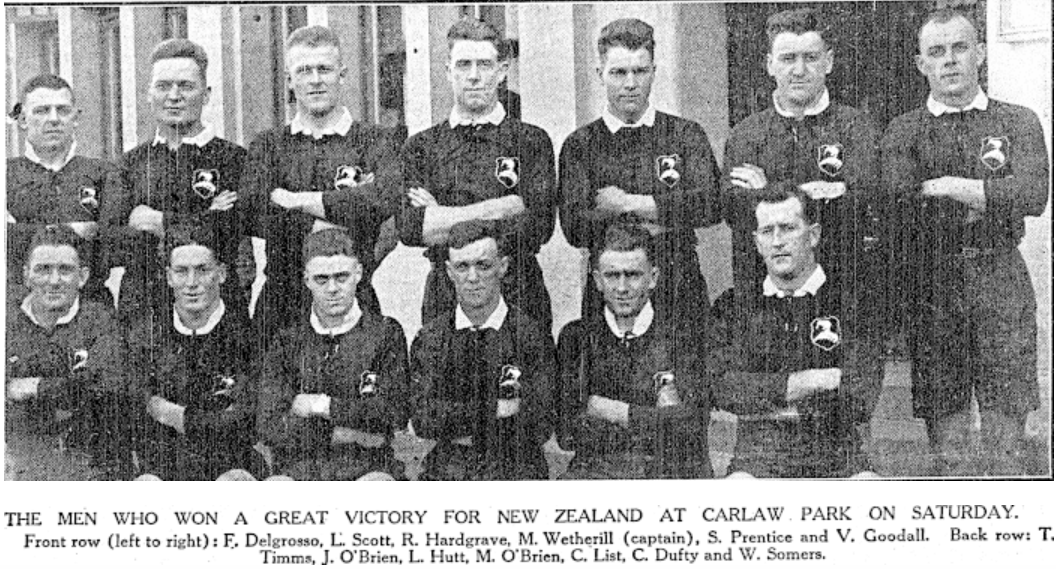

Following his 2 try performance for the North Island, Hardgrave was chosen to make his debut for New Zealand in the first test against England on 4 August at Carlaw Park. He played on the wing with Claude List and Len Scott the other three-quarters (who were also on debut), and the experienced Craddock Dufty behind them at fullback. New Zealand won the match 17–13 before a record crowd of 27,000. The Star after the match said that "beyond an occasional glimpse of great speed, Hardgrave, the Dominion greyhound, rarely got into the spotlight, much for the reason that the play rarely came his way". The Herald stated that "the New Zealand three quarters played right up to their best form, Hardgrave showing good anticipation, which almost resulted in two tries". Early in the match with the score 4–3 in favour of New Zealand "Hardgrave saved brilliantly on one occasion when the attack looked dangerous". Then later with the score 11–3 there was "passing among the English backs transferred play to the New Zealand line, where [Alf] Ellaby was well grassed by Hardgrave".

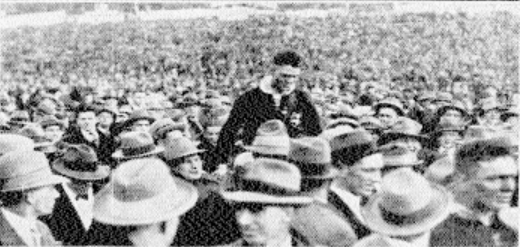
Hardgrave being carried off by spectators after the 1st test win at Carlaw Park

Hardgrave was chosen again for the second test to be played in Dunedin on 11 August. The back line was unchanged aside from Claude List being replaced by Hec Brisbane. England won 13–5 to level the series in a match that became infamous for its rough play with it descending into a series of fights. The Telegraph said "at the end football as a game was absent, the spectators merely waiting for the commencement of the next bout of fighting. One Englishman was ordered off (Burgess), but three or four players on each side should have suffered the same penalty". In the second half with the score 7–5 to England "Hargrave put in a good dash down the line to the English corner, but the ball went out behind" after he had chased a long kick by Dufty. Late in the match with the score 10–5 "the visitors came back with clever passing rushes, good play by Hardgrave saving the situation". Though eventually after England remained on attack for some time Frank Bowen scored a try which sealed the match.

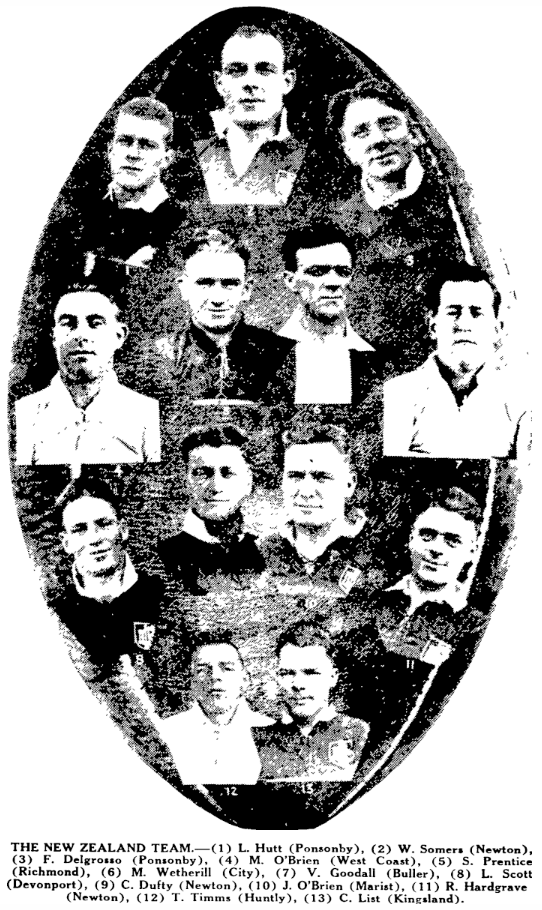
The New Zealand team of 1928 to play England

He was again chosen for the third test team to play in Christchurch on 25 August in an unchanged back line. England won a far cleaner match 6–5 to win the series in front of 15,000 spectators. With the score 2–0 to New Zealand "Hardgrave made a great run, Wetherill, Brisbane, and Prenctice carrying on", though an infringement near the line ended the movement.

Following the series the English had said that "Hardgrave had impressed with his great pace and clean swerve". He then moved back into the Newton side for the remainder of the season. He played at five eighth against Marist on 1 September, scoring a try, and then a week later against City in a 25–16 win he scored 3 tries, including one where "with dazzling pace and side-step Hardgrave riddled the City defence, and veering infield, got across in a good position". His third came late in the match when at midfield he received the ball and "swerved inside Len Barchard, and was clean away. Hopelessly outpacing the opposition the Newton greyhound finished behind the posts". He was then chosen on the wing for Auckland in their Northern Union Cup match against Otago on 15 September. He scored three tries in a 42–22 win at Carlaw Park. He opened Auckland's scoring with an amazing try. The Herald said "Hardgrave treated the spectators to a great side-stepping exhibition. Gathering the ball at halfway from loose play, the wing three quarter eluded at least seven visiting players, including the fullback, to score behind the posts". His second try came soon after while his third was midway through the second half though these were both simple tries where he ran in unopposed.

In a Roope Rooster semi final replay match against Ponsonby after the first was drawn 5–5, Hardgrave scored a spectacular try. With play at midfield the "Ponsonby backs began a blind side passing move, which promised well. It was when a long pass was given that Hardgrave flashed into the picture with brilliant interception, and he was racing Delgrosso, the Ponsonby full-back, before the others grasped the situation. With a full knowledge of Hardgrave’s pace and ability to in swerve, Delgrosso made a special effort to get his man, and would probably have done so had not the Newton flier at the peak of the swerve interpolated a jump which got him clear of Delgrosso's tackle. He got full acceleration again before a chasing tackle by Crooks could land him, and the rest was merely a gallop with an open field ahead. Hardgrave is idolised by the Newton supporters, and they gave him a great ovation". His next representative match came on 6 October against Northland at Kensington Park in Whangārei. Auckland won 33–9 before a crowd of 1,000. Hardgrave continued his try scoring form, notching 2 and he also converted his second. His last representative game of the season was for a relatively weak Auckland side who travelled down to Huntly to play South Auckland. Auckland lost 21–7 and there was no reporting of any of the scoring from the match. His final match of the season was in a loss for Newton in a Labour Day tournament match against Richmond. He scored Newton's only try.

=== Final season in Auckland ===
In 1929 Hardgrave was involved in several athletic meetings during the summer including the Bombay Sports meeting where he won his 120-yard hurdling heat but failed to place in the final. Then on 1 April he competed at the Warkworth Athletic Sports Club meeting. He won the 100 Yard Handicap in a time of 9.8 seconds, and he also won the 220 Yard Handicap in a time of 22.6 seconds. On 20 April he competed in a sports meeting at Carlaw Park involving Auckland Rugby League, Auckland Amateur Athletic and Cycle Club. In the 100 Yard race he finished third behind his New Zealand teammate Len Scott, and A. Duane.

When the club season got underway Hardgrave was chosen to captain the side. In a practice game on 20 April against Richmond he scored a try and kicked a conversion and penalty in Dufty's absence. Dufty had fallen out with the Newton club over selection issues and later left the club. Interestingly the Auckland Star stated that Hardgrave's nickname was "Shaver" just like his father's had been. In their round 1 win over Marist Hardgrave also had goal kicking duties and he converted a try but later had to go off when he "sustained a slight concussion". He was in fine try scoring form once again and crossed for a "brilliant" try against Ponsonby on 4 May, another try against Kingsland Athletic on 11 May, scoring twice against Ellerslie United and then again against City on 25 May. Then a 75m intercept try and 2 conversions followed in a win over Richmond on 8 June, and a week later in a loss to Marist he scored 2 tries and kicked a conversion.

=== Rumours of St Helens offer and confirmation of signing ===
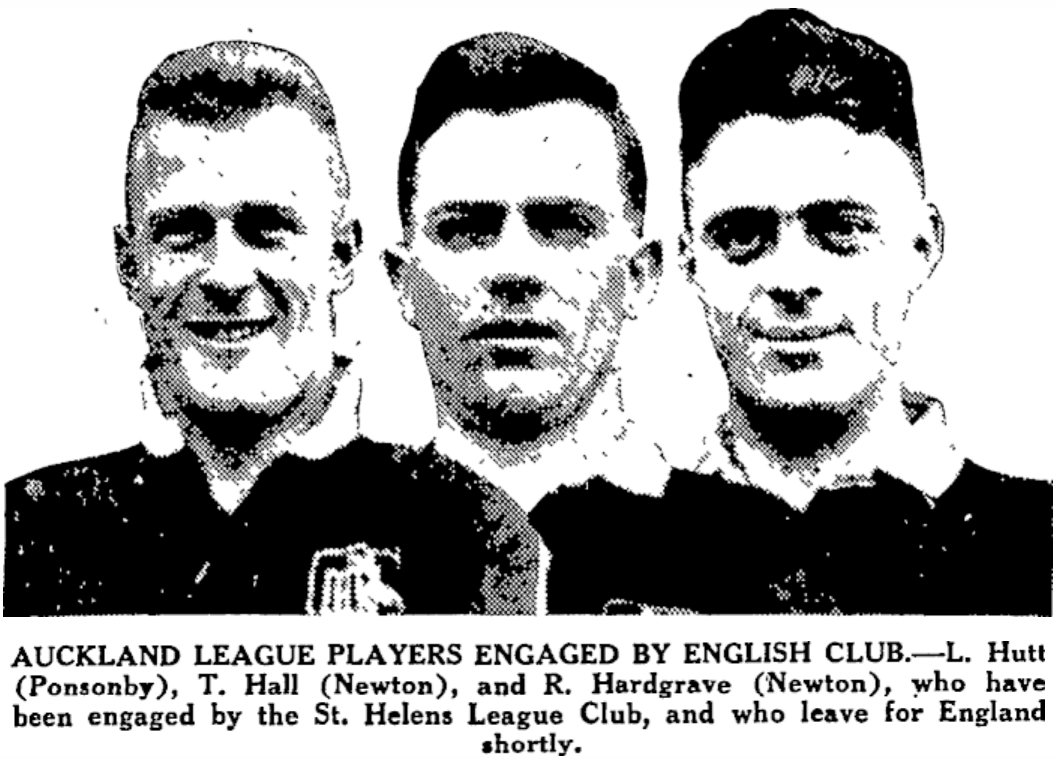

It was at this point of the 1929 season that rumours emerged that Hardgrave had received an offer from the St Helens rugby league club. On 17 June the Auckland Star reported "rumour is persistent that R. Hardgrave, the Newton league captain and flying wing three-quarter has received an offer to play for the St. Helens Club (Lancashire), but the Auckland and New Zealand representative denied, in an interview this morning, that he had received any cable from Home or been made an offer on behalf of the club in New Zealand". He was then quoted as saying "it is really marvellous where these rumours come from", "one would think that if there is anything in them I would hear first. Certainly, when the English team was in New Zealand last season I, and about four other players, were approached as to the possibility of our playing in England. Should I receive an offer and it is of advantage to myself, naturally I will consider it". Then just 4 days later it was confirmed that he had indeed received an offer and was going to England to play for St Helens. It was reported that "the terms have not been made public, but it is known that they are sufficiently attractive to interest the New Zealand representative". They also said that when he was seen in the afternoon he "was reluctant to discuss the matter, but admitted that he was giving the offer consideration".

Hardgrave was ultimately to leave New Zealand shores on 6 July on board the Shaw, Savill and Albion Line steamer, the SS Corinthic with his wife Ethel. Albert Falwasser was going to be traveling with him, having also been offered a contract but he withdrew at the last moment. Hardgrave's Newton teammate Trevor Hall had also been offered a contract with St. Helens, as had Ponsonby player Lou Hutt and they would soon join Hardgrave at St. Helens.

In his final performance for Newton on 22 June before his departure he scored a brilliant try against Ponsonby. In a side stepping run he "beat Moore and Delgrosso … to score a great try". On 26 June Newton held a farewell dance to "R. A. (Shaver) Hardgrave, who is shortly departing for England" at the Masonic Hall on Belgium Street.

Hardgrave arrived in London on 13 August along with Trevor Hall and Lou Hutt. They were met by the chairman of St. Helen's and signed contracts immediately though the terms were not announced. Then in early September it was reported that the three of them were in good form and "are expected to be included in the opening matches". By the time this news had been received however he had already made his debut in a 3–0 loss at home to Widnes on 31 August. He ultimately played 47 matches for St Helens during the 1929–30 season and scored 33 tries. On 16 November he played for St Helens against the touring Australian side. The match was drawn 18–18 with Hardgrave scoring 2 tries. The New Zealand Herald reported that "Hardgrave is the latest to impress the critics. He played a splendid game against the Australians for St. Helens". On 30 November he scored 3 tries in an 18–5 win over York with an English paper saying "[Hardgrave] was always prominent, doing useful work... [and] showed a lot of speed and anticipation". On Boxing Day he played opposite fellow New Zealander Lou Brown of Wigan. St Helens won 14 to 5 to register their first win over Wigan for 10 years and it was reported that the pair of them had a "great duel". There were 20,000 in attendance and the English papers said "Brown and Hardgrave had a great battle, which was only marred by an unpleasant incident in which Brown was the offender"... "describing the incident an English paper says:- Hardgrave got a bad bump from Brown, who deliberately turned his back and charged Hardgrave down. The New Zealander was injured. Hardgrave, however, did no questionable work in return. He beat Brown by speed, skill and football brains. The St Helens wing did some brilliant work on attack, and six times raced 60 yards, only to just miss scoring. Brown secured Wigan’s only try… at the conclusion of the game Brown was first to congratulate his fellow countryman. The unfortunate incident was soon forgotten, and the pair left the ground arm in arm".

=== Dispute over wages ===
In March 1930 it was reported that Hardgrave, Hutt, and Hall sent a claim to the St Helens secretary "demanding a guarantee of £3 10/ a week for 52 weeks regardless of their football earnings, and secondly, a guaranteed benefit and £250 each retaining fee. They declared that the work found them is unsatisfactory from a wages point of view". Their demands were rejected on the grounds that they had refused "to allow the matter to remain in abeyance until after the League Cup semi-final", and all three were omitted from the team to meet Wigan. The issue was later resolved and then in May the three were returning to New Zealand for a break before intending to go back to St Helens where they would "ask for better terms before signing on again". Hardgrave finished the 1930–31 season playing 42 games and scoring 33 tries. The following season he had an even more impressive season, scoring 44 tries from 42 games. Then in the 1932–33 season he was once again in fine form throughout the season scoring 34 tries from 46 games.

In 1933 Hardgrave suffered a rib injury in a 11–7 win over Warrington on 9 September in just the 4th round of the season. The injury was not too serious however and he only missed 2 weekends before returning. He ended up playing 36 matches and scored 30 tries. He ultimately finished his time at St Helens with an impressive 173 tries from 212 matches.

=== Return to New Zealand ===
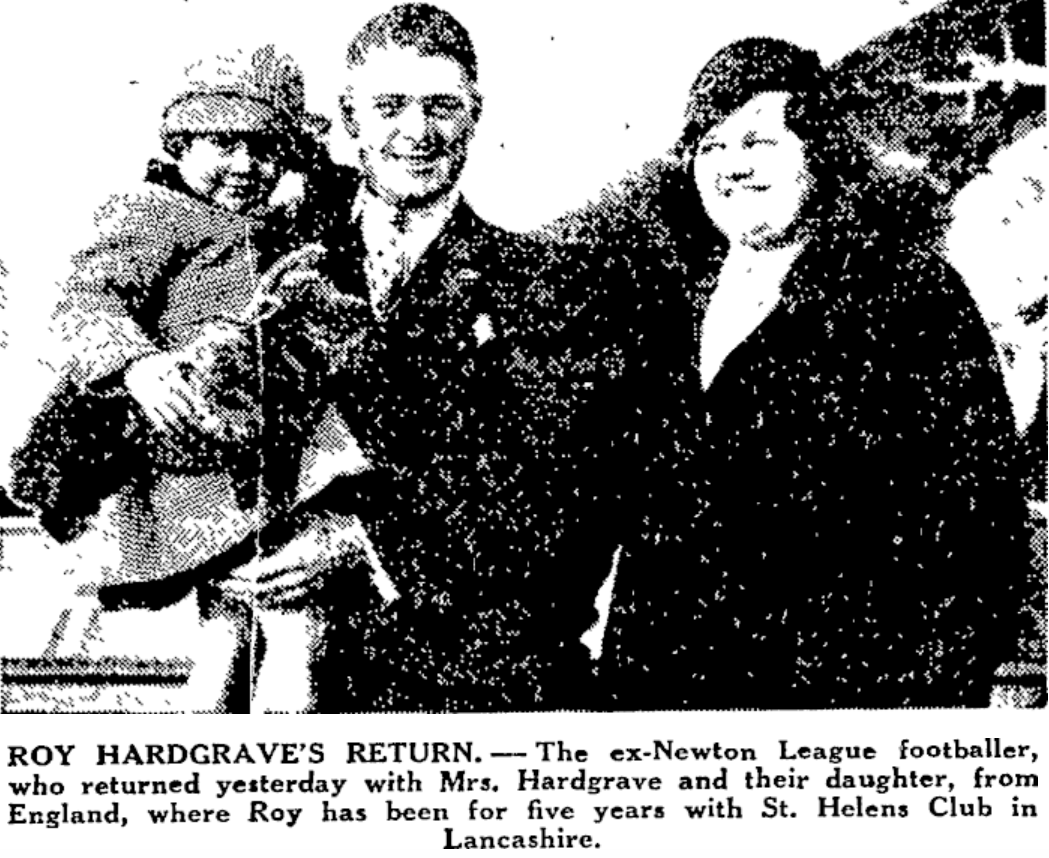
Hardgrave with his wife Ethel and daughter June after their return to New Zealand in 1934

It was reported in January 1934 that due to a sudden fall in gate takings St Helens were placing Hardgrave, English captain Alf Ellaby, and Griffin on the transfer list. Then in March 1934 it was reported that Hardgrave's contract with St Helens had finished and that he was returning to New Zealand and would likely rejoin his old Newton club. The "well known writer, G.F. Blackwell, observed that the "New Zealand greyhound" was still the greatest match-winner in the game".

Hardgrave was expected back in New Zealand on 9 June, traveling on the Hobson Bay en route to Auckland. Surprisingly the St. Helens Club considered that it would "have a claim for £200 from the Rangers" as he was a registered player with St Helens still. In the same article however it was stated that "St. Helens Club has no right to £200 in respect of Hardgrave, either from the Newton Club or from the New Zealand Council, which is the body which has the agreement with England. Apart from the fact that Hardgrave is still on the Newton register, and when he went to England had neither a clearance not a transfer, the council has ruled, the embargo, since made, did not apply to New Zealanders who were in England at the time the agreement was arranged. So far the Newton Club has received no official demand from the St. Helens Club".

Hardgrave and his wife and 4-year-old daughter (June) arrived back on the Aorangi on 24 June. They were met at the wharf by relatives, friends, including players, and officials of the Newton club. Newton held a dance for Hardgrave on Tuesday, 26 June at the Society of Arts Hall on Kitchener Street was filled to capacity with over 500 people in attendance. Epi Shalfoon's Melody Boys from Rotorua who were a pioneering jazz band at the time, provided the entertainment. The club patron M. J. Hooper spoke as did Mr. E. Stallworthy of the NZRL, Mr. E.J. Phelan, deputy chairman of the ARL, ARL secretary Ivan Culpan, and Mr. John A. Lee (M.P.). Hardgrave was presented with a statuette of an athlete with inscription, Mrs. Hardgrave with a "writing companion", and their daughter June with a "toy dog worked in Newton Rangers colours". Hardgrave in acknowledging the tributes said that he had not yet definitely determined his activities, but with him the Newton club stood foremost while in Auckland. He was particularly delighted to find that his St. Helens club colleague Trevor Hall had been doing so much for the club since he returned".

On 4 July at the Auckland Rugby League weekly meeting Hardgrave was welcomed back. It was also discussed as to how the league could use Hardgrave's knowledge of the game in England to help advance the sport in Auckland. Chairman Mr. G. Grey Campbell strongly recommended that "advantage be taken of an offer made by the returned player" to instruct coaches, clubs and players as to the methods adopted in England. Then "on the motion of Mr. William (Bill) Mincham, seconded my Mr. Rukutai, it was decided to specially retain Hardgrave for the purpose stated. The intention was for Hardgrave to not replace regular club coaches or officials, but to help in an active advisory capacity". Hardgrave made his return to the playing field days later against Marist. The league had placed an advertisement in the newspapers advertising his return stating "Hardgrave, who has just returned to N.Z., is reckoned to be the finest wing-three quarter in the world playing league football... come and see this world champion in action". Newton won the match 9–8 but Hardgrave was not very involved with the ball going to his wing rarely. Brady who played inside him was accused of not moving the ball on to Hardgrave on 3 occasions when Hardgrave had opportunities to score.

At a meeting of the Auckland Rugby League Referees on 9 July, Hardgrave "gave a general explanation of the rules and interpretations as he found the different points applied in England". Devonport, Richmond, and City all then advised the Auckland Rugby League of their "desire" to receive a lecture from Hardgrave in his role as the "advisory coach".

A notice appeared in the 20 July edition of the Auckland Star that the Publican's License for the Market Hotel on Grey Street was intending to being transferred from John Patrick Malloy to Roy Arthur Hardgrave. The transfer of the license was approved on 5 September.

He played a further match for Newton against Richmond on 14 July but then failed to play in their match with City the following weekend nor Devonport the weekend after. He was then selected to play for Auckland against Northland on 11 August. The Herald wrote that Hardgrave "has played in only two club games and is fortunate to be chosen in preference to others who have played throughout the season". Auckland won the match 19–12 at Carlaw Park, played on 11 August. Hardgrave was said to have "put in some attractive runs, but the ball rarely reached him until he was almost cramped to the touchline".

=== Controversial transfer to Mount Albert United ===
It turned out that Hardgrave's failure to play in Newton's match against City on 21 July had come about because of a dispute with the club selector (Mr. McGregor). Hardgrave had claimed that he had only agreed to play for Newton in the left wing three quarter position and the selector wanted him to play centre. Hardgrave's argument was that "if he did not prove successful in the centre it might prejudice him in the event of his possible return to England". McGregor said that "as sole selector he had a right to place a player in any position he deemed best... and was not aware of any agreement giving Hardgrave the right to dictate. The majority of the team reportedly supported the selector and continued to play. However it was also reported that a "schism occurred among the Newton club officials on the question, and several resigned". Three of Newton's players, Claude Dempsey, A. Allen, and C. Merrick had all been granted transfers to the new Mount Albert United club after being approved by the former club board. The new Newton board notified the Auckland Rugby League control board of their intention to appeal the transfers.

Hardgrave took the field for Mount Albert United on the same day that the controversy was reported in a round 1 Roope Rooster loss to Ponsonby. Hardgrave scored a try in the loss. His transfer, along with the other 3 players was approved days later at the control board meeting. Hardgrave was injured in the match and did not play the following weekend against his former Newton side.

Hardgrave then went on an end of season tour to Napier with the Mount Albert side and against Taradale and Taradale Park he scored 3 tries in a 22–12 win. His final match of the season was in fact as a guest player for a Ponsonby XIII against the touring Western Suburbs side from Sydney. They had won the New South Wales championship weeks earlier. Ponsonby lost the match 26–13 with Hardgrave scoring one try between the posts which after the conversion narrowed the score to 18–13. His "speed saved Ponsonby on several occasions, but the St. Helens winger was looking too much for the opening that came only once to be impressive".

=== Return to England, joining York ===
On 11 October it was reported that Hardgrave along with Leonard Schultz had signed for York in England. They were booked to leave by the Tainui steamer on 17 October and would arrive in England around 23 November which would be in time for the Christmas and cup tie fixtures. Hardgrave reported that he "much regretted the misunderstanding in which he recently became involved and particularly he desired to contradict a suggestion that he had been financed by the Auckland League or any club to return to New Zealand recently. He had intended to come back here for the trip, in any case, for the benefit of Mrs. Hardgrave and their child, who would be returning with him to York". Hardgrave did not divulge the terms of his deal but he "expected to be under contract for four years". Both players were given a farewell by the Mount Albert club on the Saturday prior to their departure. He arrived in Southampton on 2 November to resume his professional career in England. While there he was also employed at the Fields Star Inn on Liverpool Road in St Helens.

Hardgrave was in good form for York immediately and in early April it was reported that through 8 matches he had scored 12 tries, including 6 tries in a single match against Bramley, followed by 2 more against Batley. He would ultimately score 20 tries in 18 games in his first season with York. In the 1935–36 season he scored 23 tries in 38 games though the following season he played just 27 games scoring 7 tries, then in his final season with them he scored 2 tries in 6 games before transferring to French club Toulouse. His final match for York was against the touring Australian side on 22 September in a 15–6 loss. The following month he was placed on the transfer list at his own request.

=== Transfer to Toulouse in France ===
Hardgrave signed for Toulouse in late December 1937 and made his debut for them in January. He ultimately only spent 4 months with the club, with his last game for them in May.

=== Return to New Zealand, and Mount Albert ===
Hardgrave returned to New Zealand at the end of the season, arriving in Auckland on board the Niagara via Sydney on 8 August. On 9 August he attended a welcome home dance for the returning New Zealand side who had recently toured Australia. Then on 10 August he was a guest at the weekly Auckland Rugby League control board meeting and "gave an interesting talk on football in [England and France]". He began work as an engineer and was living at 28 Marlborough Street, in Eden.

Hardgrave was quick to rejoin his Mount Albert side, playing for them in their round 18 match against Papakura on 20 August. Now aged 32 he scored a try in a 44–12 win. The Herald reported that he "made the most of few opportunities, but showed his ability to make an opening, and he still has a lot of pace". The Auckland Star said "there was much interest in the reappearance in Auckland football of R. Hardgrave. Most of his play has been in England and France, but on previous appearances here he was rated as one of the best wing three-quarters that the game has produced. And Hardgrave is still holding his form in a remarkable way". His final game of the season came in their round 1 Roope Rooster loss to City.

The 1939 season was to be Hardgrave's final one playing. It was however a very busy one by New Zealand standards with him playing in 24 games in total. For Mount Albert he played in 20 matches and scored 18 tries. After scoring in a round 1 win over Papakura his next match was against a touring side from Sydney which was largely made up of Eastern Suburbs players. Mount Albert had been joined by Australian Bob Banham as full time player coach after he had spent the 1938 season assisting various Auckland clubs. Mount Albert had built a strong side in their first few seasons in the Fox Memorial shield competition and went on to win it with a 13 win, 1 draw, 3 loss record. Mount Albert beat the Sydney XIII by 16 points to 11 with Hardgrave scoring a try despite seeing little of the ball. He scored again in matches with Newton on 15 April, and a round 7 loss against North Shore Albions on 20 May which was their first loss of the season. He suffered a leg injury "in the second spell which hampered his speed". Hardgrave once again scored a solitary try in an 18–7 win over City a week later, before scoring twice in their 42–13 thrashing of Ponsonby United. The Herald said that "the wings Hardgrave and McInnarney played brilliantly, especially the former whose clever running and quick side-step resulted in two tries".

In early July he was selected in a New Zealand trial match as part of the process to select the side to tour England. He played in the Probables side which won 31 to 17 at Carlaw Park on 8 July. A final trial match was played days later but Hardgrave failed to make selection. The following weekend he scored 2 tries for Mount Albert in a 21–19 win over Manukau with it reported that he "was the best three quarters on the ground". He again scored a pair of tries in a 24–15 win over Marist Old Boys a week later. The Herald reported that the now 33 year old "Hardgrave on the wing … gave one of the best displays seen this season and must be considered unlucky to have missed a place in the New Zealand team. He used judgment in beating the opposition, and revealed more speed than most of the wing-three quarters in Auckland".

Hardgrave was then selected for the Auckland to play South Auckland (northern Waikato) on 5 August. He made a triumphant return to the representative scene with a three try performance in a 26–17 victory. It was said that "Hardgrave, on the wing, again showed himself to be the best back in Auckland in this position. He beat the defence with clever swerves and used judgment in passing to supporting forwards".

Hardgrave then returned to his Mount Albert side which secured the Fox Memorial championship with an 8–0 win over Ponsonby which saw Hardgrave score a 50-yard intercept try. Again he was described as the "outstanding wing-three-quarter in Auckland, and he was mainly responsible for Mount Albert’s success. His try came as a result of a brilliant individual effort". Mount Albert's final championship match came against City which they won 18–9. Hardgrave made several brilliant runs including one where he beat 4 men. He was again outstanding in a round 1 Roope Rooster win over Newton where he "made many fine runs, and several times went close to scoring solo tries". He did indeed score once in their 8–0 victory.

Hardgrave was then selected for the Auckland side to play Wellington on 2 September. Auckland won 23–9 at Carlaw Park in the match played on 2 September. It was said that "Hardgrave, with speed and elusiveness gave a brilliant exhibition of attacking play, and is certainly the outstanding win in New Zealand".

Hardgrave then played in Mount Albert's 22–21 Roope Roster semi final win over Richmond Rovers and their 13–11 loss in the final against Marist. Then on 23 September he scored 3 tries in Mount Albert's Stormont Shield final victory over Marist. Mount Albert qualified for the match by winning the championship. After the match the Auckland Star wrote "Hardgrave with speed and ability to penetrate played a spectacular wing game". his final match of the season was for the Auckland Pākehā side in a match against Tāmaki (Auckland Māori) on 30 September. The Pākehā side won 15–12 at Carlaw Park. This was to be his last ever match as he retired from playing at the end of the season. It was said that "Hardgrave on the wind, disclosed speed and cleverness when the ball occasionally came his way".

=== Retirement, transfer to Newton, and coaching ===
Hardgrave had played his final game of senior football though it is possible that he intended to play again at some point as in April 1941 it was reported that he had transferred to his old Newton Rangers club. It was also mentioned at an Auckland Rugby League meeting that Hardgrave "was going to coach Newton and also play this season". Newton had finished 7th out of 9 sides in the 1940 season and had a 6 win 14 loss for the entire season in all matches. Newton finished the 1941 season with a 7 win, 1 draw, 8 loss record in the Fox Memorial Shield championship, finishing 5th of 9 sides though Hardgrave did not take the field. They also lost 2 pre-season matches, their first round Roope Rooster match, along with their only game in the Phelan Shield competition, and also went down 32–19 on a tour match against Stratford in Taranaki for an overall record of 7–1–13 in his first season in charge. In 1942 he was listed in a squad of players prior to their preliminary match in April but it is unlikely he played during the year, instead coaching the side in the 1942 and 1943 seasons.

== Personal life and death ==
Roy Hardgrave married Ethel Beatrice Taylor Sherry on 21 December 1927 at the Pitt Street Methodist Church. At the time his family was living on Church Street in Onehunga. They had a daughter in February 1930 while residing in England when Hardgrave was playing for St Helens.

In October 1934 Hardgrave published a notice that he was seeking to transfer his publicans licence that he held for the Market Hotel to Ernest George Hallett. His transfer request was granted on 5 December.

In 1940 it was reported that he had been charged with obtaining two licenses for petrol. Petrol was rationed at the time and members of the public had to acquire a license giving them permission to buy a certain amount of petrol. Hardgrave had been granted a license from the Auckland office for 12 gallons but was living in Balmoral at the time and the amount was insufficient to get to his work at Westfield where he was an engineer. So he acquired a second license from the Onehunga office to get 24 gallons. He then cancelled his first license and posted it to the authorities. The magistrate found the matter to be a technical one and only fined Hardgrave £1. At the time according to census records he was living with his family at 28 Marlborough Street in Mount Eden. Though on the 1942 Ballot Lists his occupation was listed as "chamber hand". He remained living in Mt Eden throughout the mid-1940s and working as an engineer until moving to 281 New North Road by 1949 when his occupation was listed as being a meter reader.

His father Arthur Hardgrave died in January 1954 in Onehunga.

By 1957 they had moved to Mount Roskill and he was working as a driver. They moved to Glen Eden in 1960 where he continued to work as a driver for a time before being employed as a packer whilst living on Walker Road (now named Routley Drive) in Glen Eden through the mid-1960s. His mother, Una, died in 1964. They were living on Woodglen Road in Glen Eden in 1969 with Hardgrave working as a cleaner before they moved to the Hibiscus Coast in the 1970s. His brother Edgar died on 11 May 1971. They lived at 87 Stanmore Bay road on the Whangaparaoa Peninsula for the next decade with Hardgrave returning to work as a driver.

Roy Arthur Hardgrave died in February 1982 aged 76. Ethel died on 16 September 1986.
