= Lou Hutt =

New Zealand rugby league player (1904-1969)

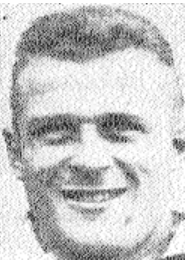

Personal information
- Full name: Louis Stanley George Hutt
- Born: 8 July 1904 Auckland, New Zealand
- Died: 24 May 1969 (aged 64) Auckland, New Zealand

Playing information
- Weight: 14 st 2 lb (198 lb; 90 kg)
- Position: Second-row, Prop, Lock, Hooker
Club
Years	Team	Pld	T	G	FG	P
1921–24	Ngaruawahia	16	0	0	0	0
1925–29	Ponsonby United	49	15	1	0	47
1929–31	St Helens	82	6	0	0	18
1931–35	Ponsonby United	51	18	0	0	54
1936	Newton Rangers	15	6	0	0	18
	Total	213	45	1	0	137
Representative
Years	Team	Pld	T	G	FG	P
1921–24	Lower Waikato	10	2	1	1	10
1922–25	South Auckland	4	0	0	0	0
1924	Waikato	1	0	0	0	0
1926–36	Auckland	28	7	0	0	21
1926–35	North Island	6	3	0	0	9
1928–35	New Zealand	8	1	0	0	3
1930	Other Nationalities	2	1	0	0	3
1932	New Zealand Presidents XIII	2	0	0	0	0

Coaching information
Representative
Years	Team	Gms	W	D	L	W%
1935	Ponsonby United	17	7	1	9	41
1936	Newton	16	2	0	14	13

Lou Hutt was a representative rugby league player who played in the Waikato, Auckland, and in England. He played for New Zealand in 8 tests from 1928 to 1935 and was Kiwi #193.

== Early life ==
Louis Stanley George Hutt was born in Auckland on July 8, 1904. He was the son of Clara Hannah Hutt and Frederick Stanley John Hutt, while he had a brother named Victor Walter Carder Hutt who was born in 1898.

== Playing career ==
=== Waikato ===
Hutt began playing senior rugby league in 1921 at the extremely young age of 16. He was playing for the Ngaruawahia club side in the Lower Waikato competition. On June 12 he played for the Lower Waikato representative team in a match against Hamilton-Cambridge. His side won 27 to 10 at Victoria Square in Cambridge with Hutt playing in the second row. On July 17 he played for the same side against the same opponent with Hamilton-Cambridge winning 8-6 though Hutt did cross for Lower Waikato's first try. He was named as an emergency player in Lower Waikato's Endean Shield match with King Country on August 7 but did not take the field.

In 1922 he was again playing for Ngaruawahia and scored a try and kicked a conversion in a B team match for them against Hamilton B on July 15. His try came after receiving a pass from Wilson Hall and “beat practically the Hamilton team, [and] scored beneath the posts” before also converting the try. The newspapers reported that he was the “outstanding player” in the Ngaruawahia forward pack. His form was good enough to gain selection for the South Auckland (Waikato) representative side later in the season. He played for them against Wellington on September 5 in the front row. The match was played at Palmerston North and saw South Auckland win easily 32–6 in front of 500 spectators. Hutt then played for South Auckland against Hawkes Bay in a match at Napier on September 9 which they lost 15–13. Then on September 27 Hutt played for South Auckland against the touring New South Wales. They performed well against a strong side only losing 17–12 with Hutt in the second row. The match was played at Steele Park in Hamilton before a crowd of 1,500. Just 3 days later South Auckland played Auckland on Steele Park with Hutt's side winning 28–16 in front of 2,500 spectators.

1923 saw Hutt once again playing for Ngaruawahia and he made 2 appearances for the Lower Waikato side in matches against Hamilton on July 7 and August 4 with Lower Waikato winning the match 11–0. On October 8 he played in a South Auckland trial match to try to make the South Auckland team to play Auckland but he was not ultimately picked in that side.

1924 was a far busier representative season for Hutt. He was aged 20 by this point and his father was the president of the Ngaruawahia rugby league club. On June 3 he played for Lower Waikato against Hamilton. Hamilton won the match 16–13 at Hinemoa park. Hutt played at hooker and was said to have not had a good match in that position “but in the loose work is as good as any other forward in the district”. On July 19 he played for Lower Waikato again against Hamilton and scored a try in a 19–13 win. The try came after there forwards had Hamilton “hemmed” on their line with “Hutt forcing his way through to score between the posts”. After the match was completed the selectors chose him to play in the front row for South Auckland against the touring England. The match was played in Hamilton on July 23 before a crowd of 3,000. England were too strong winning 28–16. He kicked a penalty for Lower Waikato in their 26–5 win over Hamilton on July 26 in a match which was for the Endean Shield. On July 26 he played for Waikato against the England side once more. This time he was playing lock in a 30–12 loss. The match was played in Ngaruawahia in front of a large crowd. On August 20 Hutt played for Lower Waikato against Auckland B at Carlaw Park in Auckland with the visiting side going down 15–14. And then 3 days later on August 23 he kicked a conversion for Lower Waikato against Hamilton in an Endean Shield match which they won 20–2 at Huntly. Hutt's final representative match of the season was for South Auckland against Auckland at Steele Park in Hamilton. South Auckland won 21–5 against an under strength visiting side though Hutt played a prominent part for South Auckland in the match and they held on to the Northern Union Cup.

In 1925 was to be Hutt's final season playing in the Waikato. He played for South Auckland against Auckland C on June 27 as part of a series of trial matches on that day to help the selectors choose the New Zealand team to tour England and Wales. South Auckland lost 13–11 with Hutt playing in the second row. On August 19 he played for South Auckland again in a 24–16 loss to the full Auckland side at Carlaw Park. The following month Hutt applied to join the Ponsonby side in the Auckland competition. It is unclear if he was moving to Auckland for work reasons or to advance his rugby league career.

=== Move to Auckland and Ponsonby club ===
In September Hutt applied to join the Ponsonby United rugby league club and this was approved. Just days later he debuted for them in the Stormont Shield semi final where they beat Marist Old Boys 23–22. It was said that he was one of their best forwards and “justified his inclusion in the team”. He played again the following week in the side which won the Stormont Shield final in its inaugural season with a 35–3 win over City Rovers with Hutt said to have played well.

=== Auckland and North Island selection and New Zealand trialist ===
In 1926 Hutt played 14 matches for Ponsonby and scored 3 tries. Ponsonby won the championship when they defeated City Rovers in the final 13–8. After two rounds of club games the newspaper reported that he gave “one of the best exhibitions of forward play given at Carlaw Park this season…from start to finish he was dashing, and few better displays have been seen in Auckland. On that showing he would at least be entitled to consideration as a possibility for the New Zealand team, and it will be interesting to note his form in matches to come”. Then after their round 6 match with Marist Old Boys it was said he played with “great elan and dash and when occasion offered worked with his backs in the manner that is expected of a versatile forward”.

On June 26 Hutt made his Auckland debut against his former South Auckland team. Auckland won easily by 49 points to 15 before a crowd of 8,000 at Carlaw Park with Hutt playing in the second row. He was then selected to play in the second row for the North Island in their inter-island match with the South Island a week later. The North Island won 31-22 before a large crowd of 18,000 again at Carlaw Park. It was said in the newspaper that Hutt had “now been given two trials but so far has failed to produce the promise expected of him”. Then on July 7 he played for Auckland against the “Rest of New Zealand”. Auckland went down 28–21 with Hutt once again playing in the second row. He played in another trial match on July 10 for an A team against a B Team which was a curtain-raiser to the NZ Probables v Possibles match. Following this match the New Zealand team to tour England and Wales was announced and Hutt missed selection. He was named in an extended squad in case any players named were unable to tour but ultimately was not required. He played one further representative match for Auckland against South Auckland on October 9. The match was for the Northern Union Challenge Cup and Auckland held on to it with a 25–8 win. Hutt then rounded off the season playing in the Stormont Shield win over Richmond Rovers 15–5.

The 1927 season saw Hutt play 14 matches for Ponsonby, scoring 2 tries and kicking 1 conversion. Ponsonby could only manage second place in the championship. Hutt's first game of the season was for Auckland against the returning Auckland members of the New Zealand team that had toured England and Wales. The Auckland side won 24-21 before 14,000 spectators with Hutt playing in the lock position. At the conclusion of the club season Hutt played 4 matches for Auckland. Auckland had gone on a Southern Tour and he played in their match against Canterbury at Monica Park, Christchurch on September 10. Auckland won 24–13 with Hutt scoring a try in the corner in the second half. He then played against a combined West Coast/Buller side at Victoria Park in Greymouth with Auckland winning 42-15. Hutt played in his third consecutive match of the tour against Otago on September 17 with Auckland winning 20–13. And he was again selected for the final tour match against Wellington on September 21. The match was played at Newtown Park in Wellington and saw Auckland win easily by 41 points to 23 with Hutt said to be one of the more conspicuous forwards in the Auckland side. On October 8 Buller visited Auckland and Hutt was part of the local side which won 60 to 33 with Hutt scoring a try. Then a week later he played in the final representative match of the season which saw Auckland lose control of the Northern Union Challenge Cup in a 29–12 loss to South Auckland.

=== New Zealand selection ===
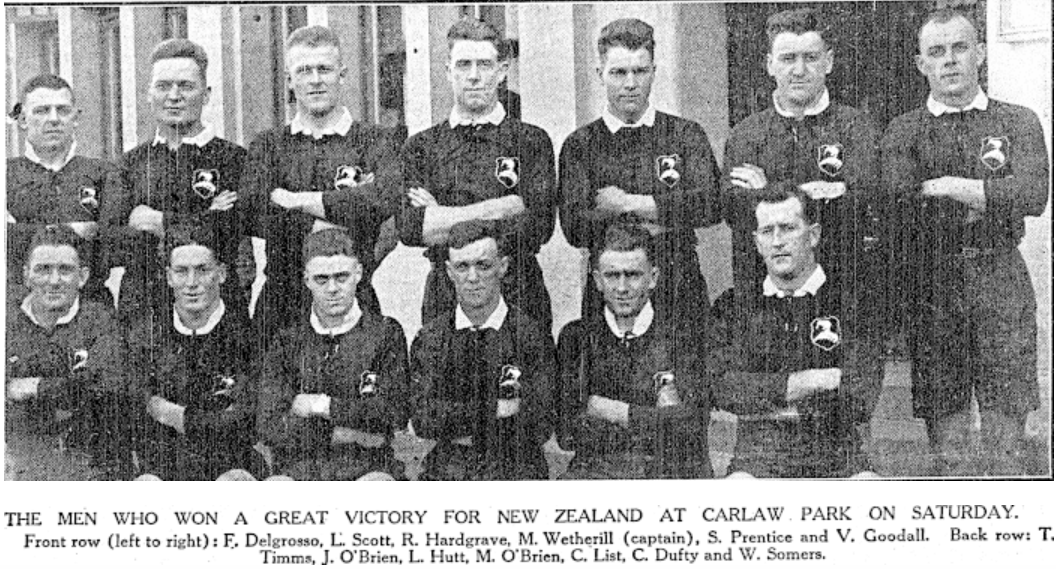

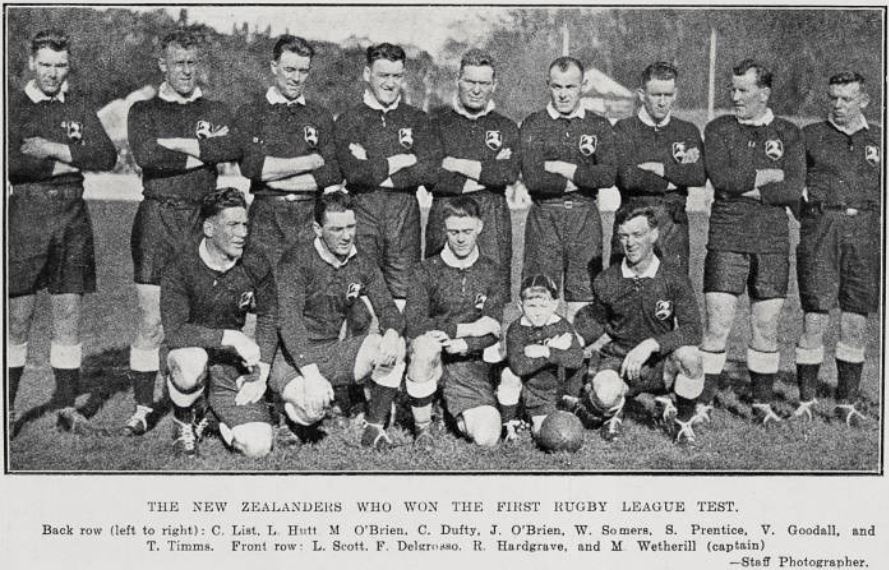
The NZ team to play the first test on August 4 at Carlaw Park.

The 1928 season was an extremely busy one for Hutt. He played in 28 matches in total. He made 17 appearances for Ponsonby and scored 5 tries. His first representative match of the season was for Auckland against South Auckland. Auckland won back the Northern Union Challenge Cup in a 22–3 with Hutt scoring a try wide out after receiving a pass from Allan Seagar who had intercepted. Hutt was playing in the front row. On July 11 he played in an Auckland trial match as they were beginning preparations for the England tour the following month. His Possibles side won 24–14. Then on July 21 he was in the second row for the Auckland team which thrashed Canterbury 66 to 26 at Carlaw park before an enormous crowd of 15,000. Four days later on July 25 the Auckland team was upset by the visiting team from South Auckland by 19 points to 17. The score was said to have flattered Auckland with the forwards being outclassed with the exception of “Hutt and Hall”. Following this performance Hutt was selected in the second row for the North Island team to play the South Island in their annual fixture. The North Island side ran out easy winners by 44 to 8 before a crowd of 10,000 at Carlaw Park. Hutt's try was the first of the match after Maurice Wetherill combined with Raynor, and Hec Brisbane before Hutt crossed.

England had arrived in New Zealand by this point after leaving the Australian leg of their tour. Hutt was selected to play in the first test against them in the position of prop. New Zealand upset England by 17 points to 13 at Carlaw Park before a record crowd of 28,000 on August 4. The match was described as a “desperately hard game”. A week later he was again in the front row for the match between Auckland and England on August 11. Auckland went down 26–15. Hutt then headed south to play in the second test at the Caledonian Ground in Dunedin on August 18. Before a crowd of 12,000 New Zealand went down 13–5. The match was described as being very dirty with players from both teams playing the man rather than the ball throughout the match. It was reported that Goodall, Hutt, and both O’Brien's “kept the Englishmen busy” with the ball. During the second half Hutt was hurt but was able to continue after receiving medical attention. A week later on August 25 the third and deciding test was played at English Park in Christchurch and in a far tamer affair England won the test and the series with a 6–5 victory before a crowd of 21,000. So many had gathered to watch the game that the gates had to be closed a short time before kick off as the ground reached capacity and 3,000 were left outside. Hutt and O’Brien were said to have played well in the forwards and Hutt was also involved in some “robust spoiling work” along with Hall. He helped save a try when he tackled Sullivan near the line and Tim Peckham kicked the resulting loose ball out over the side line before Bowman cold dive on it.

After watching Hutt's matches in Auckland against the English side the New Zealand Herald reported that he “is one of the most improved players of the code in New Zealand. From a loose forward he has developed into a great worker in the scrum. Hutt stood up to his work in great style, and in each match was going strongly at the finish”. It was also reported in the Manawatu Times that with the exception of Hutt and Goodall, we have no league forwards in New Zealand to-day equal to these [English] men, and very few in Union Rugby either”. One of the English managers, Mr. F.C. Hutchins said following the third test that “Hutt [was] fit for any league team in the world”.

Just a week later Hutt found himself in far different playing circumstances as he was wearing the Ponsonby jersey in Hikurangi with his side playing an exhibition match there. He scored a try in a 22–10 win. On September 15 he played for Auckland against Otago with Auckland winning easily by 42 to 22. Hutt played 5 further matches for Ponsonby but their season ended when they were knocked out of the Roope Rooster competition with a loss to Richmond Rovers in the semi-finals. He made one more appearance for Auckland in a match with South Auckland on October 13 at Davies Park in Huntly. South Auckland won by 21 points to 7.

=== Signing for St Helens ===
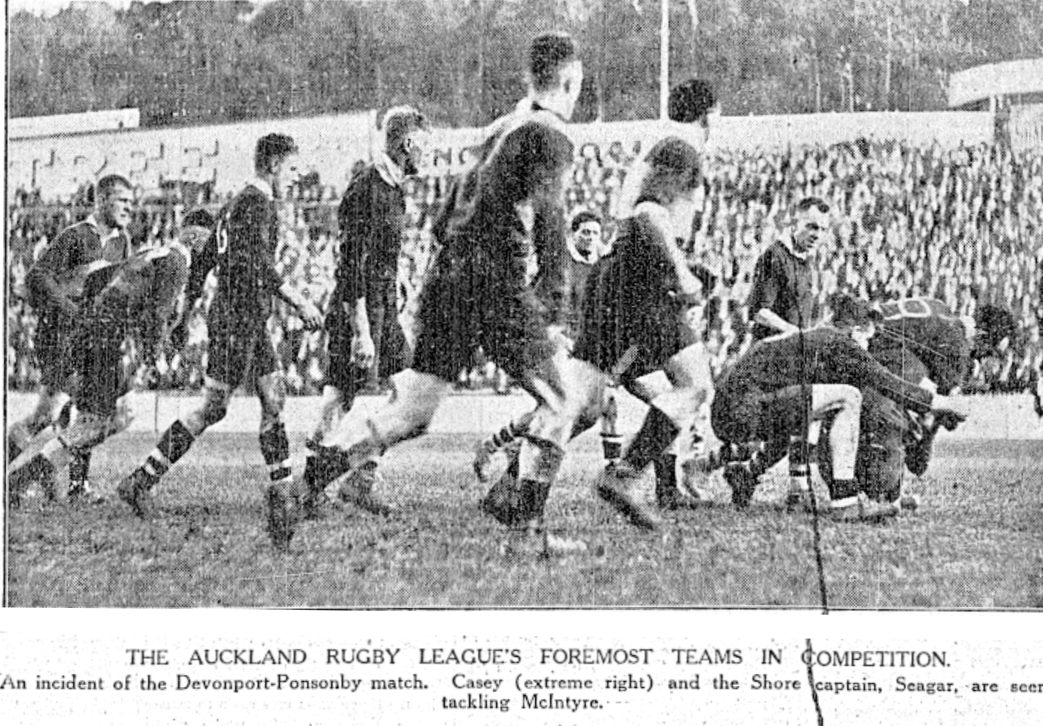

(Pictured: Lou Hutt pictured on the extreme left playing for Ponsonby v Devonport at Carlaw Park on June 15, 1929) Hutt began the 1929 season playing once more for Ponsonby. He played 8 games for them scoring 4 tries before it was reported that he had signed a contract to play for St Helens in the English competition. Hutt had signed along with fellow Auckland and New Zealand players Trevor Hall and Roy Hardgrave. He played 2 further matches for Ponsonby before departing for England in early July.

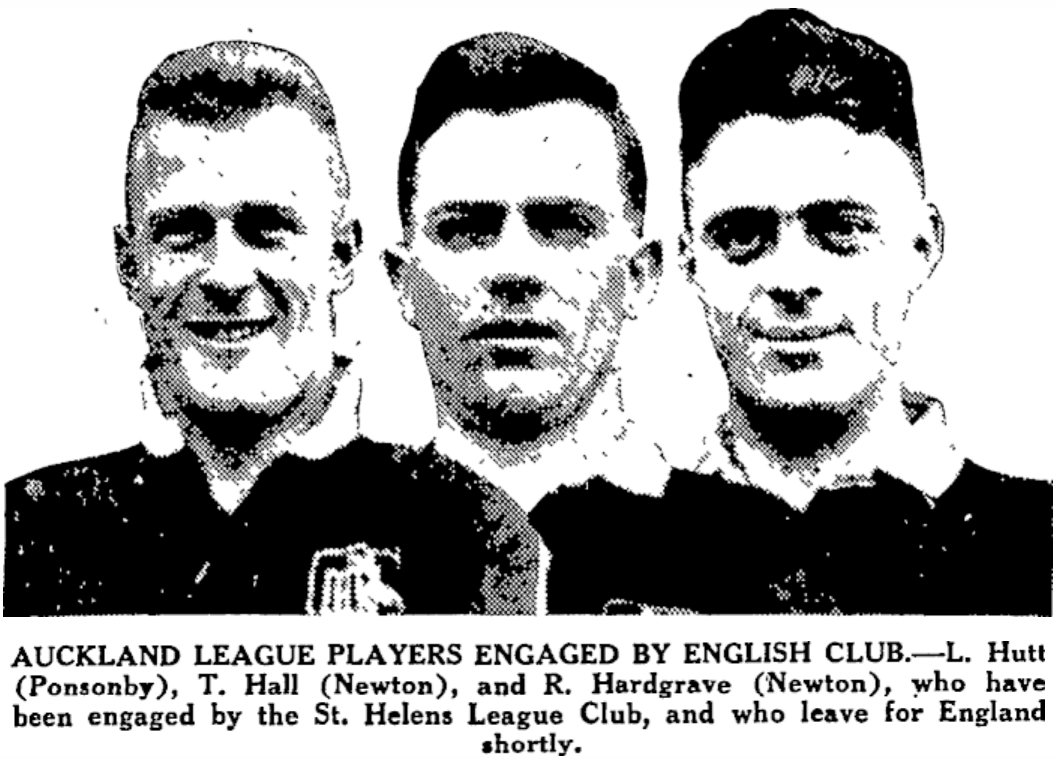

Hutt officially signed for St Helens on August 15 after arriving in England. He made his debut 2 weeks later on August 31 in a match against Widnes. In his first season he played 42 games and scored 3 tries. He played mainly as a blind-side prop and occasionally as a loose forward and hooker in this first season. The St Helens team was strong though they did not win any titles after suffering a controversial loss in the Challenge Cup semi-final at their home ground of Knowsley Road. The St Helens Heritage society stated on their webpage that Hutt “had expressed a desire to play in England” and that he along with Hall had signed for 50 pounds (with Roy Hardgrave signing for 100 pounds). It was said that he was known as “the daddy of them all” as he was a “strongly built man who was extremely difficult to tackle and despite his status as a forward had the pace to play in the threequarters if required”. There was controversy during the season when he and the other two Kiwi's in the side over the failure of the club to provide suitable employment for them. They were going to refuse to play in the Challenge Cup semi-final against Wigan but a ‘deal’ was brokered by the mayor Alderman Tom Boscow. The three of them then went on to play fine games in a replay win 22–10.

While in his second season Hutt played a further 40 games scoring 3 more tries. He spent the majority of the season playing in the loose forward position. His final ever match for St Helens came on April 25 and was against Hull Kingston Rovers in a 25–5 loss though he did cross for a try. In total he played 82 matches, 52 were won, 25 lost and 5 were drawn including a match against the touring Australian side on November 16, 1929, where the score was 18-18.

He played in the front row for an International side (Other Nationalities) against England on April 7, 1930. His side won 35–19 at Thrum Hall, Halifax. New Zealand teammates who were also playing in England at the time Lou Brown and Len Mason also played and scored 4 tries between them. And on October 1 later that year he played for a similar international side against England and scored a try in a 31–18 loss at Knowsley Road, St Helens.

It was reported in the Auckland Star on June 5 that Hutt was returning to Auckland within a fortnight. It was said that he “went Home to play as a front row forward, but has proved himself a great breakaway also”. It was stated “that Hutt is returning for family reasons, and that he does not intend to play again”. Then on June 17 the New Zealand Herald reported that he had completed his contract and “is likely to play for his old [Ponsonby] club during the present season” which had been underway for 2 months. After arriving back in New Zealand Hutt had a lengthy “chat” with an Auckland Star representative. The reporter stated that he was “classed the best breakaway forward in England”. Hutt said that “they take their football in the North of England with profound seriousness, and on his arrival two years ago he soon realised that conditions and play were vastly different from what he had been accustomed to…in the first four matches I had to stand up to the greatest hammering I have ever had in my life. To deal with this attention I had to adopt their methods, and I had to get fitter. Unfortunately, I did not strike form as quickly as Hall, who, in the first season made a great name for himself, while I ended in hospital with appendicitis. However, the team performed brilliantly, winning the Lancashire League but being beaten by Widnes in the Cup at Wembley by 10-3. There is a thing I have noticed in England. Once a team has started with a goal or try, the crowd thinks that is the finish. They cannot get over that undaunted spirits of colonials, who never give up, no matter what the odds are, until the end of the game. When the spectators see a couple of goals or tries on in the Homeland they think that all is over. The natural tenacity is a spirit which helps colonial players of there. They don’t cave in. I may mention that different clubs in the Homeland play different styles. Some have great forward teams and some great backs. The past season was somewhat against St Helens because the club plays the fast and open method. They have the two best wingers in the world – Alf Ellaby first and Hardgrave second…We played ankle deep or more in mud practically the whole of this last year, during which I had determined to make a thorough success of myself or give up the game. I am thankful to think that I was able to succeed. All the clubs have been feeling the effects of the general depression, and their financial position has been rendered worse by an unusually wet season”. After speaking about several New Zealanders who were also playing in England Hutt went on “all I have to say as the result of playing abroad is that in New Zealand we have the goods to convince the public with the best of rugby league. It needs dressing up a bit, and by that I mean that our clubs must concentrate on training and the science of the game. When a man can run 130 yards at full pace ten times in an evening, and do it with ease, he may be said to be ready to see out a fast match. There are, of course, the finer points or technique to be acquired, but these come with coaching”. Hutt said that he had not decided to play for any club in particular but hoped that he would be able to share the benefits of his knowledge to any team he became associated with and that he had “been playing senior since I was sixteen, and that’s eleven years ago…so I think I have done my part”.

=== Return to Auckland and Ponsonby ===
A week after Hutt's newspaper interview it was reported that he was to return to the Ponsonby club and he trained with them during the week. His first match was on July 4 against Marist Old Boys. He played 6 matches for them over the remainder of the season scoring 4 tries. In the August 1 match against Devonport United he was sent off five minutes from the end of the match with his side trailing 13–0. The judiciary decided that the ordering off was a sufficient punishment and he was allowed to play the following week against Richmond. Following this match he was selected to play for the North Island against the South Island on August 15. The North Island won easily by 52 to 23 at Carlaw Park.

=== New Zealand series v England ===
Hutt again turned out for Ponsonby in the 1932 season however there was a report prior to the season beginning that he intended to play for Marist. An “application for a transfer [was] under consideration” in late April though it was not reported what happened and then on May 14 in round 2 he appeared for Ponsonby. He played 8 matches for them scoring 3 tries. On July 16 he played for an Auckland XIII against South Auckland at Carlaw Park with the home side winning 29–13. Then a week later Hutt ran out for the North Island side once again. They defeated the South Island by 27 points to 18 before a large crowd of 15,000. The match carried added weight as the selectors were looking to choose the New Zealand side for the test series against England. Hutt was given some time during the first half in the hooker position and “did very well”.

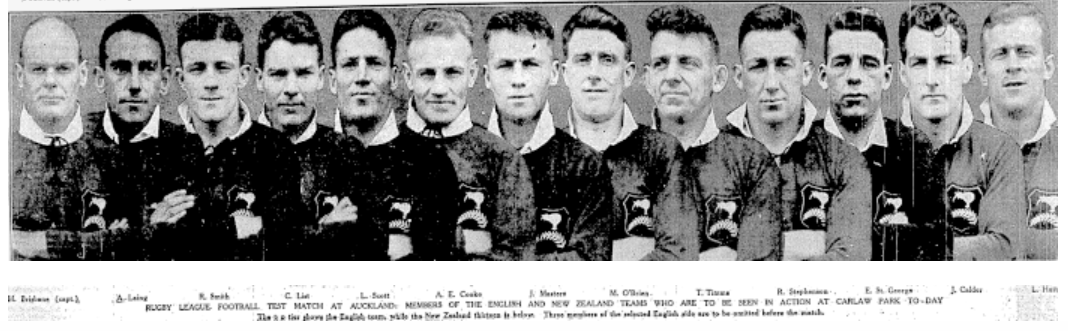

Hutt was selected for the first test in the lock position. New Zealand lost 24-9 before 25,000 spectators at Carlaw Park on July 30. He was heavily involved throughout the match and early on made a break before passing to Jim Calder who was tackled by Jim Sullivan. Later he and Dick Smith “had the defence beaten, but the ball rolled into touch, a foot from England’s line”.

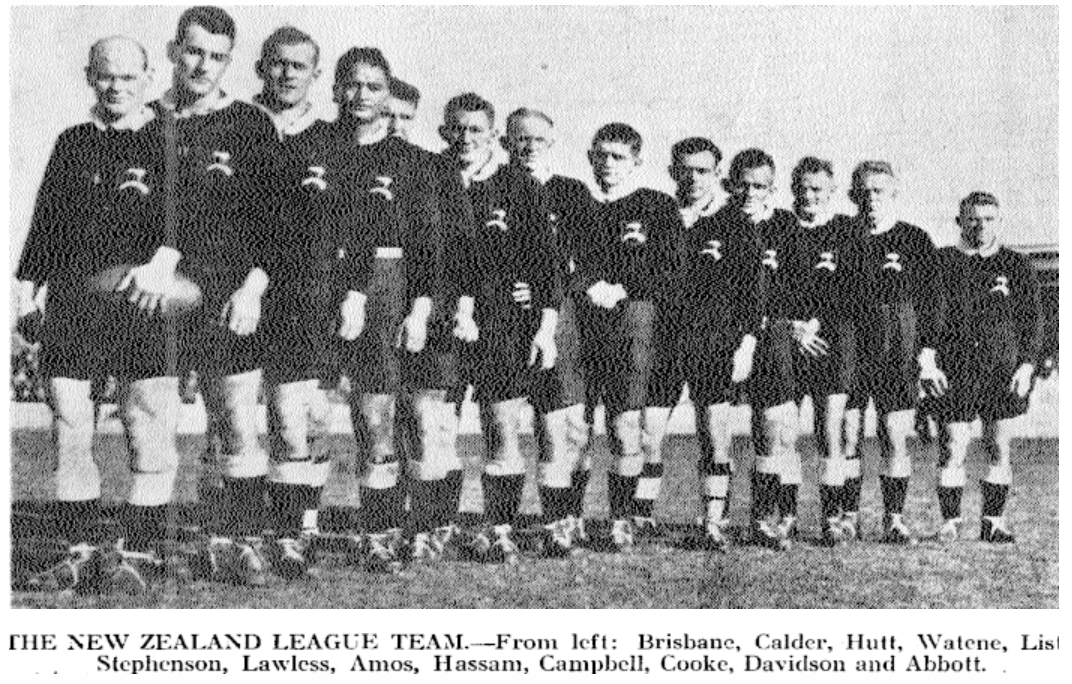

However early in the second half Hutt “foolishly sent a long pass infield [which] in a flash [Gus] Risman snapped it up and passed to [Alf] Ellaby” and then on to Arthur Atkinson who scored. He was later involved in an attack with O’Brien and Calder with Hutt taking the play to the English fullback but play was cleared. He was then involved in play with Jonas Masters and Bert Cooke with Cooke held up on the try line. It was later reported that “Hutt was overshadowed by the resourceful Feetham … and two of his passes were costly. Still, the whole blame cannot be placed on Hutt”.

A week later Hutt played for Auckland against England and his side was defeated 19 to 14. Hutt played in the front row. He was then picked to play for New Zealand in the second test at Monica Park in Christchurch. England won 25 to 14. Following the second test Hutt was chosen for a New Zealand Presidents XIII side to play England in Wellington and were thrashed 59 to 8. Hutt was playing lock and captained the side. Unfortunately he suffered a compound fracture of his thumb early in the match and was unable to continue leaving his side with just 12 for the remainder of the match. The injury ruled him out of the third test and he played no further football in the season.

It was then reported in mid October that St Helens wanted to resign him for their upcoming season. He was however reluctant to go at such short notice and would not leave if he could gain a suitable permanent job in New Zealand. On October 22 it was reported that he had accepted the offer. On October 27 it was reported that he had been held up as his wife and child were unable to travel at that time and their departure would be delayed. Ultimately they did not make the move and Hutt remained in Auckland. He had intended to retire from the game and did not begin the season for Ponsonby.

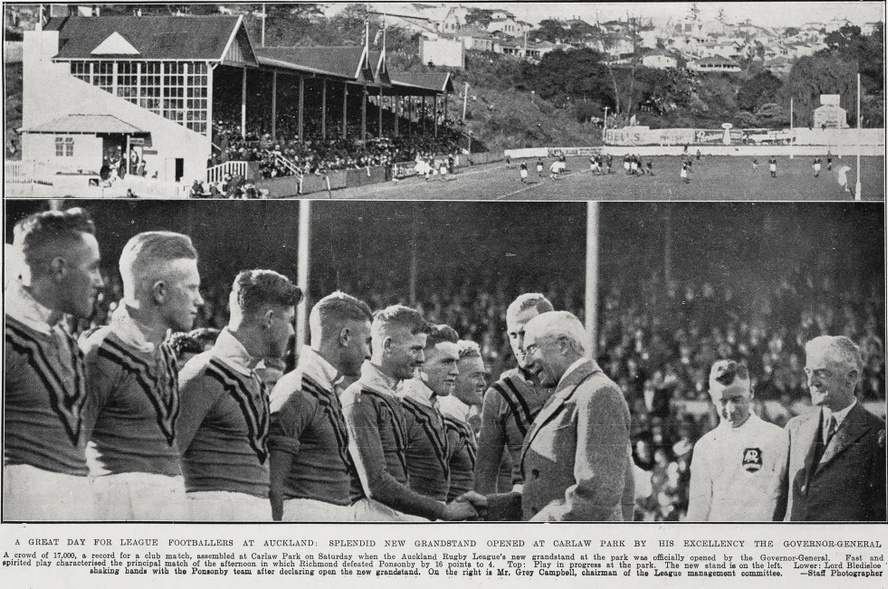
Hutt introducing Lord Bledisloe to his team mates at the opening of the new grandstand at Carlaw Park on May 12, 1934.

However he returned to the field in round 9 on July 8 for their clash with Richmond and captained the team thereafter. He played 7 matches scoring 2 tries. On July 15 he played in an Auckland B team against an A team but this was the nearest he came to representative football in the season. At the annual meeting of Ponsonby at the start of the 1934 season Hutt was awarded a medal as the clubs best forward. He was also appointed captain for the 1934 campaign.

He went on to play 17 matches for Ponsonby in 1934, scoring 4 tries. The team finished 3rd in the Fox Memorial championship under his leadership and were knocked out of the Roope Rooster competition in the semi-final and then lost the Phelan Shield final against Newton Rangers. On June 30 he played for Auckland against Taranaki and scored a try in a 35 to 8 win. He captained the Auckland side in their August 11 match with Northland which they won 19 to 12. Then on September 1 he played in the front row for the North Island in their 36 to 18 win over the South Island. He scored a try in the second half after crossing in the tackle of Jim Amos. A week later on September 15 he played for Auckland once more, this time against South Auckland and was part of a convincing 35 to 16 win. Hutt's last match of the season was for a Ponsonby XIII against the touring Australian side Western Suburbs. The side was primarily made up of Ponsonby players but had Roy Hardgrave, Bert Laing, Des Herring, and Donald added to the side however they were not good enough on the day and lost 26 to 13 with Hutt playing lock and captaining the side.

In the 1935 season he was the coach of Ponsonby with B. Longbottom selector. They had a disappointing first grade competition with a 3 win, 1 draw, 8 loss record and were knocked out of the Roope Rooster in the first round, however they did win the Phelan Shield. They finished with an overall record of 7 wins, 1 draw, and 9 losses.

=== Test series v Australia ===
(Pictured, Lou Hutt in the back ground on the left in support of Ted Mincham in the 2nd test v Australia at Carlaw Park)

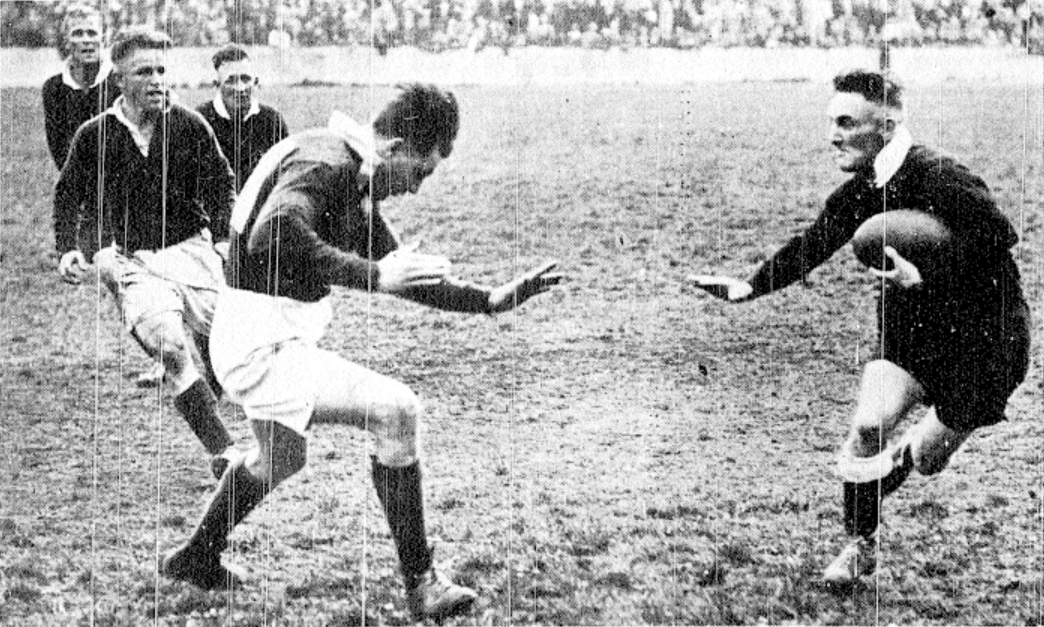

Hutt again was appointed player coach for Ponsonby for the 1935 season. He played 15 matches for them scoring 4 tries. They had a disappointing time in the Fox Memorial coming 2nd to last with a 3 win, 1 draw, 8 loss record. They were knocked out in the first round of the Roope Rooster but did go on to win the consolation Phelan Shield competition with an 11 to 8 win over Mount Albert United.

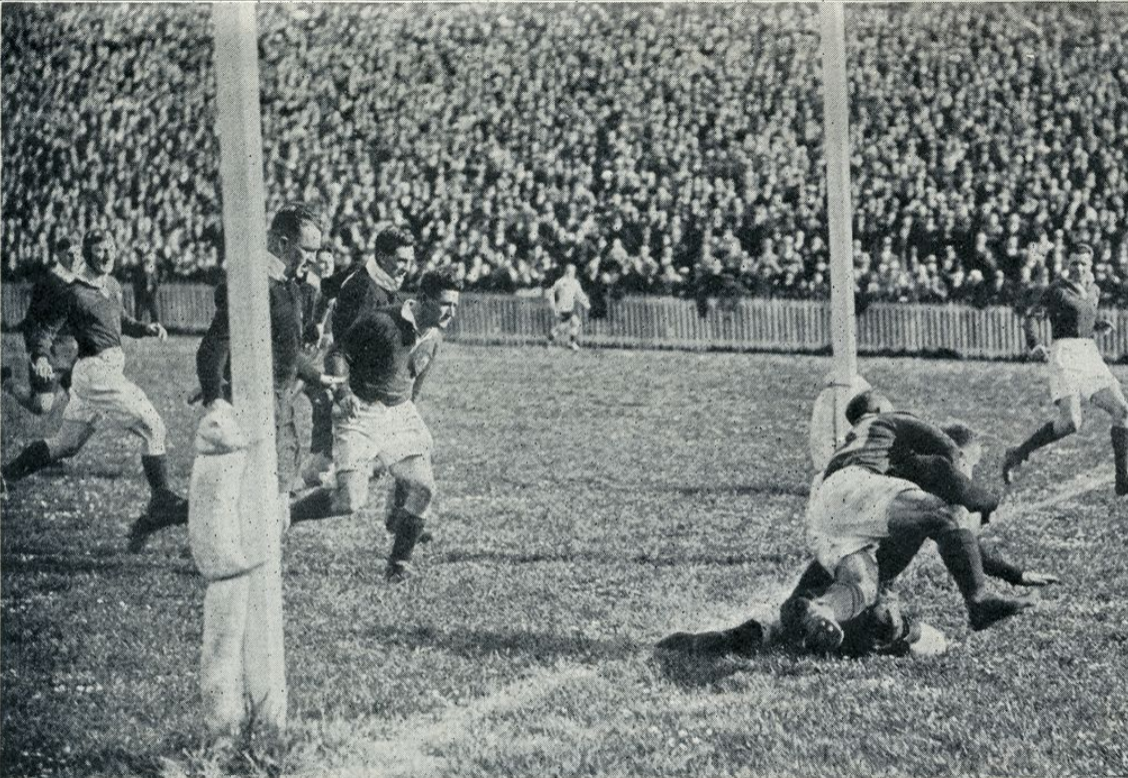
Hutt scoring his try in the tackle of Norman.

He made 5 appearances for Auckland. The first was in a 37 to 14 win over Taranaki where he scored a try. He then played in the North Island v South Island fixture for the 6th time. He scored another try in a tense 19 to 18 win. His next match for Auckland was against Wellington on September 7 where he scored a rare double in a 39 to 27 win in Wellington. A week later he played in the Auckland match against Canterbury in Christchurch with Auckland winning 26 to 13. Then the following weekend after returning to Auckland he played against the touring Australian side with Australia winning 16 to 8 before a crowd of 15,000 at Carlaw Park.

Hutt was then selected for the test series with Australia. He played in all 3 test matches which were all played at Carlaw Park. He played in the second row for the first test which saw New Zealand upset Australia 22 to 14 before a crowd of 20,000. He scored the only try of his test career after Lou Brown made a break and Hutt eventually received a pass from Cliff Satherley. In the second test he was moved into the front row. New Zealand was defeated heavily by 29 to 8. He was said to have worked "tirelessly" in the forward pack. The third test saw him move back to the second row but it made little difference to New Zealand's performance as they went down 31 to 8. Following the test matches he played for the Auckland Provincial team against Australia and they went down 36 to 18.

=== Move to Newton Rangers and retirement ===
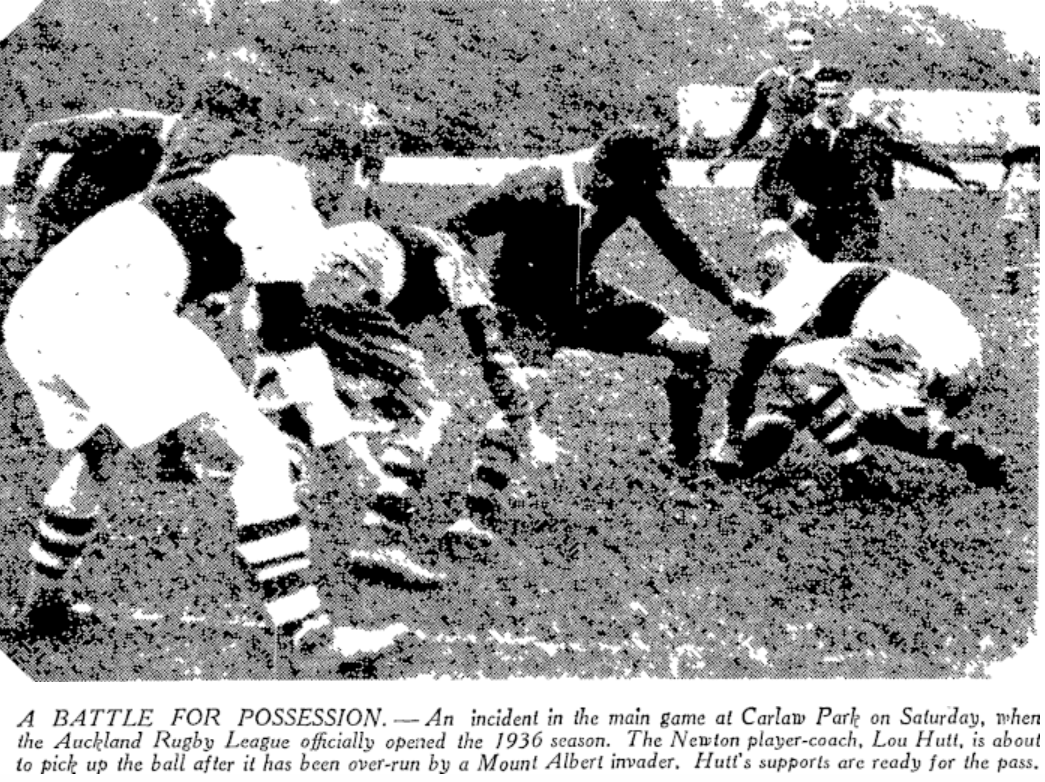
Hutt picking the ball up against Mount Albert on May 2.

The 1936 season saw Hutt join the Newton Rangers. He played 16 matches for them scoring 6 tries. The side struggled however and came last in the Fox Memorial competition and were knocked out in the first round of the Roope Rooster and suffered the same fate in the Phelan Shield. Hutt's career was winding down by this point as he was 32 years old and had been playing senior football for 16 seasons. He did however play in one final full representative match for Auckland against the relatively new Auckland Māori side. Auckland were defeated by 30 to 22. At the end of the season he retired. Though 4 years later in 1940 he did play in a match for the South Auckland veterans against the Auckland veterans having qualified due to his matches for them in the 1920s. In 1958 Hutt went on Auckland's Southern Tour as their manager.

== Personal life and death ==
Lou Hutt married Elizabeth May Holton on October 22, 1928. Lou Hutt worked as a traffic inspector and lived on Lincoln Rd in Henderson during the 1940s. He then moved to Grey Lynn and lived there for his final decades until his death. His father Frederick died in 1952 aged 80. Hutt's mother Clara died in 1956 aged 84. His wife Elizabeth died on January 4, 1969, aged 64 and Lou himself died 4 months later on May 24, 1969, also aged 64 and at the time was working as a bus driver. It is unknown how many children they had although when he was considering returning to play for St Helens a second time it was reported that they had one child. His brother Victor died on May 20, 1933, aged just 35, leaving behind a wife (Ivy Isabelle Hutt).
