= Ted Spillane =

New Zealand rugby league footballer and coach

Personal information
- Full name: Edmund Timothy Spillane
- Born: 5 January 1905 Dunedin, New Zealand
- Died: 2 December 1991 (aged 86) Leeds, West Yorkshire, England

Playing information
- Position: Wing, Centre, Stand-off, Scrum-half
Club
Years	Team	Pld	T	G	FG	P
	Marist (Christchurch)
1930–32	Wigan	67	11	1		35
	Keighley
	Bradford	101
	Total	168	11	1	0	35
Representative
Years	Team	Pld	T	G	FG	P
	Canterbury
1937	Dominion XIII

Coaching information
Club
Years	Team	Gms	W	D	L	W%
	Bramley

Edmund Timothy Spillane (5 January 1905 – 2 December 1991) was a New Zealand professional rugby league footballer who played in the 1920s and 1930s, and coached in the 1930s. He played at representative level for Dominion XIII and Canterbury, and at club level for Marist, and the English clubs Wigan, Keighley and Bradford Northern (captain), as a wing, centre, stand-off, or scrum-half, and coached at club level for Bradford Northern (assistant), and Bramley, he died in Leeds.

Spillane played in Canterbury's 26–66 defeat by Auckland in the 1928 New Zealand rugby league season Northern Union Cup in Auckland. Having become a well-known player and five-eighth for the Marist senior team, he signed on with English club Wigan in October 1929.

Spillane played scrum-half in Dominion XIII's 6–3 victory over France at Stadium Municipal, Toulouse on Sunday 21 March 1937.

He worked as an assistant coach at Bradford before being appointed Bramley's head coach.

== Personal life ==
Spillane married Edith Coyle in Bradford in April 1938. The marriage caused Spillane to be sued for breach of promise by Lily Prust to whom Spillane had previously been engaged. At trial, in July 1938 at Bradford County Court, Miss Prust claimed that she and Spillane had become engaged in 1937 and were at the time of Spillane's marriage still engaged. Spillane asserted that the engagement to Miss Prust had ended by mutual agreement. The jury found in Miss Prust's favour and awarded her £67 10s in damages.

The damages award forced Spillane to petition for his own bankruptcy in October 1938. The bankruptcy was not discharged until 1956 when a dividend of 4s 1 1/4d in the pound (21%) was paid.

Spillane died on 2 December 1991, and was buried at the Killingbeck Roman Catholic Cemetery.
