= Trevor Hall (rugby league) =

NZ international rugby league footballer and coach

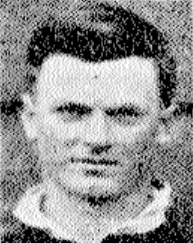

Personal information
- Full name: Ernest Trevor Hall
- Born: 24 February 1905 Cambridge, New Zealand
- Died: 15 November 1961 (aged 56) Papakura, New Zealand

Playing information
- Position: Second-row, Lock
Club
Years	Team	Pld	T	G	FG	P
1926–29	Newton Rangers	43	10	0	0	30
1929–32	St. Helens	75	16	0	0	48
1932–34	Newton Rangers	37	19	0	0	57
1934–36	St. Helens	55	9	0	0	27
1936–37	Rochdale Hornets	34	3	0	0	9
	Total	244	57	0	0	171
Representative
Years	Team	Pld	T	G	FG	P
1927–34	Auckland	17	12	0	0	36
1928	Auckland Province	1	0	0	0	0
1928	New Zealand	2	0	0	0	0
1930	Other Nationalities	1	1	0	0	3
1932	North Island	1	0	0	0	0
1933	Auckland Trial	1	0	0	0	0
1937	Dominion XIII	2	0	0	0	0

Coaching information
Club
Years	Team	Gms	W	D	L	W%
193?	Rochdale Hornets

Ernest Trevor Hall (24 February 1905 – 15 November 1961) was a professional rugby league footballer who played in the 1920s and 1930s, and coached in the 1930s. He played at representative level for New Zealand, Other Nationalities, Auckland and Auckland City, and at club level for the Newton Rangers, St Helens (twice), and the Rochdale Hornets as a second-row or loose forward, and coached at club level for Rochdale Hornets.

== Playing career ==
=== International honours ===
Hall won caps for New Zealand. He played at second-row in the 5-13 defeat by England at Caledonian Ground, Dunedin on 18 August 1928, and played lock in the 5-6 defeat by England at English Park, Christchurch on 25 August 1928, and represented Other Nationalities while at St. Helens against England.

=== Regional honours ===
Hall represented Auckland in the 12-29 defeat by South Auckland in the 1927 Northern Union Cup, played lock in the 14-19 defeat by Great Britain on the 1932 Great Britain Lions tour of Australia and New Zealand during the 1932 New Zealand rugby league season, and represented Auckland City in the 15-26 defeat by Great Britain on the 1928 Great Britain Lions tour of Australia and New Zealand during the 1928 New Zealand rugby league season.

=== Challenge Cup Final appearances ===
Hall played at second-row in St. Helens' 3–10 defeat by Widnes in the 1929–30 Challenge Cup Final at Wembley Stadium, London on Saturday 3 May 1930, in front of a crowd of 36,544.

=== Club career ===
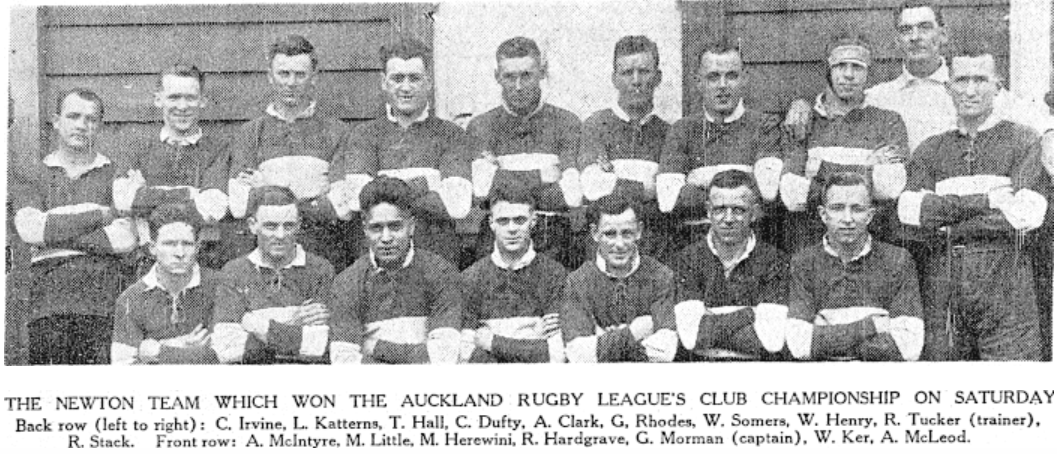

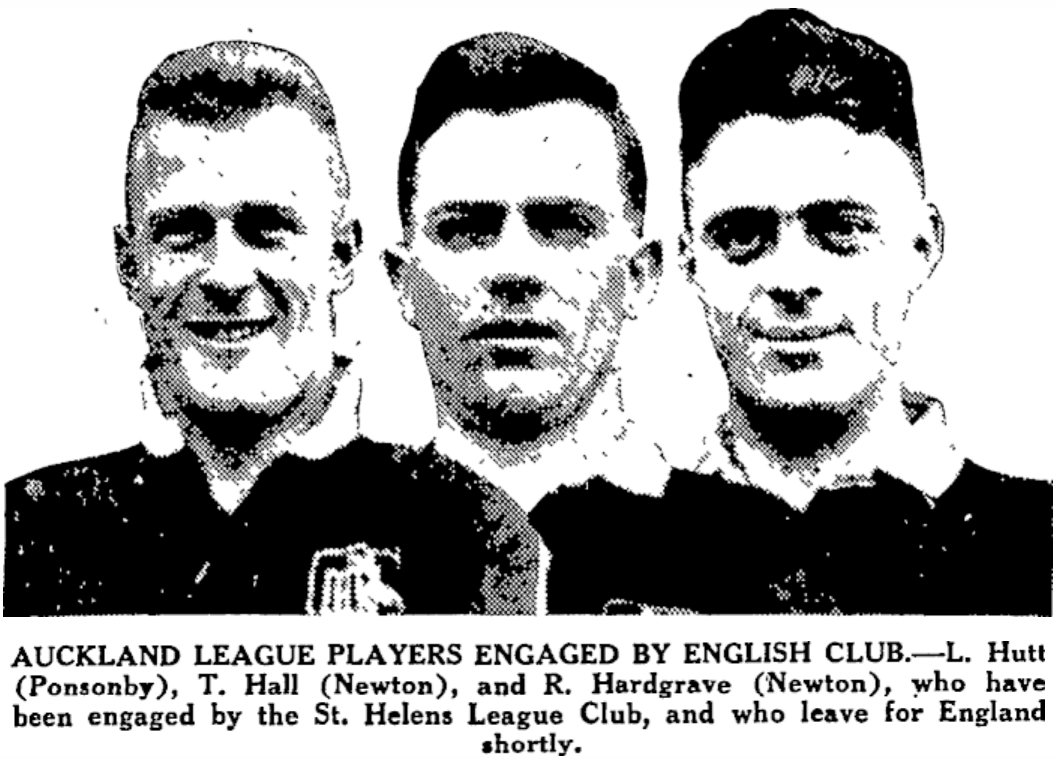
Lou Hutt, Trevor Hall, and Roy Hardgrave

Hall played in Newton Rangers' victory in the 1927 Auckland Rugby League's competition, and the 6-3 victory over Ponsonby in the 1927 Stormont Shield.
