= Maurice Wetherill =

New Zealand international rugby league footballer & referee (1898-1983)

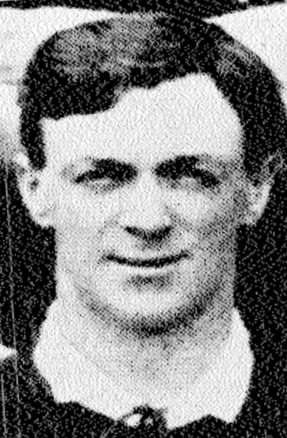

Personal information
- Full name: Maurice Charles Wetherill
- Born: 15 January 1898 Auckland, New Zealand
- Died: 19 March 1983 (aged 85) Auckland, New Zealand

Playing information
- Height: 5 ft 10 in (1.78 m)
- Weight: 10 st 7 lb (67 kg)
- Position: Wing, Stand-off, Halfback
Club
Years	Team	Pld	T	G	FG	P
1916–30	City Rovers ARL	127	38	49	0	212
Representative
Years	Team	Pld	T	G	FG	P
1921–30	Auckland	39	19	4	0	65
1922	Auckland Province	1	1	0	0	3
1924–30	New Zealand	20 (4)	5 (1)	0	0	15 (3)
1925–30	North Island	3	0	0	0	0
1928	New Zealand XIII	1	1	0	0	3

Coaching information
Representative
Years	Team	Gms	W	D	L	W%
1926	Auckland Juniors
1929	Northland	1	0	0	1	0
1930	City Rovers	16	8	2	6	50
1933	Hawke's Bay	1	0	0	1	0

Refereeing information
Years	Competition	Apps
1933–39	Auckland RL 1st Grade	88
1932–38	Domestic Representative	11
1935–37	Internationals	5

Maurice Wetherill was a New Zealand rugby league player who represented New Zealand from 1924 to 1930 and was Kiwi number 156.

== Early life ==
Maurice Wetherill was born in Auckland on 15 January 1898, the son of Maurice Charles Wetherill and Mary Ann Wetherill. He had a brother, James Ewart Wetherill, and a sister, Ivy Pearl Wetherill. He was a plumber by trade, and at the time of signing up for World War I, he was living on Ardmore Road in Ponsonby with his family and working for A.J. Letham.

== World War I ==
Maurice Wetherill enlisted in the armed forces on 27 February 1918, aged 20. At the time of his service his weight was recorded as 122lb, and his height 5 feet 5 inches. He commenced duty on 14 March 1918 and embarked for Suez, Egypt on the Moeraki on 11 October. The ship stopped in Sydney where the soldiers 'transhipped' to Malta to complete the journey. Wetherill was part of the Mounted Rifles – 43rd reinforcements.

He served in Egypt during the latter part of the war, and when his overseas duty was complete, he departed from Plymouth, England to New Zealand onboard the Hororata. Wetherill was discharged from duty on 18 October 1919, after 1 year and 219 days of duty, with 346 days served overseas. He later received the British War Medal for his service.

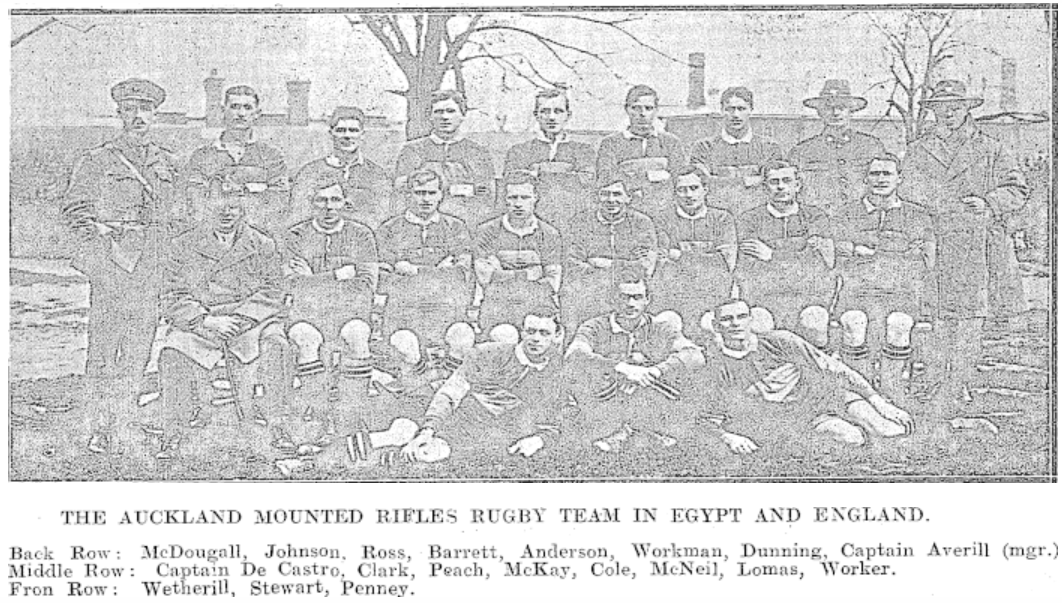
Maurice Wetherill seated on the left

== Playing career ==
Prior to departing for the war Wetherill debuted for the City Rovers senior side in 1917 in an end of season exhibition match against Ponsonby United at Victoria Park. He was aged just 17 and was promoted from their 4th grade side. He scored a try in a 13-12 win before a crowd of 4,500. He made his Auckland debut the same season when he came on to replace Bill Davidson in their match against a Military Representative side on October 13. After returning from the war Wetherill rejoined the City club and began regularly playing for the first grade side in 1920. He was small in stature, measuring just 5 feet 5 inches and spent his career playing in the halves or on the wing. In his first full season for City, he scored 4 tries and kicked 4 conversions, including a try on debut. In 1921 the City team won the Monteith Shield by winning the first grade championship. They also won the Roope Rooster trophy after defeating Maritime in the final by 30 points to 14 with Wetherill kicking a conversion.

=== Auckland ===
He played 7 matches for Auckland in 1921. His first match was against the New Zealand team at the Auckland Domain in front of 11,000 spectators. Auckland lost the match 22-16. He then played against Wellington for the Northern Union Challenge Cup which Auckland won 31-8. Wetherill then played 5 further matches all resulting in wins, against Hawkes Bay (18-3), Wellington (23-21), West Coast (47-7), Canterbury (38-14), and South Auckland (35-13).

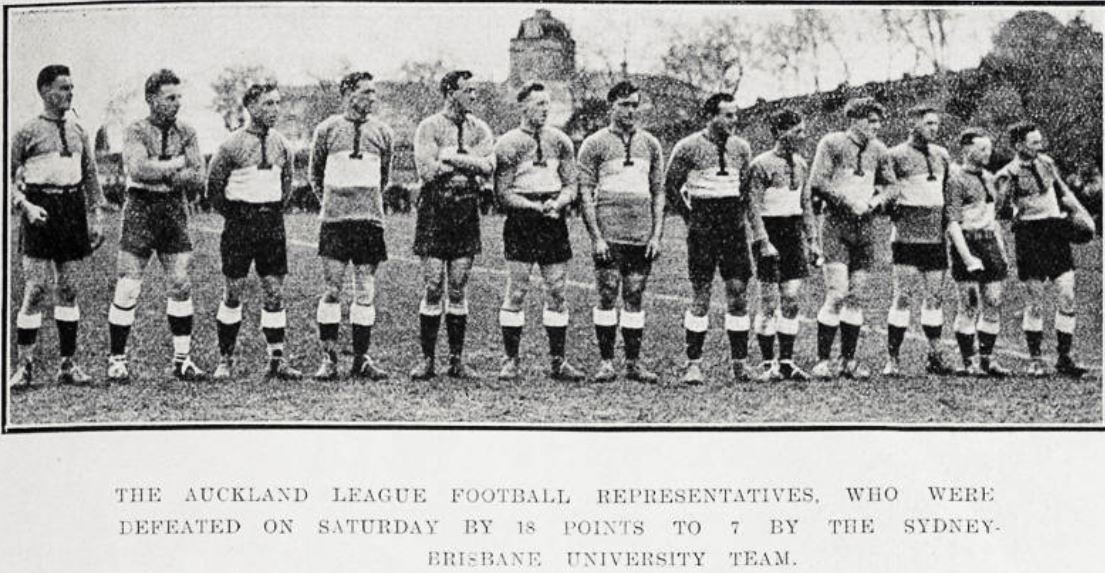
Wetherill 5th from the right in the Auckland team to play the 2nd match against the Australian Universities side at the Auckland Domain on June 24, 1922.

In 1922 Wetherill scored 8 tries during the season for City as they again won the first grade championship. Remarkably Wetherill played in 9 matches for Auckland. He scored a try in the 18-28 loss to New Zealand Māori. He then played 3 matches against the touring Australian University side scoring a try in the 3rd match. Wetherill turned out again for Auckland in a Northern Union Challenge Cup match against Hawkes Bay with Auckland retaining the trophy and Wetherill touching down for another try in a 23-5 win. Prior to this he has been part of the 73-29 thrashing of Cambridge where he crossed the line once. He then went on to play in a loss to South Auckland which saw the Northern Union Challenge Cup change hands. Wetherill was to represent Auckland against the touring New South Wales side where they were well beaten 25-40 with Wetherill kicking a conversion, and he played the same team 4 days later but playing for Auckland Province this time in a 20-21 defeat. His final representative match of the season was an Auckland effort to regain the Northern Union Challenge Cup from South Auckland which was unsuccessful. South Auckland win the match 26-18 and retained the trophy for the summer.

In 1923 he was part of the City Rovers team which won the first grade championship for the 3rd consecutive season. He played 2 matches for Auckland. The first was against the Auckland Province side which saw the city team win 44-15 with Wetherill scoring a try. While the second match was against South Auckland at Carlaw Park and on this occasion Wetherill scored twice in a 35-11 win.

=== New Zealand debut ===
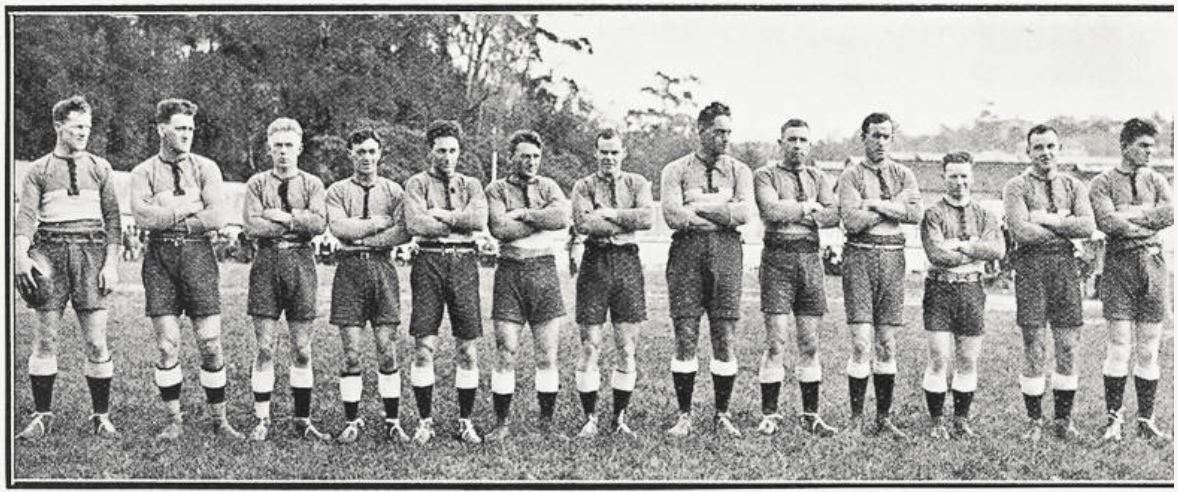
Wetherill 4th from the left in the Auckland team to play England on July 26, 1924.

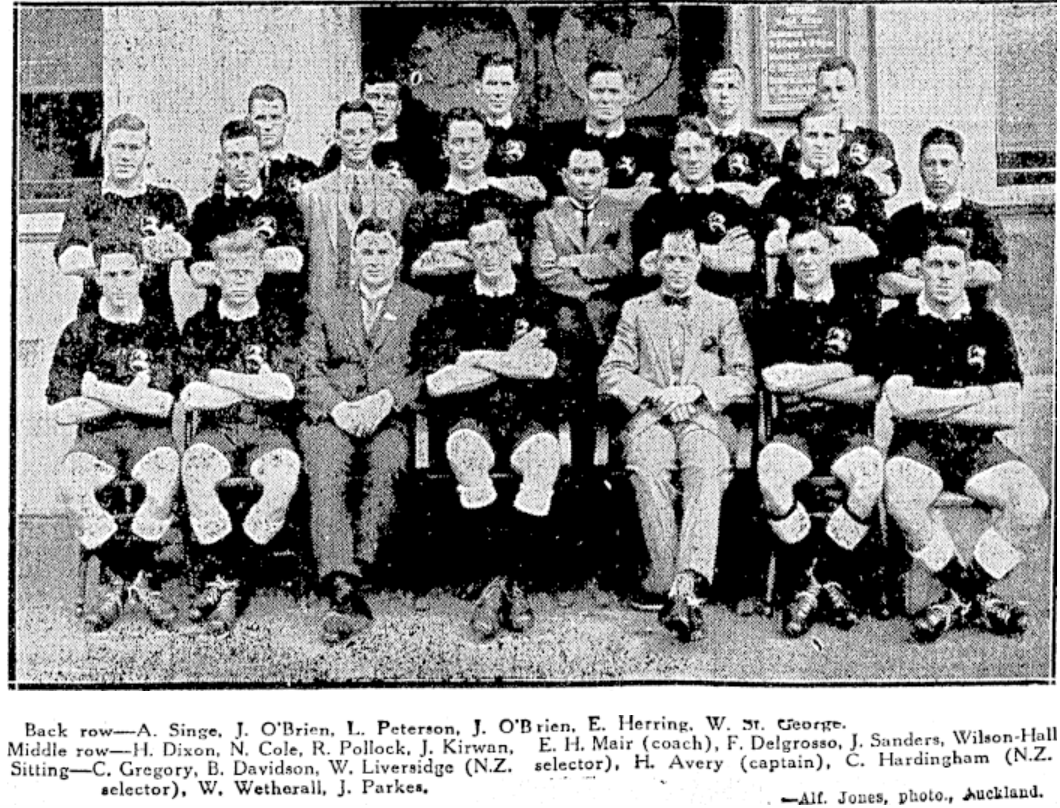
The New Zealand team which played the touring Queensland side in 1925.

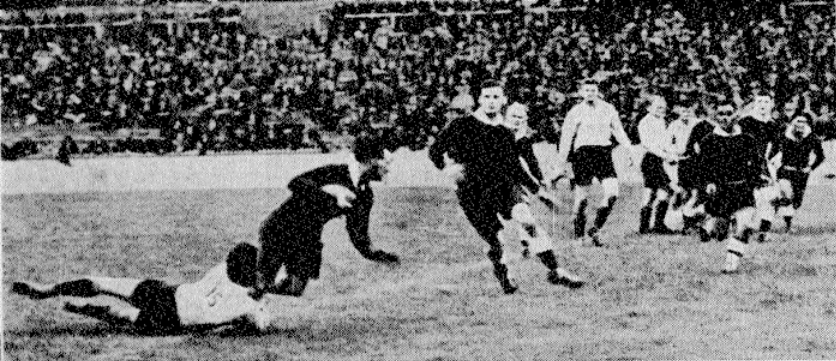
Wetherill being tackled with Allan Seagar in support in the Auckland v Northland match in 1930.

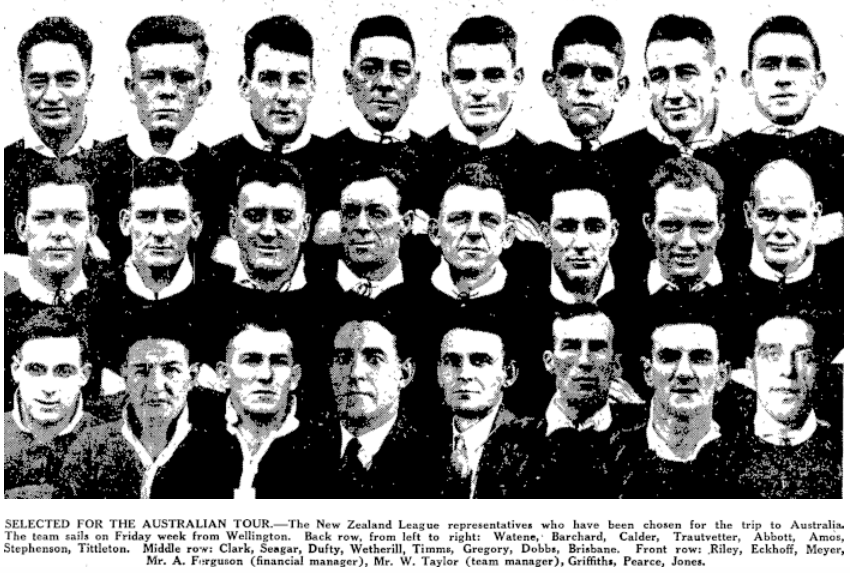

Wetherill played 5 matches for Auckland in 1924 and he also made his New Zealand debut. He played at halfback in the first test against the touring England side and scored New Zealand’s first try in the corner in a 16-8 win. Unfortunately Wetherill was unable to travel south to play in the remaining test matches which saw New Zealand lose twice and therefore lose the series 1-2.

The 1925 season saw Wetherill selected for the New Zealand team to tour Australia. His weight was listed as 10 stone, 7 pounds which was a significant increase on his weight when he had signed up for the war 5 years earlier. Wetherill played a remarkable 10 matches on the tour of Australia and a further 2 matches for New Zealand against Queensland when they toured New Zealand later in the year. While he missed many matches for City Rovers while on tour he still helped to captain the side to another first grade championship where they edged out Ponsonby United. Wetherill was the top point scorer in the 1926 club season in Auckland with 62 points. He was a likely inclusion in the New Zealand team to tour England but was unavailable for the tour with other commitments. Earlier in the season he had missed a match as he had a plumbing exam.

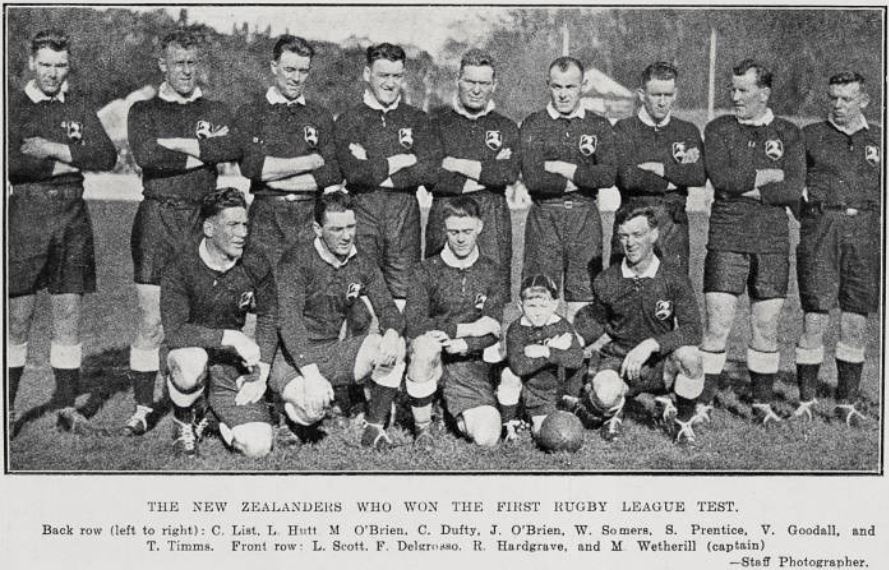
The NZ 1st test team at Carlaw Park on Aug 4, 1928.

He played all 3 test matches for New Zealand against the touring England team in 1928. Wetherill also toured Australia again in 1930, playing 4 more matches for New Zealand.

== Refereeing career ==
Following his retirement Wetherill became a referee. He refereed in the senior grade in Auckland for several seasons and refereed many representative matches. His first grade debut was on 16 July 1932 in an Auckland trial match between the Probables and Possibles. In 1935 he refereed the 1st and 2nd tests between New Zealand and Australia at Carlaw Park. In 1936 he refereed the 2nd test between New Zealand and England at Carlaw Park. When Australia toured in 1937 he again took charge of both matches at Carlaw Park.

== Personal life and death ==
Maurice’s father who was also named Maurice Charles Wetherill died in 1925, while his mother Mary died in 1932. He married Stella Jessen on 19 October 1923. They had two sons, Maurice George Wetherill and Desmond Charles Wetherill, and two daughters, Lola Mary Wetherill and Velma Wetherill. His son, Maurice died in 1970, Desmond in 1981, while his wife Stella died on 9 August 1964.

From 1919-28 he was living with wife Stella at 21 Sheehan Street according to electoral rolls and working as a plumber. In 1946 the electoral roll stated that they were living at 31 John Street and was working as a plumber with his wife and son Maurice also. In 1949 the electoral roll showed that Maurice, Stella, Desmond, Lola, and Maurice jr were all living at 31 John Street. In 1954 they were living at 123 Crummer Road minus son. Then in 1957 he and Stella had moved to 3 Dublin Street and they remained there until at least 1963.

Maurice Wetherill died on 19 March 1983 aged 85.
