= Jim O'Brien =

Jim O'Brien may refer to:

== Sports ==
=== Basketball ===
- Jim O'Brien (basketball, born 1950), American coach for Emerson College, Ohio State and Boston College
- Jim O'Brien (basketball, born 1951), American player for the New York Nets and Memphis Sounds
- Jim O'Brien (basketball, born 1952), American coach for the Boston Celtics, Philadelphia 76ers, and Indiana Pacers

=== Football and rugby ===
- Jim O'Brien (American football) (born 1947), professional football player
- Jim O'Brien (Australian footballer) (1936–1996), Australian rules footballer for St Kilda
- Jimmy O'Brien (footballer) (1885–1954), Australian rules footballer for Essendon
- Jim O'Brien (footballer, born 1987), Scottish footballer
- Jim O'Brien (rugby, born 1897) (1897–1969), New Zealand dual-code rugby international
- Jim O'Brien (rugby league, born 1896) (1896–1988), New Zealand rugby league player
- Jimmy O'Brien (rugby union), Irish rugby union player
- Jamie O'Brien (footballer) (born 1990), Irish association footballer

=== Hurling ===
- Jim O'Brien (Limerick hurler) (born 1945), Irish hurler for Limerick
- Jim O'Brien (Tipperary hurler), Irish hurler
- Jimmy O'Brien (hurler) (born 1937), Irish hurler for Wexford

=== Other sports ===
- Jim O'Brien (ice hockey) (born 1989), American ice hockey center

== Other ==
- Jim O'Brien (director) (1947–2012), Scottish-born stage and television director
- Jim O'Brien (reporter) (1939–1983), reporter and television personality
- Jim O'Brien, founder and CEO of oil spill cleanup company The O'Brien's Group

== See also ==
- James O'Brien (disambiguation)
- Jamie O'Brien (disambiguation)
- Jimmy O'Brien (disambiguation)
