= James O'Brien =

James O'Brien may refer to:

== Politicians ==
- James O'Brien (died 1771), Irish nobleman and politician
- James O'Brien (1806–1882), Irish judge and British MP for Limerick City
- James O'Brien (Canadian politician) (1836–1903), Canadian senator
- James O'Brien (New Brunswick politician) (1824–1922), Canadian blacksmith and political figure in New Brunswick
- James O'Brien (New Zealand politician) (1874–1947), New Zealand politician
- James O'Brien (Nova Scotia politician) (1859–1932), Canadian politician and political figure in Nova Scotia
- James O'Brien (U.S. Congressman) (1841–1907), United States Representative from New York
- James Bronterre O'Brien (1805–1864), Irish-born Chartist leader, reformer and journalist
- J. F. X. O'Brien (James Francis Xavier O'Brien, 1828–1905), Irish rebel and British MP
- James H. O'Brien (1860–1924), United States Representative from New York
- Jay O'Brien (Virginia politician) (born 1951), American politician in Virginia
- James C. O'Brien, Assistant Secretary of State for European and Eurasian Affairs during the Biden administration
- James William O'Brien (1879–1960), American farmer and politician

== Others ==
- James O'Brien, 3rd Marquess of Thomond (1769–1855), British naval officer
- James O'Brien (broadcaster) (born 1972), British journalist and presenter, primarily on LBC radio
- James O'Brien (sprinter) (1925–1988), Canadian sprinter
- James O'Brien (hurler) (born 1983), Irish hurler
- James O'Brien (internet radio) (born 1973), Canadian internet radio journalist, founder and producer of RantMedia
- James O'Brien (oceanographer) (1935–2016), American oceanographer
- James O'Brien (piper) (1823–1885), Irish musician
- James F. O'Brien, American computer graphics researcher
- James O'Brien (filmmaker) (born 1969), American film director, screenwriter and producer
- James Joseph O'Brien (1930–2007), British clergyman
- James O'Brien (horticulturist) (1842–1930), winner of the Victoria Medal of Honour
- James O'Brien (sprinter, born 1896), American sprinter and winner of the 300 yards at the 1921 USA Indoor Track and Field Championships
- James O'Brien, Australian musician, bassist for The Boat People (active since 2000)
- James J. O'Brien was one of many known aliases used by con artist George C. Parker (1860–1937)

== See also ==
- Jamie O'Brien (disambiguation)
- Jim O'Brien (disambiguation)
