= Neville St George =

New Zealand international rugby league footballer

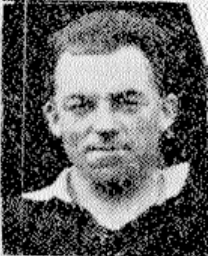

Personal information
- Full name: Robert Neville St George
- Born: 2 July 1897 Papatoetoe, Auckland, New Zealand
- Died: 27 October 1980 (aged 83) Papatoetoe, Auckland, New Zealand

Playing information
- Height: 5 ft 9 in (1.75 m)
- Weight: 13 st 3 lb (84 kg)
- Position: Hooker
Club
Years	Team	Pld	T	G	FG	P
1919–21	Marist Old Boys	15	0	4	0	8
1921–30	Devonport United	123	6	12	0	42
	Total	138	6	16	0	50
Representative
Years	Team	Pld	T	G	FG	P
1921–28	Auckland Trial	3	0	0	0	0
1922	Auckland B	1	0	0	0	0
1922–28	Auckland Province	2	0	0	0	0
1922–28	Auckland	8	2	1	0	8
1925	North Island	1	0	0	0	0
1925	New Zealand	2	0	0	0	0
1926	New Zealand Trial	1	0	0	0	0
- Relatives: Ed St George (brother)

Robert Neville St George (2 July 1897 – 27 October 1980) was a rugby league footballer. He represented the New Zealand rugby league team in 2 test matches in 1925. In the process he became the 178th player to represent New Zealand. He also represented the North Island and Auckland representative side. St George played his club rugby league in Auckland for the Marist Old Boys side initially before moving to Devonport United (North Shore Albions) where he spent most of his career.

== Early life ==
Robert Neville St George was born on 2 July 1897 in the Auckland suburb of Papatoetoe, New Zealand. While his first name was Robert he went by Neville for much of his life, reverting to Robert later. His parents were Lillian Neville, and Robert Montgomery St George. Robert Sr. had been born in Papakura, Auckland, in 1874 and Lillian had come to New Zealand as an infant and lived in Onehunga, Auckland. Lillian died on 12 October 1916, aged 42 when Neville was 19 years old and his father Robert remarried in 1919 to Fanny Jewell Huxtable. Neville's religion was stated as being Presbyterian on his enlistment form. He had 6 siblings, the eldest born in 1886 was unnamed in the New Zealand Births, Deaths and Marriages records, Stewart Lyell (b.1899), Lillian Edith Melba (b.1903), Laurel Margaret (b.1906), Ella Mavis (b.1908), and Allen Alfred St George (b.1910). Allen, better known as Ed would also go on to represent New Zealand at rugby league in 1932 and the two hookers would directly oppose each other on two occasions in club rugby league in 1930.

== World War 1 ==
Neville was a fitter by trade and at the time of his enlistment in World War 1 was living at Pine Lodge, Great North Road, Grey Lynn. His last employer at the time was “Westfield Freezing Works, Westfield” and he had spent some time living at 53 Williamson Avenue in late 1917. He also listed 24 Bond Street in Devonport as an address. It was this suburb that he would spend much of his following years living in.

St George enlisted for the war effort on 18 October 1917 and embarked on 23 April 1918, on board the Willochra, disembarking in the Suez. St George served overseas for 1 year, 32 days. He suffered from influenza at one point and was admitted to hospital on 18 October 1918, then again was taken to hospital on 3 February 1919, before being considered no longer physically fit for war service “on account of illness contracted on active service” though the war was in its final stages by this point. St George was discharged on 25 July 1919. He was awarded the British War Medal and the Victory Medal.

== Playing career ==
=== Marist Old Boys rugby league club ===
Soon after returning from the war St George joined the newly formed Marist Old Boys rugby league club who had been admitted to the first grade championship in their inaugural season of 1919. He had recently turned 22 years of age. On 26 July he was listed in the match day squad for the seniors against North Shore Albions for their Roope Rooster round 1 match but it is unlikely he took the field. He appears to have made his debut on 16 August in their semi final loss to Maritime 22–21. He took Marist's goal kicks and the Auckland Star wrote that “St George did quite well at goal kicking. If he had made the same success of some of the easy kicks as he did of a very difficult one his side would have been the conquerors”. He converted their second try before he had “a shot at goal from between the halfway and twenty-five lines, [kicking] a beautiful goal just as halftime sounded” to make the score 11–10 to Maritime. He played in a curtain raiser between Marist and Maritime on 20 September, which acted as a curtain raiser to the match between Auckland v Australia match at Carlaw Park.

The 1920 season saw St George establish a regular spot in the playing thirteen of the Marist 1st grade side. He was also elected on to their management committee. He played in 11 of their 13 matches. His only points of the season came in round 2 when he kicked a penalty goal in a 5–5 draw with Newton Rangers. After a round 3 loss to Maritime at Victoria Park before a crowd of 3,000 the Observer newspaper said that he and Tait "were the most prominent forwards". The following week he was part of the Marist side which won the clubs first ever match on the first grade competition after they had failed to register a victory in 1919. The only other specific mention of him during a match report was after a 10–5 win over City Rovers in the final round of the first grade championship on the Auckland Domain before a crowd of 6,000. During the second half “the Marist forwards broke away, and St George, getting the ball, had a clear run for a try, but was outpaced and tackled close to the line”. With the win the Marist side finished the season in third place with a 7 win, 1 draw, 3 loss record.

The 1921 season saw St George play only about 2 matches for Marist which were at the beginning of the season. The newspapers published squad lists and St George's name was appearing well beyond the first thirteen names listed from rounds 3 onwards. Then at the 13 July Auckland Rugby League management committee meeting he had his transfer request to North Shore Albions approved. It is unknown if he had requested a transfer due to not receiving playing time for Marist or because he had moved to the Devonport area where North Shore were based.

=== Move to Devonport United (North Shore Albions) ===
After transferring to Devonport United, St George made his first grade debut almost immediately, playing for them against Ponsonby on 16 July in the first round of the Roope Rooster at the Auckland Domain. Devonport lost the match 34–11. Just two weeks later St George was selected to play in an Auckland trial match to help select two touring teams to travel south. He was chosen in the Probables side in the prop position. The match was to be a curtain raiser to the Auckland match against Wellington at the newly opened Carlaw Park. St George missed selection for the Auckland tour and it was his last match for the season.

=== Auckland selection ===
The 1922 season was very different for St George. He played in 15 matches for the Devonport first grade side and also played in 4 representative or trial matches. In Devonport's first championship match of the season at the Devonport Domain he scored 2 tries and kicked a penalty in a 32–17 loss to City. His first try came a “after a scramble on City’s line [where he] managed to notch a try”, while the second came after he chased a long kick and he “picked the leather up and dashed over”. He also set up their last try with a cross field kick. Then on full time St George featured in their final try after he “kicked over the City line”, with Alf Scott scoring. He played in 4 further matches before being mentioned in a match report for the 20–8 loss to Ponsonby. The Auckland Star said that “the best of the Devonport forwards were [Alf] Scott, St George, and Wheeler, and in the backs Stan Webb, Bert Laing, and Tommy Taylor”. Laing was a current New Zealand rugby league international, and Webb would go on to become one in the mid-1920s. Against City on 1 July it was reported that “St George and [Charles] Hand were prominent among the pack” for Devonport. On 15 July in a 21–7 win over Fire Brigade he set up a try when he picked up “and sent the ball out to Douglas who scored”. He missed the conversion. The Star said that he played “a great game” along with several other members of their forward pack. He scored a try and kicked a conversion in a 37–15 win over Richmond Rovers at the Auckland Domain. His try came after he took a pass from Douglas near the line following a long run down field by Wheeler whose kick was gathered by Douglas.

St George then played 3 more matches for Devonport before being selected in the Auckland B team to play Cambridge. The full Auckland team was playing Hawke's Bay at Carlaw Park on the same day. The match was played at Victoria Square in Cambridge and saw Auckland B win 22–8. After the match the Waikato Independent newspaper said that in the middle stages “St George was hooking to advantage for the visitors, and the visiting rear guard began a series of rear guard movements which were fine to watch”. He took a conversion attempt late in the match which missed.

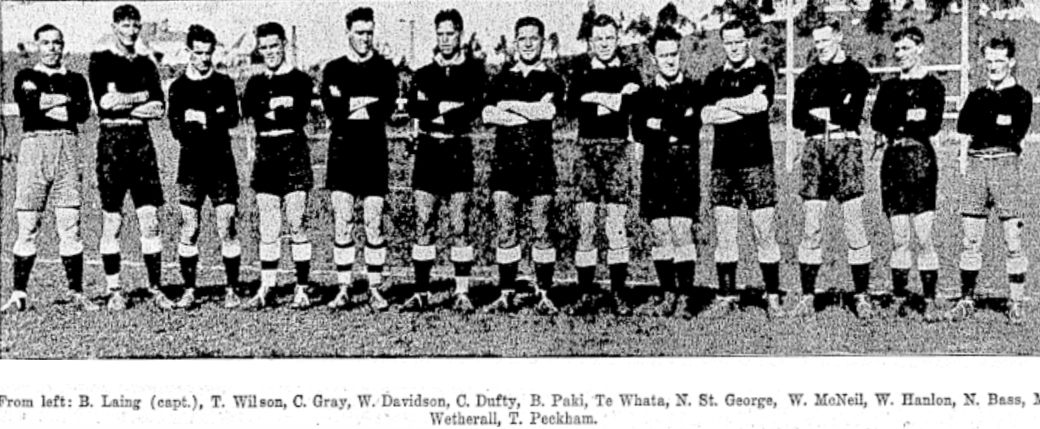
St George in the 1922 Auckland Province team to play New South Wales at the Auckland Domain.

St George played in Devonport's final match of the season which was Roope Rooster first round loss to City before being selected to play for Auckland Province against the touring New South Wales side. The Auckland Province side was a team selected from the greater region including the Waikato which at the time included the 'South Auckland' competition which was based in the northern Waikato. The teams were however generally dominated by Auckland club players. The match was played at the Auckland Domain before a crowd of over 5,000 and saw New South Wales win narrowly, 21–20.

Then, on 7 October, St George was selected to make his full Auckland debut in a match against a newly formed and short lived Bay of Plenty team at the Tauranga Domain. St George played at prop, with Wally Somers in the hooking position. Auckland won the match 33 points to 26.

The 1923 season saw St George play 14 matches for Devonport but no representative matches at all. His only points were a single conversion in a match against Newton on 28 July, and a conversion against City on 8 September. Following the later match he was chosen in the reserves for Auckland Province in a match against Auckland but he did not take the field. The 1924 season saw St George play 17 matches for Devonport and once again he was not selected for any representative matches. After Devonport's round 2 match against Ellerslie United he was said to be prominent among their players. The following week St George was sent off midway through the second half for the first time in his career along with future New Zealand representative Alf Townsend of City. They were opposing hookers and there had been issues with the scrum with the New Zealand Herald commenting “the action of the referee, Mr [Les] Bull, in sending the City and Devonport hookers off the field on Saturday, might be taken as the first step on the part of referees to make a serious attempt to improve the scrums”. Two weeks later against Ponsonby he was said to be “prominent” along with captain Alf Scott. Following a win over Athletic on 21 June, the Herald said that “St George is a much improved player, and is a tower of strength to his side”. His only points of the season came in a 32–13 win over Mangere Rangers at Victoria Park. His successful conversion gave Devonport a 27–0 lead. He appeared to only attempt goal kicks occasionally for Devonport and mostly late in matches. The Auckland Star in the same match said that St George was “always to the fore in forward movements” along with Jim O'Brien. Devonport were having their best season since 1916 when they came second in the championship. After 15 matches Devonport had a 11 win, 1 draw, 3 loss record, while Marist Old Boys were 2 points behind them but with a game in hand. The Auckland Rugby League decided to make the two teams play off for the title and Marist won narrowly by 20 points to 17 before a club record crowd of 17,000 at Carlaw Park.

=== North Island selection ===
The 1925 season was the busiest and most significant of St George's career. He played in 22 matches, including 4 for Auckland, 1 for the North Island, and his only 2 appearances for New Zealand. In a round 4 loss to Ponsonby it was said that “St George’s hooking of the ball in the scrums was a feature of the play, and he beat a recognised hooker like Lowrie badly”. A week later in a match with Athletic he “gave his side a good share of the ball and in this department he has shown much improvement”.

After 4 further matches for Devonport, St George was named as a reserve for an A and B team trial but was then named for the Auckland C team to play South Auckland on 27 June. Ultimately however he did end up playing for the Auckland A team against Auckland B. Auckland B lost the match 5 points to 0 at Carlaw Park.

After the match was completed St George took a place on the reserve bench for the North Island team to play the South Island in the inaugural inter island match. Typically reserves did not take the field as they were only permitted to replace injured players, and often this was only allowed in the first half of matches. However, during the first half Alf Townsend, the North Island hooker, broke a rib and did not take the field for the start of the second half, instead being replaced by St George. The North Island led 11–7 at the break and went on to win 27 points to 9 in rainy, muddy conditions. After the match the New Zealand selectors chose the 23 man touring squad to travel to Australia. St George was not selected and the Auckland Star stated: “St George (Devonport) is a hooker who must have just missed a trip”. Prior to the New Zealand teams departure they played against Auckland with St George hooking for the local side. The New Zealand side won 16–9. During the first half the Herald said that “St George kept beating Lowrie for the ball” in the scrums.

St George then returned to the Devonport side for their second to last match in the championship. They defeated Newton Rangers 11–3 with it said that “St George, in the forwards, played a fine game, showing to good advantage in the loose play”. They lost their last match and finished in 4th place of the 7 sides. His final matches for them in the season were their 15-12 first round win over his former side Marist in the Roope Rooster and their 22-11 semi final loss to City on 15 August.

=== New Zealand selection ===
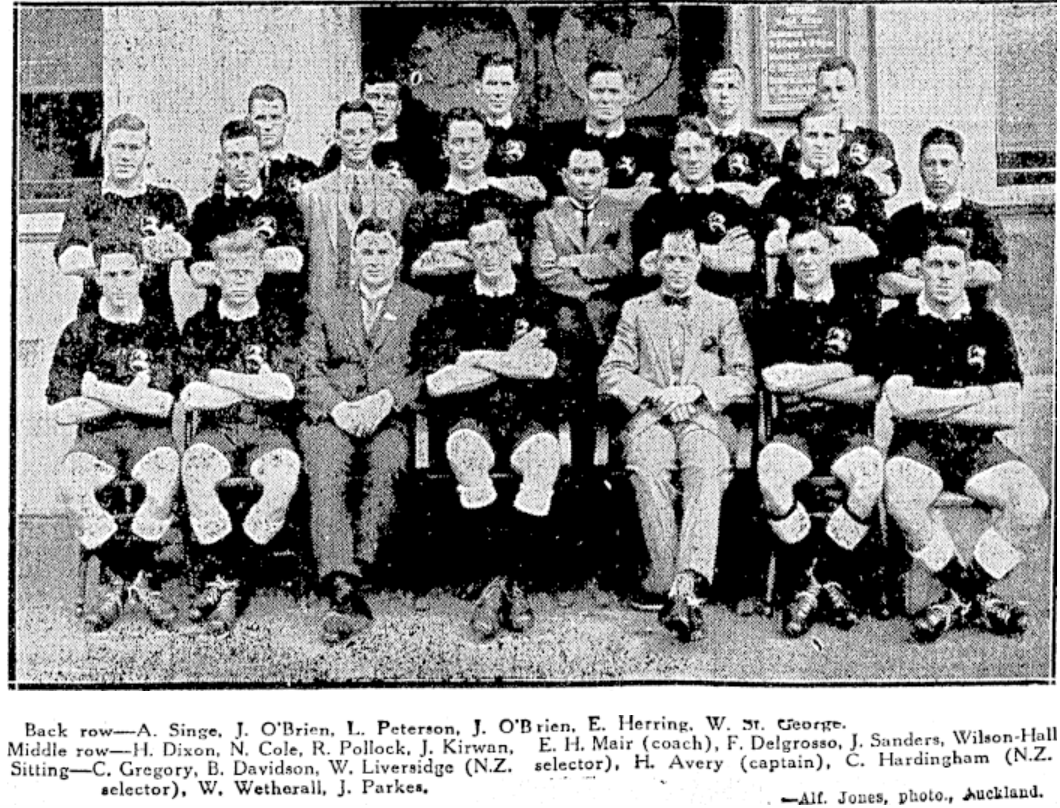
New Zealand team to play Queensland

St George was selected for the Auckland team to play the returning New Zealand side from Australia. He was called into the side to replace the unavailable Alf Townsend for the 29 August match. Auckland was well beaten, by 41 points to 27 in the match at Carlaw Park before a crowd of over 15,000. Early in the match Arthur Singe picked the ball “up off the ground [and] whipped the leather to St George, who scored in a good position”. After the conversion the score was tied at 5-5.

St George was then named in the New Zealand test side to play against the touring Queensland side. His weight was given as 13 stone, 3 pounds. The Auckland Star said “St George, who has given some fine exhibitions of hooking this season, will be making his first appearance in big football, but he has earned his place and can be relied upon to get his share of the ball”. He would be between his Devonport teammate Jim O'Brien, and Ernie Herring of Athletic and was matched against Jim Bennett who played had played 3 matches for Australia in 1924 and would represent Queensland on 36 occasions from 1921 to 1930.

The first test was played on 5 September at Carlaw Park and saw 18,000 spectators in attendance. New Zealand won a thrilling match by 25 points to 24. Queensland had led 19 to 5 at one point before a spirited comeback by the New Zealand side with St George involved in several attacking movements. After the match the Auckland Star said that “Herring, Singe and St George were good”. He was then named in the Auckland side to play the tourists in a midweek fixture, once again matched up with Jim Bennett. This time he stood between Jim O'Brien once more and his name sake Jim O'Brien of Marist Old Boys. Auckland drew the match 18-18 once again at Carlaw Park before a crowd of 6,000.

St George was then selected for the New Zealand side for the second test, again at Carlaw Park, on 13 September. This time his propping partner would be the Marist version of Jim O'Brien and Ernie Herring once more on his other side. And for the third time he was against Jim Bennett in the middle of the Queensland front row. The Devonport Jim O'Brien dropping back into the second row. Queensland ran out comfortable winners by 35 points to 14. The Herald said that “the visiting forwards played solidly and won the ball from the scrum on the majority of occasions, although the New Zealand hooker, St George, did his part well”. St George's final match of the season was for Auckland in a Northern Union Challenge Cup match against South Auckland. After trailing for some time Auckland came back strongly to win 36 to 19. St George scored Auckland's final try late in the match after he “broke away and ran over to score” with Frank Delgrosso converting.

=== Continuation of Auckland selection 1926-28 ===
In 1926 St George played 3 matches for Auckland, and played in a New Zealand trial to help the selectors pick the 26 man touring side for the England and Wales tour. He only played 10 games for Devonport during the season after suffering an injury in their season opening match against Ponsonby on 24 April. In the match he was well matched by Ponsonby hooker, Stevens, but Devonport lost Lyall Stewart to injury after 20 minutes and then in the second half they lost Julius Laing and Clarence Webb also to injury and ended up with just 3 players in their forward pack (St George, Jim O'Brien, and Horace Dixon). Devonport had led 21–16 at the time but could not hold on and lost 31–21. The New Zealand Herald said that “St George aided his team by securing a good share of the ball from the scrum”. The newspaper made no mention of St George's injury but noted that “in at least three cases, [they were] so severe that it will be many weeks before they can again assist their teams”. The following week they lost to Richmond and it was said “Devonport missed their hooker, St George, and rarely got possession from the scrums”.

He returned to play in round 6 on 5 June, in a win over City 14-5 where he kicked a conversion. It was Devonport's first win of the season after at one stage having “eight of their best players on the side-line with injuries”. “The winners were reinforced by Webb, Cleaver, Stewart and St George, all good players who had been injured early in the season, and there is no doubt that the quartet made a big difference”. After the 12 June matches the Herald speculated on who might be selected for the New Zealand side and said “among the local players there is no outstanding hooker, but several get their share of the ball every Saturday. St George (Devonport) has represented New Zealand in this position on several occasions, and has often met with success. Somers (Newton) is perhaps the best hooker in the code, but his play is not up to representative standard. No forward, however, has greater claims than Townsend (City), whose success against Queensland last season is readily recalled…”.

The following week Devonport played Ponsonby and “St George and Lowrie about evenly divided the hooking honours”. St George was then picked in a 20-man Auckland squad to go into training to play against Waikato on 26 June. The choice of hooker was between him and Townsend and in the end the selectors chose Townsend with St George on the reserve bench. On 3 July St George played in a New Zealand trial match for an A Team against a B Team, although the match was a curtain raiser to the inter-island match between the North Island and South Island. His 'A Team' lost 25 points to 16 at Carlaw Park. In a 31-13 Devonport win over Marist Old Boys on 24 July “St George made an opening and sent Len Scott away with a 40 yards run” for a try. He was also involved in a try to Allan Seagar. It was reported that he “gave his side the greater share of the ball from the scrums and also showed good form I other departments. After the match he was named in the Auckland reserves to meet the New Zealand team which was departing for the tour of England and Wales. He was then named in the starting side, with Townsend unavailable. The Auckland side won easily by 52 points to 32 before a crowd of 14,000. St George kicked a conversion late in the match which gave Auckland a 47-24 lead. He was then chosen for the Auckland squad to prepare for a match against Otago.

St George’s failure to make the New Zealand touring side was commented on in the Auckland Star in early August:"[Alphonsus] Carroll is a failure as a hooker and why the selectors preferred him to St George or Townsend is hard to understand". In the match between Auckland and the touring side the Herald said “St George has on many occasions proved himself a capable hooker, but on Saturday he was at his best and outplayed Carroll, his vis-à-vis. Auckland gained the ball from scrums with monotonous regularity”.

St George supposedly next played for Auckland in their match with Otago at Carlaw Park on 7 August. He was named in the match day side at prop but was not mentioned in match reports and prop Harry Douglas who was not named in the side reportedly came off injured so it is more likely he didn't play. Auckland won by 14 points to 4 to retain the Northern Union Challenge Cup. Auckland of course were missing 14 of their players from selection who had gone on tour. He was selected again for Auckland in their match with Canterbury on 28 August. Auckland won by 33 points to 15 before a crowd of 7,000 at Carlaw Park.

He played in 3 further matches for Devonport to finish the season including in their Roope Rooster final loss to Richmond Rovers on 16 October. A week prior he had been named as a reserve in Auckland's match with South Auckland but did not play.

Early in 1927 it was rumoured that St George and Alf Townsend had been approached by the newly formed City rugby union club to play for them. The City delegate to the Auckland Rugby Union had said that they would not poach rugby players and would “include not more than two ex-League players”. Then on 5 April Mr. J.J. Hamill, chairman of Auckland Rugby League received a letter from P. Kelly and “certified by A.C. Townsend and R.N. St George [stating]: “You will probably have read the report of the Rugby Union’s meeting in last Tuesday’s ‘Star’ and note the statement that the new City club would countenance no pirating from the existing rugby clubs or from another code. For your information I shall explain that on two occasions during the last three weeks a deputation (whose names were given) waited on Messrs R.N. St George and A.C. Townsend at the Newmarket railway workshops, the object being to induce the league players named to join up with the new City rugby union club. It is pleasing to record the loyalty of the two league players and the failure of the deputation”.

In April, St George was selected to train for the Auckland match against the returning New Zealand team from their controversial England and Wales tour which had seen 7 players eventually banned for life for striking during the tour. He was listed in the reserves for the match but ultimately played in place of Townsend. Auckland won the match by 24 points to 21. He was opposed by Jim Parkes at hooker and it was noticed by reporters that the New Zealand forwards remained in the scrum until the ball was hooked clear. They had been criticised in England for breaking from the scrum too early and not supporting their hooker enough. They noted that “Parkes was therefore more than able to hold his own with the opposing hooker, St George”. They went on to say that “St George raked splendidly” and “gave his side plenty of the ball”.

St George's first game for Devonport came in their opening match of the championship on 7 May against City Rovers. He was once again up against one of his hooking rivals, Alf Townsend. City won the match 23-19 but the Auckland Star said that “St George ranking with a larger share of success than his vis-a-vis”. He kicked a conversion in a 12–8 loss to Marist, and then a penalty in a 47–3 win over Grafton as well as setting up a try. In their next match with Richmond Rovers, won by Devonport 17-13 St George kicked a penalty but was later sent off after having words with the referee. Shortly afterwards Stewart (Richmond), Stan Prentice (Richmond), and Jim O'Brien (Devonport) were also sent off. At this point of the season the Auckland Star wrote a review of the season and when discussing the prospects of the hookers for possible representative honours said “there are two first rate players in Lowrie and Somers, with St George and A. Townsend for a further choice”. These four players were the dominant hookers in Auckland for the greater part of the 1920s. In Devonport's match with Ponsonby on 11 June St George scored a rare try in their 9–6 win at Carlaw Park before 7,000 spectators. He “plunged over” after picking up the ball near the line in muddy conditions after Horace Dixon was tackled on the line and the ball rolled free. He was singled out by the Auckland Star which said “St George is deserving of worthy mention for the reason that he invariably beat a champion hooker in Lowrie for the ball in the set scrums”. While the Herald said “the wet turf suited St George, who played his best game this season”. He scored again the following week in a 32–8 win over Newton Rangers at the Devonport Domain before 1,000 local supporters. His try came “from a melee in midfield, [where he] secured and threaded his way through the opposition, crossing well out”. He was given kicking duties late in the match but missed both conversion attempts. The next time Devonport played Ponsonby St George was up against Kenneth Peckham at hooker. The Sun newspaper said that “Ken Peckham, who hooked for the Ponies, is after the style of a rugby hooker, inasmuch as he works with one leg. But it did not take the veteran leaguer, St George, very long to see this weak point, and he wasted no time in “cooking” Ken's tactics in the front row”. He was then selected as a reserve for Auckland's match with Buller. Wally Somers had been selected at hooker but had broken a bone in his foot, however St George also became unavailable and Joseph Peckham came into the side. He was then picked to play for Auckland against South Auckland on 15 October but declared himself unavailable on the Friday. Unusually Auckland chose not to play a recognised hooker and instead used Payne, and they lost the match 29-12 and the Northern Union Challenge Cup for the first time in 5 years. He finished his season playing for Devonport in a charity match for the unemployment fund against Ponsonby on 22 October.

=== Auckland v England ===
The 1928 season saw St George play 13 games for Devonport. After a 24-6 round 1 win over City the Auckland Star said that he showed “excellent form” along with others in their forward pack. Then, following a 12–7 win in round 4 over Richmond the Herald said that he had gained “the ball time and again”. The Sun newspaper featured a portrait photograph of him and said “without the services of St George there is just the possibility that Shore may have lost the game. As a hooker St George, a big hefty fellow, is a crack-a-jack, and from 90 percent of the scrums he got the ball, and this gave the “black” rearguard members some golden opportunities which in many cases they took full advantage of”. He missed the next match against Ponsonby with his place taken by Ernest Ruby. They “sadly missed [his] services” with Ponsonby dominating the scrums.

With the representative season approaching the newspapers noted that St George and Wally Somers “have shown enough form to warrant serious consideration when it comes to choosing a hooker”. The Sun said in the same week that “St George, that invincible hooker, can always be relied upon to secure the ball from the majority of the scrums”. He was chosen in the reserves for Auckland's first match of the season against South Auckland, with Somers preferred at hooker. A few weeks later he played against Somers when Devonport met Newton on 30 June. Newton won 23–16 at Carlaw Park with the Herald saying “St George surprised by his ability in getting the ball from the scrums against such a fine hooker as Somers. It was only in the final stages when the Devonport forwards were tiring that Somers gained the advantage, which up to that point was in favour of his opponent”.

Following a match against Marist Old Boys on 7 July, St George was selected for an Auckland Possibles team to play a trial. He was opposed by Gordon Campbell of Marist in the midweek match. It was said that “there was not a great deal between St George and Campbell as hookers on the full run of the day, but the Devonport man was a shade the best, and has the physique for the middle of the front arch”. He was chosen in the practice squad for the Auckland match with Canterbury on 21 July but was only picked in the reserves for the match with Payne chosen at hooker. He was however selected to start in Auckland's next match against South Auckland on 25 July but was replaced by Somers before the match.

St George was then chosen in the reserves for the Auckland Province to play the touring England side on 8 August. However he replaced Bob Stephenson from the Waikato in the starting side. He was matched up again Ben Halfpenny, the St. Helens R.F.C player. England won the match by 14 points to 9 before 15,000 spectators at Carlaw Park.

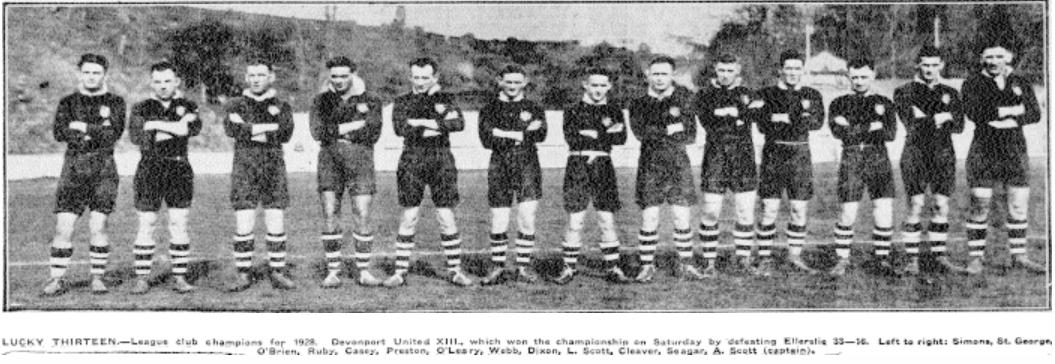

St George then returned to the Devonport side which won their 3rd first grade championship after a 14-year wait since their previous wins in 1913 and 1914. A picture of the victorious side was taken after their win over Ellerslie which sealed the title on 1 September. He then played in the Stormont Shield final against Marist with Devonport losing 9–8. He showed "clear cut superiority in the scrums".

=== Final years of career 1929-1930 ===
It appeared as though St George had semi retired from the sport as he did not start the 1929, missing their first 4 matches. It was speculated in the Sun newspaper after 3 matches that “it is on the cards that St George and ”Snowy” Dixon may be seen out with Devonport in the big game next Saturday. League fans would welcome their return. St George is one of the finest hookers in the game in Auckland”. A week later it was confirmed that he would indeed return in the round 5 match against Richmond Rovers. The Sun said “with its last season’s hooker, St George, back in the fold, Shore will probably see more of the ball in the scrum downs than Richmond…”. Devonport won 15 to 7, and then in a 24 to 9 win the following week against Newton “St George gave his side a good share of the ball”. His third game of the season was significant in that it was his 100th first grade match for Devonport. A feat achieved by relatively few players in Auckland club rugby league. The match was drawn 13–13 with the Sun reporting that "St George was also in the limelight a good deal, although in the scrums he was not seeing so very much of the ball against the Marists hooker Campbell".

St George ultimately played in 13 games for Devonport but was not selected for any representative matches.

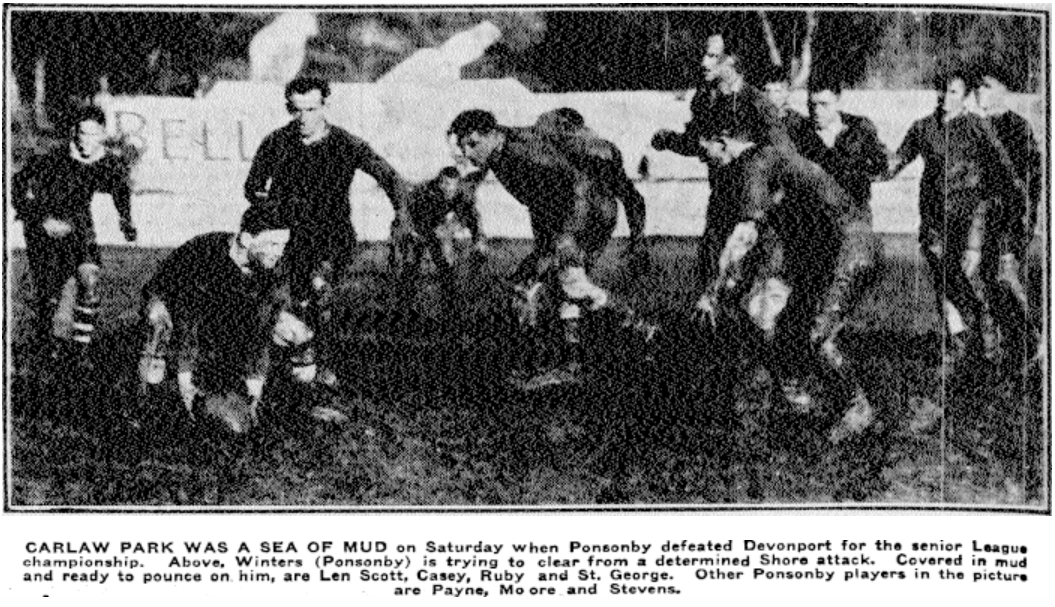

He had turned 32 in July and was now in the later stages of his career. Devonport finished runner up to Ponsonby in the 1st grade championship with an 11 win, 1 draw, 3 loss record. The two teams had been tied after round 14 and a playoff for the title was required with Ponsonby winning 5–0 before a crowd of 11,000. Alf Scott and Syd Rule were said to be Devonport's best forwards but were “well supported by St George and Dixon”. His last match of the season was against Huntly in Huntly on 14 September. He was up against Bob Stephenson, the man he had replaced the previous season in the Auckland Provincial side which played England. The Sun reported that “hooking honours were fairly even. St George had nothing on Stephenson, who is noted for his tenacity in sticking to the ball”.

=== Retirement and matches against his brother ===
The 1930 season was to be St George's last playing. He turned out in 13 matches for Devonport after speculation at the start of the season that he may be retiring. The NZ Truth reported that “St George is an unlikely starter”. In the meantime his younger brother Allen Alfred St George, better known as Ed, made his debut for Newton Rangers. He was also a hooker and was said to have played a “good game”.

Neville St George's first match came in round 4 against Ellerslie at the Devonport Domain with Ellerslie upsetting the home side 13–5. A week later he “hooked well” in their loss to City and “had things all his own way in the scrum” with City's representative hooker out. He was singled out by the newspapers in several matches and then on 5 July he came up against his brother for the first time when Devonport met Newton at Carlaw Park in the main match. Devonport won the match 5 points to 0. Neville played well while the Auckland Star said “another St George was one of the shining lights in the Newton pack”. The older St George's only points of the season came in round 10 against Richmond. He scored a try under the posts after securing the ball from “a scrimmage on the Richmond line” to give his side an 11–7 lead but they were defeated 14–13. The following round Devonport travelled to the Ellerslie Racecourse to meat the local side and won 12–8. Despite having recently turned 33 he was said to be “outstanding”. In a heavy loss to Ponsonby on 30 August the Star said that he “worked with a will” while the Herald said that he “stood out as the best forward on the ground”. The Sun said that he “played one of his best games of this season”.

Then on 6 September he played against his brother once more when Devonport met Newton in a first round Roope Rooster match. It was reported that “Nev. St George won a fair number of scrums for Devonport and was conspicuous in the heavy going throughout”, while ‘St George junior compared well with his brother, getting the ball in the scrums”. The Sun said “St George, hooking in the black scrum, beat the Newton man almost every time”. Neville played in 2 more matches for Devonport, against Ponsonby on 13 September, and then City on 27 September. This match was a play in game to make the Stormont Shield final. It appears that this was his final match and that he did not play in the Stormont Shield final on 4 October, which Devonport won 17–5. St George required from the game after 12 seasons in senior rugby league.

== Personal life ==
Neville St George spent much of his life living in the Devonport suburb where his rugby league side was based. In 1925 he was living at 24 Bond Street, Devonport and was an engineer by trade. After retiring it appears that he moved to the Papatoetoe area in South Auckland and became involved with the Papatoetoe rugby league club, being listed as their auditor after their annual general meeting in 1931. It appears he may have held this position as early as 1927.

Neville was a member of the Grand Lodge of England Freemasons with his name appearing on their register in 1920, with his father Robert also a member.

Neville married Ada May Waymouth in 1920 on 14 April. They were married at St. James Manse. In the marriage notice in the Auckland Star it was said that his father was living in Mangere at the time, and that his wife Ada was the second daughter of Mr. H.R. Waymouth of Devonport.

Neville appears to have reverted his name back to Robert Neville St George at some point in his life, as many records have it listed this way and his gravestone is also written this way. It appears as though the couple did not have any children.

According to census and electoral roll records the couple lived in Papatoetoe throughout the 1940s and St George continued to work as an engineer and ironically the street they lived on in Papatoetoe was St George Street where they lived at 86. His father, Robert Montgomery St George died on 27 January 1946 in Otahuhu, Auckland. By 1954 Neville and Ada had moved to 114 St George Street in Papatoetoe where they still lived up until at least 1969 according to electoral records.

His wife Ada died on 4 December 1978 in Takapuna, Auckland. Neville died two years later on 27 October 1980 in Auckland. He was buried at O'Neill's Point Cemetery in Belmont, Auckland in the same grave site as his wife.
