= Ed St George =

New Zealand international rugby league player

Personal information
- Full name: Allen Alfred St George
- Born: 24 April 1910 New Zealand
- Died: 30 June 1949 (aged 39) Beecroft, New South Wales, Australia

Playing information
- Height: 5 ft 9 in (1.75 m)
- Position: Hooker
Club
Years	Team	Pld	T	G	FG	P
1930–33	Newton Rangers	33	8	1	0	26
Representative
Years	Team	Pld	T	G	FG	P
1931	Auckland	1	0	0	0	0
1931	Auckland Colts	1	0	0	0	0
1932	Auckland trial	2	1	0	0	3
1932	New Zealand	1	0	0	0	0
- As of 26 April 2023
- Relatives: Neville St George (brother)

Allen Alfred "Ed" St George (24 April 1910 – 30 June 1949) was a rugby league player who represented New Zealand in 1932 in one Test match against England. He played club rugby league for the Newton Rangers in the Auckland Rugby League competition. His position was hooker.

St George was assigned cap number 220a by New Zealand Rugby League. He debuted alongside Jonas Masters, who was assigned number 220, but due to an error made while compiling their player records, St George was mistaken for his older brother Neville, who had played in the same position for New Zealand in 1925, and was therefore omitted from the records until the correction was made.

On 30 June 1949, St George murdered his estranged wife Daphne Sylvester St George (née Crawford) in her Sydney home and then killed himself.

== Early life ==
Allen Alfred St George was born on 24 April 1910. His father was Robert Montgomery St George (1874–1946) and his mother was Lillian Neville St George (c.1874–1916). Ed was the youngest of six children, his older siblings being: the eldest was born in 1886 and was unnamed in the New Zealand Births, Deaths and Marriages records, followed by Neville St George (b.1897), Stewart Lyell (b.1899), Lillian Edith Melba (b.1903), Laurel Margaret (b.1906), Ella Mavis (b.1908). After his mother's death in 1916, his father Robert remarried to Fanny Jewell Huxtable in 1919. Ed's brother Neville also represented New Zealand at rugby league and the brothers would oppose each other in the hooking position in two matches in club rugby league in 1930 in Neville's final season.

== Playing career ==
=== Junior rugby league and rugby union ===
It appears that St George was playing for one of the Ellerslie United club teams in the Sixth grade of the Auckland Rugby League junior competitions in 1925. By 1926 he had moved up to the fifth grade at the start of the season. However, he was then listed in the Manukau Rovers rugby fourth grade side by midseason. Then in 1927, he progressed to their third grade team. He was being listed in the front row. There was however no mention of him in the newspapers again until 1930 until he reappeared in the Manukau Rovers senior B side to start the season.

=== Newton Rangers 1930 debut season ===
Newton began their 1930 season on April 26 against Devonport United, Ed's brother, Neville's side. Ed was not playing being listed in their side at this point as he was still being named to play for the Manukau Rovers senior B rugby union side. He does not appear to have played in their round 2 match against City Rovers but made his debut for Newton on May 10 at the Auckland Domain. Newton won the match 14–8 with St George scoring a try. In the team was former Manukau Rovers senior player Cyril Brimble. His brother, Ted Brimble, also a player at Manukau rugby would join the Newton side also in June. Ed was said to have played a “good game” along with Ray Middleton and Allen. His try came at the start of the second half when the scorers were 8-8. Newton got an attacking scrum and following a melee “St George scored under the posts”. The Auckland Star said he was “prominent” along with Middleton. He next played in a match against Ponsonby United on May 24. Newton lost 14–10 on Carlaw Park number 2 field. With Newton leading 10-9 “St George appeared to score at the end of a Newton onslaught, but was brought back for a scrum”. The Star commented that “St. George and Francis, and to a lesser extent, Kirkup, Allan, and Butler, were keen and active forwards”. The Sun newspaper said that of the Newton forwards “St George, perhaps, was outstanding”. Following an 11–3 win over Richmond Rovers on June 7 he scored his second try in a 21–10 loss to Marist Old Boys on June 21 in the main match on Carlaw Park #1. His try came after Ted Brimble (future, New Zealand international) in his debut game of rugby league) got the ball from a short drop out by Charles Gregory and “paved the way for St George to score under the posts” after he beat Norman Drew and passed the ball. He was said to be one of “the most outstanding Newton forward’s” along with Kirkup, Middleton, and Ferguson. Following a June 28 win over Ellerslie Newton met Devonport United. This saw Ed come literally face to face with his brother Neville as they were both hookers on opposing sides and would have been directly packing down and contesting the ball in the scrums. The Devonport side won 5–0 with the Auckland Star reporting that Neville had a good game for them while “another St George was one of the shining lights in the Newton pack”. The New Zealand Herald said that he and Kirkup “were most prominent”.

In a 21–8 loss to City Rovers on July 12 in round 9 he was said to have worked hard. Then in a surprise 13–5 loss to Kingsland Athletic he set up a try after “eluding [Claude] List transferred to [Ray] Middleton, who dived over just outside the posts”. The Star went on to say that he was “the head of affairs” in their forward pack. The Sun said that he and Middleton were “continually in the picture”. The following week in round 11 he scored his third try of the season in an 18–7 loss to Ponsonby at Carlaw Park. He scored “under the posts” after some hard work by Newton to make the score 8–3 to Ponsonby. Francis was said to be their best forward with Mollett and St George “about the best of the remainder”. In an 11–3 win over Richmond he “played well among the Newton forwards in the loose, but Richmond had an advantage in the scrum work”. After a 16–16 draw with Marist, Newton faced Devonport once again. It was the first round of the Roope Rooster knockout competition and was ultimately Newton's final match of the season as they lost 15-2 and were eliminated from the competition. The Auckland Star said that “St George junior compared well with his brother, getting the ball in the scrums”. Though they had earlier said that his brother Neville had done the same and The Sun wrote that Neville “hooking in the black scrum, beat the Newton man almost every time”, though they did say that Ed was one of the best Newton forwards along with Mollett and Francis.

=== 1931 Newton, Auckland and Auckland Colts ===
St George's first game for Newton in the 1931 season was against the combined Ellerslie-Ōtāhuhu side on May 2. The match was drawn 5–5 at the Ellerslie Reserve with St George in the hooker position. His brother Neville had retired at the end of the 1930 season. It was said that Stanley Francis was the stand out forward for Newton and “his associates. Particularly St. George, were always battles, and the hooking was first class”. He played in matches against Devonport, Richmond Rovers, Ponsonby, and Marist though was not mentioned in any match reports. In round 6 Newton played against City on a very muddy Western Springs ground and drew 0-0. St George was said to be “prominent” along with some other Newton forwards and “worked well”. In round 8 on June 27 he scored 2 tries in a 14–3 win over the Ellerslie-Ōtāhuhu side at Carlaw Park. The Auckland Star said that he “showed to advantage on several occasions with a good run with the ball at toe”. While the Herald said “St. George ably led the Newton forwards. He was a tireless worker, particularly in the loose, and he gave the backs excellent support”. His first try came when the “Newton forwards swept over the opposition and St George scored a nice try” while his second came late in the first half when Newton had been “superior in the loose and [he] broke through and scored”.

Their next match was against his brother's old side, Devonport at the Devonport Domain on July 4. Devonport won 20 points to 5 with the Auckland Star saying that “St George again upheld the family name as a good rake”. Then in a 17–9 loss to Marist on July 11 he and some other Newton forwards “were ever in the fray” and he along with the others were “sound on both defence and attack”. Against Ponsonby at Stafford Park in Northcote, Newton were defeated 12–7. It was said that there “was not much between him” and his Ponsonby opposite, Stevens. He combined in a break with halfback Porteous, before Pope sent Hill over for a try in the first half. In an 8–0 loss to Richmond at Carlaw Park he was “good in the pack” along with Kirkup and Emanuel. While the Herald described his forward play as “excellent” along with Ferguson. Against City in round 13 he scored two more tries in a 23–10 win. He set up their first try as well after a “nice run” before Ferguson scored. His first try came in the second half after he supported Hill who passed to him and he scored between the posts to make the score 16–10. Then from “another sweeping offensive” he scored again. The Herald said that St George was “outstanding”. On August 9 Newton travelled to Hamilton to play the local side at Hinemoa Park. Newton won 28–6 with St George passing to Ted Brimble who scored to give them a 16–0 lead.

==== Auckland selection ====
Newton played two more matches against Hamilton on August 22 and then Devonport on August 28. Against Hamilton at Carlaw Park Newton won 8 to 5 with St George kicking a penalty. The later match was a loss in the Roope Rooster competition and saw their season end. St George was then chosen in a 20-man practice squad for Auckland who were preparing for a match against Northland on September 26 at Carlaw Park. He was then named in the reserves a day before the match. However, on the day of the match he was named to start in place of Gordon Campbell. With Auckland trailing 5-3 he led the Auckland forwards along with Stan Clark and Dick Smith picked up the ball and passed to Pat Meehan who scored. The match eventually ended in a 19–19 draw.

Then at the start of October, St George was chosen to go into training for an Auckland Colts squad of 24 players to prepare to play against the touring Eastern Suburbs side from Sydney which was touring the northern part of New Zealand. He was ultimately chosen to play at hooker with Heck Lunn and Hugh Simpson in the prop positions. The Colts side lost the match 18–13 at Carlaw Park on October 21.

=== 1932 Newton and New Zealand selection ===
The 1932 season saw St George playing for Newton Rangers once more. His first match was against City on April 30. Newton won 18–5 at the Auckland Domain. Late in the match he made “a good dash” which “was finished off by [Charles] Allen”. In their 8–8 draw with Devonport in round 3 on May 21 he was said to be “full of pep” along with the rest of the forwards and he, Trevor Hall, and Ray Middleton “commanded much admiration”. In the first half he “initiated a clever movement and sent [Ted] Brimble over for a try under the posts. They lost to Marist 13-10 in round 5 with the Auckland Star saying St George, Hall, and Kirkup “had a great trio”. The Herald made similar remarks stating “the Newton forwards all worked hard, Hall, St George, Allen and Kirkup being the most prominent”. He was “prominent” again in Newton's 13–13 draw with City on June 4.

After 3 more matches for Newton, St George was named at hooker for a trial match at Carlaw Park. The England rugby league team was touring New Zealand later in the year and so a series of representative matches and trials were planned. Auckland were playing South Auckland on July 16 with a trial amongst the best other Auckland players as curtain-raiser. St George was chosen in the Probables side at hooker, matching up with Stevens from Ponsonby in the Possibles side. Gordon Campbell had been selected to hook for the Auckland side in their representative fixture. The Probables side won the game by 26 points to 12. A week later on July 23 another Auckland trial was held, this time as curtain-raiser to the North Island – South Island inter-island match at Carlaw Park. R. Stephenson of the South Auckland (Waikato) league had been selected at hooker for the North Island while St George was playing for the Possibles side opposite Gordon Campbell in the Probables. His Possibles side won easily by 37 points to 16 with St George scoring a first half try after good play by Crook.

==== New Zealand selection ====
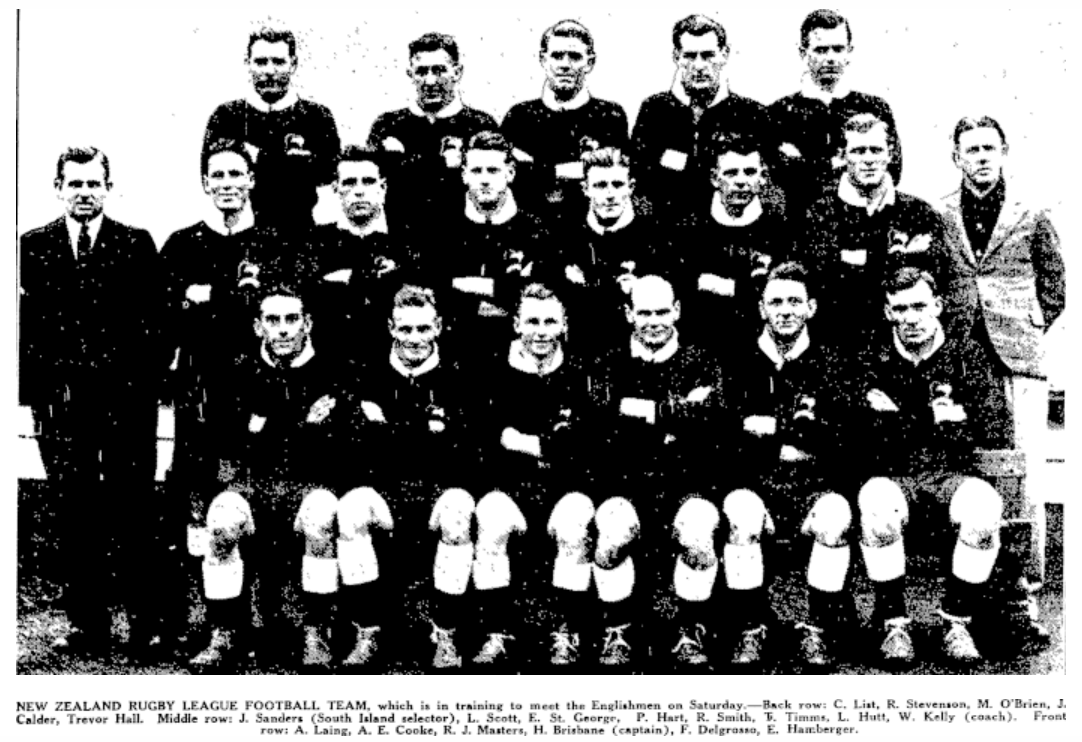

Following the inter-island and trial matches St George was a surprise selection for New Zealand to play England in the first test at Carlaw Park on July 30. The New Zealand Herald said that “there are some surprises in the selection, chief among these being the inclusion of St George as hooker. The Newton forward, while being good in the loose, has not been so successful as other hookers in club football. Stephenson hooked for the North Island team and the selectors have now placed him as a front row forward”. The selectors, [Scotty] McClymont, A Ferguson, and J Sanders had chosen St George to play between props Jim Calder and Bob Stephenson who had both debuted for New Zealand in 1930. The Auckland Star wrote “four very young players who will be wearing the All Black [rugby league] jersey for the first time are [Albert] Laing, [Peter] Hart (who has just turned 18 years of age), [Jonas] Masters and St George. The last mentioned, a member of the Newton Rangers club and brother of Neville St George, the well-known Devonport and Auckland hooker a few years ago, had not played for the North Island, in which Laing made his first appearance at the week-end”. They went on to also comment that “the front row men should go down in well-balanced style. With Calder and Stephenson, North Island and “Kiwi” hookers, to aid him, St George should have a fair chance to rake the ball successfully. The new hooker is a rugged sort and brilliant in the loose where he runs and handles like a back”.

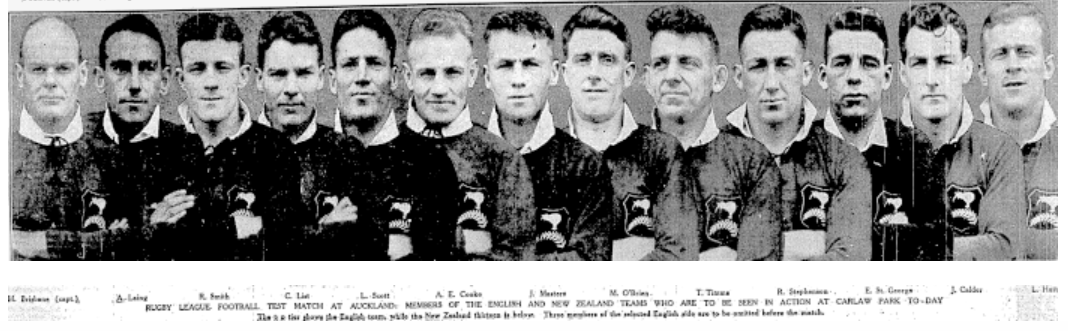

England won the match at Carlaw park on July 30 easily by 24 points to 9 before a crowd of 25,000. St George was hooking against John Lowe and was completely outplayed in that department. The Auckland Star said “a great deal of responsibility fell on St George, the New Zealand rake. On the day he was outclassed” though they also noted that as well as hooking, New Zealand also fell short at full back, both wingers, and lock. In the Auckland Star commenting on the match later on “Bunty” said “the worst feature of St George’s failure to rake the ball, was his persistence in putting his leg out across the tunnel. The visiting half [Bryn Evans] shrewdly threw the ball against that offending leg so that it quickly rebounded in favour of the Englishmen, who were given the benefit of the advantage rule. This prevented the holding up of play for penalties against St George. When the latter happened to hook the ball, Masters, except on two or three occasions in the first half, seemed to be all at sea”.

When the Auckland team was selected to play the England side, Gordon Campbell was preferred at hooker. It was also speculated, prior to the second test side being named that “it is possible that Stephenson may be the hooker instead of St George”. While the same article went on to say that “St George cannot be solely blamed for being beaten by Lowe, who was in front of a powerful vanguard” which collectively weighed over 5 stone more than the New Zealand forwards. St George was eventually named as Auckland's single forward reserve for the match against the tourists on August 5. England won the match 19–14 with the Herald stating that “Campbell was far more successful in getting the ball from the scrums that St George in the test match. England gained possession on 34 occasions and Auckland 29 times”. Unsurprisingly Campbell was chosen at hooker for the second test.

St George then returned to his Newton club side in a 10–6 loss. He scored one of their two tries and he and Johnson “battled about even as hookers”. His try came after he showed “clever anticipation” and had Norm Campbell bustled, and from desperate rucking on the line St George dived over”. In his final game of the season he was sent off in a 36-10 Roope Rooster round 1 loss to Ponsonby. For Ponsonby Heck Lunn, and Stevens were sent off along with St George. Lunn had been sent off for punching, while a short time later St George and Stevens, who were the opposing hookers “staged an impromptu wrestling bout, and were sent off by the referee”. Earlier in the match St George had intercepted a pass and make a “swerving run” before he passed to Emanuel who scored”. Following the match the two Ponsonby players appeared before the board to explain their conduct. They said “the game was hard and hotly contested in the rucks and regretted what had occurred”. The referee's report was considered and they decided to administer a “severe caution” while “St George was suspended until he appears before the league”.

=== 1933 Final season ===
At the beginning of the 1933 season his suspension was lifted by the Auckland Rugby League after it had been “dealt with at the end of last season”. He played in their first round match against Richmond which they won 25–11 on April 29. Then a week later they won again, 16–12 over City with the Auckland Star writing that “St George again proved his ability as a hooker”. They then won their third consecutive game to start the season, 11–8 against Devonport with St George “outstanding in the vanguard” along with Nathan and Hall. Newton then lost their next three matches to Marist, Ponsonby, and Richmond. In the May 27 match against Ponsonby there was friction between St George and Stevens, the player he had been sent off for fighting with previously, and both forward packs in general. Early in the match referee Percy Rogers made a highly unusual decision to replace both hookers with Fagan taking over from Stevens and S. Quirke replacing St George. However even that did not solve the issue between them and a while later Nathan from the Newton side was sent off.

St George was listed to play in one more match, against City on June 17 and was then not mentioned again in either team listings or match reports. He moved to Australia later in the year and there is no record of him playing the sport in Australia.

== Personal life ==
Ed St George had several issues with the law during his life until his death. In 1927, aged 17 he was fined £3 for failing to attend drill in connection with military service. Earlier in the year he was found to have defaulted on a fine and costs. Then on February 9, 1931, he “was fined £10 for unlawfully converting to his own use a motor cycle valued at £40 belonging to E. A. Aldred” at the Onehunga Court. The Police Gazette in their records stated that he was a labourer, and was 5 foot 9 with a pale complexion, black hair, brown eyes, and had a broken nose.

=== Australia ===
He departed for Sydney, Australia on board the Wanganella Ship on August 3 from Wellington, arriving in Sydney on August 7. In 1935 there was a brief report in the New Zealand Police Gazette that St George had breached the Unemployment Act however a later note mentioned that there was to be no further action taken after he had been interviewed in early 1948. The report mentioned that he was an engineer's fitter “strong build, light brown hair inclined to be curly, with blue eyes”. In the same year a notice appeared in several Australian papers seeking his whereabouts. It stated "Estate: William H. Neville, Allen Alfred St George, previously of New Zealand and Sydney; will he or anyone knowing his present whereabouts please communicate with the Public Curator, Brisbane". In 1936 his name appeared in the Australian Electoral Rolls. He was living in the suburb of Woree in Cairns, Queensland working as a cane cutter. Then in the 1937 Supplemental Electoral Roll he was listed as living at Kidston, Eainasleigh in Queensland, and working as a gold miner.

=== World War 2 ===
St George voluntarily enlisted in the World War 2 effort on 18 June 1940. He was living at Tennant Creek in the Northern Territory at the time. His service number was DX578, and he served in the army as part of the Second Australian Imperial Force.

=== Marriage ===
In 1945, St George married Daphne Sylvester Crawford in Sydney, New South Wales. She was aged 29, with St George aged 35. She was a New Zealander by birth, having been born on 13 July 1915, but was also living in Australia.

=== Murder-suicide ===
In 1949, Ed St George was living in Darlinghurst, New South Wales, at 24 Craigend Street, working as an engineer. At some point in the late 1940s St George and his wife Daphne separated. She then lived in a house in Northern Sydney owned by her parents, while they lived next door. On Thursday, 30 June 1949, Ed St George went to her parents' house and then her house before murdering Daphne, and then moments later shooting himself dead. The Sun (Sydney) reported that their bodies were found in “a room of a house in Railway Parade, Beecroft. A sawn-off .22-calibre rifle was near the man’s body. Charles Silvester Crawford, father of the dead woman said his daughter had been estranged from her husband a New Zealander. St George had assaulted him and Mrs. Crawford, and had threatened to blow their brains out, Crawford said. Crawford described how St George had dragged Mrs. St George into the bedroom and called out: “Come and see me shoot your daughter”. Mrs. Crawford said that her daughter had called out: “Don’t come in, Mum. He has a gun”. It was reported that fourteen months prior to the murder-suicide St George had come “home, knocked down his father-in-law, who is about 65 years old, and injured Mrs. Crawford’s hand by jamming it in a door”. Then on the night of the murder the parents chased “their son-in-law in an attempt to save their daughter’s life”. Daphne was killed instantly after being shot, while St George died a few minutes after shooting himself. The former couple were childless.

Ed St George was buried at Rookwood General Cemetery in New South Wales on 5 July 1949.
