= Jim O'Brien (rugby league, born 1896) =

New Zealand international rugby player (1896–1988)

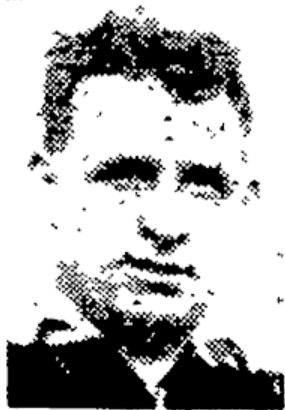

Personal information
- Full name: James Lawrence O'Brien
- Born: 2 August 1896 Stillwater, New Zealand
- Died: 6 April 1988 (aged 91) North Shore, Auckland, New Zealand

Playing information
- Height: 5 ft 8 in (1.73 m)
- Weight: 13 st 11 lb (88 kg)
- Position: Second-row, Prop
Club
Years	Team	Pld	T	G	FG	P
1920–21	Maritime/Athletic	14	2	0	0	6
1921–28	Devonport United	73	18	0	0	54
	Total	87	20	0	0	60
Representative
Years	Team	Pld	T	G	FG	P
1922–27	Auckland	20	9	0	0	27
1923	Auckland City	1	1	0	0	3
1924	Auckland B	1	0	0	0	0
1925	New Zealand	1	0	0	0	0
1925–26	Auckland Trial	2	0	0	0	0
1926	New Zealand Trial	1	0	0	0	0
1927	North Island	1	0	0	0	0

Coaching information
Club
Years	Team	Gms	W	D	L	W%
1931	Devonport United	17	14	0	3	82

James Lawrence O'Brien (2 August 1896 – 6 April 1988) was a New Zealand rugby league player. He represented the New Zealand rugby league team in 1 match in 1925 against Queensland. In the process he became the 182nd player to represent New Zealand. He also represented Auckland 20 times from 1922 to 1927, and the North Island side in 1927. He played his club rugby league in Auckland for the North Shore Albions (who at this time were named Devonport United) from 1921 to 1928, captaining them at times later in his career. He played for the Maritime club in 1920 and 1921 in his early years after returning from World War 1.

== Early life ==
James (Jim) Lawrence O'Brien was born on 2 August 1896, in Stillwater, Grey, on the West Coast of the South Island of New Zealand. His parents were Catherine (Kate) O'Brien (née Hughes) (1856–1908), and James O'Brien (1859–1927). Kate was born in Kilmore, Dublin, Ireland, while James was born in Tipperary, Ireland. He had 4 sisters; Elizabeth Mary O'Brien (1887–?), Johanna Theresa O'Brien (1890–?), Margaret O'Brien (1891–?), and Mary Kathleen O'Brien (1894), and 2 brothers; John Terence O'Brien (1897–1975), and Patrick William O'Brien (1900–1983). His mother died in 1908 in Stillwater aged 52 when Jim was 12 years old. His father died in 1927 in Brunner, West Coast aged 68.

== World War 1 ==
In 1915, O'Brien enlisted in the World War 1 effort. It appears as though he falsified his age as he was only turning 19 in this year which was too young to be eligible. On his enlistment papers it was stated that his date of birth was 2 August 1894. At the time he was a sheep farmer and living at "Sea Homestead". His fathers address was the Liverpool Collieries, Rewanui, on the West Coast. It was the Liverpool State Coalmine which had opened in 1889 and was closed in 1994. His sister, Mrs. H. Day, was listed as his next of kin and was living at 17 Milton Street in Nelson.

=== Distinguished Conduct Medal ===
He commenced duties on 13 December 1915. O'Brien was part of the 11th Reinforcements in J Company as a Private but was later promoted to Sergeant serving in the Auckland Infantry Regiment in the 2nd battalion. He fought in Egypt in 1916 and Western Europe in 1916–18. O'Brien was awarded the Distinguished Conduct Medal. In the London Gazette on 30 May 1919, it was written that it was awarded "for conspicuous gallantry and devotion to duty. He has fought in every action but one in which the battalion has been engaged. He distinguished himself at Grevillers and Bancourt in August, 1918, by the cool handling of his section and his gallantry under heavy fire. One 10th October, in the advance of the River Selle, he was again noticed for his excellent work". He served overseas for 3 years and 60 days with his total service 3 years and 179 days. He was also awarded the British War Medal, and Victory Medal. In an extract from the fifth supplement to the London Gazette on the same date it was also stated that "His Majesty the King has been graciously pleased to approve of the award of the Distinguished Conduct Medal to the undermentioned Non-Commissioned Officer for gallantry and distinguished service in the field ... 10250 Sergt. J.L. O'Brien, Auck. Inf. Battln.".

After the war he was due to arrive back into Wellington, New Zealand on 27 May 1919 on the troopship S.S. Pakeha, but ultimately arrived on 30 May. He was discharged on 27 June 1919. After returning to New Zealand he moved to Auckland and took up residence at 12 Rutland Rd, in Devonport, on the North Shore of Auckland.

== Playing career ==
=== Rugby league for Maritime ===
Jim O'Brien began his rugby league career playing for the Maritime club in Auckland Rugby League in 1920. His debut was on 17 April against Otahuhu Rovers in a practice match. He did not play in their opening game on 8 May but made his first appearance in an official competition match a week later against Marist Old Boys at Victoria Park. They won 16 to 11 and the Auckland Star said "Arndt, Herring and O'Brien did good work for the pack". He played in 8 further matches before scoring his first try. Maritime had "worked the ball to the City line, where from a scrum O'Brien obtained possession and struggled over the line" to give Maritime a 15–8 lead with them holding on to win 15–11. The following week they defeated Ponsonby United to win the championship. It is unclear if he played in Maritime's remaining 4 matches but it is likely that he played in at least 3 of them.

=== Transfer to Devonport United ===
In 1921, O'Brien was elected on to the Maritime committee. He only played in 3 matches for Maritime out of their first 5, not being selected to start in games against Newton Rangers on 14 May, or Ponsonby United on 28 May.

On 25 June, O'Brien was surprisingly listed in the Devonport United squad for their match against Newton. There had been no reports in any of the newspapers of his transfer which was normally the case. The match was postponed. He made his senior debut for Devonport United on 2 July in a loss to Ponsonby 18–11. It was then reported that he was being "reinstated as a member of the North Shore club" implying that he had played there initially after returning from the war, most likely in a junior side.

In 1923 O'Brien began the season in Devonport's second grade team with his brother Terence playing in their 3rd grade side. Teams were typically listed in the Friday edition of the Auckland newspapers in their approximate playing order with the first thirteen named being the starting side. O'Brien was listed from 14 to 18 most weeks and was not mentioned in any match reports so it is unlikely he played until their round 10 match on 15 July when they defeated Fire Brigade 21–7. He was named in a match report as playing a "great game" along with Alf Scott, Harry Douglas, Neville St George, and Wheeler. O'Brien was involved in a try on 5 August against Athletic in an 11–9 loss. It is possible that he played in additional matches though he was not named in any other match reports.

=== Auckland debut ===
At the end of the 1922 season Auckland traveled to Bay Of Plenty to play the fledgling Bay of Plenty side that George Iles had been instrumental in starting. O'Brien was chosen in the second row alongside W Hanlon, with Devonport teammate Harry Douglas at lock. Early in the match when Australian boxer Mike Flynn had made a break "Somers and O'Brien further improved, and Johnson joining issue the last mentioned swept over to open the visitors' score". Auckland went on to win the match by 33 points to 26 at the Tauranga Domain.

O'Brien became established in the Devonport side in 1923 when he played in 12 matches and scored 3 tries. After their first match with Athletic on 5 May the New Zealand Herald said that "O'Brien and St George were very busy among the forwards". In round 4 he scored a "fine try" in a 12–3 win over Richmond Rovers at the Devonport Domain. He "secured from the loose and scored a brilliant try". In their round 6 loss to Ponsonby United he was "the pick of the forwards" along with Johnston and Harry Douglas. He scored a week later in another loss, this time to Marist Old Boys by 18–13 at the Devonport Domain. His try came after he "made the best of an opportunity and dribbled over, falling on the ball, giving Devonport their initial try". He "shone in the attacking" along with St George and Douglas. He "showed up well" in the forwards in 14–8 loss to Athletic at Carlaw Park on 30 June. The following week against City Rovers he scored a try in a 13–10 win when he followed a break by Garrett and "took the ball on [and] beat the opposition, and scored between the posts". He was again "the pick of the forwards" with Douglas and Johnstone where they were "prominent in all the good work". He played in a match with Richmond before not being listed in the side in their round 11 and 12 matches before returning for round 14. In their round 1 Roope Rooster final win over Athletic by 21 to 16 he was "frequently prominent". His club season finished a week later in a Roope Rooster semi-final loss to City Rovers.

O'Brien's good form was rewarded when he was selected for Auckland in their match against Hamilton on 12 September at Carlaw Park. He was chosen at prop however there were several changes made to the side on the day of the match and he did not play. He was picked again for Auckland's match against an Auckland Province side on 29 September. He was named in the second row with Hec McDonald, while Nelson Bass was at lock. The Auckland City side won by 44 points to 15 before 7,000 spectators at Carlaw Park. He was involved in Hec McDonald's try after toeing the ball through the Province sides defence. He took the ball and passed to McDonald who scored in the corner. O'Brien later scored a try when Clarrie Polson "got the ball and sent it to O'Brien, who transferred to Dufty, and when being crowded out he sent a long pass to O'Brien, who gathered in to score". The Auckland Star said afterwards that McDonald was easily the best forward and "he received solid support from Stack and O'Brien". O'Brien was then selected for Auckland's next match against South Auckland (Waikato) which was their final game of the season. The match was played once again at Carlaw Park and saw Auckland win 35–11 before a crowd of 6,000. Early in the second half with Auckland trailing 7–8 "Thomas and O'Brien made an attack but lost the ball when within an ace of scoring".

In 1924, O'Brien played 15 matches for Devonport and once again played 2 games for Auckland. Interestingly former All Black Andrew O'Brien switched codes and joined the Marist Old Boys rugby league club. He also went by the name Jim O'Brien which caused some confusion at times as to which player was being named in newspaper reports as they also both played prop and would be regularly selected for Auckland and later the New Zealand side.

In Devonport's second match on 10 May "O'Brien, who had been playing well, distinguished himself by tackling Mike Flynn, who was making a good run with the ball" with the match finishing a 2–2 draw. The following round he had a try disallowed in a 13–7 win over Richmond on 24 May. After round 5 on 31 May he was selected in a 22-man Auckland squad to prepare for the touring Australian University side. With the first match scheduled for midweek on 4 June. O'Brien was not selected for the starting side with Auckland winning the match 15 to 7. He was again left out of the starting side initially for the second match 3 days later on 7 June but was then brought into the side to replace Bill Stormont due to injury. Stormont would tragically die a year later from rheumatic heart disease. Auckland won the second match 17 to 2 before 4,000 spectators with the two Jim O'Brien's propping the scrum and Alf Townsend at hooker. Jim O'Brien (Devonport) was involved in the lead up to the first try to Ben Davidson. He was named to start again in an unchanged front row for the third match on 14 June. The match was drawn 14–14 before 12,000 spectators. O'Brien was involved in Auckland's first try when Craddock Dufty made a good run before "he handed on to O'Brien [who] transferred to Douglas, who dashed over and scored a fine try". The Auckland Star said that Hec McDonald was the best forward on the ground, "and of the others O'Brien (Devonport) played a great game".

Back playing for Devonport he scored a try in a 16–15 win over Athletic. Of the Devonport forwards he "showed up the most". Then in a 24–3 win over Mangere he and Harry Douglas "were the best of the forwards". On 12 July Devonport were playing their rivals for the championship, Marist, and were thrashed 37–0 before 10,000 at Carlaw Park. The backs drew most of the criticism and Douglas, O'Brien, and Alf Scott were mentioned as being the "only ones to display their best form" in the losing side. He was then selected to play for Auckland B against Hamilton in a midweek match on 16 July. Auckland B won 28 to 18 in a side which still featured 9 current or future New Zealand representatives.

Devonport continued their good run of form and after a loss to Ponsonby in round 10 they won against Ellerslie, Newton, and Mangere United with O'Brien involved in a try to Tommy Taylor in the later match which was played on Victoria Park. It was said that "O'Brien and St George were always to the fore in the forward movements". After the win Devonport led the championship with 19 competition points with Marist 2 behind on 17. They then lost a match to City Rovers before beating Marist and Athletic. This meant that Devonport had an 11–1–3 record through 16 rounds and Marist had a 10–1–3 record at the same time but had played one fewer match. The Auckland Rugby League decided to have the two sides play-off for the championship on 27 September. The match was played in front of an enormous club record crowd of 17,000 at Carlaw Park. Devonport were defeated 20–17 with Marist scoring a try in the last minute. O'Brien had had to leave the field with an injured shoulder early in the match with the score 5–2 to Marist. Marist also debuted Jack Kirwan, whose grandson John Kirwan would one day represent New Zealand at rugby union.

=== New Zealand selection ===
The 1925 season saw O'Brien play 13 matches for Devonport and score 5 tries, a career high for him. He also played in 5 matches for Auckland and made his only appearance for New Zealand against Queensland.

In Devonport's opening round win over Richmond on 18 April by 29 points to 9, O'Brien passed to Allan Seagar who scored. Against Marist in a round 2 loss the Herald said "[Norman] Veart, O'Brien, and [Horace] Dixon were the best of an even pack". In round 4 Devonport was thrashed by Ponsonby 40–5, with O'Brien scoring their only try after a break by Horace Dixon saw him pass to O'Brien on the try line. It was said that aside from Dixon, "O'Brien and [Norm] Veart worked very hard". Then in their following match, another loss, this time to Athletic 8–6, "O'Brien and Veart played a hard ruck game, keeping the ball at their feet". He scored a try in their 29–11 win over Newton at the Devonport Domain on 30 May. After Alf Scott made a break he passed to Greig who passed "to O'Brien who eluded his opponents and scored" to give Devonport a 19–11 lead. He scored again a week later against City taking a pass from Stan Webb. Tom Haddon and Horace Dixon had been involved in the lead up toeing the ball ahead before Stan Webb had picked it up and handed it off to O'Brien "who raced over to score". The Herald said after the match that "J. O'Brien was the best of the Devonport forwards. He played very ably, handling well and running strongly". Then two weeks later on 20 June Devonport beat Marist 19–11 with O'Brien scoring once more. Marist tried a relieving kick through Charles Gregory near their line which was charged down with "the ball going over the line, O'Brien diving for it" and scoring. The Auckland Star wrote of the Devonport forwards that they "worked hard all the time, particularly O'Brien, who is one of the best in Auckland". While the New Zealand Herald said "he showed up best with the ball at toe and worked very hard in the scrums".

O'Brien's form saw him chosen in an Auckland trial match in the B team along with Wally Somers and hooker and John Stormont at prop just 16 days after the death of his brother Bill. The match was played as curtain raiser to the inter-island match between the North Island and the South Island. O'Brien's B team won the match 5–0 with their try coming after he "kicked hard over the A team's line" following a scrum and J. Payne followed up to score. A third match was also played between an Auckland side and South Auckland and the New Zealand selectors chose the touring squad for Australia with O'Brien missing selection. He was however selected for the Auckland team to play against the touring New Zealand side. The match was played on 2 July at Carlaw Park with New Zealand winning 16–9. After some attacking movements "O'Brien dived over" to make the score 8–6 to New Zealand during the first half.

He returned to the Devonport side with several matches and was once again one of their best players despite a 22–5 loss to Ponsonby on 11 July. In a round 1 Roope Rooster win over Marist Old Boys, O'Brien scored the winning try after Alf Scott kicked high and the ball ricocheted off the base of the goal post to him and he "gathered it up and fell over the line". The try gave them a 13–12 lead with the conversion making the final score 15–12. When he scored he "hit the post hard … and play was held up for sometime". The Herald during the week said that O'Brien had been "in the thick of the play, his deadly tackling being a feature of the game". Devonport were knocked out of the Roope Rooster competition the following week and this ended their season.

After the conclusion of the club season O'Brien was selected for a series of representative games. He was first chosen in the Auckland team to play South Auckland on 19 August. The other prop was Arthur Singe, with Alf Townsend at hooker. Auckland won the match by 24 points to 16 to reclaim the Northern Union Challenge Cup which South Auckland had held since 1922. He was then selected to play for Auckland again against the returning New Zealand side who had come home from their Australian tour. He was propping again with Arthur Singe but this time his Devonport teammate Neville St George was at hooker. New Zealand won easily by 41 points to 17 before a large crowd of 17,000 at Carlaw Park. In the first half O'Brien broke quickly from a scrum and took play down to halfway. The New Zealand Truth newspaper said that "O'Brien, with dribbling rushes, was prominent amongst the forwards, and on one occasion he had a run of nearly 50 yards, being only stopped by Gregory, the All Black full-back". After the match the Auckland Star said that the best of Auckland's forwards were "O'Brien and Singe, and they were equal to any in the New Zealand pack". He and Singe, along with Ben Davidson were added by the New Zealand selectors to their squad to prepare to play against the touring Queensland side. The Herald had also noted that "a feature of the game was the excellent display given by the Devonport forward, O'Brien, who was a great worker and must have impressed the New Zealand selectors". He was not selected in the starting thirteen and was named as one of the two forward reserves along with Horace Dixon.

He was however chosen for the Auckland side to play the Queensland tourists on 9 September. His teammate Neville St George was at hooker while his Marist namesake Jim O'Brien was the other prop. In a curious mystery one of them scored a try in their 18–18 draw but it has remained unclear ever since as to which of them scored. The try came late in the match after a "cross-kick by [Maurice] Wetherill was badly missed by [Bill] Spencer, and O'Brien following up gathered in the ball to score". It is perhaps slightly more likely that it was the Devonport O'Brien due to the nature of the try as he was well known for following up on kicks with several of his tries coming from them. The try was converted by Frank Delgrosso and it tied the score at 18 which it remained. The New Zealand Herald described the try in different detail saying that "following a high kick by Singe, Spencer mulled the ball and was bustled by Avery and O'Brien. The latter gathered up the ball and scored".

Jim O'Brien was finally selected to make his New Zealand debut in the second test with Queensland on 12 September at Carlaw Park. He was chosen to play in the second row with Arthur Singe, with Jim O'Brien (Marist), and Ernie Herring in the propping positions. The match was won comfortably by Queensland 35–14 before a crowd of 15,000. He was mentioned in both main newspapers match reports but they did not distinguish between the two of them so it is difficult to know who was featuring though much of it was in good open attacking play.

Following the test O'Brien was chosen for Auckland to play South Auckland in a Northern Union Challenge Cup defence on 19 September. He scored a try after he "accepted a pass which was sent across by Riley" in a 36–19 win. He was named in the reserves for the Auckland Province side to play the touring Queensland side but was not required to take the field and his season was over.

=== Continuation of Devonport and Auckland representation ===
The 1926 season saw O'Brien play 13 matches for Devonport, scoring 4 tries, and a 6 matches for Auckland scoring 5 tries, both career highs for Auckland. The New Zealand selectors were playing several trial matches to try to find the touring side for the England and Wales tour and he played in some of these matches too.

In March he was elected on to the committee of the Devonport United committee at their annual meeting with "about 100 members" in attendance. In their opening match of the season on 24 April against Ponsonby they had several injuries and were only left with three forwards, namely O'Brien, Neville St George, and Horace Dixon. O'Brien and Dixon were "always on the ball", and if not for the injuries may have won the match. In round 4 against Grafton Athletic he was part of a forward pack that "broke away time after time with O'Brien putting in great work". In round 8 he scored in a loss to Ponsonby (19–16) after Cleaver kicked high and the ball struck the goal posts and rebounded into O'Brien's hands. The Auckland Star said that he and teammate Ernest Ruby, "were in the thick of everything".

=== Missed New Zealand selection ===
Jim O'Brien was then selected for Auckland's opening representative match of the season against South Auckland on 26 June. The club competition went into a hiatus for a month as a series of representative matches were played prior to the New Zealand team being selected. He played prop along with Arthur Singe, with Alf Townsend at hooker. The selectors were Edward Fox, Ernie Asher, and Scotty McClymont. The New Zealand Herald remarked that "J O'Brien and [Alf] Scott, both of Devonport, are two players who by sheer ability have earned the right to wear the Auckland jersey… O'Brien is a great worker, His tackling at times is a treat to watch". Auckland thrashed the Waikato-based side 49–15 before 8,000 spectators at Carlaw Park with O'Brien scoring 2 tries. The game was so one sided that when Auckland led 33–3 at halftime they gave no fewer than five players to the South Auckland team to start the second half. His first try came after Hector Cole "made an opening" for him to get across the try line, while his second try was the last of the match and happened after "Avery, Singe, Townsend, and O'Brien broke away, O'Brien scoring for Singe to goal".

After the match the North Island selectors chose their side to play the South Island but Ernie Herring and Arthur Singe were both preferred at prop. O'Brien was however chosen in the curtain raiser which was a New Zealand trial match between A and B sides. He was in the A team with Joe Menzies (Waikato) in the other propping position and they were up against Thomas and Avery. The sides were dominated by Auckland players with only 4 of the 26 named players from outside the Auckland club competition. The match was played on 3 July and saw the B side win 25–16. A massive crowd of 18,000 were present for the inter-island game which followed. He initiated a try early in the second half when from a ruck in the centre of the field he dashed through and set Lou Brown away to combine with Hec Brisbane before Brown scored between the posts. Then shortly after he "heaved a long pass to Brown on the wing, the latter making a short dash, then in-passing to Brisbane, to Riley, who got across wide out". Near the end of the game he got over the line but lost the ball and the game finished shortly after. Four days later on 7 July, O'Brien played in a match for Auckland against "The Rest" of New Zealand. All the matches were being played at Carlaw Park. He was prop with Ernie Herring on the other side of the scrum. Joe Menzies and Alphonsus Carroll were the opposing props. The "Rest of" New Zealand side won the match 28–21 before a midweek crowd of 4,000. O'Brien was then chosen in the final trial match which was for the Possibles in a New Zealand trial. He was at prop along with Menzies and J. Tallentire of the West Coast at hooker. The props for the Probables side were Vivian of Canterbury and Ernie Herring of Auckland.

His Possibles side won the match 32–15 with a crowd of 10,000 on hand. After the match, and an A/B trial played as curtain raiser, the New Zealand selectors chose the touring side for England with O'Brien missing selection. He was named in group of 4 forwards as reserves in case any of those selected was unable to tour. It was said in particular that if a front row forward was to be unavailable O'Brien would have taken their place. The Auckland Star in an article on the selections said that "Clarke, O'Brien (North Shore), and Hutt (Ponsonby) are three good forwards unlucky to miss selection, but in regard to forwards it must be admitted that the selectors greatest difficulty was to decide who to leave out". While the New Zealand Herald said that "it will be recognised that in Menzies and O'Brien two very good forwards were omitted, and both are a little unlucky… O'Brien was always conspicuous by his dashing play and he is equal to any of the front-row forwards chosen".

Following the naming of the New Zealand side the Auckland club competition resumed. In Devonport's first game on 17 July they won 24–0 over Richmond with O'Brien scoring a try after Allan Seagar "despatched O'Brien for a very fine try". After a win over Marist on 24 July the Auckland side was named to play the New Zealand side before their departure. Joe Menzies had been added to the New Zealand touring side as L. Vivian of Canterbury was unable to travel. This meant that if a single forward had thereafter been unable to tour O'Brien would have come into the side. He was propping for Auckland with Jim O'Brien of Marist, up against Frank Henry, and Ernie Herring. It is unlikely that the touring side took the match overly seriously as they were trounced by Auckland 52–32 before a crowd of 14,000 at Carlaw Park on 31 July. O'Brien scored twice with his first coming after a kick from Craddock Dufty was "smothered [by George Wade and] in the scramble for the ball" he secured possession and scored. His second came after the crowd were allegedly shouting "change jerseys" with the Auckland side leading 42–24 and "O'Brien thought he would get a try, so he went over, and St George placed a goal". He was also involved in a first half try to George Wade when "speed from the scrum saw Peckham send O'Brien away. He passed to Wade, who showed rare pace and completed the effort with a fine try". A writer for the Auckland Star said during the following week that "Herring and Thomas are fortunate in getting a trip in preference to O'Brien (Devonport), and [John] Stormont and Jim O'Brien, both of Marist Bros.".

=== Auckland selection ===
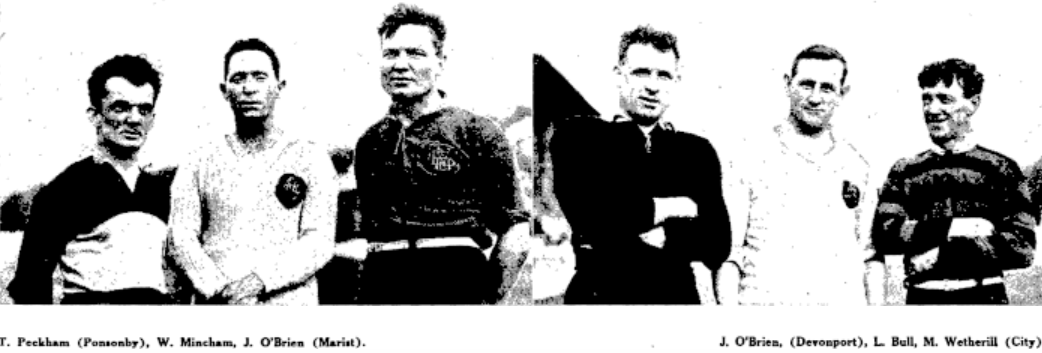
The captains and referees (Tim Peckham, Jim O'Brien (Marist), Jim O'Brien (Devonport), Maurice Wetherill, and referees William Mincham and Les Bull)

O'Brien's next match was for Auckland against Otago. He was originally named in a 19-man squad before making the starting team. It was the first ever time that an Otago team had played in Auckland and they were defeated 14–4. O'Brien and Alf Scott were said to be "the pick of the forwards".

He scored the final try for Devonport in their 42–8 round 11 win over Maritime. He was said to be Devonport's "best forward" along with Alf Scott. He was picked to play for Auckland once more against Canterbury on 28 August at Carlaw Park. Auckland won 33–15 with 7,000 in attendance. It was commented afterwards that "O'Brien again proved a fine forward in the open, and he handled the ball with the ability of a three quarter".

In Devonport's final championship match of the season against City he was said to be the best forward in their 14–9 loss which saw them finish 4th of 7.

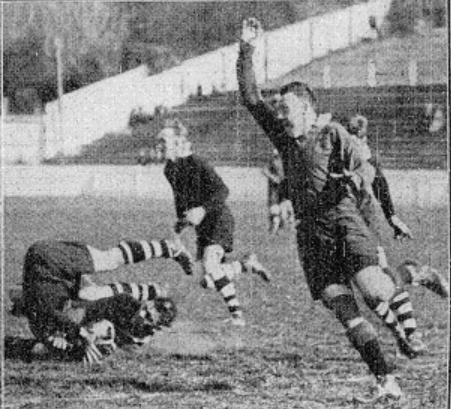
O'Brien being tipped over in a tackle by John Stormont (Marist) at Carlaw Park on 25 September.

A photograph of O'Brien being tackled by John Stormont was published in the New Zealand Herald after the Roope Rooster semi-final win over Marist 28–11.

He was then chosen in the Auckland side to play the South Auckland team from the Waikato on 9 October. Auckland won 35 to 8 with O'Brien gathering a "head high" pass to "gallop straight through and score under the bar". He also initiated a try earlier after he "made an opening for List, whose straight running carried him to the visitors 25, where he passed to Seagar, who cut in nicely and scored". It was commented later how hard he and Lou Hutt worked for Auckland.

His final match of the season was against Richmond Rovers on 16 October in the Roope Rooster final. Devonport lost 16–15 before 4,000 spectators. With the score 16–10 in Richmond's favour he scored a try following a break by Cleaver who passed to Seagar, "who cut in prettily and sent the ball on to O'Brien, who dashed over". O'Brien was "in everything that was going" during the match along with Douglas and Alf Scott.

=== 1927, Devonport captaincy and sendoffs ===
The 1927 season was to be the last significant season of O'Brien's playing career. With Alf Scott not playing for Devonport, O'Brien took over the captaincy of the senior side. He played 11 matches for Devonport, 5 for Auckland, and he also made his solitary appearance for the North Island. At the beginning of the season in early April he was asked to go into training with 18 others to prepare for a match between Auckland and the returning Auckland members of the New Zealand side from their controversial tour of England and Wales. Eight players had gone on strike after falling out with the team coach and would be suspended for life. One of these was fellow Auckland prop, Arthur Singe who had his place taken in the side by Joe Menzies of the Waikato. O'Brien was chosen for the match day side and Auckland won 24–21 before 14,000 spectators. Early in the game he "sent a long pass to List, and the Kingsland centre, racing on a diagonal line, got across with a couple of black backs hanging on to him". The conversion gave Auckland a 5–3 lead. A while later "passing by Clarke to O'Brien to Clarke to Hutt, and back to Clarke – brilliant dove tail play that shattered the tourists' defence – let Clarke in to score with ease". he later lost a scoring opportunity when Clarke "raced through, sending Hutt and O'Brien away, but" O'Brien's "pass to Dixon was forward, and a certain try was lost". It was said after the match that he was "often prominent" with Dixon. In Devonport's season opening game against City O'Brien scored a try in a 23–19 loss. He "stood out for wonderful all-round play" and was a "tireless worker". A week later in a 12–8 loss to Marist O'Brien was badly injured and "treated in the casualty ward for an injury to his head". He had "stood out" among the forwards along with Dick Moisley before he had to go off and was a "fine leader". A spectator commented in a letter to the editor that "O'Brien played a brilliant game marred by an unlucky accident. We have no doubt he would have scored otherwise". He missed Devonport's next match against Grafton but returned for their next match against Richmond on Friday 3 June as part of the King's Birthday celebrations. He scored a try late in the match won by Devonport 17–13. The try put Devonport in the lead 14–13 but the game was marred by the sending off of 4 players near the end. Neville St George had exchanged words with the referee and was sent from the field, then Stewart from Richmond was ordered off 2 minutes later before Stan Prentice and the O'Brien soon received their marching orders too. The New Zealand Herald said "it is to be regretted that O'Brien, the Devonport captain, and Prentice, Richmond, earned the displeasure of the referee", though "O'Brien's sound handling was a feature of his play".

In an article on the representative sides for the season the Auckland Star suggested that O'Brien, Bert Avery, Alan Clarke, Lou Hutt, and J. Payne were the best prospects for the loose forward positions. In Devonport's 32–8 win over Newton on 18 June O'Brien "played splendidly in the forwards" After their 10–3 win over City the following week he was said to be "always in the picture" and a portrait photograph of O'Brien was published in the article. While the Herald said he "is undoubtedly one of the finest forwards playing the code". In their 2 July loss to Marist by 16 points to 6 O'Brien was sent off for the second time in the season in front of a large crowd of 11,000. A punch had been thrown by a Devonport player and then "a moment later when the referee sorted out a tangle of players and gave J. O'Brien (Devonport) a free pass to the side line, the crowd cheering a sympathetic action when J. O'Brien (Marist) stopped to shake hands with his namesake". After the match the Devonport supporters went on to the field to voice their opinion. It was reported that "penalties against Devonport were responsible for most of the outbursts of derisive comment and shouted protest, and a particularly active demonstration followed the ordering off of O'Brien, the Devonport captain, for alleged rough play. When the full-time whistle blew an angry crowd surged toward the referee, who was closely attended by two policemen as he walked from the field". The referee was H. Taylor who was pulled in to referee prior to the match after W. Ripley was unable to due to illness. The Sun reported that "the play went perilously close to getting completely out of hand and after a general warning to the two teams, O'Brien… was sent from the field". Jack Kirwan of the Marist side asked the referee to allow O'Brien to stay on the field. it was also reported that "up to the time that the referee sent him off, O'Brien was playing a great game. His alleged misdeed was not in sight-seeing range of the press bench, and the first indication of something untoward was the Shore forward trekking for the sideline, holding uplifted hands as a token of injured innocence". The Auckland Rugby League judicial committee recommended that O'Brien should be stood down for one game and the recommendation was approved. During the week the Devonport club sent a letter to the Marist club stating "my club wishes to place upon record its keen appreciation of the fine sporting spirit displayed by Kirwan and O'Brien when they interceded on behalf of J. O'Brien (Shore) on the occasion of the player being ordered off. The attitude taken up by the players mentioned calls forth our highest admiration". He missed the match against Grafton before returning to play Richmond on 6 August. Devonport won 18–8 with O'Brien grafting hard along with Sid Rule and Neville St George, and he and Ruby "were outstanding in the loose". In Devonport's last match for the championship where they finished third of seven they lost 5–0 to City. O'Brien "was keen in the loose and strong in the ruck".

=== Auckland vice-captaincy and North Island selection ===
On 28 August the Auckland selectors (Asher, Fox, and Blakey) chose O'Brien among a squad of 18 for their southern tour.

Their first match was against Canterbury at Monica Park in Christchurch on 10 September. Before a crowd of 3,000 Auckland won 24–13 with O'Brien and Lou Hutt making "many openings for their side by fine play". He was one of their outstanding players along with Maurice Wetherill, Stan Prentice, Wilson, and Wally Somers. In their next match against a combined West Coast/Buller team, won by Auckland 42–15 at Victoria Park, in Greymouth, O'Brien was "conspicuous" among the forwards.

O'Brien had been named vice-captain for the tour with Maurice Wetherill as captain. They were also appointed selectors along with William Mincham who was on tour as the manager.

Their next match came at the Caledonian Ground in Dunedin and saw Auckland beat Otago 201–3 with O'Brien scoring a try. It came after Wetherill initiated a clever movement near halfway got the Auckland backs going, with George Wade carrying on with O'Brien who scored near the posts with Craddock Dufty converting to give Auckland a 10–5 lead. O'Brien was not selected (by himself) for the final tour match against Wellington at Newtown Park, Wellington in a match Auckland won 41–23.

He was then selected to make his first ever appearance in the inter-island match between North Island and South Island on 24 September at Carlaw Park. He was chosen at prop along with Timms from the Waikato and Wally Somers at hooker. Auckland won 13–8 before 7,000 spectators. O'Brien was said to have been "in everything that was going" and provided good support to Timms who was outstanding.

O'Brien was then named in the Auckland team to play Buller but he informed the selectors that he was unavailable and Trevor Hall replaced him in the side. He was however available to play in Auckland's final representative match of the season against South Auckland on 15 October. Auckland lost the match 29–12 before 5,000 spectators and they also relinquished the Northern Union Challenge Cup. His final match of the season was for Devonport in their Roope Rooster final defeat to Richmond by 7 points to 6.

=== Final season and first club championship ===
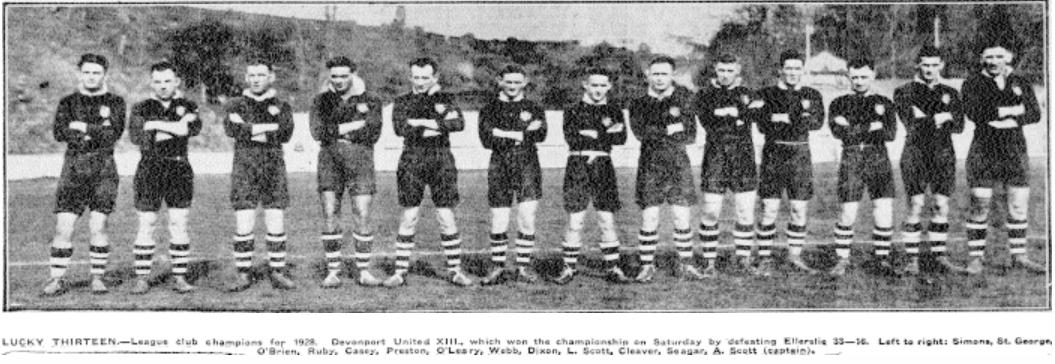

At the start of the season it was reported that O'Brien was likely to play once more. However he had retired and after 5 rounds with the representative season approaching the Herald said that the selectors had a difficulty in the front row as "last season with O'Brien (Marist) and O'Brien (Devonport), Auckland had two of the best front row forwards seen for years. The pair were masters in scrum work and deadly tacklers in the loose". The Auckland Star also wrote that "the selectors will probably be faced with the difficulty of getting the class of forward for the front row that is required, seeing that since last season two stalwarts in J. O'Brien (Marist) and J. O'Brien (Devonport) have dropped out, and there is the obvious difficulty in finding two players of similar physique and skill to take their places".

Two weeks later however in round 8 O'Brien of Devonport came out of retirement to play for Devonport in their match with City Rovers at the Devonport Domain. Devonport won the match narrowly by 8 points to 6. They were undefeated to this point with 7 wins from 7 matches. He was listed in the reserves but started the match. It was said that he "did some solid tackling" and "making his first appearance, played an excellent game". Two weeks later after consecutive losses to Newton and Marist it was commented that he "lacked condition". The match was also notable because his Marist namesake had come out of retirement to play for them. After another loss to Richmond the Herald said that "O'Brien proved he has the offside rule down to a fine art". The match was played at a frenetic pace and was widely praised in the media. The Sun noted that he "was frequently in the picture" along with Sid Rule and Neville St George. While the Star said "O'Brien's reappearance has strengthened the side, and on his showing he merits consideration for the representative selections". In a 24–6 win over Ponsonby in round 13 O'Brien scored his first points of the season when he crossed for 2 tries. The first came when he fielded a wild clearing kick from Letton "and, being unmarked, went across for an easy try" with Len Scott converting to give Devonport a 10–0 lead. Then in the second half Ernest Ruby "raced through the Ponsonby backs, passing to O'Brien who raced in between the posts" with Ruby converting for a 21–0 lead. Then a week later Devonport sealed their third ever championship which was the first of O'Brien's career. The North Shore club had previously won in 1913, and 1914. Remarkably despite being a strong club in the 1920s it was their only major title. O'Brien scored another try in the 33–16 win, with "poor tackling by Ellerslie enabling him to race over from the twenty-five". The Sun said that he and Ruby were the two "crack Shore forwards". it was also suggested that he "was one of the shining lights of the Shore van and is a much better forward than some people – even rep. selectors – think that he is".

O'Brien was then selected for the Auckland squad to go into training for their match with Otago on 15 September. He played in a round 1 Roope Rooster win over Ellerslie before being selected for the starting side for the Auckland match. Despite this he did not play in the game so must have been unavailable.

He finished the season with two final games for Devonport. The first was a semi-final loss to Marist on 22 September before his last ever match which was against Marist again in the Stormont Shield final which was played between the winners of the championship and the winners of the Roope Rooster knockout competition. In the Roope Rooster semi-final loss it was said that he "played well" along with Rule and Casey. O'Brien was selected for the Auckland team to play North Auckland on 6 October in Whangārei but withdrew and so ended his career after nine seasons of senior rugby league at the age of 32. The following year in 1929, he was on the junior management committee of the Devonport club.

=== Coaching ===
In 1931, O'Brien was chosen to coach the Devonport senior side. They finished runner up in the championship with a 10 win - 2 loss record before going on to win the Roope Rooster competition when they defeated Ponsonby 34-17 in the final. They then played Marist (who had won the championship) for the Stormont Shield and won 25-6.

== Life and death ==
Jim O'Brien was a painter by trade. In the early 1920s, he was living at 12 Rutland Road in Devonport with his brother John Terence. They still resided there in 1925 and 1928 according to the censuses. In 1925, he was the president of the Dominion Painters' Federation and represented them at the bi-annual conference of unions in Napier. In 1927, his father, James died while still living on the West Coast of the South Island in Brunnerton, Grey.

He was also a fire fighter and in 1929 won a competition at the Marine Borough Fire Brigade competition for the Fletcher Cup at Takapuna. It involved a "two man coupling event (old style)" and he won with foreman Colley. In August 1930 he was presented with a certificate for 3 years service in the fire brigade at the annual smoke concert of the Devonport Municipal Volunteer Fire Brigade.

The following year in 1931 O'Brien married Dorothy Franklin on 6 April at the All Souls' Church, Devonport. Dorothy had been born on 9 September 1903, in Rotherham, England. She was the eldest daughter of Mr. and Mrs. C.F. Franklin, of Empire Road, Devonport. After leaving the church the couple "passed through the guard of honour formed by the Children of Mary, and under the raised hatchets of members of the Devonport Fire Brigade, of which the bridegroom is a member". Dorothy was "a sister of Sister Nellie, of the 3rd Order of Mary, France, who left New Zealand 13 months [prior] to devote her life to nursing the lepers at Makogai". They had a son on 31 July 1932, at the Pentlands Private Hospital in Devonport. The hospital was located at 19 Buchanan Street and existed from 1926 to 1975. At the time they were living on 6 Grove Road, Devonport and remained there until the early 1950s according to census records.

In February 1935, O'Brien travelled to a National fire brigade competition at Blenheim. In 1940, he presented "gold stars" to fire brigade members for 25 years service.

By 1957, the family had moved to the Devonport Fire Station to live as he was the fire officer there. Then in 1960 they had moved to 12 Waimana Avenue on Northcote Point though he still had the position of fire officer. By the early 1960s he had retired and remained living on Waimana Avenue for several decades.

Jim and Dorothy had another two daughters. One of whom (the youngest) was Mary O'Brien-Specht who was born at Pentlands in 1937. Mary left New Zealand in 1963 to pursue an operatic singing career. She had been tutored by Dame Sister Mary Leo who had also tutored Dame Kiri Te Kanawa and Dame Malvina Major. Mary won the John Court Memorial Aria competition in 1958 and in 1959 won the Mobil Song Quest which had started in 1956. In 1959, she joined the New Zealand Opera Company. In 1963 she moved to Sydney to perform and then in 1965 made the move to Europe and sang in Linz, Austria. She performed throughout Europe and later moved to the United States and married Don Specht. When she phoned up her father Jim to tell him of her engagement he replied "so you're going to marry a Yank?". She last performed in the late 1980s and retired in Los Angeles before he husband's death. She then returned to live in New Zealand. As of 2016 both her siblings were still alive, her brother living in Papakura and older sister in a convent in Dunedin after she had become a nun aged 20.

Jim O'Brien's brother John died in 1975 and his other brother Patrick died in 1983.

Jim's wife, Dorothy died on 19 January 1987, and Jim died a little over a year later on 6 April 1988, aged 91 while they both still resided on the North Shore of Auckland. Jim is buried in the military section of the Waikaraka Cemetery.
