= Gordon Campbell (rugby league) =

New Zealand international rugby league player

Personal information
- Full name: Gordon Campbell
- Born: 1906 New Zealand
- Died: New Zealand
- Weight: 11 st 3 lb (71 kg)

Playing information
- Position: Hooker
Club
Years	Team	Pld	T	G	FG	P
1924–27	Richmond Rovers	17	4	0	0	12
1928–34	Marist Old Boys	83	5	3	0	21
1931	Marist-Devonport	1	0	0	0	0
1934–36	Mount Albert United	11	0	0	0	0
	Total	112	9	3	0	33
Representative
Years	Team	Pld	T	G	FG	P
1926	Auckland Colts	1	0	0	0	0
1928–32	Auckland Trials	2	0	0	0	0
1931	North Island	1	0	0	0	0
1928–33	Auckland	7	1	0	0	3
1932	New Zealand	2	0	0	0	0

Coaching information
Representative
Years	Team	Gms	W	D	L	W%
1938	Ponsonby United	20	10	0	10	50

Gordon Campbell was a rugby league player who represented New Zealand in 2 tests in 1932 against England. Campbell played in the position of hooker. In the process he became the 223rd player to represent New Zealand.

== Playing career ==
=== Richmond Rovers junior and senior debut ===
Gordon Campbell played for Richmond Rovers as a junior. In 1924 he was a member of their 3rd grade team. In 1925 he had moved into their 2nd grade side who won the championship.

He made his senior debut in 1924 though he only played one match. In 1926 he became a regular player in their first grade side and it was reported in the Auckland Star that “Richmond, in Prentice, Stevenson, and Campbell, three of last year’s junior players, have a trio of good young fellows who will further improve on their play”. He ultimately played 12 matches for Richmond and was a part of the Roope Rooster winning team on October 16 when they defeated Devonport United 16–15 in the final. Remarkably after just 6 games he was named as a reserve for Auckland's match against New Zealand on July 31 but he was not required to take the field. Then he was named in the Auckland squad to train for their match with Canterbury on August 28 after hooker Alf Townsend withdrew from the side. However once again he was not needed with Neville St George playing at hooker. On October 30 he did however make his debut representative appearance which was for the Auckland Colts against the B Division representative team. The young Auckland side won by 24 points to 17 at Carlaw Park.

In 1927 he only played for Richmond 9 times after being injured early in the season and then his season finished prematurely after he last appeared in their round 11 match on July 30. He scored two tries during the season in what was to be a rare feat in his career. He scored his first try in the senior grade on May 14 against City Rovers in a 15 all draw. His try came after Jim Parkes did well in the lead up to give them a 3–0 lead. Alf Townsend had withdrawn from the City side which meant they were without a recognised hooker and Campbell repeatedly won possession for Richmond from the scrums. Early in the second half however Campbell sustained an injury to his thigh and was carried off and admitted to Auckland Hospital though his condition was reported as “satisfactory”. It was expected that he would be “unable to play for some weeks”. He ultimately only missed their round 3 match against Marist though the Auckland Star stated that Richmond “grievously missed the services of Campbell, a clever hooker, now on the injured list”.

=== Transfer to Marist ===
At the beginning of the 1928 season Campbell transferred to Marist Old Boys. He played 15 matches for them during the year and scored 1 try. Following a round 10 match against Devonport United it was said that he “surprised everyone by beating St. George for the ball” in the scrums. In a match report it was said that Devonport “have to hand it to “Stump” Campbell for blocking them in the scrums, though the referee was decidedly lenient towards him, for he frequently swung across before the ball was ever put in”. After the match he was chosen for a midweek Auckland trial match and played for the Probables side on July 11. His team was defeated 24–14 with Campbell being injured and missing a match for Marist the following weekend. He was injured again in the Roope Rooster semi final win over Devonport on September 22 and was carried off with an ankle injury. He was out for a month but returned to play in the Labour Day tournament final on October 27. Marist defeated Richmond Rovers 12–5.

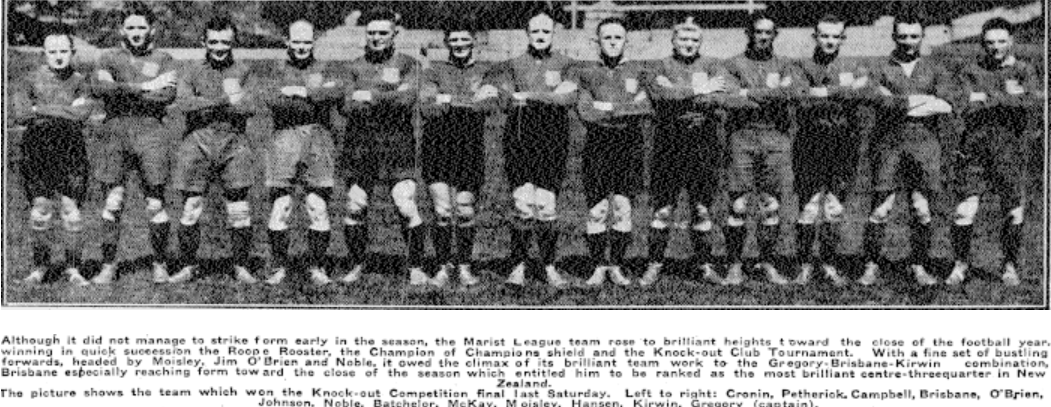
Campbell, 3rd from left in the 1928 championship team.

In 1929 Campbell played 21 games for Marist but could not break into the Auckland side. He was chosen in the squad for the game against Northland on July 27 but was not picked to play however he came on as a replacement. He ultimately scored the last try of the match which handed Auckland a 22–19 victory. He was chosen again for the squad for the match with Canterbury but was only listed as an emergency player for their August 24 match. The Marist side could only finish mid table in the championship but their form improved later in the season and Campbell was part of the side which won the Roope Rooster against Ponsonby United on September 21 by 17 points to 9. Then a week later they lifted the Stormont Shield after defeating the same opponents 28-14 before 9,000 spectators at Carlaw Park. The South Sydney side was touring in mid October, becoming the first ever club side from Australia to do so and the Auckland Rugby League decided to match them against the Marist senior side on consecutive weekends. South Sydney had won the 1929 NSWRFL championship less than a month earlier. Campbell was at hooker for both matches which saw Marist win on October 12 by 10 points to 9, and lose on October 19 by 21 to 5. In the first match it was said that “the visitors gained the ball from the scrums in the early stages, but later on Campbell secured more than his share”.

1930 was a similar season for Campbell. He played 14 games for Marist and was only picked in the Auckland squad for a match against the New Zealand side which was returning from their tour of Australia. However he was only named in the emergency players for the match and did not take the field.

=== North Island selection ===
1931 saw Campbell play 14 games for Marist and he scored 2 tries in a match against Richmond on May 2. In a June 6 match against the same opponents he was carried off on a stretcher said to “be badly hurt” and taken to Auckland Hospital though he was released to return home the same day. On August 8 Marist won the championship with a win over Devonport.

Following their championship win Campbell was selected for the North Island side to play against the South Island in their annual inter-island fixture. It was said that he justified his inclusion through consistent performances throughout the season. The match was played on Carlaw Park on August 15 and saw the North Island side run out 52-23 winners. Campbell was reported to have “hooked the ball grandly” in the scrums.

Campbell was then selected in the Auckland squad to play against Northland but he did not make the match day side. At the same time the Eastern Suburbs side from Sydney was touring Auckland and it was said that “it is a pity Campbell cannot test himself against the Eastern Suburbs hooker, as the Marist forward is in a class by himself” as Marist was not on the itinerary. He was however chosen to play for the combined Marist-Devonport side to play Eastern Suburbs on October 17. The combined side defeated the tourists 14-13 before a crowd of 15,000 at Carlaw Park with Campbell's hooking described as “praiseworthy” as he won a lot of possession.

=== New Zealand selection ===
In 1932 Campbell made 12 appearances for Marist including a 28-8 Roope Rooster final win over City Rovers. He was unavailable to play in the Stormont Shield final win the week following.

His first representative match of the season was for an Auckland XIII against South Auckland on July 16. Auckland won the match by 29 points to 13. The following weekend he was selected in a Probables side to play a Possibles team. A series of trial matches were being played to aid the selectors in choosing the New Zealand team to play them in the test series. His Probable's side won by 37 points to 16.

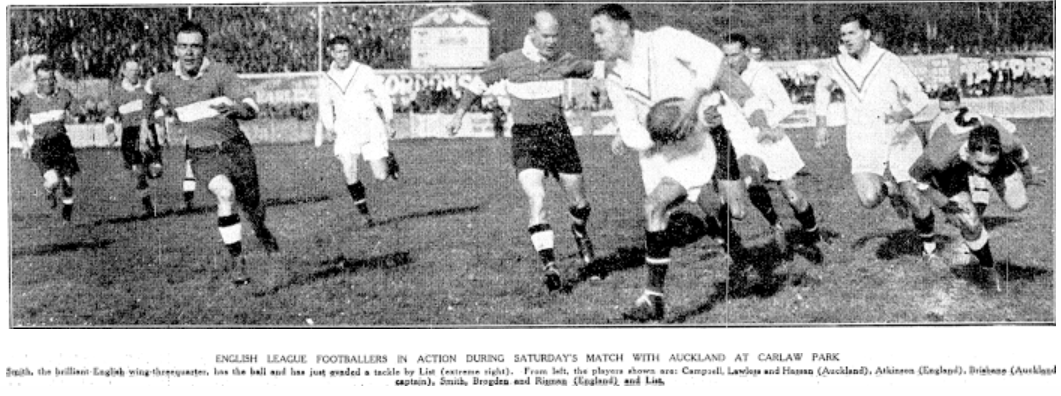

Then on August 6 he played for Auckland against the touring English side. Auckland played well before losing 19–14 at Carlaw Park before a crowd of 15,000. New Zealand had lost the first test a week earlier and it was said that Campbell had been “far more successful getting the ball from the scrums than (E.) St. George [the Newton Rangers hooker] in the test match. England gained possession on 34 occasions and Auckland 29 times”.

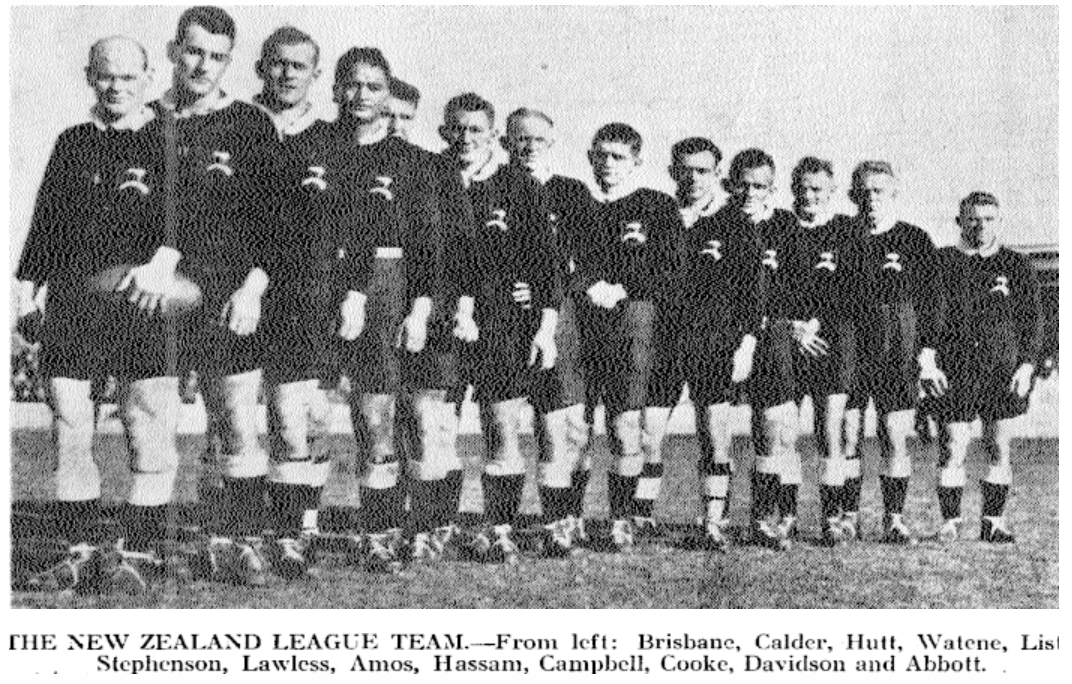

Campbell's display was good enough to gain him selection in the New Zealand team for the second test at Monica Park in Christchurch on August 13. New Zealand went down by 25 points to 14 before a crowd of 6,000. Of the scrums it was said that England “used every ounce of their weight when called upon, and occasionally robbed New Zealand of their advantage of very fast hooking. The scrums were not monopolised by any side. England had the advantage in the first spell, at one time having fourteen to the Blacks’ five, and three had been indecisive. Then the positions changed and New Zealand won about ten in a row. The final figures were England 24, New Zealand 22 and six indecisive”. He had been up against English hooker Les White. England had used the huge weight advantage to push New Zealand back in almost every first half scrum but in the second “Campbell managed to get a fair share of the ball”. Campbell was busy around the field also and he and Amos “were often noted in fast breaks with the ball at toe”. He was then chosen again for the third test at Carlaw Park. The Auckland Star reported that “a solid and fast pack has been chosen. Campbell, the Marist hooker, who by his success in the second match, has proved himself the best rake in New Zealand, should have a better opportunity to prove his worth”. New Zealand produced their best effort of the season but was defeated to a last minute try by 20 points to 18. It was said to be one of the hardest fought games ever seen on Carlaw Park with 14,000 present. Campbell again did well in the scrums and “obtained possession on 38 occasions and White 30 times”.

=== Return to Marist and regular Auckland appearances ===
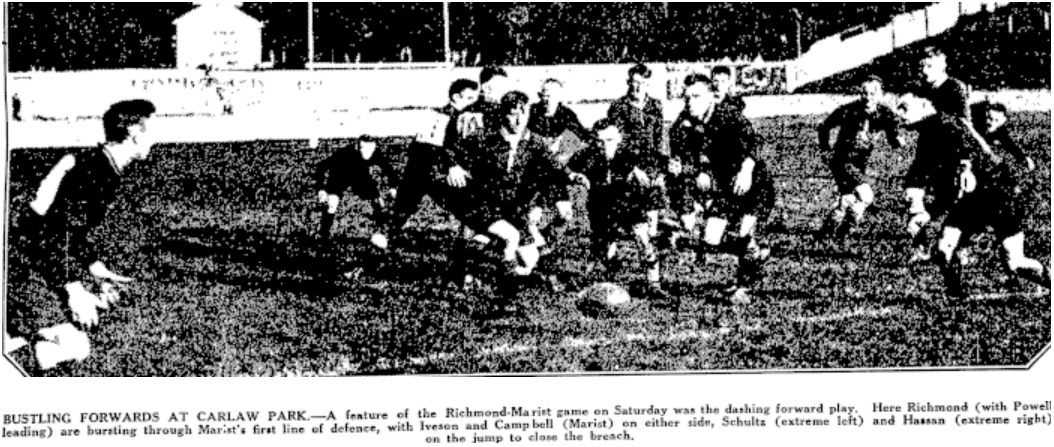
Campbell just to the right of the ball in a match for Marist v Richmond in 1933 at Carlaw Park.

The 1933 season again saw Campbell playing for the Marist senior side. He played in 13 matches though Marist did not lift and silver wear during the season. They did however easily beat the touring St George side by 25 points to 11 before 13,000 at Carlaw Park on September 30.

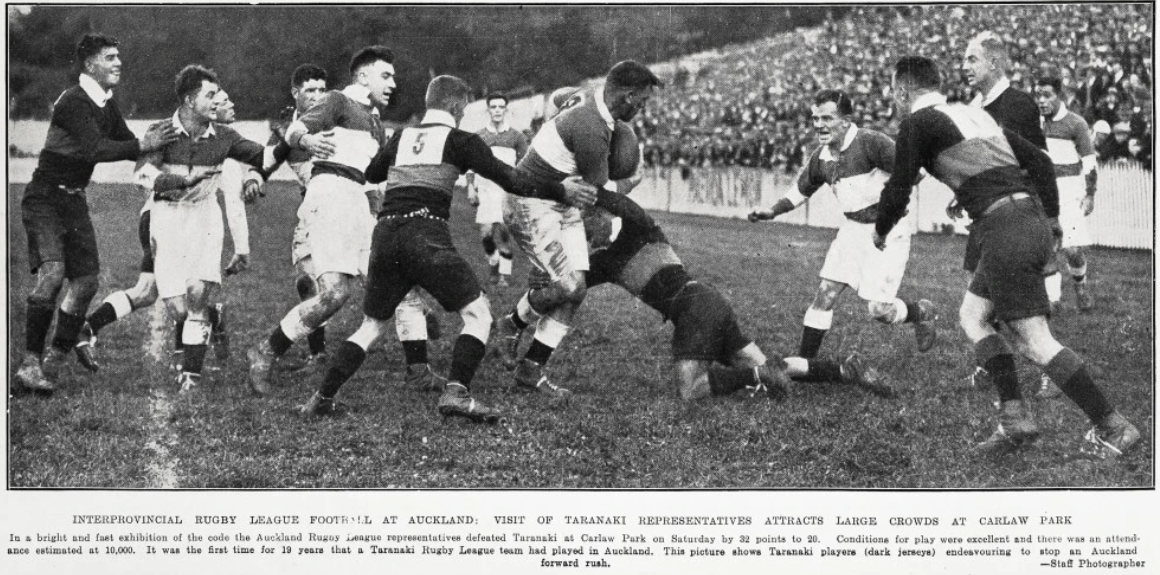
Campbell in support of the ball carrier in Auckland's win over Taranaki on June 10, 1933.

It was the first year that he was regularly picked in the Auckland side after only having made 3 appearances in total in the previous 2 seasons. He played for Auckland against Taranaki on June 10 and was said to be far more prominent than usual. Auckland won the match by 32 points to 20. He was injured in a club match against Ponsonby on June 24 and missed 2 matches for Marist and was then unavailable for Auckland for their match with South Auckland.

He returned to play for Marist and then was selected for Auckland's match with North Auckland on August 12. Auckland won by 28 to 13. The Auckland Star writer said that “Campbell hooked the ball for Auckland, but there are many who claim that his peculiar method is illegal”. He was chosen again in the Auckland side for their match with the West Coast however he was unable to play due to a leg injury with Len Schultz taking his place though it was said that he intended to play in their next match against Hawke's Bay. He did indeed play against Hawke's Bay with Auckland running out easy 47-17 winners. His final match for Auckland was against South Auckland on September 9. Auckland won by 17 to 5.

=== Retirement and transfer to Mount Albert United ===
Campbell had decided to retire at the start of the 1934 season. However he came out of retirement for Marist's round 3 match against City. In early June Campbell was involved with a dispute along with 7 other senior Marist players with the committee. The 8 players refused to play. The players concerned were Campbell, along with Charles Dunne, Des Herring, Wilf Hassan, the 3 Schultz brothers (including Len and Bill), and Claude List. An official statement from the club committee said “that several committee members and some players were dissatisfied on a point of club finance, whether portion of expenditure should apply to senior players alone or be devoted to general club services, including juniors. It was found legally essential to hold the annual meeting over again in order to correct previous unconstitutional procedure. Apparently this caused the eight players mentioned to attempt to embarrass the club by adopting an attitude of passive resistance. Realising it was possible that the players were being misled, the club made every effort to reason with them, and the committee was fortunate to find it had the co-operation of many young players willing and capable of assisting in an emergency”. He retired once more and thanked the club though he later transferred to the Mount Albert United. Mount Albert were in their first ever first grade appearances. Indeed, Campbell was to play in their first ever first grade match in a round 1 Roope Rooster clash with Ponsonby on August 18 at Carlaw Park. Mount Albert lost 19–11. Campbell began playing for them to start the 1935 season but was only listed in one match day side which was their round 1 match against City Rovers. He did however turnout for them again a few times in 1936 helping the side out due to injuries. At the end of the season he retired for the last time.

=== Coaching Ponsonby United ===
In 1938 it was reported that he was to coach the Ponsonby senior side along with former New Zealand star Bill Davidson. Then in 1939 he was named as selector of the top side at Ponsonby.

=== New Zealand RL Old Boys Association ===
In 1940 Campbell was the chairman of the New Zealand Rugby League Old Boys Association. The following year in 1941 he played for the New Zealand Old Boys team against a South Auckland veterans team at Carlaw Park.
