= Patrick Walsh (piper) =

- Origin: County Mayo, Ireland
- Occupation: Piper
- Instrument: Pipes
- Years active: 1850s/1860s

Patrick Walsh (fl. 1850s/1860s) was an Irish piper.

Little is known of Walsh, beyond that he was a native of County Mayo, large in stature, and lived about the middle of the nineteenth century. He believed he inherited his gifts from the fairies.

== Career ==
He emigrated to Lancashire, playing every night for good wages. One night, some new customers rudely ordered him to put away his pipes and let their friend, a fiddler, play instead. In response, he "sailed into the crowd and put them to rout".

He returned to Ireland, settling in Swinford, County Mayo, where he taught the pipes to many pupils. O'Neill says that "His method of dismissing his pupils was as unceremonious as his own departure from England. When one had mastered a tune Walsh took the pupil’s hat and hung it outdoors as a signal for the owner to follow it. Without any unnecessary words another aspirant for musical learning was taken in hand and treated similarly". Among his acquaintances were James O'Brien and Piper Cribben.
