= Jimmy O'Brien =

Jimmy O'Brien may refer to:

- Jimmy O'Brien (hurler), Irish hurler
- Jimmy O'Brien (rugby union), Irish rugby union player
- Jimmy O'Brien (footballer) (1885–1954), Australian rules footballer for Essendon
- Jomboy (sports media), YouTuber who is named Jimmy O'Brien
