= James William O'Brien =

American politician (1879–1960)

James William O'Brien (March 2, 1879 – October 7, 1960) was an American farmer and politician.

O'Brien was born in Stillwater, Washington County, Minnesota and was a farmer. He lived in Stillwater, Minnesota and served in the Minnesota House of Representatives from 1943 to 1952.
