= Jamie O'Brien =

Jamie O'Brien may refer to:

- Jamie O'Brien (footballer) (born 1990), Irish professional football player
- Jamie O'Brien (surfer) (born 1983), surfer from Hawaii
- Jamie O'Brien (beauty queen) (born 1988), from Maryland

== See also ==
- James O'Brien (disambiguation)
