= James O'Brien (piper) =

- Born: 1823; Swinford, County Mayo
- Origin: Ireland
- Died: 1885 (aged 61–62)
- Occupation: Piper

James O'Brien (1823–1885), Irish piper.

O'Brien was born in Swinford, County Mayo. He was friendly with Piper Cribben, and became his pupil, and was acquainted with Patrick Walsh (piper). He was neither blind nor lame, but took up music for the sheer love of it. However, after emigrating to England, he suffered a spinal injury while working in a stone quarry which disabled him from hard manual labour, so he was forced to rely upon music as his sole source of income.

O'Brien played all over the north of England, in taverns, picnics, and fairs. He was especially fond of Yorkshire and Lancashire, but was known to wander as far south as Devon.

Captain Francis O'Neill tells of him:

"While sauntering along a highway one day he came to a fine-looking mansion, and, being thirsty, he went up to the hall door and rang the bell. An old lady, whose head was crowned with a wealth of snow-white hair, responded. When O’Brien announced the object of his call she asked him where he came from."

"On learning that he was an Irishman she further inquired if he knew a place called Ballinamuck. Of course he did, for it was close to his birthplace. Then the mystery of her interest in Irish topography was revealed."

"Her son, an officer in the English army, was killed in that vicinity a little while before the battle of Ballinamuck, in September, 1798. When the Irish and French troops were marching towards the town, followed closely by the English."

"A French soldier dropped out of the ranks, too ill to proceed farther, and crawled behind a stone wall to die. Seeing the English force marching by a short time later, he took deliberate aim at an officer and shot him dead. The victim was the whitewhaired lady's son."

"Notwithstanding a bereaved mother's cherished grief, O’Brien's thirst was assuaged with a beverage stronger than water."

He relocated to the United States in the early 1860s, disembarking at Portland, Maine and proceeding from there to all Irish communities in the state before going on to Boston, Massachusetts. In 1875, he settled in Chicago, staying at the home of Roger Walsh (formerly of Portland). Here he made the acquaintance of Captain Francis O'Neill, who in 1913 wrote "Many a pleasant hour the present writer spent listening to “Jimmy's” delightful music and memorizing his tunes, many of which were not in circulation until given publicity through our efforts."

After his death in 1885, his pipes were held by John Doyle, and after his passing, to Sergeant James Early.
