= James O'Brien (oceanographer) =

James J. O'Brien (August 10, 1935 – September 20, 2016) was an emeritus Robert O. Lawton Professor of Meteorology and Oceanography at Florida State University. He believed sea levels were rising but predicted a more modest 18-inch (46 cm) rise instead of 6 feet (1.8 m) by 2100 targeted by some other scientists. He stated that "sea level in Florida is going to continue to rise period. Unless we go back into an Ice age, we will continue to rise at over 8 inches (20 cm) in 10 year. That's without any global warming."

O'Brien got his bachelor's degree from Rutgers University before obtaining his M.Sc. and Ph.D. from Texas A&M University.

He was a fellow of the Norwegian Academy of Science and Letters from 2000.

== Notes ==
Prof. James J. O'Brien from FSU is not the same person as Jim O'Brien, chair and co-founder of the Irish Climate Science Forum. The latter Jim O'Brien is best known for his promotion of the idea that climate change is not problematic and that it will benefit the planet.
