= Jim O'Brien (Tipperary hurler) =

Irish hurler

Jim "Hawk" O'Brien
Personal information
- Native name: Séamus Ó Briain (Irish)
- Born: Thurles, County Tipperary, Ireland

Sport
- Sport: Hurling
- Position: Goalkeeper
Club
- Years: Club
- Thurles Blues
Club titles
- Tipperary titles: 6
Inter-county
- Years: County
- 1904-1912: Tipperary
Inter-county titles
- Munster titles: 3
- All-Irelands: 2

Jim "Hawk" O'Brien was an Irish hurler who played as a goalkeeper for the Tipperary senior team.

Born in Thurles, County Tipperary, O'Brien first arrived on the inter-county scene when he first linked up with the Tipperary senior team. He made his senior debut during the 1904 championship. O'Brien went on to play a key role for the team over the next decade, and won two All-Ireland medals and three Munster medals. He was an All-Ireland runner-up on one occasion.

At club level O'Brien was a six-time championship medallist with Thurles.

His retirement came following the conclusion of the 1912 championship.

== Honours ==
=== Team ===
Thurles

- Tipperary Senior Club Hurling Championship (6) 1904, 1906, 1907, 1908, 1909, 1911

Tipperary

- All-Ireland Senior Hurling Championship (2): 1906, 1908
- Munster Senior Hurling Championship (3): 1906, 1908, 1909
