= Jimmy O'Brien (footballer) =

Australian rules footballer

Personal information
- Full name: James O'Brien
- Born: 24 July 1885; Port Melbourne, Victoria
- Died: 24 February 1954 (aged 68); Prahran, Victoria

Playing career^{1}
Years	Club	Games (Goals)
1905	Essendon	8 (0)
- ^{1} Playing statistics correct to the end of 1905.

James O'Brien (24 July 1885 – 24 February 1954) was an Australian rules footballer who played with Essendon in the Victorian Football League (VFL).
