= Horace Dixon =

New Zealand international rugby league footballer

Personal information
- Full name: Horace William Oscar Dixon
- Born: 1 February 1899; Waihi, Waikato, New Zealand
- Died: 7 March 1978 (aged 79); Wellington, New Zealand

Playing information
- Position: SR
Club
Years	Team	Pld	T	G	FG	P
1925–30	Devonport (ARL)	64	21	0	0	63
Representative
Years	Team	Pld	T	G	FG	P
1925–28	Auckland	12	9	0	0	27
1925	New Zealand	4	0	0	0	0
1925	North Island	1	1	0	0	3
- Source: As of 19 April 2020

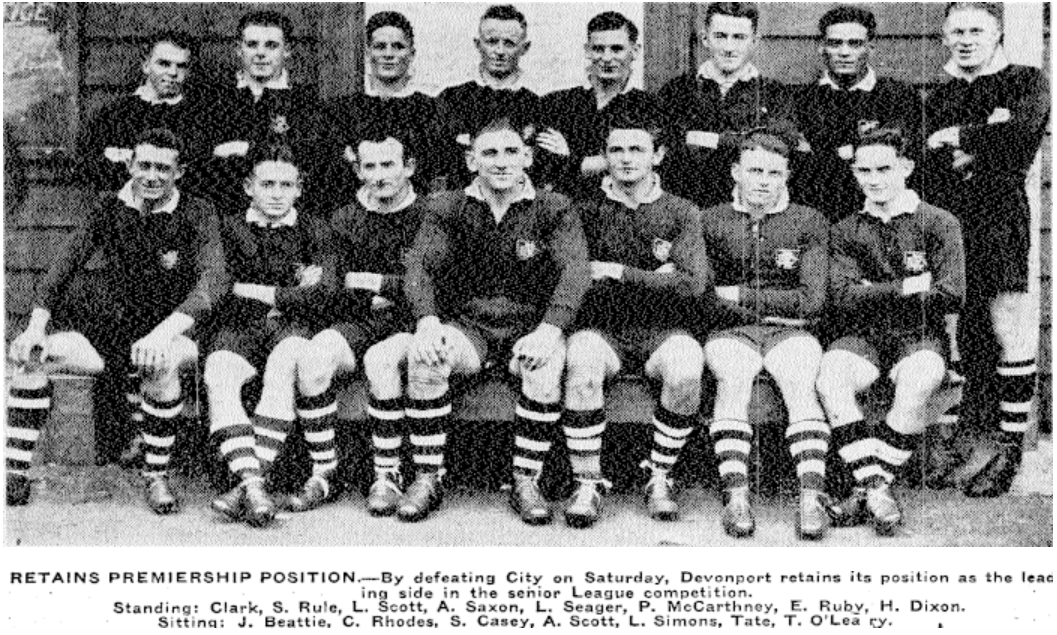

Horace William Oscar Dixon (1 February 1899 – 7 March 1978) was a New Zealand rugby league player who represented New Zealand.

== Playing career ==
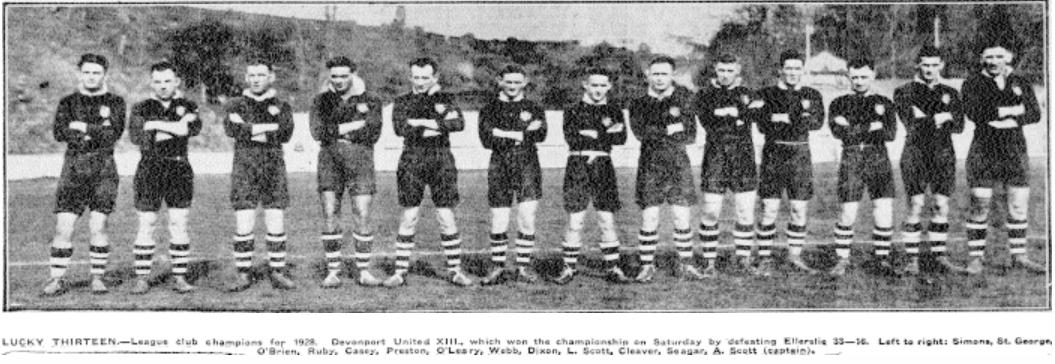

Dixon played for the Devonport club in the Auckland Rugby League competition and represented Auckland.

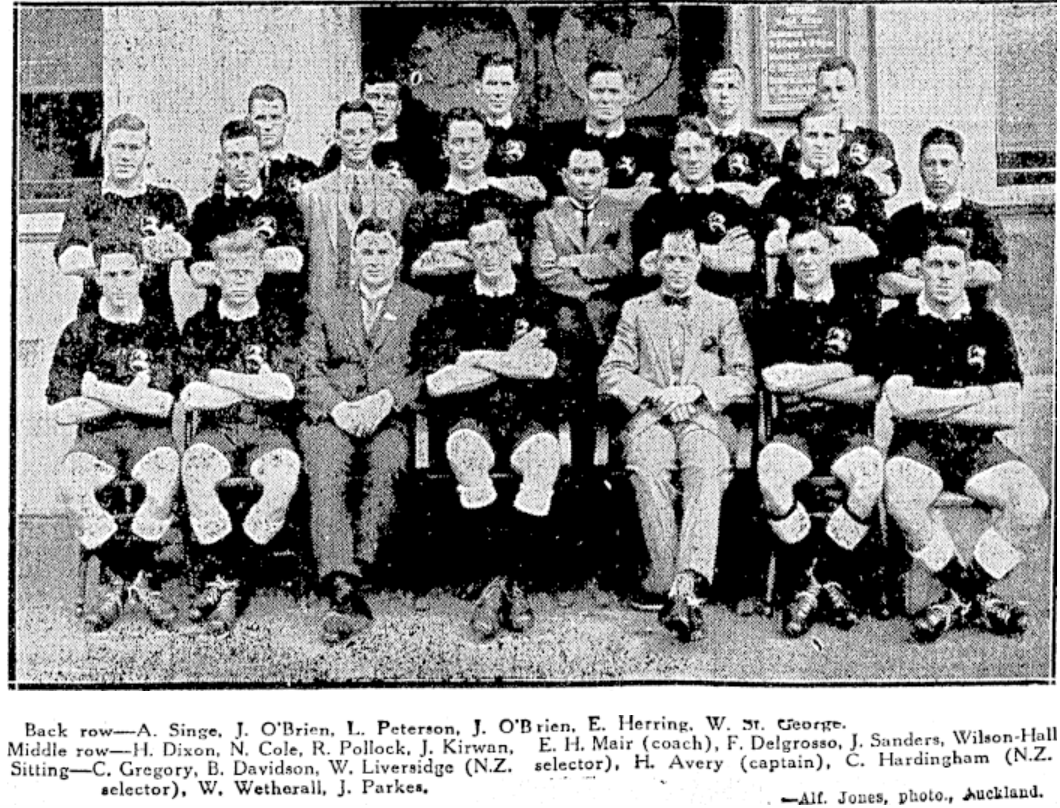

In 1925, Dixon was selected for New Zealand, becoming Kiwi #168. The squad toured Australia, however no test matches were played on tour.

Dixon represented Auckland in 1927 on their tour of the country. They defeated Canterbury, West Coast-Buller, Otago and Wellington before losing the Northern Union Cup to South Auckland.

== Later years ==
He married the famous New Zealand swimmer Piri Page on 22 March 1930. He died on 7 March 1978.
