= Alf Townsend =

New Zealand international rugby league footballer

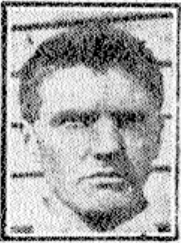

Personal information
- Full name: Alfred Charles Townsend
- Born: 23 January 1900 Auckland, New Zealand
- Died: 26 September 1973 (aged 73) Auckland, New Zealand

Playing information
- Weight: 82.5 kg (13 st 0 lb)
- Position: Hooker
Club
Years	Team	Pld	T	G	FG	P
1920–27	City Rovers (ARL)	82	21	3	0	69
1927–33	City (Otago)	60	17	1	0	53
1932	Athletic (Otago)	1	0	0	0	0
1933	Pacific	1	1	0	0	3
1933–34	Athletic (Otago)	15	2	0	0	6
	Total	159	41	4	0	131
Representative
Years	Team	Pld	T	G	FG	P
1921–26	Auckland	10	0	0	0	0
1925	North Island	1	0	0	0	0
1925	New Zealand XIII	1	0	0	0	0
1927–29	Otago	10	2	0	0	6
1928	NZ Possibles	1	1	0	0	3
1928	New Zealand	1	0	0	0	0
1928–31	South Island	4	1	0	0	3

Alfred Charles Townsend (23 January 1900 – 26 September 1973) was a New Zealand rugby league footballer who played in the 1920s. He played for New Zealand in 1928, as a Hooker during the era of contested scrums.

== Playing career ==
Townsend originally played for the City Rovers in the Auckland Rugby League competition. He debuted in their team in a Roope Rooster game against Newton Rangers on September 12, 1920. In 1921 he represented Auckland in a match with Canterbury in Christchurch. He later represented the North Island in 1925.

Midway through the 1927 season he moved to Otago for work reasons and joined the City Rugby League Club there. He represented Otago between 1926 and 1929. He also represented the South Island, thus becoming one of the few New Zealand league players to have played for both islands. In 1928 he represented New Zealand against Great Britain, in the 3rd test which New Zealand lost 6-5 in Christchurch becoming Kiwi #199. He had been in the reserves in the 1st and 2nd tests.

He continued to play off and on for City until 1932 as he was also refereeing a lot of senior matches, firstly in 1930 when he had been injured in the South Island v North Island fixture and was recovering, then again in 1932. On one occasion in the 1932 season he arrived at the Athletic v Christian Brothers match to find Athletic with only 9 players. He and a "surplus" Christian Brothers player took the field for Athletic who were unsurprisingly thrashed, conceding over 50 points.

In the 1933 season he played 2 matches for City at the beginning of the season in April before playing 1 match for Pacific in June and then transferring to Athletic where he played a few matches before seasons end.

== Personal life ==
In 1927 he married Eileen Jessie May Morris Townsend and in the same year they had a son, Trevor Alfred Townsend. They later moved back to Onehunga, Auckland where they lived from the 1940s to his death on 25 September 1973. He was buried in Meadowbank, Auckland.
