= Akarana Rugby League Football Club =

Defunct NZ rugby league club, based in Auckland

Club information
- Full name: Akarana Rugby League Football Club
- Short name: Akarana
- Colours: White jerseys, black shorts and socks
- Founded: 1926
- Exited: 1935

Former details
- Ground: Auckland Domain
- Competition: Auckland Rugby League

Records
- 4th grade Championship: 1926
- 5th Grade KO: 1927
- 6th Grade KO: 1926

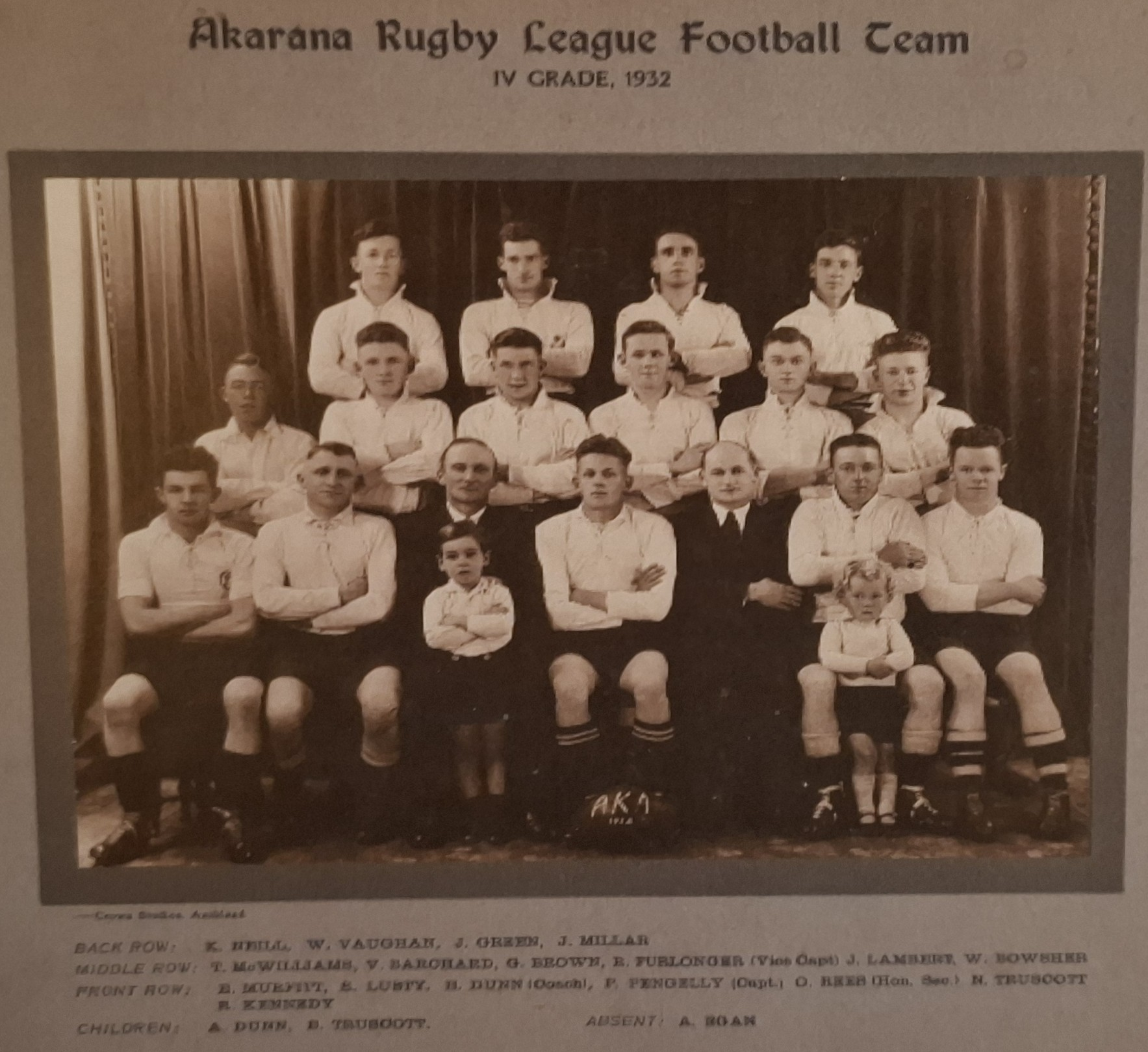
The Akarana 4th Grade team in 1932 which won the knockout competition.

Akarana League Football Club were a rugby league club in Auckland. They competed from 1926 until 1935. They did not represent any specific part of Auckland though they were broadly based in the Grafton area where they had an administrative headquarters and would meet there to travel to away games, while they trained at the nearby Auckland Domain.

== History ==
=== 1926 (6A and 6B teams) ===
The first entry of the Akarana club in Auckland Rugby League competitions was at the beginning of the 1926 season. They entered two teams, each in the 6th Grade with one in the A Section and one in the B Section. The team in the A Section recorded seven wins and three losses to finish third in their grade though results were often not reported so it is unofficial. They did however win the knockout competition at the end of the year. Their first ever match was against Northcote & Birkenhead Ramblers at 2pm on May 1 at Northcote with the referee Mr. Paice. Akarana won 6 points to 5. Their B Section team on the same day played Grafton Athletic on the Outer Domain 1t 1pm with the referee, Mr. Menzies. The score for this match was unreported. The B Section team finished 4th of 5 with 2 wins and 3 losses reported. The day before the game the two sides were named in the New Zealand Herald. The 6th A team was Taylor, Stanaway, Trott, Browne, Riddell, O’Donnell, Peachey, Boyle, Hunter, Satherley, Green, Price, Nadin, Shepherd, Keasing, Beattie, and Matthews. While the 6th B team was Burdett, Cross, Callagher, Maurice, Dufty (2), Dennehy, Davis, Munce, McPherson, Watson, Anderson, Nolan, Zaninovich, Clark, and Shellam. The A team beat City Rovers who had won the championship 10-8 in the knockout final on October 16.

=== 1927 (3 Teams) ===
The 1927 season saw an increase of one side. Akarana again entered an A and B team in the 6th Grade competition but they added a 5th Grade side. The 5th Grade side won the championship (Endean Shield). The results each week were not well reported with five missing, but they were recorded as winning seven games, drawing one, and having one loss. They also beat City Rovers 7-3 on October 15 to win the knockout competition. The team for the knockout final was Meehan, Alderton, Zaninovich, Lusty, Peachy, Doidge, Green, O’Donnell, Hunter, Holton, Jenkinson, Beattie, McKeown, and Moore. The Sun newspaper said that Alderton kicked a penalty after halftime and then they later scored a try and kicked another goal.

The 6th Grade A team also won their championship when they beat Grafton Athletic 11-5 in the final on August 27 to win the banner. The team for the final was: Keesing, Shepherd, Trott, Munce, Peterson, McCaulley, Pollock, Ralph, McWilliams, Harris, Truscott, Stanaway, Hodge, Clarke, Ginders, and Shellam. The Stanaway who was playing was the son of Jack Stanaway who was playing seniors for City Rovers and was a once time champion hurdler of New Zealand. His uncle was Alex Stanaway who played rugby league for New Zealand in 1911.

Their B team finished about 4th of 7 with 4 wins, a draw, 5 losses, and 5 unknown results. The team for their May 7 game was Kendall, Gallagher, Zaninovich, Nolan, Andrews, Trott, Shepherd, Anderson, Ferris, Pengelly, McWilliams, and Cross.

The 6th Grade A team played curtain-raiser to the Auckland v New Zealand game at Carlaw Park on April 30 at 1:30pm. City won the match 15-5 with the Herald writing “the curtain raiser was provided by the Akarana and City Sixth A Grade teams, and after a fast and open game victory rested with the latter by fifteen points to five. Akarana made strenuous attempts in the dying stages to pull the game out of the fire, and lack of finish only kept them from penetrating the defence”.

=== 1928 (4 Teams) ===
The Akarana club held their annual meeting on March 18 at 10am at Carlaw Park. Mr. W. Simpson presided over “a large attendance of members”. It was reported that “the balance sheet showed the club to be in a good financial position, and that the past season had been a very successful one”. The election of officers saw the following:- Patron, Mr. H.R. McKenzie; vice-patron, Mr. W.J. Hammill; president, Mr. A. Meehan; delegate to J.M.C., Mr. A McWilliams; hon. Secretary and treasurer, Mr. O. Rees; assistant secretary, Mr. W.J. Trott; club captain, Mr. Frank Hayward. Frank Hayward was the founder of the club and was also a caretaker at Carlaw Park. He was a professional runner in his younger years and trained George Davidson who ran for New Zealand in the Olympics, and his brothers Ben and Bill who both represented New Zealand at rugby league.

Akarana fielded four teams for the 1928 season. They were all in the lower grades; 4th, 5th, and two 6th Grade teams. The 4th grade side finished in the top 3 of 10 teams, with 9 reported wins, a draw, and 3 losses, scoring 158 points and only conceding 25. They also made the final of the knockout competition, losing to Richmond 13-8 on October 13. Akarana had defeated City 11-3 in their semi final. The 4th Grade team for their 12th of May match was Keesing, Birch, Taylor, Jenkinson, Currie, McCauley, F.W. Smith, O. Connell, Stone, I. Ginders, Green, Doidge, Zanovich, King, McWilliams, Truscott, M.F. Marn, M. Mar, T. Boyle, and McKay. In their 10-0 win over Ellerslie United at Ellerslie on May 19, F.W. Smith was taken to hospital after suffering from concussion but was later able to return home. For the same newspaper the Sun newspaper reported that “at two o’clock the local lads met Akarana in the fourth grade competition, and although Akarana won fairly easily at the finish, a real good game was witnessed”.

It was reported on August 14 that the Akarana 4th grade side had been granted permission by the Auckland Rugby League to travel to Christchurch to play the curtain-raiser to the New Zealand v England test match on August 25. The weather was “gloriously fine” at English Park in Christchurch with their opponents being the Canterbury 4th grade representative team. The Star (Christchurch) newspaper wrote “the Canterbury fourth grade representatives played the Akarana team from Auckland as the first curtain-raiser. Akarana did most of the attacking in the first spell, but were unable to pierce a sound defence. The Canterbury backs were prominent for one fine rush, which broke down just short of the line. The spell ended with no score. After a good Canterbury forward rush in the latter half of the second spell, Hurrell scored in the corner. The kick failed. Akarana made desperate but unsuccessful efforts to score” but the local side won 3-0. In their October 13 knockout semi final loss the Auckland Star wrote that “early spectators at the park were roused by a fine game between the fourth graders, Richmond and Akarana, for their grade knockout. Fine forward work and passing movements were a feature. Richmond, who have shown consistency throughout the season, and previously captured the championship, won by 13 to 8, but on the whole, were lucky in this contest. Akarana pressed strongly towards the end, and their goal kicker missed a number of good opportunities”. The Christchurch Press on the match said that the game “was not very spectacular, as defence of both sides was too strong for the attack”. And that “in the first spell, in which no points were scored, Akarana had easily the better of the game territorially, Alderton, the visiting halfback, putting in some good work… In the second spell the visitors assumed the offensive for the greater part” but were unable to break the defence. It as noted by the Junior Advisory Board of Canterbury Rugby League on September 4 that they had received a letter from the Akarana club thanking them for their reception.

Their 5th grade team won the championship (Endean Shield) by a clear six points from Devonport United. They went undefeated winning all 11 games, scoring 266 points and only conceding 11. However they lost in the knockout competition to Richmond, 5-0 on September 1. Their side for their 12 May match with Richmond which they won 21-0 was; Meehan, Alderton, Lusty, Peachey, O’Donnell, Stanaway, McKeown, Hunter, Harris, A. Hunter, T. Keown, Munce, S. Ninkie, Swinton, Moore, Peterson, and O. Cross”. The Sun wrote on June 6, that “Munce, who plays on the wing for Akarana fifths, has scored no fewer than 14 tries in the last three games. This team has registered 128 points without having a single one put up against them. Struth!”.

The 6th Grade side finished mid table winning 6, drawing 2, and having 4 losses. On June 9 they played Marist in a curtain raiser at Carlaw Park. The newspapers reported “as a good example of the rabble a football match can degenerate into at times, the clash on No. 2 ground was a good example. Marist sixth-graders were playing Akarana, and eventually triumphed to the tune of 8 points to 7. The referee appeared to be a minor adornment, and could only control the game by making his siren heard above the babble of voices. Members of both sides were to be heard frequently inciting their comrades to “put in the dirt”, and altogether the display was a disgrace to the code and to the interests of rugby league, such displays should be stamped out, especially among younger players”. In more positive reporting they said that the wing three quarter, McIver, was one of the Akarana club’s latest finding, though he was soon to leave Auckland. He was an ex-Otago player “who has been marked as an invincible in his team. He will be much missed among both Akarana leaguers and supporters”.

Their 6th A Grade team finished 5th out of 10 teams. They had 6 wins, 2 draws, and 4 losses, scoring 99 points and conceding 35. While the team in the 6th Grade B (Myers Cup) section only registered 3 wins, a draw, and 8 losses to finish 6th out of 8 teams.

=== 1929 (4 Teams) ===
The 1929 season saw Akarana once again field four teams. They were in the 3rd Intermediate Grade, 4th Grade, 5th Grade, and 6th A Grade. They held their annual meeting at Carlaw Park on Sunday, March 24 which was advertised by O. Rees their honorary secretary and treasurer. The well known running coach Frank “Rangi” Hayward was named their club captain. He had been one of the founders of the club. Mr. R. Ninkie presided over the meeting which showed a balance-sheet of £30 3s 5d in cash and assets. It was also mentioned by Ninkie that the club had spent £49 in its three years of existence on gear, while each year the club had sent a team on tour which the club fully funded with the most recent to Christchurch being the “most ambitious”. The cost of that trip had been £115 which had been fully paid for through fund raising from social functions throughout the season. The officers chosen for the season were: President, Mr. H. Frost; delegate to J.M.C., Mr. R. Ninkie; club captain, Mr. Frank Hayward; hon. Secretary and treasurer, Mr. O. Rees.

The 3rd Intermediate team finished second in the championship behind Devonport United (North Shore Albions) with 10 wins and 3 losses scoring 191 points and conceding 40. They lost the knockout semi final to Newmarket 12-2. The 4th Grade team finished mid table in the championship with 8 wins, 2 draws, and 5 losses. They lost their knockout semi final to Devonport by 6-0. Their 5th Grade side won 3 matches, with a draw, and 7 losses to finish 5th of 8 teams. While their 6th A Grade side withdrew from the competition after suffering 4 defeats to start the season, scoring just 4 points and conceding 44.

The Parnell School team was also affiliated to the Akarana Club and its name was Parnell and Akarana interchangeably. They won 8 games, drew 2, and lost 5 to finish 3rd of 11 teams. The teams to play in the opening weekend were – Third Grade: Taylor, Peterson, Zane-Zaninovich, McCauley, Browne, Stone, Beatty, Cox, Doidge, Ginders, Cutfield, Boyle, Keesing, Watson, and Jenkinson; Fourth Grade: Peacy, Williams, Meehan, Munce, Hunter, Schrodin, O’Connell, Gillam, Ninkie, Kauhou, Lusty, Stanaway, Alderton, Swinton, O’Donnell, and Wilkins; Fifth Grade: Conchie, Naden, Tucker, Egan, Robinson, Bloomfield, Truscott, Thurlow, Kildare, Barnes, Pengelly, Furlonger, Smith, Gallagher, Crew, and Egan; Sixth Grade A: Barefoot, Bowsher, Davis, Smith, Hearn, Smith, Monks, McWilliams, Meehan, Anderson, Anderson, Zane-Zanninovich, Hobman, Ireland, Cooper, and Killun (2). It was reported in mid July that the Akarana 3rd Grade team had been unlucky with injuries with a large number of players “on the injured list at various times, and nearly every Saturday it has taken the field with either one or two short”. They had been missing their captain, R. Taylor who had injured his knee a month earlier but was expected to return to the field for their game with Kingsland Athletic. Describing a July 13 game between the 4th Grade side and Kingsland The Sun newspaper said it was “one of the most interesting junior games” of the season and “in the thick of the mud and slush both sides battled hard to cross the line, but failed and the game ended with no score”. The same article also wrote of their full back, O’Donnell saying he was a “crack” player, “possibly the best in the grade”. He had started on the wing but during the game went into the scrum, “and Truscott, who made a good showing, came out to take his place. Ninkie was strong at centre, while Alberton and Stanaway combined well at five eighths. Lusty (hooker), Peachy, Williams and Kauhu were the pick of the forwards”. It was also remarked that it was “a toss up between two for the best hooker in the fourth grade. Lusty of Akarana and McDonald of Richmond. In September the Sun reported that the 4th Grade side had won the knockout competition however it was in fact one of the early round games. They beat Kingsland 8-3 as a curtain-raiser to the Marist v Ponsonby Roope Rooster final. The game “was played in lively style, but remained for some time about centre-field. Both Akarana’s forward and rearguard play worried the Kingslanders a good deal. The Akarana pack dribbled the ball through with Munns on the wing scoring. Late in the game Munns who “was the star player on the field” secured the ball “and cut in and beat half a dozen men before going over for a good try” which Alderton converted. Weeks later on the 12th of October the 4th Grade team played Devonport in the knockout semi final and lost 6-0. The game was one of the curtain-raisers to the Marist v South Sydney tour match.

For their primary school side one of their players, Neil, was selected in a trial game to choose the Auckland Schoolboy team in late August. On November 2 Auckland Rugby League held their annual schoolboys day at Carlaw Park. A knockout tournament was played with Akarana beating Richmond 3-0 in round 1, and losing to Māngere United 9-8. They failed to place in the seven team relay race.

=== 1930 (4 teams) ===
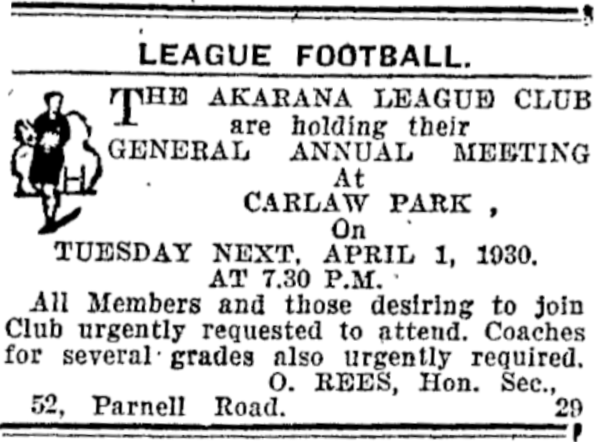

In 1930 Akarana/Parnell fielded four sides. They were in 3rd Grade Intermediate, 4th Grade, 5th Grade, and the Schoolboy competition. The year formally began for the club on Tuesday, April 1 at Carlaw Park when they held their annual general meeting there. Their honorary secretary was once again O. Rees. An advertisement for the meeting said that “all members and those desiring to join club urgently requested to attend. Coaches for several grades also urgently required”. Details of the meeting showed that there was a “record attendance” present for the Akarana club with Mr. S Davis presiding. The annual report and balance sheet showed that the club was “in a sound financial position”, with assets totalling £16 12s 11d. They elected officers to fill the following positions: Patron, the Hon. James Bell Donald, vice-patron, Mr. F. Brown; president, Mr. P. Barry; delegate to junior committee, Mr. R. Ninkie; club captain, Mr. H.C. Reynolds; hon. Secretary and treasurer, Mr. O. Rees, E.J. Osbourne, J.H. Meehan, J. Pound, W. Hoare, J. Redward, W. Pengelly, W.J. Harris, W.J. Harris, jun., L.H. Heard, and H.M. Fraser. In early April with teams beginning their pre-season training it was reported that one of their players, Arthur Hunt, injured his shoulder and had to be taken to hospital for attention.

The 3rd Grade Intermediate side finished the season with 6 wins, 1 draw, and 5 losses from their 12 games to end in a mid table position. The 4th Grade side had 14 wins, 3 draws, and 4 losses to finish second behind Richmond in the championship. Their 5th Grade team finished mid table with 6 wins and 8 losses. The schoolboys team was the best performing side in the club, winning at least 9 games and losing only 2 with several scores not reported meaning they finished approximately second in an 18 team competition. They were recorded as scoring 130 points and only conceding 17 from the known scores. The side won Section A of the competition and had to play off with the Richmond Schools side to decide the winner of the championship. They were defeated 11-8 on September 20 to finish runner up.

The club was boosted by the transfer of S Beattie from Newton Rangers. He had played 13 games for their senior side in 1930. In a loss for the club, fullback R. O’Donnell transferred to North Shore Albions where he went on to play 71 games for their senior sides from 1930 to 1935. They also lost two other players to their partner club, Parnell with the players moving in to their Senior B side. They were George Munce and Robert Alderton. In early May, D. Watson transferred from Akarana to Parnell as well. And then in mid May, H. Wilkins transferred from Akarana to Northcote.

The 4th and 5th Grade team lists were published for the May 31 games. The 4th Grade side was: Lusty (captain), Peachy, Adams, Best, O’Connell, Hunter, Kauhau, Furlonger, Truscott, Renker, Mellows, Hutt, Robinson, Schollum, Milburn, Flanagan, and McKay, while the 5th Grade side was: Pengelly (captain), Herne, Howie, Thurlow, Nadin, Egan, Monks, Kendell, Meehan, McWilliams, Murfitt, Gallagher, Shepherd, Drom, Smith, O’Brien, Nolan, and Hills. The 5th Grade side had some comments on their game with Otahuhu Rovers. Akarana lost 13-0 though “McWilliams at fullback played a safe game, while Egan was the most noticeable of the others”. In mid June all of their four sides were published in the newspapers with the 3rd Intermediate side being Keesing, Cox, Browne (2), Zane-Zaninovich, Vrovos, Doidge, Currie, Craze, Henderson, Jenkinson, Peterson, Warboys, Monks, Travis, Stanaway, Cleverly, Haining, and Stanaway. The schoolboys team named was Hawkes, Cleave, Nixon, J. Brown, L. Brown, Fitley, G. Brown, Thompson, Neil, Cameron, McWilliams, Curtis, Grant, Barfoot, Best, and Daniels.

On the 13th of September their 4th Grade side had a 65-0 win over Glen Lynn in the knockout competition. On October 4 the 4th Grade side met Richmond. They drew 2-2 in heavy rain in a curtain-raiser on the Carlaw Park #1 field. The fullbacks Valentine and Kouhu “were prominent, and Lusty, the Akarana hooker, was the best of the two sets of forwards. Desperate battling tired both teams towards the finish”.

In late September the Auckland Primary Schools held a trial match as a curtain raiser to the Stormont Shield play in match at Carlaw Park. In the A Team was Neil at five eighths from the Akarana Schoolboys side and Stewart in the forwards. In the B Team to oppose them was Hawkes on the wing and McLean in the forwards. The reserves for both sides featured Hammond of Akarana as well. Another Schoolboys trial game was also being played between Possible and Probable teams with Titley and Brown in the former, and Griffen and Daniel in the later. On October 11 the Primary School Representative Teams played an exhibition curtain-raiser in Papakura at the Railway Reserve (now Massey Park). In the A team was Neil and Hawkes and in the B Team was Stewart of the Akarana Schoolboy side. The A team beat the B team 14-2 and the matches were the first time rugby league had been played in the area with Neil scoring one of the A Teams tries.

At the conclusion of the season Akarana held a reunion at the Tiffen Tearooms on October 16, a Thursday evening to close the 1930 season. There were “about 100 members and friends present”. The president of the club, Mr. P. Barry presided, while Mr. T. Davis, secretary of the Auckland junior management committee, represented Auckland Rugby League, and Mr. John Stormont the Referees Association. It was said that “an excellent programme was arranged by the club secretary, Mr. Ophir Rees, and the following artists assisted:- Messrs. C. Meldrum, J. McMinn, A. Auston, G. Manson, G. Swan, Elton Black, Lou Bickerton, O. Rees, T. Cooper, C. Massee, W. Harris and the Harmony Five. Mr. W. Purcell was the accompanist throughout a very enjoyable evening”.

=== 1931 (4 Teams) ===
Akarana held their annual meeting on April 9 at 7:30pm at the Carlaw Park meeting rooms. On April 23 they held another meeting this time at the League Rooms. Once again Akarana entered 4 teams in Auckland Rugby League competitions for the 1931 season. They were in the 3rd Intermediate, 4th Grade, 6th Grade, and Schoolboys grades. The 3rd Intermediate team finished second with 8 wins, 2 draws and 1 loss from their 11 known results. They beat City Rovers in a knockout semi final 10-4 before losing the knockout final to Richmond Rovers 6-3 on September 12. The 4th Grade side also finished second, winning 10 games, drawing 1 and losing 3.

The club published the list of their players for their May 2 games. In the 6th Grade A team was Neil, Stewart, Hawkes, Killeen, Camplin, Combes, J. McDonald, Daniels, L. McDonald, Killeem, Hunt, and Cleave. The 4th Grade A team was Thurlow, Pengelly, Hearn, Furlonger, Murfitt, Hunter, H. Smith, Maxwell, Egan, Schollum, Green, Combes, Lusty, O’Connell, Adams, Truscott, J. Robinson, and Anderson. And the 3rd Grade Intermediate team was Moore, Heaps, Tennants, Silva, Zane-Zaninovich, Kauhoa, Black, Barfoot, Best, Whittle, Jack Stanaway, R. Brown, Ferran, Robinson, C. Peterson, Travis, Manning, Haming, and Cleverly.

The 3rd Intermediate side was asked to explain themselves “regarding the attitude of its players toward the referee before and during the Outer Domain match” that they played on the previous Saturday (8 July). They lost to Richmond 8-0 in a top of the table clash with Owen Chalmers the referee. At the end of the season one of their 3rd Grade players, Jack Stanaway transferred to City Rovers. He was the son of Jack Stanaway (also known as Hone Haira) who had played for New Zealand Māori in 8 games in 1908 and later refereed club games in Auckland and an international in 1911 between the touring Great Britain side and New Zealand.

The 6th Grade side finished near the bottom of the table, winning 2 and losing 10 of their known results. They were struggling for numbers early in the season and placed a notice in the newspaper asking potential players to apply to the secretary at that nights practice on April 28. While the Schoolboy team only had 4 results reported which were a win, draw and 2 losses. In early May J.C. Craies transferred from Akarana to Newton Rangers.

It was reported in late May that Robert Alderton, a former Akarana junior was playing well for City Rovers senior side. He went on to play 16 games for their senior side over the next 3 seasons. On June 13 the Franklin Times wrote a piece on the 4th Grade game between Papakura and Akarana at Westfield “on a very slippery field”. The game was described as “brilliant” despite the conditions. Akarana wore white while Papakura wore red. In the first half “Hunter pounced on the ball and was awarded a try” to make the score 3-3. Soon after “Schollum kicked, ran and dived, the local linesman being overruled and the above player awarded a try. Pengelly missed a difficult kick”. The second half was evenly contested but Akarana held on to win 6-3.

=== 1932 (4 Teams) ===
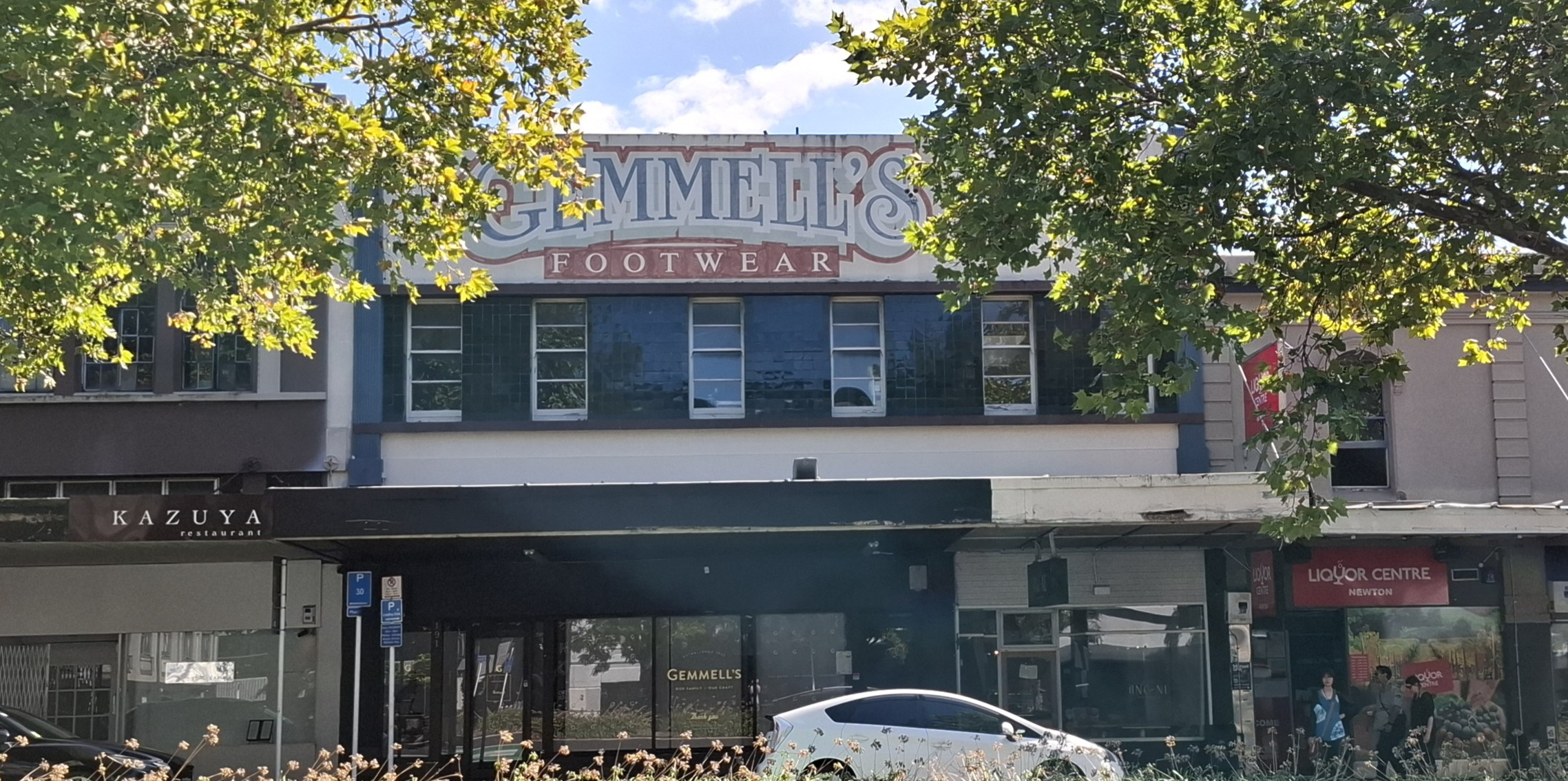
187 Symonds Street, where the team would meet before away games and also administrative functions were often performed.

Yet again Akarana field 4 teams. However they were now fielding a 3rd Grade Open side for the first time and were not fielding a team in the Schoolboys grade. On April 19 the club published a notice in the Auckland Star stating that players were wanted in 3rd Open, 3rd Intermediate, and 4th, and 5th Grades. They were to apply at 187 Symonds Street on Wednesday at 7.30pm. On April 23 they posted a notice in the New Zealand Herald asking “all players assemble, practice, 2pm., League Ground, Domain, today (Saturday)”.

The 3rd Grade Open side had 3 recorded wins and 7 losses to finish in the bottom half of the standings. The 3rd Intermediate team did not have any recorded wins and their only known points were from a draw to go with 9 losses. On June 11 they beat Papakura 5-0 despite only having 10 men. As the game kicked off at 2.25 instead of the 1.45 scheduled time the game was played with short halves. Akarana kicked a goal in the first half and led 2-0 at the break. Then “near the end of the game Akarana secured from a scrum, their backs got going and raced over near the corner”. In notes on the game from the Franklin Times they said that “Akarana played three men in the scrum yet they won 12 scrums to Papakura’s five. An appeal by one of the visitors’ backs to the forwards when in a scrum, to “use their weight” provoked amusement on the sideline. The best performing team in the club this season was the 4th Grade side which won 11 games, drew 1, and lost 2 to finish runner up behind Point Chevalier by just 1 competition point. For their May 21 game against Point Chevalier at Walker Park in Point Chevalier the team was asked to meet at Grafton Bridge at 2pm for a 3pm kick off indicating that their team was largely based in central Auckland. On June 11 Papakura beat Akarana 3-2 at Westfield however they fielded two ineligible players so the match was ultimately awarded to Akarana. After trailing 3-0 at half time “Akarana opened the second spell with determination but the reds’ defence was sound… whilst play was in Papakura territory Jackson potted a good goal, making the score 3-2.” This caused play to “now brighten up, both sides making strenuous efforts to score. However, the defence held and the whistle blew with Papakura the winners by a point”. In late June the Marist Old Boys club appealed the Junior Board’s decision in dismissing their protest against the Akarana 4th Grade’s side. They had alleged that Vic Barchard of Akarana did not have clearance from Marist. However the secretary of the Junior Board produced a clearance signed by the Marist secretary a week before the match in which he played and therefore the appeal was dismissed. Barchard went on to play 44 games for the Marist seniors from 1939 to 1942. He was the brother of Len Barchard who played for New Zealand in 1930 and Victor’s son Des Barchard played for New Zealand from 1947 to 1952. The 4th Grade side won the knockout competition when they beat Papakura on September 24. The 5th Grade side struggled winning 1 game, drawing 3, and losing 5 of their reported results.

=== 1933 (3 Teams) ===
In 1933 the club saw a reduction of teams by one. They were unable to field a 3rd Grade Open side but had teams in the 3rd Grade Intermediate, 4th Grade, and 5th Grade competitions. On April 4 the club put a notice in the Auckland Star saying “players wanted all grades, Akarana Club; 7.30, Thursday, 187 Symonds Street”. The site is the current day Gemmell’s Footwear building. On April 22 they advertised a practice for all “members, [and] intending players” at 2pm at the Auckland Domain.

The 3rd Grade Intermediate team played 15 games but only registered 1 win and 1 draw, with 10 losses and 3 unknown results to finish second to last. The 4th Grade side had 3 wins, 2 draws and 9 losses and finished in the lower half of the standings, while the 5th Grade side played 14 games and lost at least 10 of them with no reported wins to finish equal last with New Lynn and Ellerslie United. Before the start of the season P. Kahu of the Akarana club was granted a transfer to the Newton Rangers where he would join their Senior B side. They did however acquire C.R. Bailey in early May, James De Grey in mid May from Ellerslie, along with L. Vail from Marist Old Boys, and a week later Hector Alcock joined from Ellerslie.

At the June 6 Junior Management meeting it was decided that the Akarana 5th Grade side would lose competition points due to fielding an unregistered player. The match in question was on May 27 and saw Ellerslie win 36-6. The Ellerslie club appealed the decision and it was referred by the junior management committee to the Auckland League. Each team had played a boy over the allowed weight.

In an 8-0 loss to City Rovers at Onehunga on June 10 the 3rd Grade Intermediate side had two players injured. J. Howley fractured his thumb, and R. Stephens suffered back injuries. Then on June 15 the same side suffered another injury when they lost 15-2 to Papakura at Papakura. Edward James Lambert, aged 21 was concussed in the loss though it was not stated what happened to him. On June 19 the Franklin Times wrote a match description for the local Papakura sides 15-2 win over Akarana 3rd Intermediate. There was “a good crowd of spectators” and the match “was evenly contested and was remarkable for the number of penalties given… Akarana did not combine and was unimpressive to such a degree that the result was never in doubt”. The Akarana 5th Grade side suffered a heavy 40-2 loss on the same afternoon at the same venue. The Burgess brothers, Bob, Dick, and Athol scored 28 of Papakura’s points and would go on to play for their senior side in the Fox Memorial competition in the late 1930’s. Akarana’s only points came when they carried the ball to the “red’s quarter” for the first time in the second half and kicked a penalty goal. At this point of the season 23 year old Revel Armstrong Travis transferred from Akarana to Ngaruawahia. On August 26 a Manukau player was ruled to be not in order in their match with Akarana’s 3rd Intermediate side so Akarana was awarded the win which was their only of the season. On September 2 the 3rd Grade Intermediate team played Papakura at the Auckland Domain and lost 5-3. The Franklin Times wrote that “the game was not up so standard and the final score in favour of Papakura was indeed a lucky one. Their opponents took the field in a variety of jerseys, representing City, Richmond, Otahuhu, in addition to a few of their own”. They went on to say that “the indifferent display of the local team [Akarana] may be attributed to the fact that several players were not available and it was with some difficulty that a 13 was mustered. Watson, the local star three-quarter, was missed as also were Hammond, Smith, Bremner, and Healey. Clarke and Ashby played their first games this season and Bell filled a vacancy – his first game for several weeks”. At the conclusion of the season the Davis Cup points were announced for competition points across all grades with Akarana scoring 25 meaning they were tied with Mount Albert in 13th place from 18 clubs in Auckland.

=== 1934 (2 Teams) ===
Once again the new season saw a reduction in teams with 1934 seeing 2 teams, down from the 3 of 1933 season. They had a 3rd Open Grade team competing for the Monteith Shield. They finished 5th out of 7 sides with a 4 win, 7 loss record, scoring 47 points and conceding 93. Their 3rd Intermediate Grade side had just 4 wins and a draw to go with 17 losses in the Walker Cup. They finished 10th of 13 and scored 56 points while conceding 214.

On May 1 the 3rd Intermediate team advertised for four players asking them to meet at the Grandstand of the Auckland Domain. Like recent seasons many players were transferring out of the club as their team numbers reduced. Days later William Pengelly transferred from Akarana to Ponsonby reserves. On May 8 A. Mann, J. Miller, W. White, R. Furlonger, and W. Bowsher all transferred to the Mount Albert United club. Confusingly the players were said to be surplus to requirements. Pengelly returned to Akarana after having not “been played three matches”. This meant he was allowed to revert to his previous club, joining him were A.E. Jenkinson, R. Alderton, and S. Connor who had transferred to City at the same time. The club advised that they now had sufficient numbers to enter sides in 3rd Open and 3rd Intermediate. The later side had been declared “out of order” the previous Saturday and forfeited championship points. Other moves were G.R. Eccles transferring from Akarana to Devonport United while J. Patterson came to Akarana from Richmond Rovers and joined their 3rd Intermediate side. Pengelley later moved back to Ponsonby and eventually played one senior game for them in 1936 when he scored a try in the Phelan Shield final.

At the end of May, Leo Davis transferred to Akarana 3rd Open side. He later went on to play for the Richmond senior side where he was one of the best forwards in Auckland for several years. In 1936 he debuted for their senior side and went on to play a decade for them, playing over 120 games scoring 25 tries and he also played 4 games for Auckland from 1941 to 1943. In a match played by the 3rd Intermediate side which was covered by the Franklin Times on June 9 they were said to be “hopelessly outclassed”. The game was played at the Auckland Domain with Papakura winning 22-0. A week later on June 16 at Grey Lynn Park a 24 year old 3rd grade player named Anthony Howley suffered concussion and injured his ribs. He was taken to Auckland Hospital. In late June Akarana gained the services of George Munce, and K. Curey from the City Rovers senior squad. Munce had played 7 games for the senior side in 1930 and 1931. On August 26 D. O’Connell, T. Howley, Eugene Donovan, and F. Armishaw were regraded from the Akarana 3rd Open side to the 3rd Intermediate side. The following year Donovan moved to the City Rovers club and debuted for their senior side though he did not start to play for them regularly until the 1940s. Near the conclusion of a disappointing season for the club a 3rd Intermediate player was suspended for a week for “using offensive language on the field” in a 13-12 win over Richmond.

=== 1935 Final season (4 teams) ===
Ironically the 1935 season was to be the last for Akarana despite the fact that they were able to field two 3rd Grade sides, a 5th Grade side, and a Schoolboys side. The 3rd Grade A team finished in the lower half of the competition with 2 wins, 2 draws and 8 losses, while their B team lost 4 matches and then withdrew from the competition midway through the season. Their 5th Grade team won 6, drew 3, and lost 5 to finish mid table but only a handful of points from third. They also made the knockout (Milicich Cup) semi final where they lost to Ellerslie 11-0. Their Schoolboy side won 2 games and lost 8 with 8 other results not reported.

Like in previous seasons there was a lot of player movement too and from the Akarana club with several regrades as well due to the growth in teams. At the Junior Management meeting on May 21 the Akarana club sent a complaint that “the City Rovers club had acquired four of its 3rd Grade players for the reserve seniors without due notice, with the result that Akarana was compelled to play its team short in the grade”. On July 13 Akarana beat Ellerslie but the result was overturned after a protest by Ellerslie where it was found that two of the Akarana players were over weight. On July 30 the club notified the league that they were claiming a one pound transfer fee from the City club who had acquired “Donovan” from them for their reserve team. This was likely Eugene Donovan though could have been his brother Phil.

=== 1936 Ending ===
At the beginning of the 1936 the Marist Old Boys (now Marist Saints) club placed an advertisement for their annual meeting which including a comment “all players, intending players, Akarana Boys and Supporters cordially invited”. The notice was placed by the Marist honorary secretary Jack Kirwan who had played for New Zealand 28 times from 1925 to 1927, and co-signed by P. Wheaton, the Akarana manager. In late May of 1941 it was reported that Rangi Hayward had died. He was a founding member of the Akarana club and after they ceased to exist he became involved with the younger City Rovers teams. As well as being heavily involved with rugby league he was a running coach and coached Olympian George Davidson early in his career and also his brothers Ben Davidson, and Bill Davidson who represented New Zealand at rugby league.

== Season records ==
=== Highest graded team in each season ===
Season	Grade	Name	Pld	W	D	L	PF	PA	PD	Pts	Position (Teams)
1926	6th A Grade	Akarana	12	7	0	3	108	42	+66	14	3rd of 7, Won the KO competition with a 10-8 win over City A
1927	5th Grade (Endean Shield)	Akarana	14	7	1	1	68	10	+58	15	1st of 6, Won the KO competition with a 7-3 win over City
1928	4th Grade (Hospital Cup)	Akarana	12	9	1	2	158	25	+133	19	3rd of 10
1929	3rd Intermediate	Akarana	13	10	0	3	191	40	+151	20	2nd of 8
1930	3rd Intermediate	Akarana-Parnell	12	6	1	5	100	68	+32	13	4th of 7
1931	3rd intermediate	Akarana	15	8	2	1	98	15	+83	18	2nd of 8
1932	3rd Open	Akarana	12	3	0	7	30	63	-33	6	5th of 7
1933	3rd Intermediate (Walker Cup)	Akarana	15	1	1	10	12	164	-152	3	9th of 10
1934	3rd Open (Monteith Shield)	Akarana	11	4	0	7	47	93	-46	8	5th of 7
1935	3rd Grade (Walker Cup)	Akarana	14	2	2	8	93	106	-13	6	8th of 14
1926-35	Total		130	57	8	47	905	626	+279	122	
