= 1927 Auckland Rugby League season =

Rugby league season

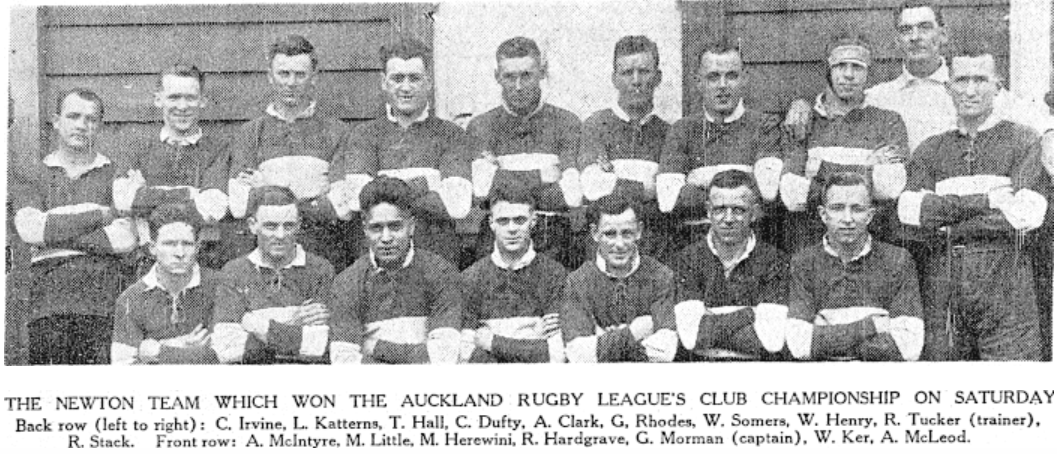

The 1927 Auckland Rugby League season was its 18th. Newton defeated Ponsonby by 6 points to 3 in the championship final to win the Monteith Shield after both teams finished the season tied with identical 8 win, 1 draw, 3 loss records. This was the second time Newton had won the championship in 18 efforts, with the first being in 1912 and was to be their last after they merged decades later with City Rovers and the combined team ceased in the early 2000s. Richmond won the Roope Rooster knockout trophy for the second consecutive season. Newton Rangers defeated Richmond to win the Stormont Shield.

Ellerslie won the Norton Cup by winning the second division competition, known as the B Grade at this time. They were undefeated and also won the Stallard Cup which was the B Grade knockout trophy. Interestingly the league played a 'promotion-relegation' match, with Ellerslie by virtue of winning the Norton Cup for winning the B Grade playing off with Grafton, who had finished last in the A Grade. Ellerslie won 11–3 over Grafton thus winning the right to compete in the A grade competition in the 1928 season. Despite this there was still considerable discussion at the annual general meeting the following year as to whether or not Ellerslie be admitted to the A Grade. It was eventually decided that they would be, with Grafton dropping to the B Grade.

Other trophies awarded (at the 1928 annual general meeting of the Auckland Rugby League) were the Davis Points Shield to Richmond, the Thistle Cup to Newton, and a special cup for the best forward to W.Clark from Newton.

Preceded by 1926	18th Auckland Rugby League season 1927	Succeeded by 1928

== Auckland rugby league news ==
=== Club teams by grade participation ===
Team	1st	B Div.	2nd	3rd Open	3rd Int.	4th	5th	6th A	6th B	Schools	Total
Richmond Rovers	1	0	1	0	2	1	1	1	1	1	9
Devonport United	1	0	1	1	1	1	0	1	1	0	7
Ponsonby United	1	0	1	1	0	2	1	0	0	0	6
City Rovers	1	0	1	0	1	0	1	1	1	0	6
Grafton Athletic	1	0	1	1	0	1	0	1	0	0	5
Kingsland Rovers	0	1	1	0	1	0	0	0	1	0	4
Point Chevalier	0	1	0	0	1	0	0	1	1	0	4
Marist Old Boys	1	0	1	0	0	0	0	0	1	0	3
Newton Rangers	1	0	0	0	1	0	1	0	0	0	3
Māngere United	0	1	1	1	0	0	0	0	0	0	3
Northcote & Birkenhead Ramblers	0	1	0	1	0	0	1	0	0	0	3
Ellerslie United	0	1	0	0	1	1	0	0	0	0	3
Akarana	0	0	0	0	0	0	1	1	1	0	3
Parnell	0	1	0	0	1	0	0	0	0	0	2
Otahuhu Rovers	0	1	0	0	0	0	0	0	0	1	2
Remuera	0	0	1	0	0	0	0	0	0	0	1
Glen Eden Rovers	0	0	0	1	0	0	0	0	0	0	1
New Lynn	0	0	0	1	0	0	0	0	0	0	1
Onehunga Convent	0	0	0	0	0	0	0	0	0	1	1
Onehunga Primary School	0	0	0	0	0	0	0	0	0	1	1
Newmarket Primary School	0	0	0	0	0	0	0	0	0	1	1
Papatoetoe Primary School	0	0	0	0	0	0	0	0	0	1	1
Total	7	7	9	7	9	7	6	6	7	6	70

=== Transfers ===
A McIntyre who had been playing in Sydney joined the Newton club.

=== Annual meetings of Auckland Rugby League ===
The annual report for the 1927 season stated that the total revenue for Auckland Rugby League was £5,597, with £4,216 taken at the gates. At the annual meeting of the Junior Management Committee of the Auckland Rugby League on 23 March it was stated in their report that junior players exceeded 1,500. It was also reported that the Remuera League Club was being revived. They had fielded two junior teams in 1914, and appeared to have the numbers to enter two junior teams in the 1927 season.

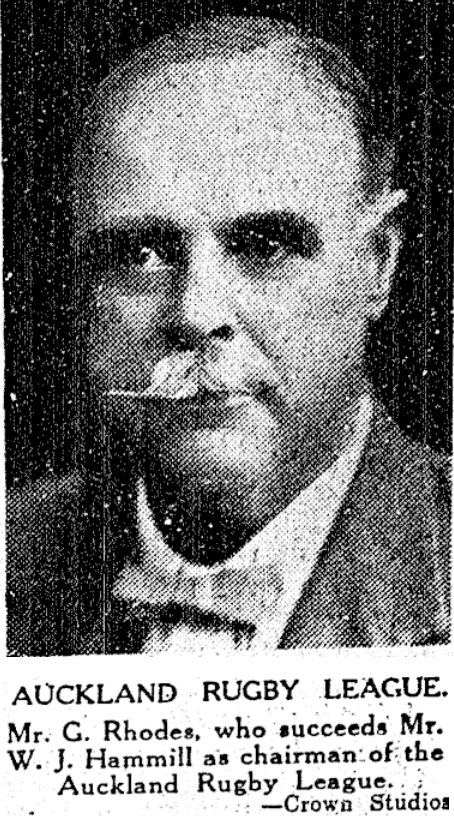

On 10 August the Auckland Rugby League Chairman, Mr. W.J. Hammill tendered his resignation for business reasons. He had occupied the position for five years. He was congratulated on his contribution to the game and made a life member of the League. Mr. George Rhodes was elected as the new chairman of the Management Committee.

=== Representative season ===
Auckland began the season with a match against the returning members of the New Zealand team that had toured England from August 1926 to January 1927. There was some controversy in that Joe Menzies had played for the 'New Zealand team' despite being from the South Auckland (Waikato) province and the New Zealand Rugby League questioned the Auckland Rugby League on the selection. One possible reason for his selection may have been the fact that Arthur Singe had been banned for life after going on strike during the tour along with 6 other players. This meant that there was one less Auckland forward to pick for the match. Auckland won the game 24–21. They went on a southern tour later in the season and played matches against Canterbury, West Coast, Otago, and Wellington. After their return to Auckland they played against Buller and South Auckland. The Buller side was coached by Bill Davidson who had spent many years playing for City Rovers, Auckland, and played for New Zealand from 1919 to 1921. He had later moved to the Canterbury region where he was involved in sporting administration. He later returned to Auckland and coached Ponsonby in the 1938 season. Auckland lost the Northern Union Challenge Cup to South Auckland in their final game of the season.

== Monteith Shield (first grade championship) ==
=== Monteith Shield standings ===
Team	Pld	W	D	L	F	A	Pts
Newton Rangers	13	10	1	2	190	128	21
Ponsonby United	13	9	1	3	190	111	19
Devonport United	12	7	0	5	207	114	14
Marist Old Boys	11	7	0	4	155	114	14
Richmond Rovers	12	4	1	7	137	140	9
City Rovers	11	3	1	7	134	182	7
Grafton Athletic	12	0	0	12	81	305	0

=== Monteith Shield results ===
After two completed rounds Newton and Ponsonby were both tied on 19 competition points. This necessitated a final between the two sides and this was won by Newton 6–3.

==== Round 1 ====
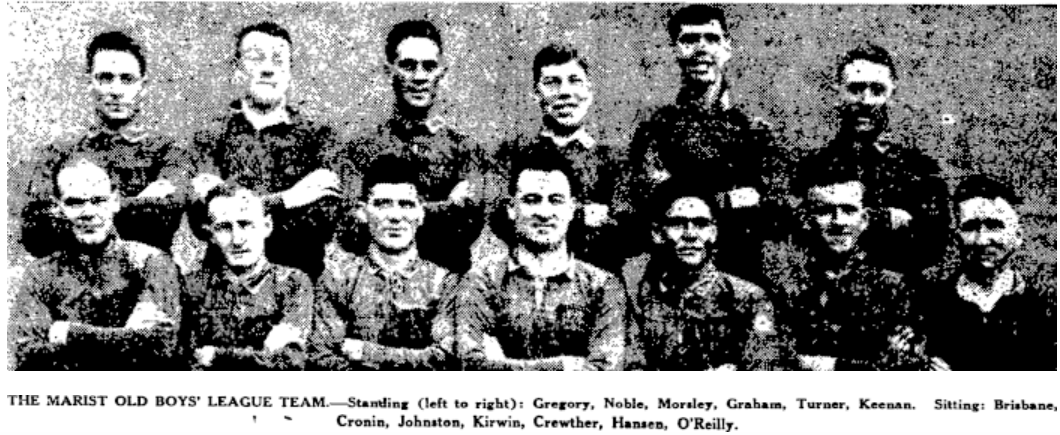
The Marist team pictured in the newspaper after their match.

Jim O'Brien and Jim Stormont (ex-Marist players) had both retired from the game and were spectators at the match between Marist and Grafton. However, after watching they decided to come out of retirement and resume playing for their old team. Meanwhile Craddock Dufty returned to play for Newton after 5 years with Grafton Athletic. Well known Auckland sprint champion, Harry Hudson, debuted for Grafton on the wing and scored a try in their 20-8 loss to Marist.Les Bull refereed his 50th match involving senior rugby league teams in Auckland and was the third man to do this after Archie Ferguson (1912–22) and Billy Murray (1913-25). Ernest Ruby, the well known Devonport forward was unable to play in their opening match after suffering an injury at the gas works where he was employed.

7 May	City	23–19	Devonport	Carlaw Park 1
3:00	Try: George Wade, Lou Brown 2, Ben Davidson, George Perry; Con: Nelson Bass 3 Pen: Nelson Bass		Try: Allan Seagar, Len Scott, J Beattie 2, Jim O'Brien; Con: Allan Seagar 2	Attendance: 9,000; Referee: William Mincham

7 May	Marist	20–8	Grafton	Carlaw Park 2
3:00	Try: Horace Hansen, Jim Johnson, Bill Noble, Hec Brisbane 2, Bernard Sweeney; Con: Horace Hansen		Try: F Austin, Harry Hudson; Con: Ralph Longville	Attendance: 9,000; Referee: G McCowatt

7 May	Newton	13–8	Richmond	Auckland Domain 2
3:00	Try: Unknown x 3 Con: Unknown x 2		Try: Unknown x 2 Con: Unknown x 1	Referee: Les Bull

==== Round 2 ====
Prior to round 2 Wigan made an offer to Lou Brown of the City side, while Ben Davidson had reportedly received one from Hull. Future New Zealand coach Bill Telford debuted for Richmond and scored a try in their 15–15 draw with City. In the same match brothers Ken and Ray Hyland clashed heads diving to save a try with the result that Ken had to leave the field and Ray had to bandage his bleeding head to continue. Gordon Campbell also suffered a bad thigh injury and was taken to Auckland Hospital. Jim O'Brien (Devonport) was taken to hospital for treatment after a head injury sustained in their match with Marist.

14 May	Marist	12–8	Devonport	Carlaw Park 1
3:00	Try: Hec Brisbane 3, Jim O'Brien		Try: Stan Webb, Len Scott; Con: Neville St George	Attendance: 2000; Referee: H Taylor

14 May	City	15–15	Richmond	Carlaw Park 2
3:00	Try: Bill Hamilton, George Wade, Maurice Wetherill; Con: Nelson Bass; Pen: Nelson Bass; Drop: Nelson Bass		Try: Gordon Campbell, Frederick Bass, Bill Telford; Con: Mick Carroll 3	Attendance: 2000; Referee: Les Bull

14 May	Ponsonby	5–5	Newton	Grey Lynn Park
3:00	Try: Frank Delgrosso; Con: Frank Delgrosso		Try: A McIntrye; Con: Craddock Dufty	Referee: William Mincham

==== Round 3 ====
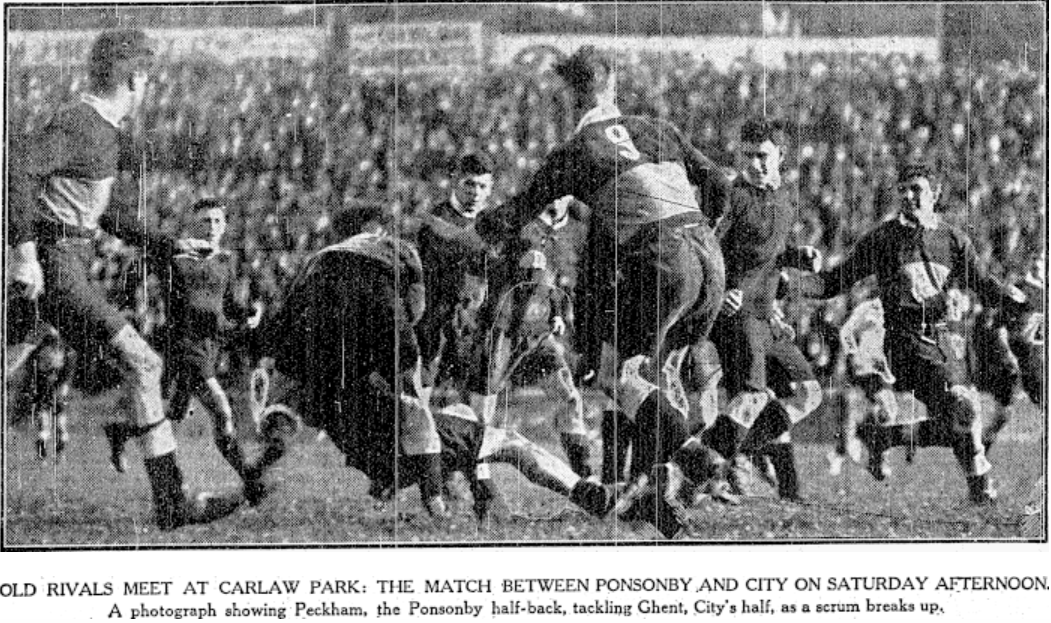
Ponsonby v City showing halfback Tim Peckham of Ponsonby tackling his opposite Billy Ghent.

Jim O'Brien and Stewart were both sent off for fighting near the Richmond try line in the Marist v Richmond match. Grafton only had 12 players make the trip to Devonport Domain where they were thrashed by Devonport 47–3. Nelson Bass tore his knee cartilage in the match between City and Ponsonby and was forced into early retirement. Arthur Rae made his first grade refereeing debut in the match between Devonport and Grafton on the Devonport Domain.

21 May	Ponsonby	17–14	City	Carlaw Park 1
2:45	Try: Leonard Riley 2, Bert Payne; Con: Frank Delgrosso 3 Pen: Frank Delgrosso		Try: Ben Davidson 2, Billy Ghent, George Wade; Con: Ben Davidson	Attendance: 10,000; Referee: A Sanders

21 May	Richmond	15–3	Marist	Carlaw Park 2
2:45	Try: Stewart, Jim Parkes, Ralph Jenkinson; Con: Edmund Carroll 2 Pen: Edmund Carroll		Try: Bernard Sweeney	Attendance: 10,000; Referee: Bert Emirali

21 May	Devonport	47–3	Grafton	Devonport Domain
2:45	Try: Len Scott 4, Stanley Rule 2, J Beattie 2, Allan Seagar, Horace Dixon 2 Con: J Hemingway 2, Ernest Ruby, Julius Laing, Bill Cleaver; Pen: Neville St George		Try: Angelo	Referee: Arthur Rae

==== Round 4 ====
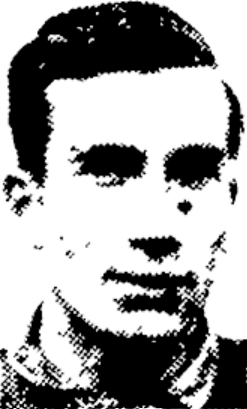
Leslie Knott (Marist)

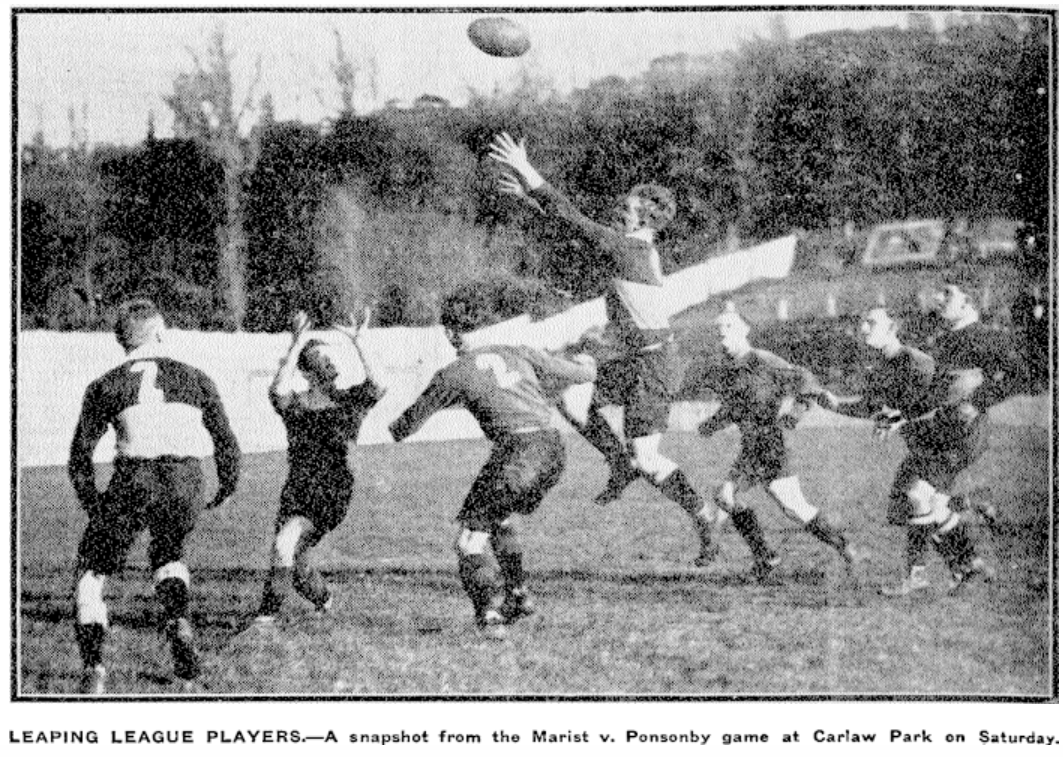

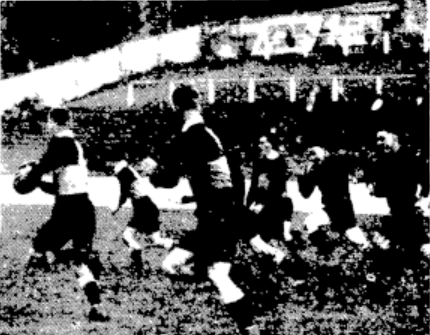
Ponsonby v Marist.

Leslie Knott debuted for Marist. He was a well known representative tennis player who along with N.G. Sturt was the New Zealand doubles champion. Knott was to play on the wing for Marist during the 1927 season. Ben Davidson scored a try and kicked a conversion for City in their loss but had to leave the field injured with a broken rib in the second half leaving them with 12 players. It was Newton's first win against City since they won 19-5 at Devonport Domain in 1920. The two sides had drawn 6-6 in 1921 before City won 13 games in a row against Newton.

28 May	Ponsonby	18–10	Marist	Carlaw Park 1
3:00	Try: Len Ward, Lou Hutt, Joseph Peckham, Victor Fagan; Con: Frank Delgrosso; Pen: Frank Delgrosso; Drop: Eric Grey		Try: Hec Brisbane, Jim Johnson; Con: Norman King 2	Attendance: 8,000; Referee: Les Bull

28 May	Newton	32–17	City	Carlaw Park 2
3:00	Try: Alan Clarke, Bert Little 2, George Morman 2, Craddock Dufty 2, McLeod; Con: Craddock Dufty 3 Pen: Craddock Dufty		Try: Lou Brown 2, Ben Davidson, George Wade (penalty try), Frank Ferrall; Con: Ben Davidson	Attendance: 8,000; Referee: Arthur Rae

28 May	Richmond	10–2	Grafton	Grey Lynn Park
3:00	Try: Stan Prentice, George Stewart; Con: L Taylor; Pen: Mick Carroll		Pen: Ralph Longville	Referee: H Taylor

==== Round 5 ====
The Devonport v Richmond match was played on the Friday as part of the King's Birthday celebrations. It was notable for the fact that 4 players were ordered off. Neville St George who had had words with the referee was sent from the field, two minutes later Stewart from Richmond joined him and Stan Prentice (Richmond), and Jim O'Brien (Devonport) soon followed. Leslie Knott scored two tries for Marist. At the end of the season he became the Auckland singles tennis champion and New Zealand doubles champion before moving to Australia to advance his career.

3 June	Devonport	17–13	Richmond	Carlaw Park 1
2:45	Try: Hemingway, Horace Dixon, J Beattie, Jim O'Brien, Ernest Ruby; Pen: Neville St George		Try: Ralph Jenkinson, J Swift, Gordon Campbell; Con: Edmund Carroll; Pen: Edmund Carroll	Attendance: 3000; Referee: Bert Emirali

4 June	Ponsonby	36–14	Grafton	Carlaw Park 2
2:45	Try: Joseph Peckham, George Gardiner, Frank Delgrosso 2, Sydney Usher 3, Wilfred McNeil; Con: George Gardiner 4, Tim Peckham, H Riley		Try: Ernie Herring 2 Con: Lucas; Pen: Lucas 3	Attendance: 6000; Referee: H McKubrey

4 June	Marist	12–7	Newton	Carlaw Park 1
3:00	Try: Norman King, Leslie Knott 2, Hec Brisbane		Try: Roy Hardgrave; Pen: Craddock Dufty 2	Attendance: 6000; Referee: Arthur Rae

==== Round 6 ====
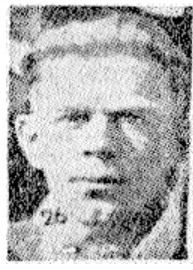
Ben Davidson

City were without the services of twin brothers Lou Brown and Ernest Brown, along with Maurice Wetherill, Nelson Bass and Alf Townsend and were soundly beaten by Marist. Frank Delgrosso of Ponsonby was ordered off in their match with Devonport. With the recent lifting of the ban on foreign players being allowed to play in the English league Ben Davidson had been signed by Wigan along with Lou Brown. Lou, twin brother Ernest, and Maurice Wetherill were all absent from the City side. Davidson who had broken a rib two weeks earlier had not intended to play but with the team short took a chance by playing and managed to come through unscathed.

11 June	Devonport	9–6	Ponsonby	Carlaw Park 1
3:00	Try: Allan Seagar, Neville St George, Len Scott		Try: Tim Peckham, Sydney Usher	Attendance: 7,000; Referee: William Mincham

11 June	Marist	33–8	City	Carlaw Park 2
3:00	Try: Jim O'Brien, Leslie Knott 2, Dick Moisley, Bernard Sweeney, Jack Keenan, Norman King, Hec Brisbane, Robert Crewther; Con: Jim O'Brien, Leslie Knott; Pen: Jim O'Brien		Try: Bill Hamilton, Joe Lewis; Con: Ben Davidson	Attendance: 7,000; Referee: Vic Simpson

11 June	Newton	19–14	Grafton	Auckland Domain
3:00	Try: Trevor Hall, Bert Little 2, George Morman, James Hales; Con: M Herewini 2		Try: John Angelo, Courtney 2, Bert Avery; Con: Ralph Longville	Referee: Taylor

==== Round 7 ====
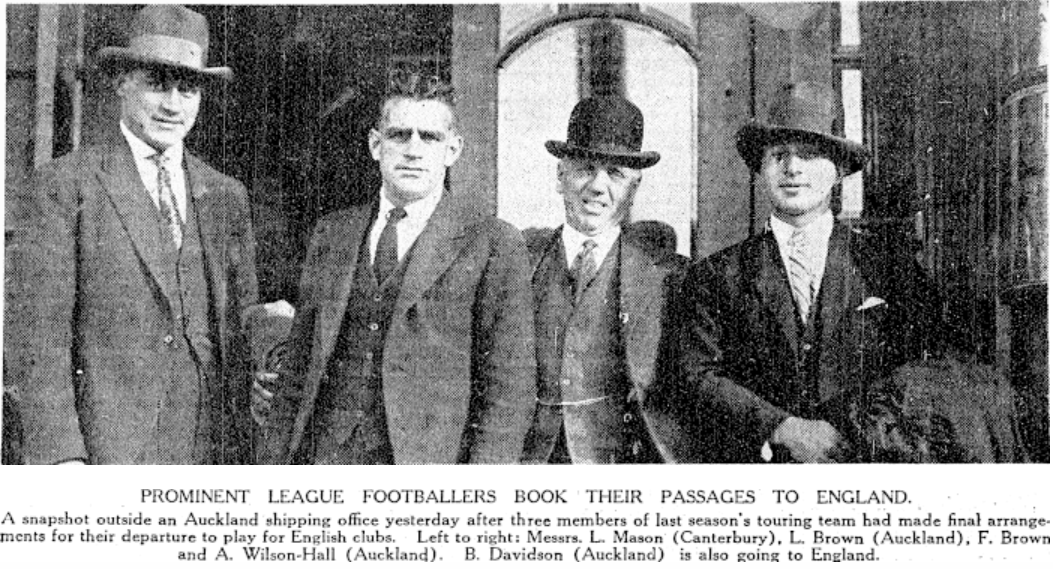

City had lost the services of Lou Brown and Ben Davidson who had both been signed by Wigan during the week. They would depart for England later in the month. In their match with Devonport two players for Newton left the field injured during the second half leaving them with 11 players. With the scores tied 13-13 with two minutes remaining Frank Delgrosso kicked a penalty to hand Ponsonby a two point win.

18 June	Ponsonby	15–13	Richmond	Carlaw Park 1
3:00	Try: Victor Fagan, Lou Hutt, Eric Grey; Con: Frank Delgrosso 2 Pen: Frank Delgrosso		Try: Ralph Jenkinson, Ken Hyland, Stewart; Con: L Taylor; Drop: Jenkinson	Attendance: 5,000; Referee: H Taylor

18 June	City	22–11	Grafton	Carlaw Park 2
3:00	Try: George Wade 2, Joe Hadley, George Perry, Billy Ghent, Frank Ferrall; Con: Joe Hadley, Billy Ghent		Try: Bert Avery 2, Allan; Con: E Lucas	Attendance: 5,000; Referee: Les Bull

18 June	Devonport	32–8	Newton	Devonport Domain
3:00	Try: Allan Seagar 2, Alf Scott, Neville St George, Bill Cleaver, Horace Dixon, J Beattie, Len Scott; Con: Alf Scott 3, Julius Laing		Try: Trevor Hall, Leslie Katterns; Pen: Craddock Dufty	Attendance: 1,000; Referee: William Mincham

==== Round 8 ====
City were further weakened after Alf Townsend was transferred to Dunedin permanently for work during the week. In the Marist match with Grafton, Norman King broke a bone in his hand and had to leave the field.

25 June	Newton	19–11	Richmond	Carlaw Park 1
3:00	Try: W Little, Henry, Roy Hardgrave, Craddock Dufty, George Morman; Con: Craddock Dufty 2		Try: L Taylor 2, Jim Parkes; Con: L Taylor	Attendance: 7,000; Referee: Les Bull

25 June	Devonport	10–3	City	Carlaw Park 2
3:00	Try: Len Scott, Horace Dixon; Pen: Julius Laing, Neville St George		Try: George Wade	Attendance: 7,000; Referee: Percy Rogers

25 June	Marist	34–9	Grafton	Auckland Domain
3:00	Try: Norman King, Leslie Knott 2, Jim O'Brien, Hec Brisbane, Bernard Sweeney 2, Jack Keenan; Con: Charles Gregory 5		Try: Bert Avery; Con: Ralph Longville; Pen: E Lucas, Ralph Longville	Referee: H Neal

==== Round 9 ====
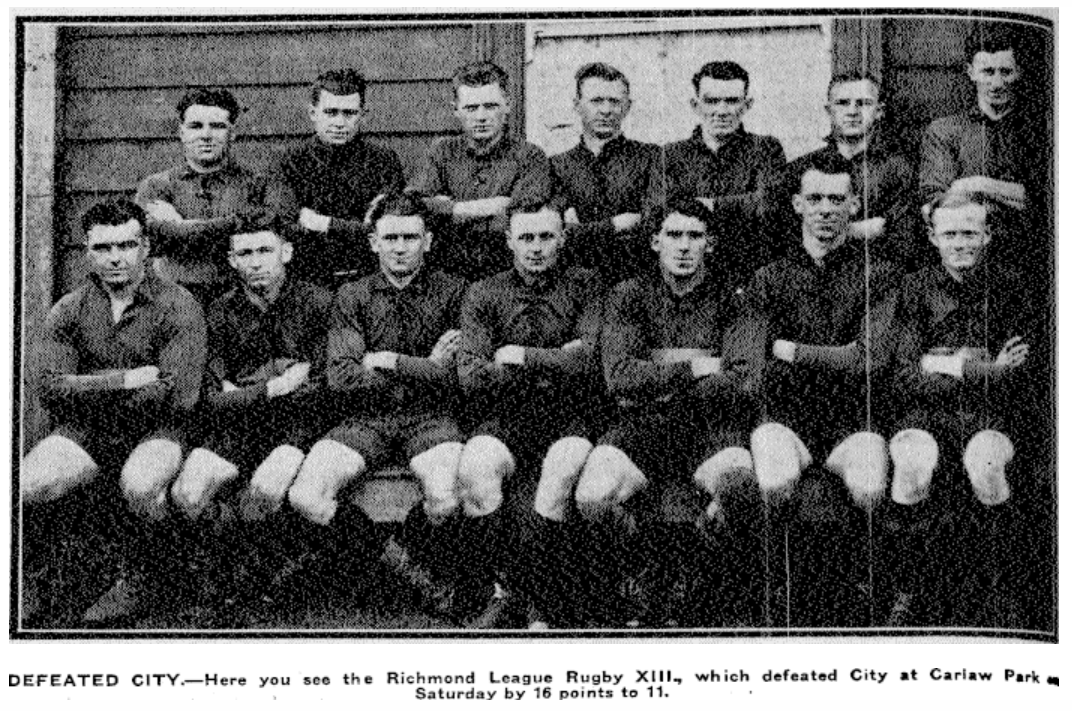

City sought to strengthen their side due to the large number of players who had departed. They signed Godkin, a Bay of Plenty rugby player, Pascoe a Manukau rugby player, and E Spencer a league representative from the Waimairi club in Canterbury. Te Huia Hawira Mason also joined the City side from Huntly (Len Mason's brother). Despite this they still lost to Richmond 16-11 which was Richmond's first ever win over City stretching back to their first ever meeting in 1922. City had won the first 11 games before an 11-11 draw earlier in the 1927 season. Devonport captain Jim O'Brien was ordered off in their loss to Marist. At the conclusion of the match the referee (H. Taylor) was escorted from the field by two police officers as several spectators crowded and heckled him. Opponents Jack Kirwan and his namesake Jim O'Brien (Marist) had tried to plead his case to the referee to allow him to stay on the field and the Devonport later wrote a letter to the Marist club thanking them. Taylor had replaced Wally Ripley as referee after Ripley fell ill before the match. He was suspended for their following match. The match between Newton and Ponsonby at the Auckland Domain was postponed due to the ground being unfit for play. The following weekend saw all games suspended and the postponed match played at Carlaw Park. Ironically rain fell throughout the match and the field "was badly churned up as the game progressed". The former New Zealand hooker Sam Lowrie had his jaw broken playing for Ponsonby and retired from the game having played 144 games for Ponsonby from 1914 to 1927.

2 July	Marist	16–6	Devonport	Carlaw Park 1
2:45	Try: Jock Graham 3, Jim Johnson; Con: Charles Gregory 2		Try: J Beattie, Harry Douglas	Attendance: 11,000; Referee: H Taylor

2 July	Richmond	16–11	City	Carlaw Park 2
2:45	Try: Jim Parkes, Bill Davis, Bill Telford, J Swift; Con: L Taylor; Pen: L Taylor		Try: George Wade, Billy Ghent, Godkin; Pen: Maurice Wetherill	Attendance: 11,000; Referee: Arthur Rae

9 July	Newton	14–3	Ponsonby	Carlaw Park 1
2:45	Try: Alan Clarke, A McIntyre, Roy Hardgrave, G Rhodes; Con: Craddock Dufty		Try: R Allen	Attendance: 3,500; Referee: Les Bull

==== Round 10 ====
After their game Richmond lost captain Jim Parkes who was moving back to Christchurch to join the Hornby club. The match between Devonport and Grafton was postponed due to the unfit nature of the field at the Auckland Domain. It was played on the following weekend at Devonport with other fixtures from that round not played due to the Auckland Rugby League making Carlaw Park available for the soccer match between New Zealand and Canada. Ponsonby fielded 3 brothers, future New Zealand international Tim Peckham, and his older brother Joseph, and younger brother Kenneth.

16 July	Marist	5–2	Richmond	Carlaw Park 1
3:00	Try: Norman King; Con: Charles Gregory		Pen: L Taylor	Attendance: 9,000; Referee: Arthur Rae

16 July	Ponsonby	15–8	City	Carlaw Park 2
3:00	Try: Sydney Usher, Joseph Peckham 2, Kenneth Peckham, Dooley Moore		Try: George Wade 2 Con: Te Huia Hawira Mason	Attendance: 9,000; Referee: Bert Emirali

23 July	Devonport	32–8	Grafton	Devonport Domain
3:00	Try: Stan Webb 2, Allan Seagar 3, J Beattie 2, Len Scott; Con: Alf Scott 2, Julius Laing, Bert Laing		Try: Christmas, Bert Avery; Con: Ralph Longville	Referee: H McKubrey

==== Round 11 ====
30 July	Ponsonby	13–0	Marist	Carlaw Park 1
3:00	Try: Leonard Riley, Tim Peckham, Dooley Moore; Con: George Gardiner 2			Attendance: 8,000; Referee: William Mincham

30 July	Newton	14–8	City	Carlaw Park 2
3:00	Try: Roy Hardgrave, Wally Somers, Trevor Hall, A McIntyre; Con: Craddock Dufty		Try: Maurice Wetherill, Norman Pascoe; Con: F Austin	Attendance: 8000; Referee: H Taylor

30 July	Richmond	21–3	Grafton	Victoria Park
3:00	Try: Frederick Bass, Trevor Hanlon, J Swift 2, Bill Davis; Con: L Taylor 3		Try: C Timmins	Referee: Percy Rogers

==== Round 12 ====
Newton beat Marist for the first time since 1919. The two teams had drawn 5-5 in their first meeting in 1920 before Marist then won 14 games in a row. For Newton Roy Hardgrave, M Little, Wally Somers, and W Henry scored their tries with Craddock Dufty kicking four goals.

6 August	Newton	20–10	Marist	Carlaw Park 1
3:00	Try: Roy Hardgrave, M Little, Wally Somers, W Henry; Con: Craddock Dufty 3 Pen: Craddock Dufty		Try: Jim O'Brien, Leslie Knott; Con: Charles Gregory; Pen: Charles Gregory	Attendance: 8000; Referee: Les Bull

6 August	Ponsonby	31–7	Grafton	Carlaw Park 2
3:00	Try: Frank Delgrosso 3, George Gardiner, Kenneth Peckham, Victor Fagan, Tim Peckham; Con: George Gardiner 3, Tim Peckham; Pen: George Gardiner		Try: Angelo; Con: Lucas; Pen: Ralph Longville	Attendance: 8,000; Referee: H McKubrey

6 August	Devonport	18–8	Richmond	Devonport Domain
3:00	Try: Ernest Ruby, J Beattie 2, Stanley Rule; Con: Alf Scott 3		Try: Ken Hyland, Frederick Bass; Con: Edmund Carroll	Referee: William Mincham

==== Round 13 ====
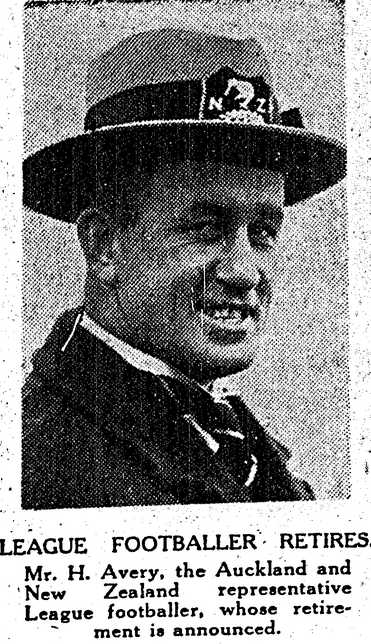

Bert Avery was carried off the field with concussion in the Newton match against Grafton. He had been attempting to tackle M Herewini who tried to hurdle him and made contact with Avery's head. Avery was taken to Auckland Hospital where he eventually recovered. His brother Henry who was also a league played died later in the week after a bout of pneumonia and Bert Avery decided to retire after many years playing for and captaining Grafton and New Zealand. Grafton was heavily hit by illness and injury and had five regular players absent and needed to send a message to Grey Lynn Park where their 4th grade side had played for emergency players.

13 August	Ponsonby	9–6	Devonport	Carlaw Park 1
3:00	Try: Kenneth Peckham, George Gardiner, Sydney Usher		Try: J Beattie, Stanley Rule	Attendance: 7,000; Referee: William Mincham

13 August	Marist	PPD	City	Auckland Domain 2
3:00				Referee: Vic Simpson

13 August	Newton	28–2	Grafton	Victoria Park
3:00	Try: Alan Clarke 2, Trevor Hall, A McIntyre, D McLeod, Wally Somers; Con: Craddock Dufty 4 Pen: Craddock Dufty		Pen: E Lucas	Referee: H Taylor

==== Round 14 ====
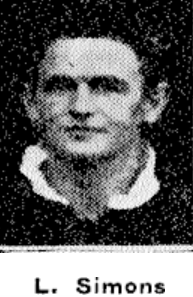
Lindsay Simons debuted for Devonport as a 17 year old. He played for Auckland in 1929 and trialed for the New Zealand side before transferring to Wellington in 1930 where he played for their representative side.

The games at Carlaw Park were played in poor conditions with all teams covered in mud by the end. The City v Grafton game at Victoria Park saw a large number of juniors playing for each side, said to be about ten in total with some coming up from as low as the fifth grade. With the retirement of Bert Avery the captaincy was taken over by Grafton's small halfback, E. Lucas. Lucas, normally a halfback moved out to standoff once more with Martin continuing in the halfback position where he debuted a week earlier. Lindsay Simons debuted at fullback for Devonport. With the score 3-3 at halftime, Craddock Dufty won the game for Newton with a penalty who had to finish the game with 12 players after their forward, Henry, had to leave the field with a head injury. Dufty's goal meant that a playoff was needed to decide the champion. Rhodes played halfback for Devonport as Stan Webb was unavailable due to a broken bone in his hand.

20 August	Newton	5–3	Devonport	Carlaw Park 1
3:00	Try: Bert Little; Pen: Craddock Dufty		Try: Len Scott	Attendance: 4,000; Referee: Percy Rogers

20 August	Ponsonby	19–5	Richmond	Carlaw Park 2
3:00	Try: George Gardiner, Kenneth Peckham, Eric Grey, Frank Delgrosso, Wilfred McNeil; Con: George Gardiner 2		Try: Stan Prentice; Con: Bill Telford	Attendance: 4,000; Referee: Walter Ripley

20 August	City	5–0	Grafton	Victoria Park
3:00	Try: Billy Ghent; Con: E Spencer			Referee: H McKubrey

==== Final ====
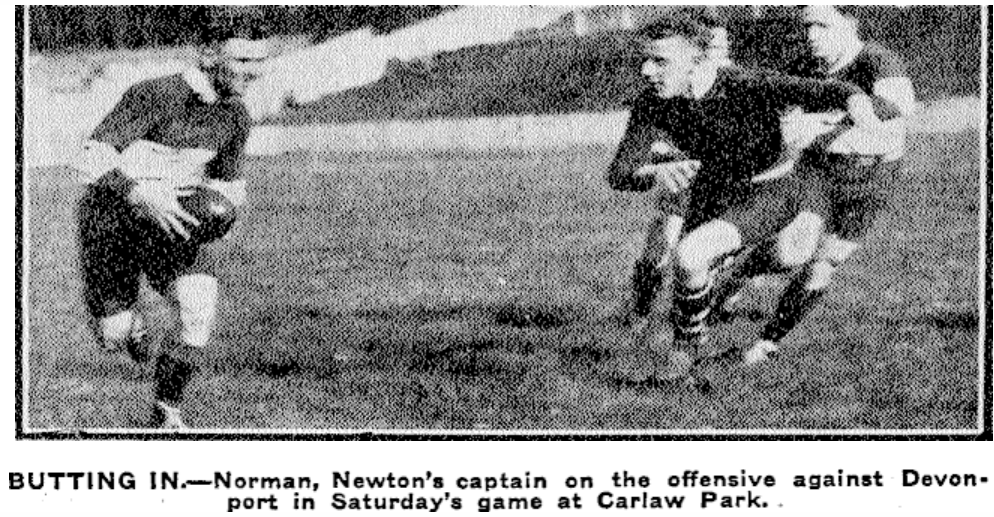
George Morman, Newton captain, running with the ball in the championship final.

In the championship final Ponsonby lost centre Sydney Usher early in the second half when they led 3-0. Bert Payne had to come out of the scrum to take a place on the wing as a result. Then during the half Craddock Dufty kicked two penalties to give Newton the lead. With three minutes to go M Herewini, the Newton fullback fielded the ball and ran into position about forty yards out and drop kicked a long range goal. Newton held on to win and with the full time whistle their supporters rushed the field and carrier several players off on their shoulders. It was their second championship title following one in 1912 and was to be their last.

27 August	Newton	6–3	Ponsonby	Carlaw Park 1
3:00	Pen: Craddock Dufty 2 Drop: M Herewini		Try: Wilfred McNeil	Attendance: 12,000; Referee: Les Bull

=== Roope Rooster knockout competition ===
==== Round 1 ====
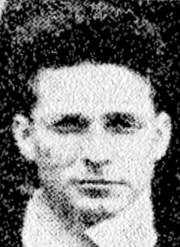
Charles Gregory

Craddock Dufty and captain Alan Clarke were both out injured from the Newton side for their match with Marist. The Marist backline was very reshuffled with Charles Gregory moving from fullback to first five eighth where he was said to have been outstanding, Jack Kirwan to the unaccustomed position of fullback, Leslie Knott from wing to outside centre, and Hec Brisbane from outside centre to inside centre. Bill Hamilton went off injured for City meaning they had to finish the match with Richmond with 12 players. The scores were tied at the end of the match 17–17 so 5 minutes extra time was played with Bill Telford scoring and Edmund (Mick) Carroll converting to win the game for Richmond. This was the first time extra time had been used to decide a game in an Auckland Rugby League senior competition. Usually matches were replayed the following week.

3 September	Marist	27–13	Newton	Carlaw Park 1
3:00	Try: Jim O'Brien, Leslie Knott, Bill Noble 2, George Drew, Hec Brisbane, Bernard Sweeney; Con: Charles Gregory, Leslie Knott, Owen Cronin		Try: Roy Hardgrave, A McIntyre, M Little; Con: M Herewini; Pen: M Herewini	Attendance: 6,000; Referee: A Sanders

3 September	Richmond	22–17 (17–17)	City	Carlaw Park 2
3:00	Try: L Taylor 2, J Swift, Ralph Jenkinson, Turton, Bill Telford; Con: L Taylor, Mick Carroll		Try: C Pascoe 2, George Wade; Con: E Spencer 2 Pen: E Spencer 2	Attendance: 6,000; Referee: H Taylor

3 September	Ponsonby	27–16	Grafton	Victoria Park
3:00	Try: Sydney Usher 2, Len Ward 2, Kenneth Peckham, R Allen, George Gardiner; Con: Frank Delgrosso, Eric Grey, Lou Hutt		Try: Allen 2, Forbes, Martin; Con: E Lucas, Ralph Longville	Referee: William Mincham

==== Semi finals ====
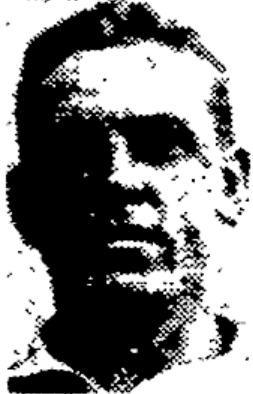
P. Holmes (Devonport)

The Auckland representative team had left for their southern tour and so all teams were fielding greatly weakened sides. P. Holmes, an Auckland rugby representative three-quarter who played 3 games for Auckland in 1926 signed for Devonport just before their game with Ponsonby.

10 September	Devonport	21–5	Ponsonby	Carlaw Park 1
3:00	Try: P Holmes 2, Alf Scott, Allan Seagar, Len Scott; Con: Allan Seagar 2, Lindsay Simons		Try: George Gardiner; Con: George Gardiner	Referee: H Taylor

10 September	Richmond	15–0	Marist	Carlaw Park 2
3:00	Try: Turton, Ralph Jenkinson 2 Con: L Taylor 2 Pen: L Taylor			Referee: Les Bull

==== Final ====
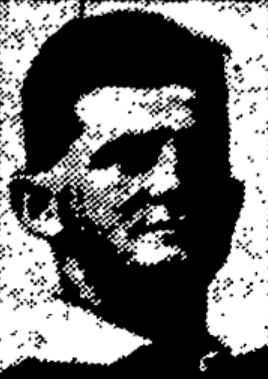
Angus Finlayson

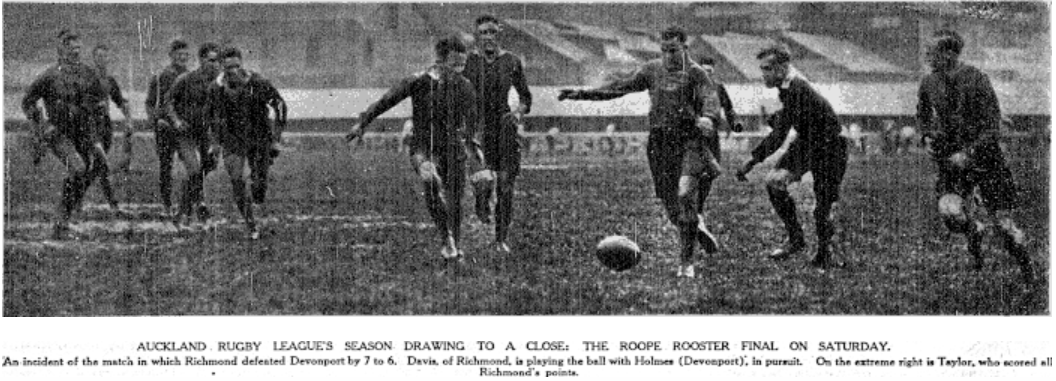

Angus Finlayson switched codes to join Richmond signing one minute before kick off so as to keep the switch secret. He was the brother of Innes "Bunny" Finlayson the All Black of 1925-30. Angus represented Northland at rugby and also Auckland from 1924 to 1934. The following week he applied for reinstatement into rugby union. Richmond won the Roope Rooster for the second consecutive year. It was a case of déjà vu with another 1 pt victory over Devonport who they had beaten the year before.

17 September	Richmond	7–6	Devonport	Carlaw Park 1
3:00	Try: L Taylor; Pen: L Taylor 2		Try: Len Scott 2	Referee: Percy Rogers

=== Stormont Memorial Shield ===
Newton won the match by 25 points to 14, but the match was noteworthy due to the large number of injuries suffered. George Morman the Newton captain was concussed and had his jaw broken, Dick Stack fractured his leg above the knee and a paling was torn off the fence to act as a splint. His injury was so serious that he would have his leg amputated four weeks later and spend months in Hospital. W. Rhodes broke his collar-bone, and Wally Somers sprained his ankle. The first three players were all taken to Auckland Hospital, while Somers was taken home. There were several matches in the following season used to raise funds for Stack and his family due to his inability to be able to work for some time.

1 October	Newton	25–14	Richmond	Carlaw Park 1
3:00	Try: G Rhodes, Craddock Dufty, Dick Stack, Alan Clarke 2, M Little, Roy Hardgrave; Con: Craddock Dufty 2		Try: Trevor Hanlon, Turton; Con: Mick Carroll; Pen: L Taylor 2, Mick Carroll	Attendance: 7,000; Referee: Les Bull

=== A Grade/B Grade promotion-relegation match ===
At the conclusion of the A and B division competitions the last placed Grafton Athletic from the A Division played against the winners of the B Division Ellerslie for the right to compete in the A Division in 1928. Ellerslie won the match by 11 points to 3 thus earning themselves a place in A Division and forcing Grafton Athletic to play in the lower grade. This was the first time in Auckland Rugby League competition that such a match had been played.

17 September	Ellerslie	11–3	Grafton	Carlaw Park 1
1:30	Try: W Johnston, R Johnston, Ivan Littlewood; Con: Kearns		Try: Jack McGregor

=== Top try scorers and point scorers ===
Top try and point scorers for A Division, Roope Rooster and Stormont Shield competitions.

Top try scorers
Rk	Player	Team	Gms	Tries
1	Len Scott	Devonport	14	14
2	J Beattie	Devonport	14	12
3	George Wade	City	12	11
4	Hec Brisbane	Marist	12	10
5=	Bert Little	Newton	14	9
5=	Allan Seagar	Devonport	14	9
7=	Leslie Knott	Marist	10	8
7=	Sydney Usher	Ponsonby	15	8
9=	Frank Delgrosso	Ponsonby	15	7
9=	Roy Hardgrave	Newton	10	7

Top point scorers
Rk	Player	Team	G	T	C	P	M	Pts
1	Craddock Dufty	Newton	14	4	17	9	0	64
2	L Taylor	Richmond	13	5	10	7	0	49
3	George Gardiner	Ponsonby	15	6	12	1	0	44
4	Frank Delgrosso	Ponsonby	15	7	8	3	0	43
5	Len Scott	Devonport	14	14	0	0	0	42
6	J Beattie	Devonport	14	12	0	0	0	36
7	Allan Seagar	Devonport	14	9	4	0	0	35
8	George Wade	City	12	11	0	0	0	33
9	Hec Brisbane	Marist	12	10	0	0	0	30
10	Leslie Knott	Marist	10	8	1	1	0	28

== B Division (Norton Cup) standings and results ==
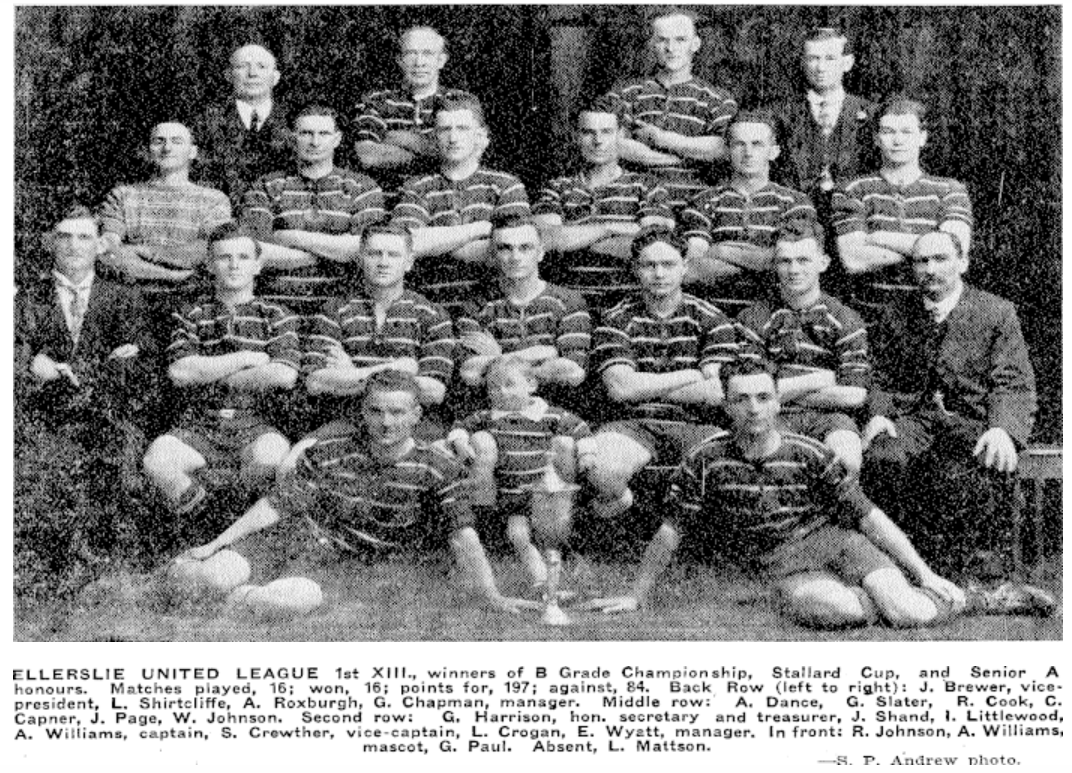

A large number of games did not have the scores reported in either The New Zealand Herald or the Auckland Star. As a result, the fixtures list is incomplete as is the final standings. Results are missing as follows, Kingsland x 2, Parnell x 1, Mangere x 4, Point Chevalier x 1, and Otahuhu x 1). In addition there were two cancelled matches. The round 4 match between Mangere and Kingsland did not have the result reported though it was said several weeks later that Kingsland was undefeated so they must have won the match. The Ellerslie match with Mangere on July 9 is missing the score so Ellerslie and Mangere teams for and against is incomplete.

=== B Division standings ===
Team	Pld	W	D	L	F	A	Pts
Ellerslie United	13	13	0	0	151*	75*	26
Kingsland Rovers	13*	10	0	2	137	60	20
Northcote & Birkenhead Ramblers	13	7	0	6	74	66	14
Parnell	12*	3	1	7	103	131	7
Māngere United	12*	3	0	7	63*	79*	6
Point Chevalier	13*	2	1	9	82	139	5
Otahuhu Rovers	12*	2	0	9	63	123	4

=== B Division (Norton Cup) fixtures ===
The Round 8 match between Mangere and Northcote was not played due to the condition of the ground at Mangere. However, after an inquiry it was stated that the Mangere team was willing to play and the referee said the match could go ahead. The Northcote team thought the match shouldn't be played and did not take the field. They also complained that they had to get changed underneath a gorse bush while a local official said there was a dressing room at Northcote's disposal. The league awarded the match to Mangere. The Round 15 match between Otahuhu and Northcote at the Auckland Domain was not played due to the condition of the field.

On May 14 Walker Park in Point Chevalier was used for the first time for a genuine senior grade match when Point Chevalier beat Māngere 9–5. It was approximately the 20th different ground to be used for senior rugby league in Auckland since its origins in 1908.

	Date		Score		Score	Venue
Round 1	7 May	Northcote	7	Mangere	6	Victoria Park
–	7 May	Otahuhu	12	Point Chevalier	6	Otahuhu Trotting Ground
–	7 May	Ellerslie	6	Parnell	5	Ellerslie Reserve
Round 2	14 May	Kingsland	8	Parnell	5	Victoria Park
–	14 May	Otahuhu	6	Ellerslie	8	Otahuhu Reserve
–	14 May	Point Chevalier	9	Māngere	5	Walker Park, Point Chevalier
Round 3	21 May	Ellerslie	26	Mangere	7	Ellerslie Reserve, 3pm
–	21 May	Otahuhu	3	Kingsland	11	Otahuhu Trotting Ground, 3pm
–	21 May	Point Chevalier	5	Northcote	6	Walker Park, Point Chevalier, 3pm
Round 4	28 May	Ellerslie	6	Northcote	0	Auckland Domain # 1, 3pm
–	28 May	Otahuhu	8	Parnell	11	Otahuhu Reserve
–	28 May	Mangere	L	Kingsland	W	Mangere, 3pm
Round 5	4 June	Kingsland	20	Northcote	6	Victoria Park, 3pm
–	4 June	Ellerslie	23	Point Chevalier	5	Ellerslie Reserve, 3pm
–	4 June	Mangere	15	Parnell	11	Otahuhu Trotting Ground
Round 6	11 June	Otahuhu	7	Mangere	6	Otahuhu Reserve
–	11 June	Northcote	8	Parnell	3	Auckland Domain, 3pm
–	11 June	Kingsland	11	Point Chevalier	5	Victoria Park
Round 7	18 June	Otahuhu	5	Northcote	8	Otahuhu Reserve, 3pm
–	18 June	Ellerslie	9	Kingsland	5	Ellerslie Reserve, 3pm
–	18 June	Point Chevalier	?	Parnell	?	Walker Park, Point Chevalier, 3pm
Round 8	25 June	Point Chevalier	19	Otahuhu	3	Walker Park, Point Chevalier, 3pm
–	25 June	Mangere	WBD*	Northcote	LBD*	Mangere, 3pm
–	25 June	Ellerslie	21	Parnell	20	Auckland Domain # 1, 3pm
Round 9	2 July	Mangere	?	Point Chevalier	?	Mangere, 3pm
–	2 July	Ellerslie	13	Otahuhu	0	Ellerslie Reserve, 3pm
–	2 July	Kingsland	23	Parnell	7	Victoria Park, 3pm
Round 10	9 July	Northcote	13	Point Chevalier	0	Victoria Park, 3pm
–	9 July	Kingsland	25	Otahuhu	0	Auckland Domain # 2, 3pm
–	9 July	Mangere	L	Ellerslie	W	Otahuhu Trotting Ground, 3pm
Round 11	23 July	Mangere	8	Kingsland	11	Otahuhu Reserve, 3pm
–	16 July	Parnell	11	Otahuhu	7	Victoria Park, 3pm
–	16 July	Ellerslie	8	Northcote	0	Ellerslie Reserve, 3pm
Round 12	30 July	Mangere	16	Parnell	8	Auckland Domain # 2, 3pm
–	30 July	Kingsland	WBD	Northcote	LBD	Auckland Domain # 6, 3pm
–	30 July	Point Chevalier	6	Ellerslie	13	Walker Park, Point Chevalier, 3pm
Round 13	6 Aug	Mangere	?	Otahuhu	?	Mangere Trotting Ground, 3pm
–	6 Aug	Parnell	11	Northcote	8	Victoria Park, 3pm
–	6 Aug	Point Chevalier	8	Kingsland	20	Walker Park, Point Chevalier, 3pm
Round 14	13 Aug	Ellerslie	9	Kingsland	3	Carlaw Park # 2, 3pm
–	13 Aug	Northcote	5	Otahuhu	2	Auckland (Outer) Domain # 2, 3pm
–	13 Aug	Point Chevalier	11	Parnell	11	Walker Park, Point Chevalier, 3pm
Round 15	20 Aug	Otahuhu	PPD	Northcote	PPD	Auckland Domain # 2, 3pm
–	20 Aug	Ellerslie	9	Point Chevalier	8	Auckland Domain # 6
–	20 Aug	Kingsland	?	Mangere	?	Otahuhu Trotting Ground, 3pm

=== Stallard Cup knockout competition ===
1927 Stallard Cup results
	Date		Score		Score	Venue
Round 1	3 Sep	Kingsland	13	Parnell	8	Auckland Domain # 5, 3pm
–	3 Sep	Ellerslie	W	Otahuhu	L	Ellerslie Reserve, 3pm
Final	10 Sep	Ellerslie	15	Kingsland	10	Carlaw Park # 1, 1:30pm

== Other club matches and lower grades ==
=== Lower grade competitions ===
==== Second grade (Wright Cup) ====
Devonport won the competition with a season record of played 14, won 13, lost 1, points for 252 and against 62. Devonport also won knock out competition (Foster Shield) when they beat Remuera 15 to 7 on October 8 at Carlaw Park. City withdrew after 3 rounds, Grafton Athletic (Maritime) withdrew after 4 rounds, and Marist withdrew after round 15 near the end of the season. Newton entered a side in the knockout competition but were knocked out by Devonport immediately 32 points to 0. Ponsonby lost their semi final to Devonport, while Mangere were the other losing semi finalists, going down to Remuera 12 to 5.

Team	Pld	W	D	L	B	F	A	Pts
Devonport United	14	13	0	1	1	252	62	26
Remuera	14	8	2	3	1	195	57	18
Ponsonby United	13	6	2	1	2	123	33	14
Kingsland Rovers	14	4	0	6	2	90	78	8
Richmond Rovers	13	2	0	7	2	48	121	4
Māngere United	13	2	0	7	1	9	142	4
Marist Old Boys	12	1	0	5	1	18	85	2
Grafton Athletic	4	0	0	1	0	3	28	0
City Rovers	3	0	0	2	0	0	24	0

==== Third grade open (Walker Shield) ====
New Lynn won the competition by one point after a 3–3 draw with Grafton Athletic on July 30. The majority of match results were not reported so the standings are significantly incomplete. Grafton Athletic (Maritime) won the knockout competition when they defeated Devonport 12–3 on September 24. Grafton had beaten Glen Eden 3–2 in one semi final while Devonport beat Ponsonby 6–3 in the other semi final. Northcote withdrew from the championship after 7 rounds.

Team	Pld	W	D	L	B	F	A	Pts
New Lynn	12	2*	1	0	1	23	9	5*
Grafton Athletic	12	4	1	2	1	44	32	9
Ponsonby United	11	4	0	1	1	51	32	8
Devonport United	10	1	0	4	1	43	48	2
Northcote & Birkenhead Ramblers	6	1	0	2	1	20	26	2
Glen Eden Rovers	11	0	0	2	1	6	17	0
Māngere United	12	0	0	1	1	3	26	0

==== Third grade intermediate ====
There were several results not reported and the winner of the championship was never reported in any of the Auckland newspapers however in the 1949 Rugby League Annual it was stated that Richmond B had won this championship. Interestingly the following season at the Auckland Rugby League annual meeting when trophies were presented to winning teams in all grades there was none presented in this grade, possibly because it was an intermediate grade and only in its second year of competition. Richmond had won it in 1926 and won it again in 1928. The Richmond A team won the knockout competition when they defeated City in the final on October 8 by 20 points to 0. City had beaten Parnell 20–2 in one semi-final, while Richmond A won their semi-final 5–0 against Newton. Devonport withdrew from the championship after 16 rounds near the end of the season.

Team	Pld	W	D	L	B	F	A	Pts
Richmond Rovers A	17	11	0	2	2	162	39	22
Richmond Rovers B	15	10	0	1	2	97	31	20
City Rovers	17	6	0	6	2	102	65	12
Devonport United	14	6	0	5	2	63	56	12
Ellerslie United	16	4	0	6	2	26	61	8
Parnell	17	3	1	4	2	27	63	7
Kingsland Rovers	18	3	0	6	1	63	98	6
Point Chevalier	14	2	1	6	5	34	69	5
Newton Rangers	16	1	0	10	3	25	117	2

==== Fourth grade (Hospital Cup) ====
Richmond won the championship. Devonport won the knockout competitions when they beat Richmond 12–5 in the final on October 15. Richmond beat Remuera 19–0 in one semi final while Devonport beat Grafton Athletic (Maritime) in the other by 24 points to 2.

Team	Pld	W	D	L	B	F	A	Pts
Richmond Rovers	17	9	0	0	1	238	14	18
Devonport United	13	8	0	1	3	111	30	16
Grafton Athletic	14	4	0	5	2	107	47	8
Ponsonby United A	13	3	1	4	2	57	44	7
Remuera	13	0	2	6	2	13	143	2
Ponsonby United B	13	0	2	5	3	16	161	2
Ellerslie United	13	0	1	4	2	7	110	1

==== Fifth grade (Endean Shield) ====
Akarana won the championship. Not all of the results were reported so the standings are incomplete. They also won the knockout competition when they beat City in the final on October 15 by 7 points to 3. Newton withdrew from the competition after 4 rounds.

Team	Pld	W	D	L	B	F	A	Pts
Akarana	14	7	1	1	2	68	10	15
Richmond Rovers	14	7	1	2	2	59	29	15
City Rovers	13	5	0	3	3	66	24	10
Northcote & Birkenhead Ramblers	14	2	1	7	1	19	40	5
Ponsonby United	13	0	1	6	1	18	60	1
Newton Rangers	4	0	0	2	0	0	67	0

==== Sixth grade A ====
Akarana won the championship after beating Grafton Athletic (Maritime) 11 to 5 in the final on August 27. Devonport United won the Hammill Cup for winning the knockout competition when they beat Grafton Athletic in the final on October 22.

Team	Pld	W	D	L	F	A	Pts
Akarana	15	7	3	2	77	38	17
Grafton Athletic	16	6	3	5	78	59	15
Richmond Rovers	14	3	2	5	89	66	8
Point Chevalier	15	3	2	3	35	88	8
City Rovers	13	3	1	4	36	51	7
Devonport United	15	2	1	5	44	57	5

==== Sixth grade B (Myers Cup) ====
Richmond win the championship after beating Marist 6–0 on September 3. Marist won the knockout competition when they defeated Akarana 5–0 on October 8. Marist beat Richmond 7–6 in the semi-final. It was the Marist clubs first ever junior grade trophy.

Team	Pld	W	D	L	B	F	A	Pts
Richmond Rovers	16	12	0	1	2	130	19	24
Marist Old Boys	16	10	0	2	2	161	25	20
Point Chevalier	14	4	2	4	2	60	83	10
Akarana	15	4	1	5	2	35	92	9
City Rovers	14	1	0	8	3	24	75	2
Kingsland Rovers	13	1	0	6	3	5	43	2
Devonport United	14	0	1	6	2	10	88	1

==== Schoolboys competition ====
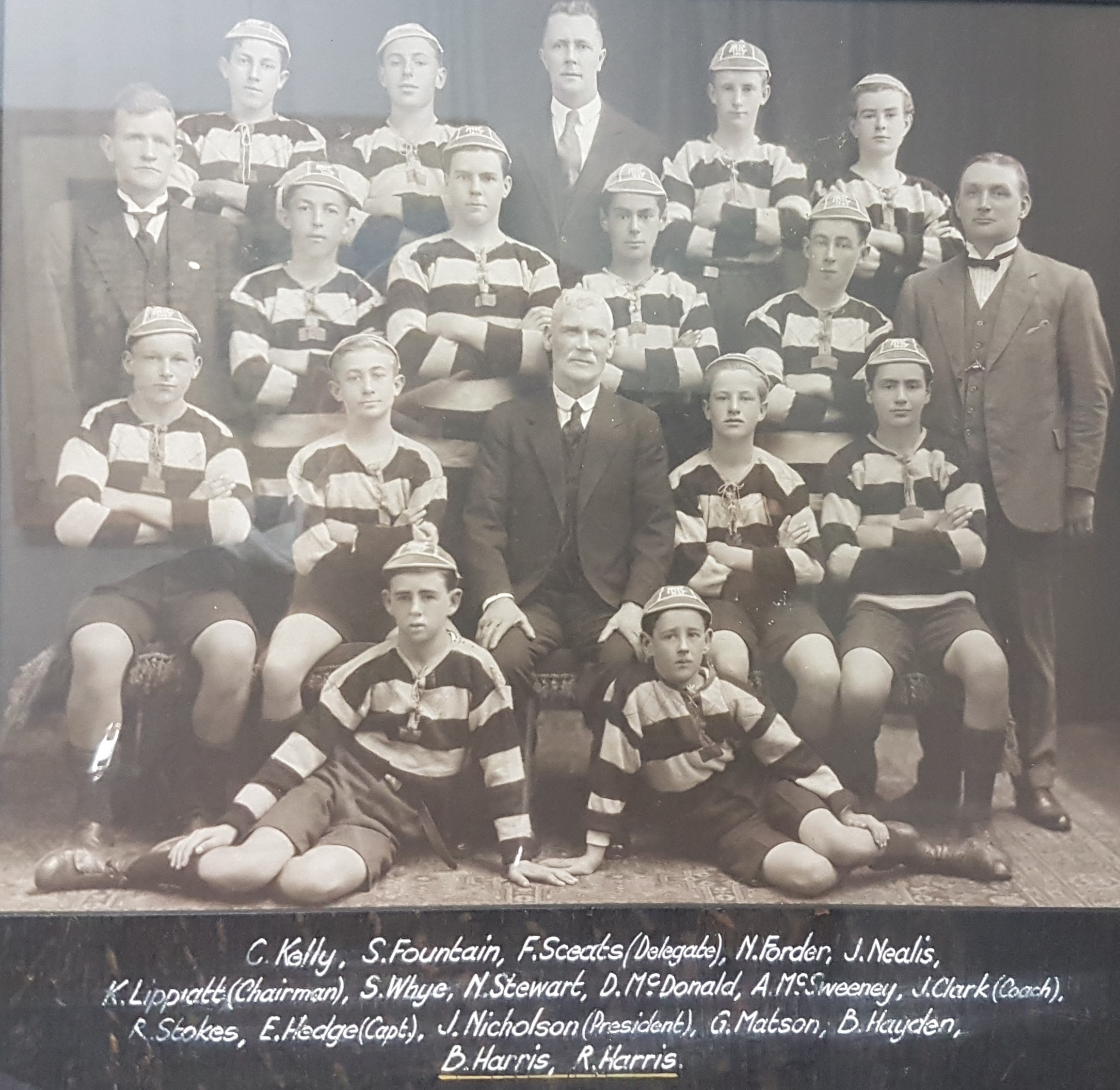
The championship winning Otahuhu side.

Otahuhu was a combination of students from several schools in the area and as such did not represent Otahuhu Primary School. The other schools were from the individual schools though the Papatoetoe school side had some players from the local Orphanage too. Newton Central Primary School entered a team in some matches late in the season and Newmarket Primary school entered a second side around the same time.

Team	Pld	W	D	L	F	A	Pts
Otahuhu Schools	10	9	0	1	207	9	18
Richmond Primary School	10	7	2	1	145	28	16
Newmarket Primary School	10	6	2	2	131	38	14
Papatoetoe Primary School	10	4	0	6	40	138	8
Onehunga Convent	10	1	0	9	11	94	2
Onehunga Primary School	10	1	0	9	6	180	2

=== Other matches ===
==== Huntly v Newton ====
For Huntly, winger Stan Raynor scored a try on fulltime with his brother George converting it to give a strong Huntly side the win. Huntly had a strong forward pack with future New Zealand representatives Tom Timms, James Jones, and Bob Stephenson in it.

24 July	Huntly	14-12	Newton	Ngāruawāhia
3:00	Try: J Farrell, George Raynor, Smith, Stan Raynor; Con: George Raynor		Try: Bert Little, George Mormon; Con: Craddock Dufty 2 Pen: Craddock Dufty	Referee: W Perry

==== Devonport v Ponsonby (Mayors Unemployment Relief Fund) ====
The final match of the season was one played by Devonport against Ponsonby for charity. The money raised was given to the Mayor's unemployment relief fund. Due to other events on during the day there was only time to play two 30 minute spells. The day raised around 250 pounds for the fund.

22 October	Devonport	27–19	Ponsonby	Carlaw Park 1
3:00	Try: Allan Seagar, Horace Hunt, Ernest Ruby, J Beattie, Alf Scott; Con: Allan Seagar 5 Pen: Allan Seagar		Try: R Allen 2, Frank Delgrosso 2, Victor Fagan; Con: Kenneth Peckham, W Langley	Attendance: 5,000

==== Additional Matches ====
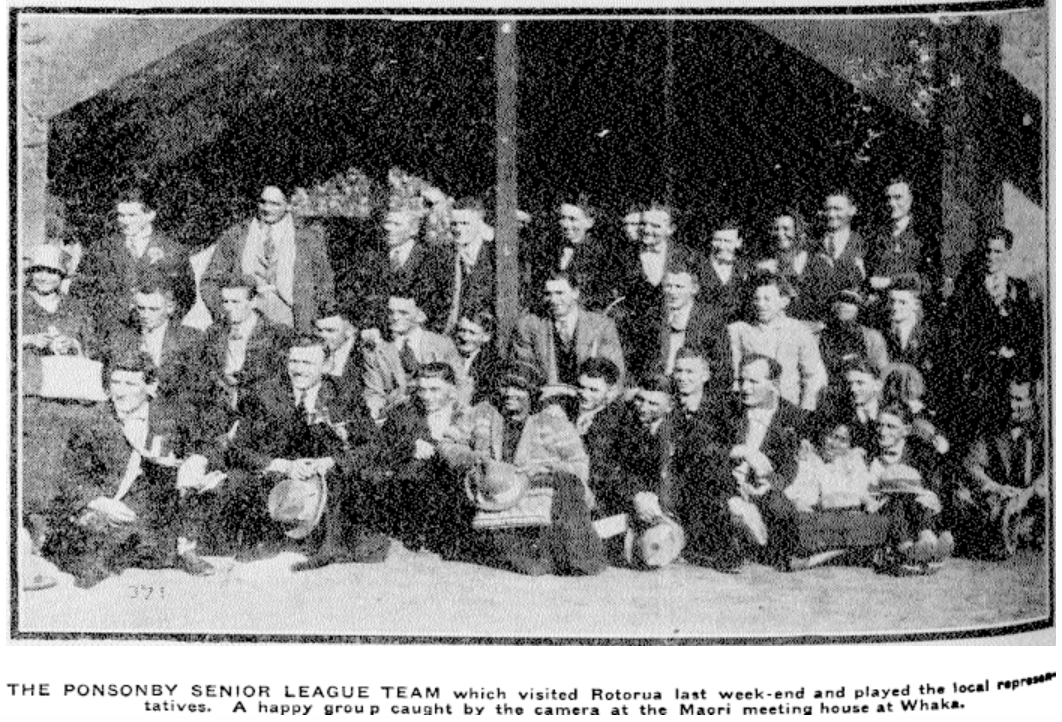
The Ponsonby touring side to Rotorua outside Whakarewarewa Marae.

	Date		Score		Score	Venue	Attendance
Junior representative trial match	9 July	A Team	5	B Team	3	Carlaw Park # 1	
Parnell tour match	9 July	Parnell	27	Rotorua	3	Rotorua	
Parnell tour match	9 July	Parnell Juniors	20	Rotorua Juniors	6	Rotorua	
Ponsonby tour match	23 July	Rotorua	15	Ponsonby	22	Rotorua	
Ponsonby tour match	3 Sep	Rotorua	8	Ponsonby	11	Rotorua	
Richmond junior tour match	1 Oct	Rotorua B	0	Richmond 3rd Grade	8	Rotorua	
Junior representative match	15 Oct	Auckland Juniors	15	South Auckland Juniors	0	Carlaw Park	

== Representative season ==
The Auckland teams for the season were to be selected by Ernie Asher, Edward Vincent Fox, and Alan Blakey. The Auckland representative team won 6 of its 7 matches. They began the year with a victory over the Auckland representatives of the New Zealand team which had toured the England and recently returned home. They went on a 4 match tour during the year which saw victories over Canterbury, West Coast, Otago, and Wellington. They then played home matches against Buller and South Auckland. Buller was coached by former New Zealand and Auckland player Bill Davidson. They beat Buller easily but then lost the Northern Union Challenge Cup after a loss to South Auckland.

=== Representative fixtures ===
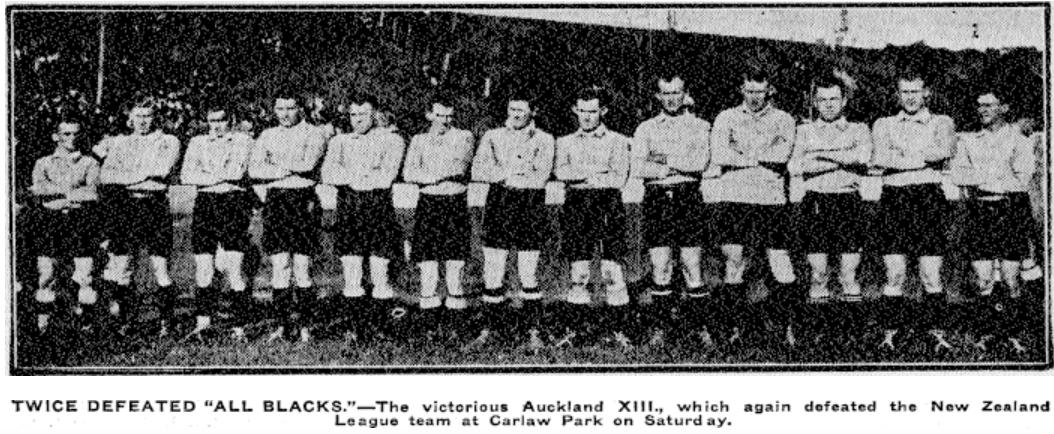

The first representative fixture of the season was played on 30 April between Auckland and the Auckland members of the 1926 New Zealand touring team of England.

==== Auckland v New Zealand (Auckland members) ====
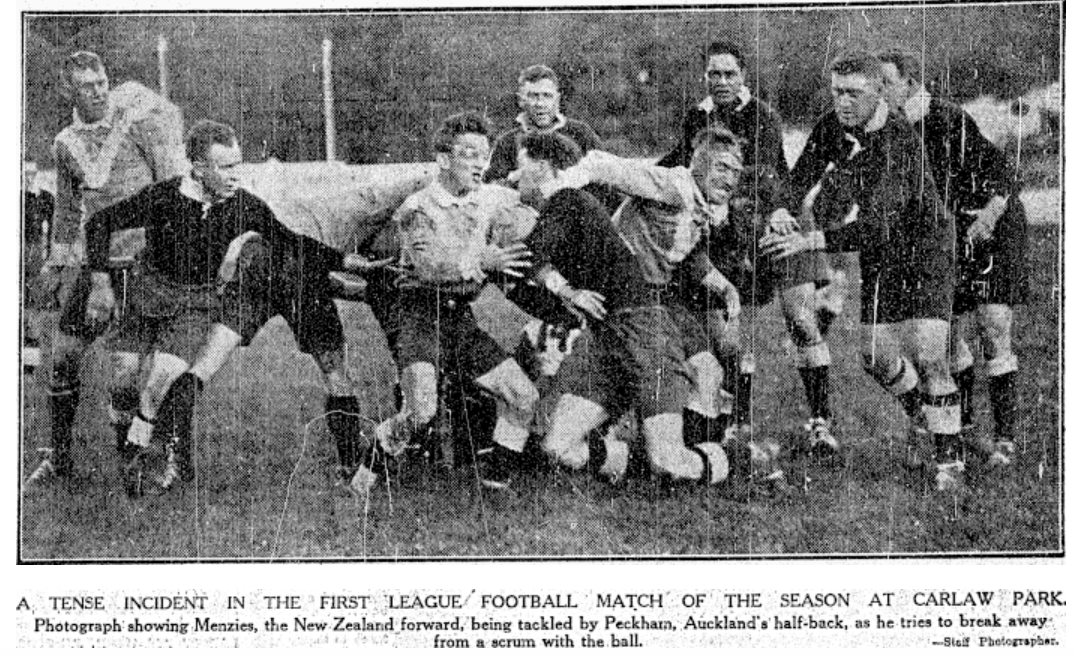

30 April	Auckland	24–21	New Zealand (Akl members)	Carlaw Park 1
3:00	Try: Ivan Littlewood, Claude List, Maurice Wetherill, Tim Peckham, Albert Payne, Alan Clarke; Con: Tim Peckham, Alan Clarke; Pen: Alan Clarke		Try: Lou Brown 3, Joe Menzies, Jim Parkes; Con: Craddock Dufty 2 Pen: George Gardiner	Attendance: 14,000; Referee: Les Bull

==== Southern Tour ====
In September Auckland toured the south, playing 4 matches. The 18 man touring side was Charles Gregory, Craddock Dufty, M Little, George Wade, Claude List, Joe Wilson jun., Maurice Wetherill, Stan Prentice, Stan Webb, A McIntyre, Wally Somers, Jim O'Brien (Devonport), Lou Hutt, Alan Clarke, Trevor Hall, Horace Dixon, A Payne, and F Bass. Several players originally named were unable to make the trip including Hec Brisbane, Riley, Usher, Frank Delgrosso, and J Beattie.

===== Auckland v Canterbury (Northern Union C.C.) =====
10 September	Canterbury	13–24	Auckland	Monica Park, Christchurch
3:00	Try: C Robins, H Vivian 2 Con: Gordon Blazey; Pen: Gordon Blazey		Try: Claude List, Stan Webb, Lou Hutt, Albert Payne 2, Horace Dixon; Con: Craddock Dufty 3	Attendance: 3,000; Referee: H Lawrence

===== West Coast/Buller v Auckland (Northern Union C.C.) =====
14 September	West Coast/Buller	15–42	Auckland	Victoria Park, Greymouth
3:00	Try: Vern Goodall 2, Norm Griffiths; Con: Charlie McElwee 3		Try: Maurice Wetherill 2, Joe Wilson jun. 3, M Little 3, Craddock Dufty, J Payne, Frederick Bass, Claude List; Con: Joe Wilson jun. 2, Craddock Dufty	Attendance: 1000; Referee: L Hunter

===== Otago v Auckland (Northern Union C.C.) =====
17 September	Otago	13–20	Auckland	Caledonian Ground, Dunedin
3:00	Try: R Oliver 2, M Quinn; Con: Dan Sullivan; Pen: Bert Eckhoff		Try: George Wade, M Little, Stan Webb, Jim O'Brien; Con: Craddock Dufty 4	Attendance: 2,000; Referee: G Packer

===== Wellington v Auckland =====
21 September	Wellington	23–41	Auckland	Newtown Park, Wellington
3:00	Try: S Brace, O Halliday 3, G Love; Con: R Bowen 3 Pen: R Bowen		Try: Stan Webb, Frederick Bass, Joe Wilson jun., Horace Dixon 4, Trevor Hall, George Wade; Con: Craddock Dufty 6, Frederick Bass	Referee: C Wrack

==== North Island v South Island ====
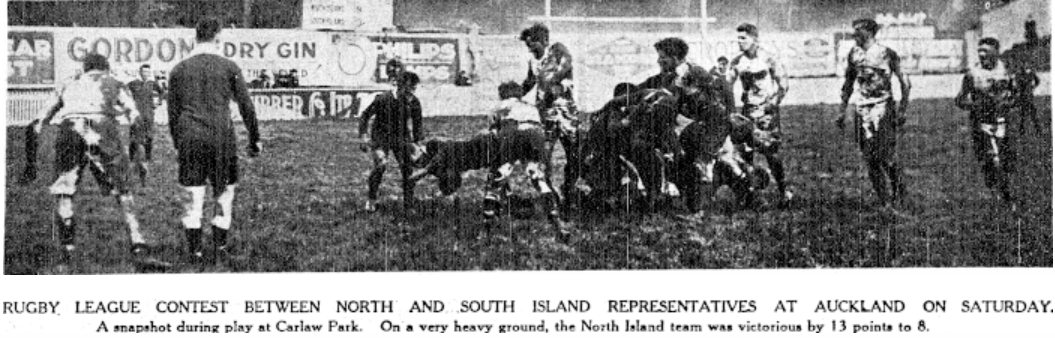

24 September	North Island	13–8	South Island	Carlaw Park 1
3:00	Try: Claude List, Stan Raynor 2 Con: Craddock Dufty 2		Try: Woods, Hand; Con: Sullivan	Attendance: 7,000; Referee: William Mincham

==== Auckland v Buller ====
The Buller side was coached by former City Rovers, Auckland, and New Zealand player, Bill Davidson.

8 October	Auckland	60–33	Buller	Carlaw Park 1
3:00	Try: Joe Wilson jun., Claude List 3, J Beattie 3, Charles Gregory 3, Maurice Wetherill, Stan Webb, Albert Payne 2, Horace Dixon, Lou Hutt; Con: Craddock Dufty 2, Joe Wilson jun., Charles Gregory, E Spencer 2		Try: Burns, Cameron 2, Jack, Stan Davis, Vern Goodall 2 Con: Vern Goodall 6	Attendance: 7,000; Referee: William Mincham

==== Auckland v South Auckland (Northern Union C.C.) ====
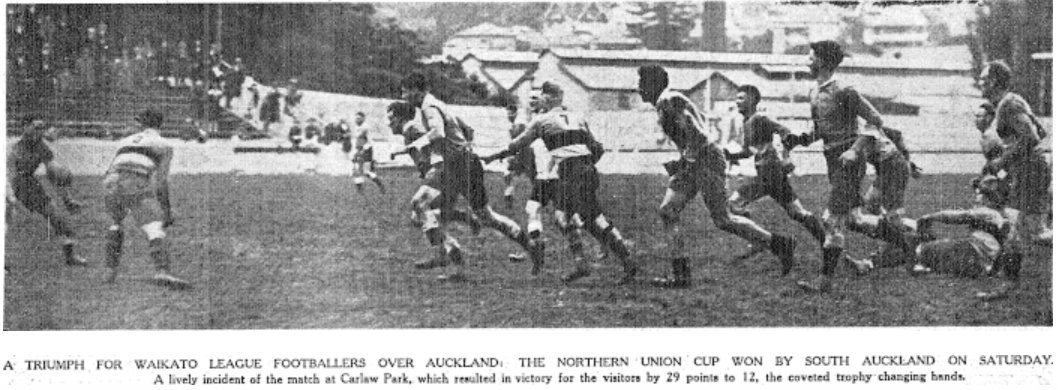

In the first half Albert Payne was injured and as there was no forward reserve for Auckland Allan Seagar had to replace him with Lou Hutt moving in to the hooking position. He was outplayed there by future New Zealand representative Bob Stephenson.

15 October	Auckland	12–29	South Auckland	Carlaw Park 1
3:00	Try: Roy Hardgrave, Claude List, Joe Wilson jun., Allan Seagar		Try: J Whorskey 2, Everest, Hec McDonald, Tom Timms 3 Con: J Whorskey 2, Stan Rayner; Pen: Stan Rayner	Attendance: 4,000; Referee: Les Bull

=== Auckland representative matches played and scorers ===
No	Name	Club Team	Play	Tries	Con	Pen	Drop Goal	Points
1	Craddock Dufty	Newton	6	4	13	0	0	38
2	Claude List	Kingsland	5	7	0	0	0	21
3	Albert (Bert) Payne	Ponsonby	6	6	0	0	0	18
3	Horace Dixon	Devonport	6	6	0	0	0	18
5	Joe Wilson jun.	Mangere	6	5	1	0	0	17
6	Maurice Wetherill	City	6	4	0	0	0	12
6	M Little	Newton	3	4	0	0	0	12
6	Stan Webb	Devonport	5	4	0	0	0	12
9	Charles Gregory	Marist	4	3	1	0	0	11
10	J Beattie	Devonport	1	3	0	0	0	9
11	Frederick Bass	Richmond	2	2	1	0	0	8
12	Alan Clarke	Newton	3	1	1	1	0	7
13	George Wade	City	3	2	0	0	0	6
13	Lou Hutt	Ponsonby	7	2	0	0	0	6
15	Tim Peckham	Richmond	1	1	1	0	0	5
16	E Spencer	City	1	0	2	0	0	4
17	Ivan Littlewood	Ellerslie	1	1	0	0	0	3
17	Jim O'Brien	Devonport	5	1	0	0	0	3
17	Trevor Hall	Newton	1	1	0	0	0	3
17	Roy Hardgrave	Newton	1	1	0	0	0	3
17	Allan Seagar	Devonport	1	1	0	0	0	3
22	Trevor Hanlon	Richmond	1	0	0	0	0	0
22	Stan Prentice	Richmond	4	0	0	0	0	0
22	Neville St George	Devonport	1	0	0	0	0	0
22	Wally Somers	Newton	4	0	0	0	0	0
22	A McIntyre	Newton	2	0	0	0	0	0
22	Stanley Rule	Devonport	1	0	0	0	0	0
22	Selby Crewther	Ellerslie	1	0	0	0	0	0
22	Ernest Ruby	Devonport	1	0	0	0	0	0

Preceded by 1926	18th Auckland Rugby League season 1927	Succeeded by 1928
