= Claude List =

Rugby league player (1902–1959)

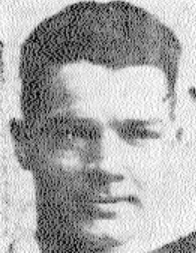

Personal information
- Full name: Victor Claude (Wilschefski) List
- Born: 2 December 1902 Maryborough, Queensland, Australia
- Died: 17 April 1959 (aged 56) Auckland, New Zealand

Playing information
- Height: 5 ft 11 in (1.80 m)
- Weight: 12 st 0 lb (76 kg)
- Position: Centre, Wing, Lock
Club
Years	Team	Pld	T	G	FG	P
1925–28	Kingsland Rovers	52	20	1	0	62
1929–30	Kingsland Athletic	29	14	0	1	44
1931–34	Marist Old Boys	50	28	3	1	92
1934–41	Mt Albert United	38	8	1	0	26
1942	Newton-Mt Albert	4	0	0	0	0
	Total	173	70	5	2	224
Representative
Years	Team	Pld	T	G	FG	P
1925–28	Auckland (Trial)	2	1	0	0	3
1925	Auckland B	3	2	0	0	6
1925–33	Auckland	25	28	0	0	84
1926–28	New Zealand (Trial)	2	1	0	0	3
1927–32	North Island	3	3	0	0	9
1928–32	New Zealand	4	3	0	0	9
1928	Auckland Province	1	0	0	0	0

Coaching information
Club
Years	Team	Gms	W	D	L	W%
1945–46	Mount Albert United

Claude List, born Victor Claude Wilschefski (2 December 1902 – 17 April 1959), was a rugby league player who represented New Zealand in the 1920s and 1930s. He represented New Zealand in one test match against England in 1928 and three more tests against England in 1932. In the process he became the 190th player to represent New Zealand. He also represented Auckland 24 times from 1925 to 1933, and the North Island side three times from 1927 to 1932. He played his club rugby league in Auckland for the Kingsland Rovers/Athletics club from 1925 to 1930, Marist Old Boys from 1931 to 1934, and then Mount Albert United from 1934 to 1941.

== Early life ==
Claude was born on 2 December 1902 in Maryborough, Queensland, Australia. His parents were Heinrich (Henry) Wilschefski and Mary Frances Carter. Henry had been born in Germany while Mary was born in Gorton, Lancashire, England. Their families had both emigrated to Australia in the late 1800s and they married in 1897. They had three children, Percy Lawrence Wilschefski (1899–1964), Annie Evelyn Wilschefski (1900–1982), and Claude who was the youngest. Henry died in Queensland on 14 November 1903, when Claude was just 11 months old. In 1907 she remarried to Francis Martin List who had also been born in Germany. They had 5 children which became Claude's half siblings though the first born, Norman Andrew List (1908–1908) died as an infant, Alice Holly List (1909–1995), Francis Martin List (1911–1976), Edna Marjorie List (1913–1914), and Irene Maude List (1915–?).

Some time between October 1915 and 1919 the family moved to New Zealand and lived in Glen Eden in 1919 according to census records. Francis was also a senior rugby league player and he and Claude played together on occasion.

== Playing career ==
=== Queensland ===
Claude List had started playing rugby league in Queensland as a schoolboy at about the age of 10 in 1912.

=== Kingsland Rovers ===
After moving to New Zealand the family settled in Auckland. The first mention of List is in a team list published on 10 June 1921, in the Auckland Star. He was named in the Kingsland Rovers third grade side along with another List though it is unknown who this was, possibly his older brother Percy. Claude would have been aged 18 at this time with Percy aged 22. His Kingsland side won the 3rd grade championship in the same season. The following 1922 season he continued to play for their 3rd grade side who were runners up in the championship. He was listed as "C List", while the other List in the team was "J List", his half brother, Johann. By 1923 Claude had moved into the Kingsland 2nd grade side.

In 1924 he was still in the 2nd grade side and was playing on the wing. His Kingsland side won the 2nd grade knockout competition when they beat Otahuhu Rovers on 18 October. Earlier in the season he had played for Kingsland against the Devonport United 2nd grade side as curtain-raiser to the New Zealand v England test match at Carlaw Park.

List was selected for the Auckland Junior representative side to play Hamilton juniors in a match at Carlaw Park on 30 August. He played on the wing with the Auckland side winning the match 14 to 8. He was chosen for the same side to play Hamilton once more on 4 October. This time the match was played at Steele Park in Hamilton and Auckland won 17 to 8 with List on the wing again. He scored one of Auckland's 5 tries.

=== Senior debut and Auckland representative selection ===
The 1925 season was to be a remarkable one for List. He made his senior debut for Kingsland who had been promoted to the newly formed B Division in Auckland club rugby league. And he became one of the only players to gain selection for Auckland from that grade, a feat he beat in 1928 when he became the first ever player in New Zealand to be selected for the national side from effectively a second division side. His first appearance was in Kingsland's opening round match on 18 April against Northcote & Birkenhead Rambers in an early match at Carlaw Park. He scored 3 tries in a 21–3 win. List opened the scoring and then early in the second half was "prominent in a fine passing bout, and dived over in the corner", then minutes later he "broke away after a scrum and scored his third try". He scored 3 more tries in their 13 all draw with Māngere United in round 3 on Peter Moko Farm in Māngere. In their next match with Otahuhu Rovers on 23 May. He "made several breaks only to be pulled up by smart tackling" in a 16–3 loss. He then scored another try in a 8–5 loss to Northcote. Following a 9–5 loss to Ellerslie United the New Zealand Herald said List "was responsible for several particularly fine solo efforts". While in further comments on the match the following day they said "List, for Kingsland, is a clever player, who usually scores the most number of points for his side".

Following a match with Mangere and then a bye, an Auckland trial side was selected between A and B teams. The match was a curtain-raiser to the North Island v South Island match at Carlaw Park on 27 June. List was selected in the three quarters of the B team by selectors Edward Fox, Albert Asher, and Ronald McDonald. He played well in a 5–0 win to his side. In the first half he saved a try after a break by Roy Hardgrave and later made a break with a run down the sideline and centred a kick which was saved by Charles Gregory. List again saved the B side when Hardgrave had made a "clever dribbling movement". The New Zealand Herald said during the week that "playing for the B team, List, the Kingsland player, showed up as a fine wing-three quarter. He has a good turn of speed and was the best of the B team's backs".

The match along with the inter-island game and an Auckland v South Auckland (Waikato) match were part of the trials to select the New Zealand side to tour Australia. Despite being a newcomer to the senior game the Auckland Star said that he was a little unlucky to not make the tour. List was chosen as a reserve for the Auckland side to play New Zealand on 2 July prior to their departure but did not take the field.

He then returned to his Kingsland side for 3 more club matches. The New Zealand Herald said that he was one of the players who had shown "particularly fine form" and was a young player who was in the frame for selection for Auckland's Southern Tour later in the season. After one further match for Kingsland on 25 July and following a bye he was named as an emergency player for Auckland's match with South Auckland (Waikato) on 19 August. Following Kingsland's loss to Otahuhu in the Stallard Cup, List was selected in the Auckland touring side. It was stated that he was 22 years old and weighed 12 stone.

With the New Zealand side on tour with a large number of Auckland players, the Auckland team was officially a B side with several young players aged 19 to 22. Their first match was against West Coast at Greymouth on the West Coast on 9 September. Auckland B won the match 22 to 15 with List scoring a try. His try came in the second half after "passing by Tim Peckham, Hector Cole, and Ben Davidson enabled List to score" in a tackle. He was then named in the match against Canterbury. Auckland B lost the match 6 points to 5 at Monica Park in Christchurch before a crowd of 2,500. List did not feature prominently in the match reports though was said to have "staged a useful dash down the far line". He was chosen again for their final tour match against Wellington on 16 September. Auckland thrashed the local side at Newtown Park in Wellington by 68 points to 9. List scored a try in the win. He combined with Ben Davidson to put Davidson in for a try to make the score 16–4. Then a while later Balks miskicked into List's hands and he was able to score easily under the posts with the conversion giving his side a 23–4 lead.

After their last tour match List was chosen in the full Auckland side to play South Auckland on 19 September. In his full Auckland debut he scored 2 tries in a 36–19 win at Carlaw Park. He played on the wing with Ben Davidson at centre with Leonard Riley and Hector Cole in the five eight positions. In the first half he "essayed a side dash down the line but was well grassed by Smith when near the corner flag". Then later in the half he "again tried to penetrate the strong defense and after dribbling, picked up the ball, threw across to Arthur Singe, who scored a good try". In the second half he was involved in a try to Davidson after he sprinted down the side line and in passed to a supporting Davidson, then a while later the two combined again but this time List scored in the corner. Later in the match "Horace Dixon thrust his way past several players and passed to Hector Cole, to Riley, who made the opening for List to again dash over near the corner". The Auckland Star said that "List fully justified his inclusion, and gave a brilliant exhibition" though the Herald noted that he had "started badly, but in the second spell gave a good exhibition". List was chosen as a reserve for the Auckland Province match against the touring Queensland side on 10 October with Johnston of South Auckland and Frank Delgrosso preferred on the wings. The Auckland Province side was thrashed 54–14 and during the match Auckland fullback Stan Raynor left the field but instead of being replaced by List he was replaced by Bill Te Whata. The Herald expressed surprise and said "when Raynor was hurt just before the interval there was considerable surprise when Te Whata, the reserve forward went on to the wing instead of List, the chosen reserve back… This is surely an injustice to the Kingsland player who was ready on the line. The action of the selectors cannot be commended and it is to be hoped that the New Zealand Council will ask for an explanation for a dangerous precedent has been set".

The 1926 season saw List play 16 matches for Kingsland scoring 11 tries and kicking a goal. He made 4 appearances for Auckland scoring 7 tries, being their equal leading try scorer along with George Wade. He also played in a New Zealand trial match scoring a try.

At the start of the year he was elected on to the Kingsland club committee. In their first game of the season against Otahuhu he scored all Kingsland's points with a try which he converted in a 6–5 loss. He was in his customary position on the wing. He "scored a fine try after Herring and McManus had made the opening". He scored further tries in a round 3 loss to Northcote where he was said to be "prominent" and a round 5 win over Parnell. His try against Parnell came when he got away and struggled across the line with "two or three men clinging to him". He was then involved in their next try after a passing movement with Herring. His 4th try of the season came on 19 June in a 19–2 win over eventual champions Northcote. The Auckland Star said that "List was … putting in great work… [and] a brilliant try was scored when List went across under the posts after the ball had passed through five players' hands".

List was then named as a reserve for a New Zealand trial match at Carlaw Park. It was a curtain-raiser for the North Island v South Island clash and part of a programme of representative games to help the New Zealand selectors chose their squad to tour England and Wales. He was then chosen in a B Team trial side to play on 10 July with a Probables – Possibles match played after it. The Auckland Star mentioned that "all the best players will be fielded tomorrow, and the appearance of List (Kingsland) in the B team will please hundreds of followers of the game, who hold he is as good a three-quarter as can be found in Auckland. It will be interesting to see how he shapes tomorrow". List's B Team won 30 points to 28. He scored one of their tries and was said to be one of their "outstanding" backs along with George Wade and Stan Prentice. List missed selection for the New Zealand touring side with the Herald speculating that Jim Parkes "is a weak link, and the inclusion of List would have been preferable".

After 2 more matches for Kingsland in which he scored a try in their round 10 win over Parnell he was selected for the Auckland side to play the New Zealand team before they left. He was picked for the wing but when centre Leonard Riley was unable to play List was moved to centre. Auckland won the match which had a festival type style by 52 points to 32 with List scoring a try. There were 14,000 in attendance at Carlaw Park for the match. He was involved in Maurice Wetherill's try which opened the scoring. He later ran "half the length of the field and when overtaken by Craddock Dufty threw in for Horace Dixon to pick up and score". His try came after a break by Tim Peckham who got the ball to Stan Prentice who passed to List "who beat [Craddock] Dufty with a clever swerve and scored". The Herald saying he "deserved his selection".

The Auckland Star made several criticisms of the New Zealand side chosen to tour, especially in the backs. Saying that "[Ivan] Littlewood, Hickey, and List are, to put it mildly, very unfortunate in not going on tour". Ironically it was the forwards that turned out to be more of an issue with 8 of them refusing to play after a falling out with coach Mair resulting in several backs having to play in the forwards and the offending players later banned for life.

List was then selected for the Auckland squad to train to play Otago on 7 August at Carlaw Park. He played well on the wing, scoring a try in a 14–4 win. His try gave Auckland a 5–2 lead after he received a pass from Payne and scored in the corner. List along with Prentice were said to have "handled the greasy ball in fine style" during the match.

The Auckland Star once again made note of List being unlucky to have not made the New Zealand side saying "List has by now convinced everybody of the quality of his play, also of the fact that all the good players in Auckland are not in the A grade competition". Returning to his Kingsland side he scored 4 tries in a 24–0 win over Otahuhu Rovers at the Auckland Domain on 14 August. A week later in a 21–8 win over Māngere United he scored 2 more tries and set up another for Carter.

Following the match he was named in the 19 man Auckland squad to play Canterbury. He made the final thirteen, playing in the centres in a 33–15 win at Carlaw Park before a crowd of 7,000. He threw the final pass for Wade's try, Auckland's second. Then "at midfield List shot through a gap with Wade trailing in support. The centre drew Canterbury's last line of defence, and then sent Wade across wide out" once more. Early in the second half he took a pass from Prentice and "accelerated the pace of the movement, and although hard pressed, got over at the flag with a couple of Canterbury backs clutching at him". Then later in the match "a long kick saw List and Blazey have a great race for possession, the Aucklander winning by a touch". The Herald said during the following week that "List was the outstanding back on the Auckland side, and his straight running and strong fending were very impressive. Coached on the right lines in the value of co-operating more with the wings, List will develop into a brilliant attacking centre three-quarter".

List returned to the Kingsland side for their match with Northcote. The 2 teams were leading the B Division competition with 2 matches remaining with Northcote holding a 1-point lead. Northcote won to seal the championship with Kingsland finishing runner up. The Herald said that "some good talent was hidden in the ranks of the B section teams. The ability of List, of Kingsland was cited, and it was contended that other players of equal merit only awaited a chance to make good".

List was then chosen for the Auckland side to play South Auckland side from the Waikato on 9 October. Auckland won 25 to 8 before a small crowd of 3,000 at Carlaw Park. List scored 3 tries, the first coming after Allan Seagar dummied past opponents and "then passed to List, trailing in support, for the Kingsland centre to sail in unopposed". A cross-kick by List then gave Wade on the wing a chance through his speed to gain possession and score under the posts. A while later Cleaver "gave a high reverse pass, and List, gathering the ball on the tips of his fingers, put the seal on a splendid bit of collaboration by diving across wide out". Then with still time remaining in the first half he "made a great opening and sailed for the line with Cleaver and Seagar in support. Paki made a game effort to stop the raid, but the ball was sent on for Seagar to score a good try". In the second half a passing movement saw List get the ball from Seagar and "racing on a diagonal line [he] crossed to score wide out". The Herald said that "List was perhaps the best of the [Auckland] three-quarters, and his straight running made his play very impressive".

List then returned to his Kingsland side for their Stallard Cup knockout final match against Parnell on 16 October. Kingsland won by 25 points to 13. List set up a try to Carter and "was playing a fine game for Kingsland… [he then] made a clever opening and again Carter scored".

=== 1927 North Island selection ===
The 1927 season saw List play 13 matches for Kingsland Rovers scoring 2 tries, although the B Division matches did not receive very good newspaper coverage so he may have scored more. Kingsland once again finished runner up, this time behind Ellerslie United. He played 5 games for Auckland, scoring 7 tries which was the most for the representative side. List also made his debut appearance for the North Island representative side.

His season began early, being selected on 12 April to go into training for the Auckland side to play the returning Auckland members of the New Zealand team from their England and Wales tour. The match was played at Carlaw Park on 30 April with the Auckland side winning 24–21 before a crowd of 14,000. List scored a try and the Auckland Star stated that "List, the Auckland centre was very brilliant in attack and his sharp burst of speed, allied to straight running, often penetrated deeply into the New Zealand defense. On the day he showed to greater advantage than B. Davidson…". He "had every opportunity to do well, and his straight running and delightful swerving were good to watch".

This was the only representative match played by Auckland until near the end of the club season. List played 13 games for Kingsland from 14 May to 3 September. In their second match which they won 11–3 against Otahuhu at the Otahuhu Trotting Ground he "gave another splendid exhibition, and he will give Davidson a good fight for the centre three-quarter position in the rep. team". In their team list for their match against Mangere on 28 May Claude's younger brother Francis was also listed in the side with him. Following a 25–0 win over Otahuhu on 9 July the Auckland Star said "the best of the backs was without doubt List at centre. He was always there to seize an opportunity, and also put in some solid defence work. He is about the best three-quarter Auckland has playing league". On 13 August List scored Kingsland's only points in what amounted to the B Division final which was played against top of the table Ellerslie United side. Ellerslie won 9 to 3 at Carlaw Park on the number 2 field with around 7,000 spectators at the venue. After the match the Star wrote that "List of the Kingsland team, is probably the best centre three-quarter in Auckland and both he and Ivan Littlewood, of Ellerslie, had strong claims for inclusion in the last New Zealand team that toured England".

Following a match against Parnell, List was named in an eighteen player squad to tour south for Auckland. The Auckland Star compared his play to that of Craddock Dufty, a superstar of the game at the time, "Dufty and List are the two best centres in sight, although their methods are dissimilar. List is the better type of centre, straight running, unselfish, and clever at catering for his wings. Dufty is a better fullback than a centre, although this season he has consistently been in the three-quarter line". The side was then amended with some players unable to go but the backs chosen were Charles Gregory, Craddock Dufty, Little, List, Joe Wilson jun., Maurice Wetherill, Stan Prentice, and Stan Webb. List played in the first match of the tour against Canterbury at Monica Park in Christchurch before a crowd of 3,000. Auckland won 24 to 13 with List scoring a try. He played on the wing with Gregory playing out of position at centre to accommodate Dufty who played at fullback. The Christchurch Press said that he "is a very determined runner with a gift of getting past tacklers". During the second half Dufty fielded a kick and set his teammates off "for List to evade tacklers, and score in good position". List scored again in their next tour match which was at Victoria Park in Greymouth, on the West Coast. Their opponents were a combined West Coast/Buller side and Auckland won easily by 42 points to 15 before 1,000 spectators. The local newspaper, the Grey River Argus said that "Prentice, Wetherill and List made hacks of our insiders". List was involved in Auckland's first try to Wilson, and then another in the second half to Little then later he nearly put Little in again but instead gained the loose ball after some "very weak tackling" near the line. List was then named in the reserves for the match against Otago, while it appears he did not play in the final match of the tour against Wellington. A full team list was played but there were 7 backs named in the match report and he was not among them.

List was then selected to play in his first ever match for the North Island side to play the South Island. It was commented that "List has proved his claim for a place in big football, and if a New Zealand side were picked this season would probably be sure of a place". List was chosen to play on the wing, with Stan Raynor on the other wing, Maurice Wetherill at centre, and Dufty at fullback. The North Island won the match at Carlaw Park by 13 points to 8 with List scoring a first half try. It came when "Gregory beat at least six opponents with a dazzling run that ended in List racing between the posts". Dufty's conversion gave the North Island an 8–3 lead. Later in the half he made "a determined effort to get over, only to be forced into touch by Blackaby". In the second half he saved a try when "Goodall accepted a pass and he raced for the line, only to be overtaken by List inches from the line". Towards the end of the game he was involved again and "proved a hard man to stop, the B section representative ran strongly for the corner. Pressed by Sullivan he passed to Prentice, who knocked the ball on".

On 8 October List was a part of the Auckland side to play Buller at Carlaw Park. He scored 3 tries in an easy 60–33 victory. Early in the match he "made a brilliant opening, and Wilson's pace carried him over between the posts for Dufty to goal". There was little detailed description of List's three tries as there were so many the newspapers could only be brief. It was later said that "List was too strong for the opposing centre, and his straight running played havoc with the defence".

List and Auckland's final match of the season was against South Auckland (Waikato) on 15 October. Once again he scored a try however this time Auckland was defeated in a shock upset 29 points to 12 at Carlaw Park. In regards to the Auckland backs it was said "of the seven, List was the most convincing for all round play". The Auckland Star said "of the Auckland backs Wetherill and List were the only two who were really impressive". Though the Herald said that he "spoiled a good display by retaining possession after he had raced the wings into scoring positions".

=== 1928 New Zealand debut ===
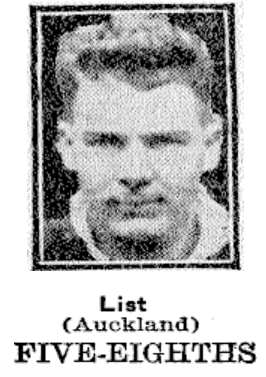

List once again began the season playing for Kingsland. There was very little coverage of their matches in the B Division. He played in 11 of their games but it is unknown if he scored any tries. After their opening round 8–5 defeat by Mangere United on 5 May it was said that "List was the pick of Kingsland's backs and the Auckland representative is in good form for the big matches ahead. He has only to retain his form of last season to be one of the big successes against the English team". Then after a round 5 win over Northcote on 26 May by 9 points to 5 the Star said that "List and Carter were in good form and the pair treated the spectators to some fine football. It was really the good work of these two players that beat Northcote". The following week in a game against Otahuhu on 2 June he injured his knee but played on and it was said that "the crack played a great game on defence, saving his side on numerous occasions" in their 8–3 victory.

The Auckland Star in commenting on representative possibilities said that "for centre three-quarter there are two players of real class in List and Beattie". A week later against Parnell in a 19–10 win "List was a tower of strength for the winner, his straight, powerful running being a factor in Kingsland's success".

List was then selected in the Auckland side to play South Auckland in their opening representative match of the season on 16 June. He was originally chosen for the wing with Len Scott on the other wing and Allan Seagar at centre. But the match day side was adjusted and he played at centre with Scott and Roy Hardgrave on the wings with Seagar moving into the five eighths with Stan Prentice. He scored 2 tries in their 22–3 win at Carlaw Park. His first try came after the entire back line had handled the ball aside from Scott and List went in for "an easy try". Later in the half "pretty in and out passing by the backs and forwards saw List score the best try of the game".

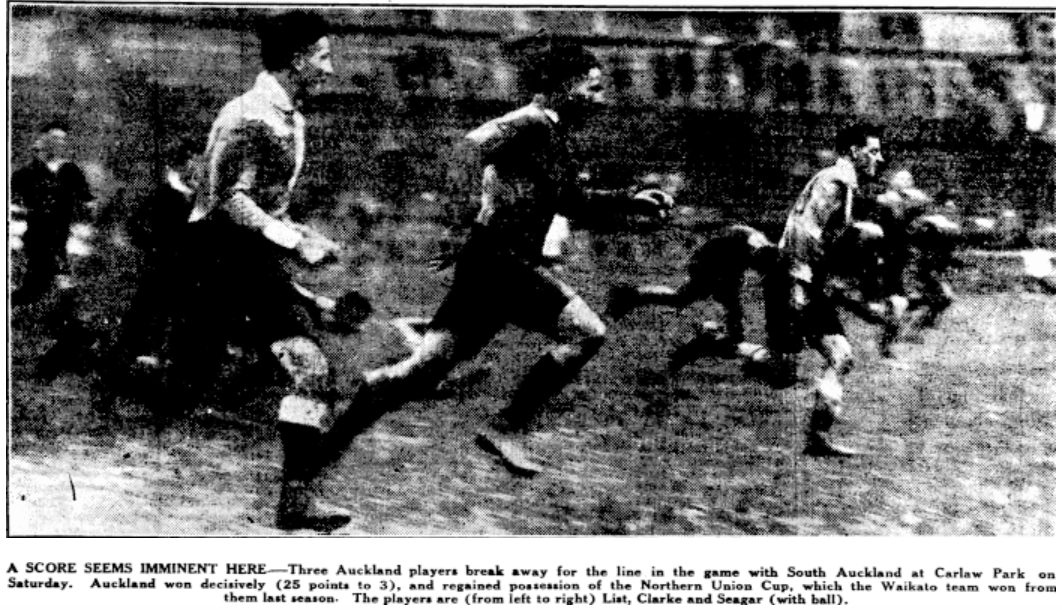

The Herald said List was "a player who caught the eye. He played centre three-quarter and received some bad passes on occasions which he gathered with the ability of a finished player. His strong running was a feature".

He returned to the Kingsland side who beat Mangere on 30 June by 6 points to 3. The Kingsland halves played well and "List was given every chance to operate his splendid swerve. The Auckland rep., was well marked but he was Kingsland's best back". Against Grafton on 7 July in their 8–3 loss he "made some clever openings and was the best back on the ground".

List was then selected in an Auckland Possibles side to play in an Auckland trial. The selectors (Edward Fox, Bert Avery, and Ernie Asher were looking to find the best possible side to play against the England side when was touring shortly after. His Possibles side won 24–14 and he scored a try in the win. It was said that "the wing three-quarters honours were fairly well divided between Hardgrave, List, and L. Scott… List played solidly and well.." The Herald said that he was "easily the best of the wings". His try came after Alf Scott got the ball to Hec Brisbane who passed to List "the wing racing over near the corner". He was then involved in a try to Maurice Wetherill after List "carried it to a few yards from the line" after a passing bout was started by Frank Delgrosso. He next played for Kingsland against Point Chevalier on 14 July in a 19–8 win. "List's strong running and deadly fend was the turning point in Kingsland's favour, and twice the Auckland rep. paved the way for Simms to score. List must be taken hard and low, otherwise the big centre is liable to score tries in the best company".

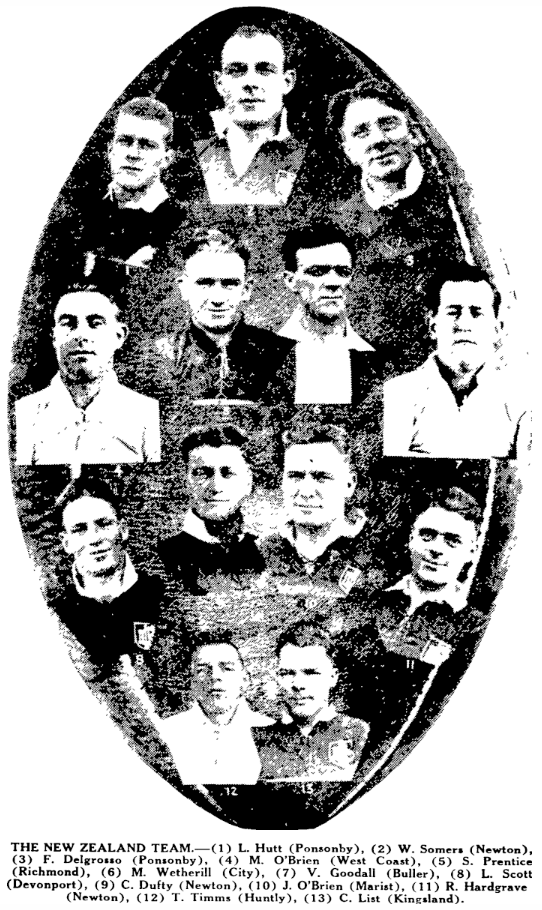

List was then selected to play for Auckland against Canterbury on 21 July at Carlaw Park. He played on the wing with Maurice Wetherill at centre. Auckland won easily 66 to 26 with List scoring twice. Early in the match he "ran strongly on the right wing and when cornered passed to Prentice to go across wide out". Later in the half he repeated the effort with the same result. His first try came in the second half after a "passing run, he wandered across near the posts". Then he "made a dash on the right wing. He passed to Jim O'Brien who returned it, and allowed the Kingsland man to score as he liked". The Auckland Star said that "both List and Hardgrave having the time of their lives yet for the games ahead Wetherill would be better placed at second five eighths and List at centre three-quarter, for good though the latter is on the flank, he is greater inside". The Herald did note however that "List did not put his usual dash into his running and would be well advised to refrain from "Hurdling" an opponent. Although his effort in jumping over the Canterbury fullback was spectacular, the practice is a most dangerous one". List was selected to play for Auckland against South Auckland on 25 July at centre. He scored a try in Auckland's 19–17 loss but was said to have "failed badly at centre". Late in the match with Auckland ahead 17–16 he "passed infield to Dixon when Scott was unmarked". List was only named as an emergency for the North Island side to play the South Island on 28 July. He was however named on the wing for the Possibles in the New Zealand trial match to be played midweek on 1 August. List's Possibles side lost 27–24. In the first half he "raced away from a passing bout, and Longville scored".

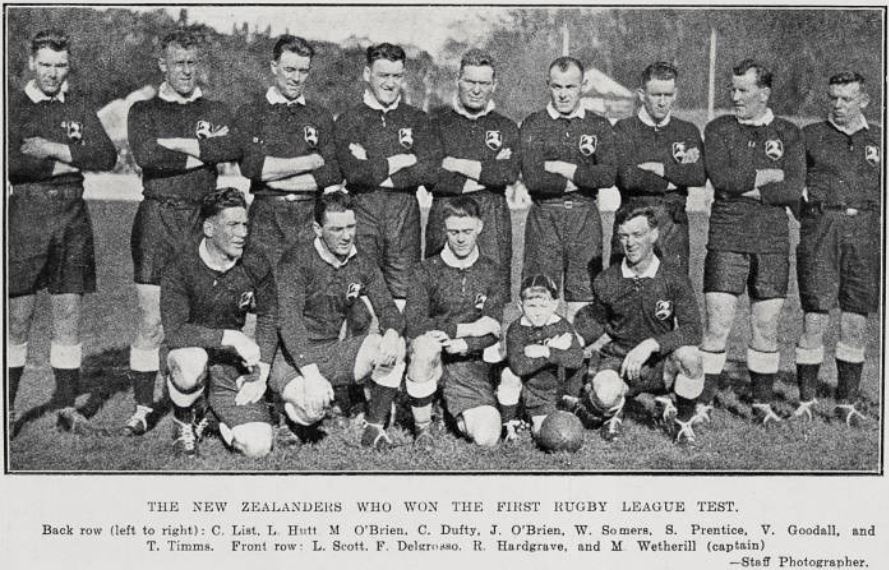
List in the back row on the left of the NZ team at Carlaw Park before the 1st test.

List was then chosen by Edward Fox, W.J. Mitchell, and W Murray, for the New Zealand side to make his national debut in the first test against England on 4 August at Carlaw Park. He thus became the first ever player to gain selection for New Zealand whilst playing for a second division club. He was named in the centres with Roy Hardgrave and Len Scott on the wings, Craddock Dufty at fullback, and Maurice Wetherill and Stan Prentice in the five eighth positions, and Frank Delgrosso at halfback. An all Auckland backline. The Herald said that "List was certainly very fortunate to gain the centre position".

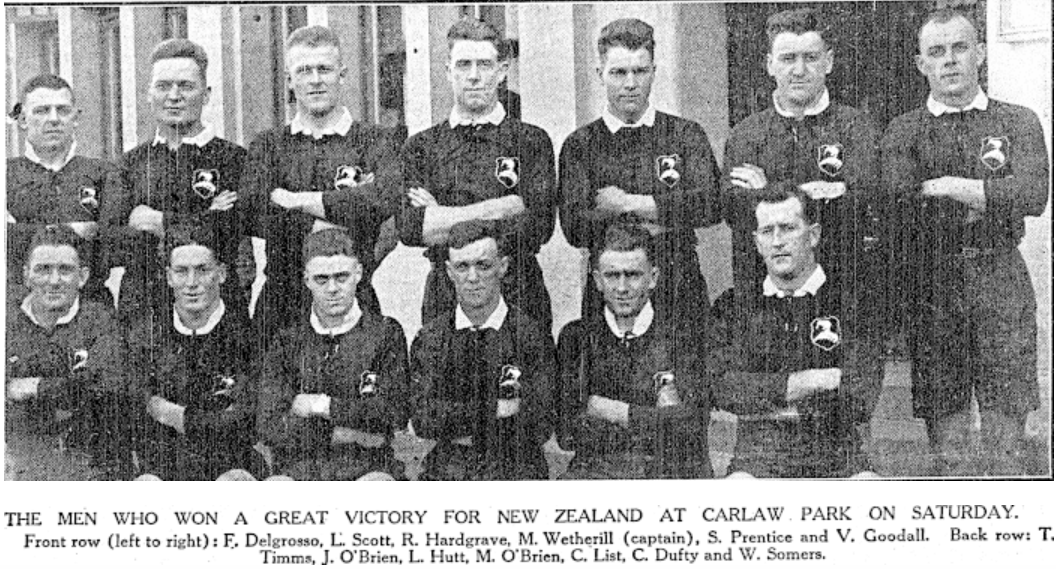

New Zealand won the match 17–13 causing a great upset in front of a crowd estimated at well over 20,000. List scored a try in the win. While New Zealand used the two five eighths system the English played 2 centres and had a solitary five eighth. Their centres opposite List and Wetherill were Jim Brough and Joe Oliver. England had just toured Australia where they won the test series 2–1. With the score 4–0 to New Zealand early in the match "List came into prominence with a good run. He placed a punt nicely and L. Scott beat Askin and Sullivan in a follow through, but the ball went over the dead line". Then with the score 4–3 to New Zealand, England were penalised under their posts. Instead of kicking for goal "Wetherill took the ball, baffled the Englishmen by kicking across to the left flank, where List ran through, gathered the ball cleanly and dived through a tackle to score" with Delgrosso converting the try. With New Zealand leading 11–3 in the second half Wetherill caught the ball standing still "but swept a very wide pass to List. The latter raced on a diagonal line and whipped the ball on to Len Scott. Amid a scene of great excitement, Scott tossed back his head and ran for the corner flag. Askin put in a flying low tackle, but the Shore man kept his feet and amid delirious excitement went across wide out. In comments after the match it was said that "List played to form in the New Zealand centre, and made one of the tries that came New Zealand's way. The English centres, on the other hand, comparatively failed". The Herald said that "List played a sound all-round game at centre".

List was then selected for the Auckland Provincial side to play England 4 days later. He was in the centres, opposite Mel Rosser. The Auckland Provincial side, made up of 12 Auckland club players lost to England 14–9 in front of 15,000 spectators. The Star said "in a subdued light List did well". He was involved in his side's first try when Hanlon cut in and passed to List who "ran to the fullback (Gowers) and sent L. Scott over for a fine try". The Star noted that he "did not handle as well as usual, but was clearly hampered by the failure of the inside men [Hanlon and Amos]". List was then chosen for the Auckland side to play England on 11 August. The side was very similar to the test team with 12 of the 13 players New Zealand representatives at various points. Auckland lost the match 26–15 with 25,000 in attendance at Carlaw Park. List played opposite Jim Brough and Les Fairclough on the English side. Early in the match Frank Delgrosso "worked the blind side from a scrum. List came into the movement and passed to Hardgrave. The fleet Auckland wing short-punted over Sullivan's head and regained possession to touch down for a fine try amid tremendous excitement". Later List intercepted a pass and cleared when England were attacking through Bryn Evans, Billo Rees, and Brough.

List was named as part of a larger three quarter group to play in the second test with one to be omitted. The players were Len Scott, Hec Brisbane, List, and Roy Hardgrave. List was the one who ultimately missed selection and had even been named as a possible starter on match day which was at Caledonian Park in Dunedin. New Zealand lost the match 13 to 5. He was only bracketed for the 3rd test in Christchurch as well and did not make the side with Brisbane, Scott, and Hardgrave chosen. It was not reported why he did not get selected though it is probably that he had an injury. On 8 September in a match for Kingsland against Otahuhu it was said that "List was not in a fit condition to do himself justice, as the New Zealand rep. is still suffering from an injured leg. He nevertheless shone in patches". He only needed to play half the game however as the match was called off by the referee at halftime due to the behaviour of the Otahuhu players and spectators with Kingsland leading 8 to 5.

List had recovered enough to be named in the Auckland squad against Otago the following weekend on 15 September. He ultimately played and Auckland won 42–22. He was involved in Auckland's second try when "the ball went from Delgrosso to Brisbane, to List. The Kingsland centre brought his wing perfectly into position and then swung the pass to send Hardgrave galloping across". Soon after he was involved in another passing bouth with Brisbane and Hardgrave before Brisbane scored. His final game for Kingsland came in their Stallard Cup semi final 18–10 defeat to Grafton Athletic on 22 September. It was reported perhaps rather harshly that "List failed to make an impression. The New Zealand rep. depended upon his fend to make openings. He has no variety for a centre three-quarter".

On 1 October List was selected in the Auckland side to play North Auckland (Northland) on 6 October in Whangārei. Auckland won the match, played at Kensington Park by 33 points to 9. List scored the opening try after a "handling bout". He was then involved in a second half try to Jenkinson after List had made "an opening".

=== Kingsland Athletic and Auckland (1929–30) ===
At the start of the 1929 season List's Kingsland Rovers club merged with Grafton Athletic in an endeavour to be admitted into the first grade competition. Their colours were maroon (Kingsland's colours), with a blue and gold shield and they would be known as Kingsland Athletic. This would be the first time List had played in the first grade in his fifth season of senior rugby league. In an article about the merger the Auckland Star featured a portrait photo of List, although they erroneously said that the Grafton Athletic club (originally named Maritime) was the original Grafton Athletic which had ceased in 1922.

List played 15 matches for Kingsland and scored 7 tries and kicking a drop goal and played 3 matches for Auckland, scoring 2 tries. He scored a try in a practice match against Northcote on 20 April before Kingsland's opening match in first grade against City Rovers at Carlaw Park on 27 April. Kingsland lost the match 21–6 with List scoring one of their two tries. The Herald said that "List was below form and passed wildly at times". Against Devonport a week later at the Devonport Domain he "received the ball only on rare occasions, but gave a great defensive display" in a 29–7 loss. They lost to Newton 12–10 with List setting up R. Carter for a try. He "played well" in the match. Kingsland then secured their first championship point with a 18–18 draw against Marist Old Boys. List was the best of their backs along with Christmas and Angelo. Though the Auckland Star said "List, at centre, played wonderfully in the circumstances and appears to be striking good form". In a heavy loss to Ponsonby List "got through an immeasurable amount of good work". He then scored 2 tries in Kingsland's first win, by 17 points to 5 over Ellerslie. The Star said he was "outstanding, [and] played sufficiently deeply to be able to race up effectively and co-operate with Angelo and Nasey". And that his second try "was a gem, a solo effort in swerving brilliance by which he cut out three defenders and the full-back". He scored another try in a 13–8 loss to City though "lacked opportunities" but still played a great defensive game towards the end. The Herald criticised his play saying "List at centre three-quarter, is certainly a powerful runner, but it is surprising to see a player of his experience hold on to the ball after an opportunity is presented to the wing. Had List passed more often Kingsland may have won comfortably". Against Devonport the following week he set up both of Kingsland's tries in an 18–8 loss.

They then had their second win, 14–10 over Newton on 29 June. He was "perhaps the best of the Kingsland backs, his powerful running paving the way for two tries". He "had little difficulty in beating [Cyril] Brimble, whose defence was weak. The Kingsland centre played his best game this season but will find it difficult to obtain a place as centre in the representative team. With good inside backs List, as a wing, is one of the most dangerous scoring backs in the code". He scored another try in their 25–10 loss to Marist, and played "like a rock" in a 9–0 defeat to Ponsonby.

Then with Auckland representative selection looming List played a great game against Richmond with Kingsland winning 6–0. He scored after he "had taken the ball at his feet, from halfway, and just beat Grace in a spectacular dive". He "played a sound game. His powerful running paved the way for both Kingsland's tries".

List was then selected for Auckland to play against South Auckland on 27 July. Auckland won 11–8 with List overshadowing his opposite, Jackways. He "was at his best in the first half, and his defensive play was excellent". He set up Len Scott's try after he fielded a high kick "splendidly". Though the Herald said he "was not impressive at centre, throwing many wild passes to Scott and Mincham". Returning to the Kingsland side List kicked a drop goal in a 19–7 win over Ellerslie. It was said "List's play was a feature of the afternoon. He was always in the thick of play, his cutting in being brilliant, while he paved the way for two of Kingsland's tries".

He was then picked in the Auckland Auckland training squad to prepare for a match against Northland before being chosen on the wing. He scored a try in Auckland's 22–19 win. "Carter and List, played brightly with limited opportunity and were conspicuous for determined dashes". The Herald said that he "kicked altogether too much to be impressive. The Kingsland wing would be a good scoring player if he had confidence in his undoubted pace and strength". He was chosen in the 22 man Auckland training squad to prepare for their match against Canterbury on 24 August. He was ultimately picked in the side to play on the wing. Auckland won 47–18 before a crowd of 10,000 at Carlaw Park with List scoring the home side's final try. The Herald said that "List showed more determination than in other matches and played really well". His final match of the season was for Kingsland when they were eliminated in the first round of the Roope Rooster knockout competition 9–3 by Marist. He "combined well in the three-quarter line [with Carter] and they were repeatedly conspicuous for strong running". He failed to make the North Island side to play the South Island a week later.

The 1930 season saw List play 14 matches for Kingsland Athletic, and once again he scored 7 tries for them. This placed him equal ninth in the club try scoring list. He only played one match for Auckland out of their three matches. Prior to the start of the season in team previews the Auckland Star said "List is a steady and resolute exponent with plenty of experience". Kingsland lost their opening game to Marist 16–13 but were awarded the victory as Marist had fielded an unregistered player. List was involved in much of Kingsland's attacking work. After their round 2 loss to Devonport List was selected in the 23 man training squad for Auckland's match with Northland. He then played for Kingsland against Newton on 10 May in a 14–8 loss. The Sun said that he "was on form, and his deadly fend proved a regular nightmare to some members of the opposition, but he failed to run straight, and gave his wingers insufficient room in which to work".

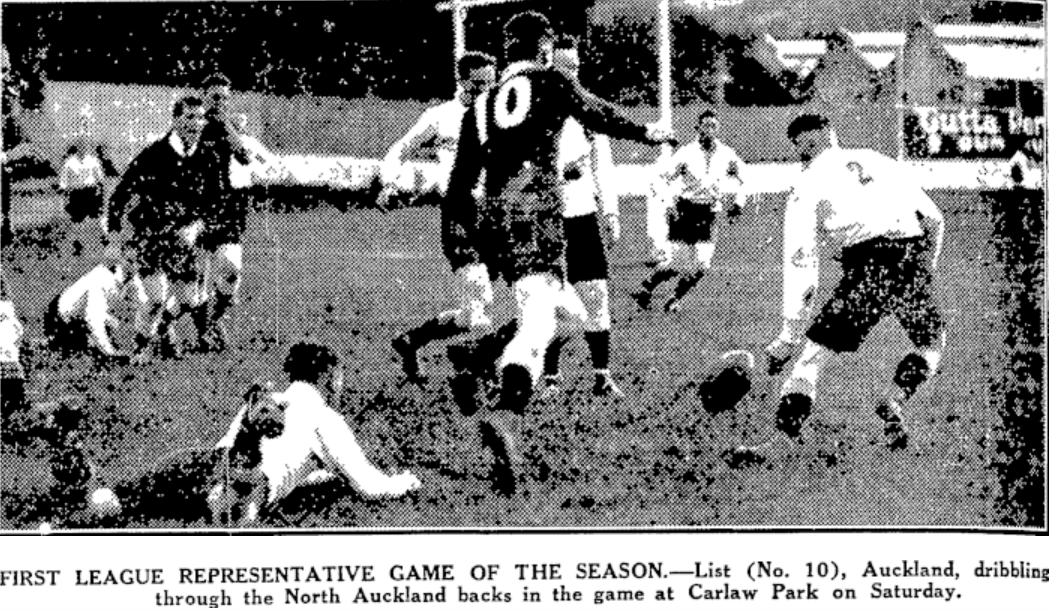

List was then named on the wing for Auckland for their 17 May match with Northland. Auckland won the match 21–16 before a crowd of 8,000 at Carlaw Park. List had a rare poor game and "a weak attempt at tackling by him let Whitelaw, the visitor's right winger, run rings around him", resulting in a try to Dunn. The Auckland Star said "List by no means justified his selection", he "was uncertain in his movements, dropped passes all to frequently, and did not prove a match for his vis-a-vis, Whitelaw". The Sun said "neither List nor R. Carter was very impressive. List seemed to be right off his game. He has been so long at centre that he appeared to be at a loss to know what to do on the wing".

He was "again disappointing" in Kingsland's next match with Richmond on 24 May. He "mishandled at times, but was given few real chances". The New Zealand side was touring Australia later in the season so his poor form was relevant for further rep honours in 1930. He was then omitted from the Auckland side to play South Auckland on 31 May after having been named in a 20-man squad to train prior.

List spent the remainder of the season in the maroon jersey of Kingsland. The following week he scored a try in a 31–10 loss to Ellerslie where he played well but had few opportunities. His play then turned around in a narrow 17–13 loss to City. He "struck his best form and was a tower of strength to his side. It was about his best exhibition this season". Both he and Carter were "outstanding and were responsible to no mean extent for the showing made by their side". List played in matches against Ponsonby, Marist and then Devonport. Against Devonport he scored a try in a 13–6 loss on 12 July at the Devonport Domain. For Kingsland he was "easily the best back. His fine defensive work prevented a heavier defeat. Simms ably led the forwards". He "at centre, was brilliant in patches". List then scored two tries in Kingsland's 13–5 win over Newton. He "gave a glimpse of the form which gained him a place in the Auckland team three seasons ago". The Sun said he "played a strenuous and consistent all-round game on Saturday". In a 18–16 loss to Ellerslie he scored a try and was involved with 2 others. His last two matches of the season came against City Rovers. The first was in an upset 14–13 win against the championship runners up. He scored two of their tries. He was "the pick of the three-quarters". His final match was a week later in a Roope Rooster round one loss to the same opponent by 31 to 13.

=== List joins Marist with Kingsland merger 1931 ===
In 1931 Kingsland was forced to merge with Marist Old Boys. Auckland Rugby League felt that the senior grade had too many teams with 8 and that the competition was weaker than when it had 6 for the majority of the previous 2 decades and as a result was drawing smaller crowds. They also decided to create a reserve grade competition. Kingsland were essentially facing losing their entire playing squad with relegation to a senior B grade so they instead chose to merge with Marist. With Marist able to draw on the best players from Kingsland they were suggested as the early favourites to win the competition. They already had a strong back line with 4 New Zealand representatives and it was said that List "is likely to play back row forward, a position to which he should easily accustom himself".

List scored a try on debut for his 'new team' in an 11–10 win over Richmond Rovers, though the game had gone for longer than it should have and Auckland Rugby League ordered it to be replayed at a later date. His try came 2 minutes after the bell should have been rung and gave Marist the 'win'. It was "a characteristic hard dash and dive when there was little room to manoeuvre in". He crossed the line "amid spectators". Although it was also reported that "List, on the wing, was never prominent until he scored the winning try". The following week in a 20–9 win over Ponsonby List scored another try and kicked a drop goal. He missed their next match through injury. In their round 7 win over Devonport by 11–4 he "repeatedly broke through". Then in an 8–3 win over Richmond List scored another try and was said "to be profiting by the association" with New Zealand international Hec Brisbane in the back line. List scored 2 more tries in Marist's 25–10 win over Ponsonby on 4 July, and then the following week in a 17–9 win over Newton he impressed with his strong runs and he also kicked forcefully". In an 18–10 win over City on 18 July it was said "List at centre was in good form, and took a power of stopping once in his stride. He gave his wingers plenty of room to work in, and sent Pat Meehan over for a try with a well timed pass. List's handling has improved greatly since throwing in his lot with the greens, and he should go close to rep. honours this season". The selection of the North Island team was approaching and the Herald said "[Pat] Meehan and List (Marist) have strong claims as wing three-quarters".

Marist then traveled to Wellington in their bye round to play a Wellington combined clubs side. Marist won 40–19 with List scoring one of their tries at Wellington Show Stadium. He scored another try on 1 August against the combined Ellerslie-Otahuhu. Their final round match against Devonport was to decide the title with the teams tied for first. Marist won 12–5 to claim the 1931 Fox Memorial championship. List "beat Seagar on three or four occasions" during the first half.

List was then selected by Thomas McClymont to make his second appearance for North Island in their inter island match with the South Island. In some remarks by the Herald they said "List is playing in good form at present and deserves a place in the three-quarter line". They also suggested he "has all the credentials of a fullback". The North Island won at Carlaw Park by 52 points to 23. List scored 3 tries at centre, the first coming when he "fended his way through in fine style" before two more in the second half. He was playing opposite Jim Amos who "showed up at centre at times, but was no match for List". He was said to have "played splendid football". List also kicked a second half conversion and was involved in one of Meehan's 4 tries and a try for Abbott. The Herald also said that "List was perhaps the best of the three-quarters. Powerful, straight running makes List a dangerous back".

List then played for Marist against a Lower Waikato side at Steele Park in Hamilton, before being defeated by Devonport in the Roope Rooster semi finals. He set up both Marist tries in their 11–8 loss. He was said to have been "the best back on the ground. His straight running on attack and strong fending paved the way for Marist's two tries. With more of the ball List might easily have given Marist the victory".

That was to be his final game of the season after he suffered an injury. He missed the Stormont Shield final with Devonport which Marist lost. The Star said "it was evident that the losers sadly missed their thrustful and brilliant centre three-quarter, List, who was unable to appear owing to having an injured hand". The Herald said that he had "an injured wrist and it is thought a bone has been broken". He was still however named to practice for Auckland's match against Northland but was ultimately unavailable to play. He also missed the combined Marist-Devonport sides match against the touring Eastern Suburbs from Sydney.

=== New Zealand selection v England ===
The 1932 season was to be the most significant of List's career. For Marist he scored 9 tries which was the most of any player in Auckland. While he also played in all 3 test matches for New Zealand against England. In addition he played for Auckland, an Auckland XIII, and the North Island once more. His season started with 10 matches for Marist which was the entire Fox Memorial first grade championship. Marist finished runner up, 4 points behind Devonport. In the 4th round match against Ponsonby on 21 May he scored 2 tries. He, "on the wing, was one of the best backs". His second try came after following his own kick which gave Marist a 23–12 win. Against Devonport on 28 May in an 11–11 draw he was "easily the best Marist three-quarter. His straight running was a thorn in Devonport's side". In the New Zealand Herald on 15 June an article was written about some backs which could be chosen to play against England on their upcoming tour. They suggested that "backs capable of taking knocks which they will undoubtedly get when opposed by the Englishmen, are necessary. Brisbane, List, Davidson and Seagar are players who have set a high standard in tackling this season and are the type most likely to stop the swift and determined attacks of the visitors". In another draw, against city, 13–13 List "played most brilliantly at centre in the first half, displaying great speed at times". He "essayed several sparkling runs, in which he showed an elusive side-step. The City defence seemed reluctant to tackle low and the Marist three-quarter took advantage of this to exploit a powerful fend with good effect". A week later in a 25–21 loss to Ponsonby "List was the star of the rear divisions, his vigorous straight running and clever moves paving the way for openings, exciting unstinted admiration". List scored a try and was involved in two others, the second when he "raced 50 yards, and passed to McDonald" who scored. He "overshadowed" Brian Riley of Ponsonby, and "was easily Marist's best back. His powerful running penetrated far into Ponsonby's territory. The only blot on his play was an inclination to hold on when the wing could have improved the positions".

Following the end of the championship matches an Auckland XIII team was chosen to play against South Auckland on 16 July with List named in it on the wing. He scored 3 tries in the Auckland sides 29–13 win at Carlaw Park. List was involved in a good early piece of attacking play with Bert Cooke and also involved in their first try when he made a run on the side line and when "cramped for room" placed a centring kick for Brisbane to take it and pass it on to 'Trevor Hall to score. He made another good run but was held up by Whorskey. Later in the first half Cooke put in List for his first try, then in the second half several backs were involved before List went in for the try, then he added a third later in the match as Auckland cleared out.

Following the match List was named in the North Island side. The North Island won the game 27–18 with List scoring a try. His try came with the score 13–9 in their favour after "McIntyre, Brisbane, Cooke and List handled in turn, List who had seen little or nothing of the ball all day, taking a one-handed pass and racing over to score". It was said that his "chances were restricted, he being starved in the first half, while in the second half he did not see a great deal of the ball, but when he did he made the best use of it".

==== First Test (Auckland, 30 July) ====
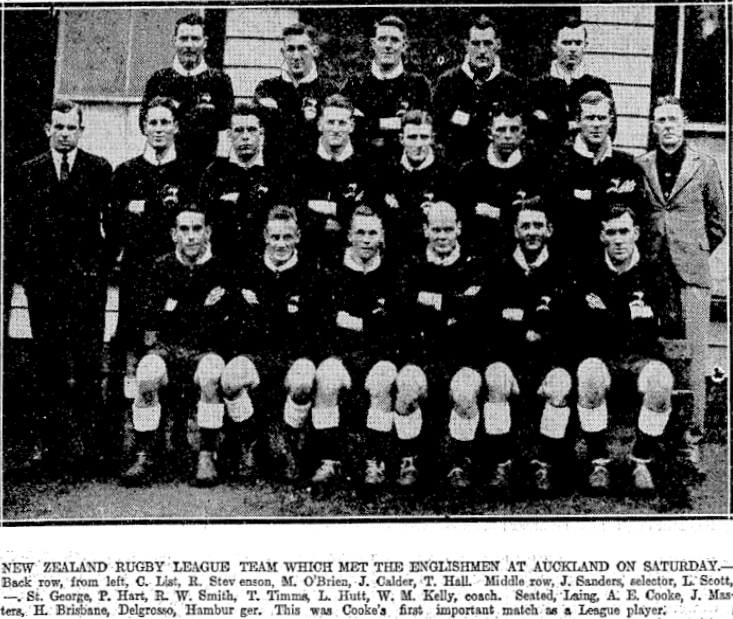

Following the inter-island match List was selected in a group of Auckland players to prepare for their match against England on 6 August. Three days later he was named in the New Zealand team to play England in the first test, four years after he had made his test debut. He was chosen in the centres with Dick Smith and Len Scott on the wings, Albert Laing at fullback, and Hec Brisbane and Bert Cooke in the five eighth positions. List was matched up with Alf Ellaby and Artie Atkinson in the centres for England.

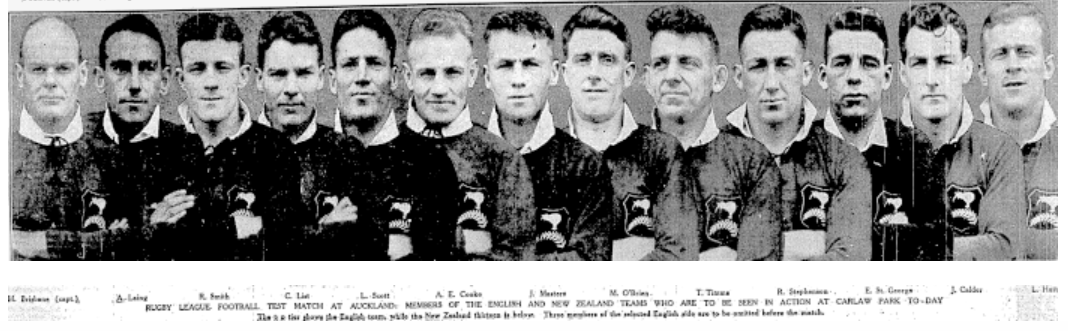

New Zealand was outclassed in the match at Carlaw Park by 24 points to 9 in front of 25,000 spectators. Early in the match List was obstructed while England was on attack by Atkinson and New Zealand were awarded a free kick. The Star wrote after the match that "but for magnificent collaboration by Brisbane, Cooke and List, each of whom tackled with admirable tenacity, the visitors might have piled up scores, for neither our wingers nor the fullback were equal to the occasion". Despite the New Zealand side struggling, List did enough to retain his place in the second test to be played at Monica Park in Christchurch.

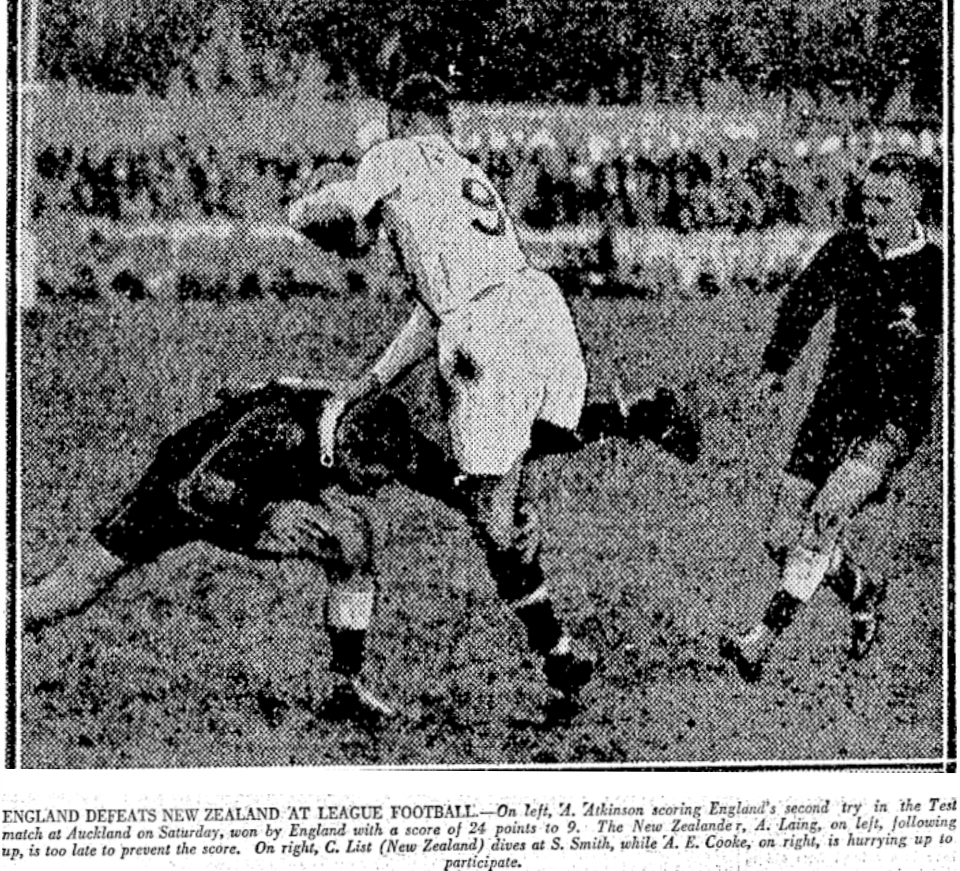
Claude List tackling Stanley Smith in the first test at Carlaw Park, with Bert Cooke approaching.

Prior to the second test List was selected to play for Auckland against the touring side on the wing. His weight was reported as 12 stone, making him the largest of the Auckland backs which had an average weight of 11st 3lb. List played on the wing opposite Stanley Smith. Auckland played well but lost 19–14 before a crowd of 15,000 at Carlaw Park on 6 August.

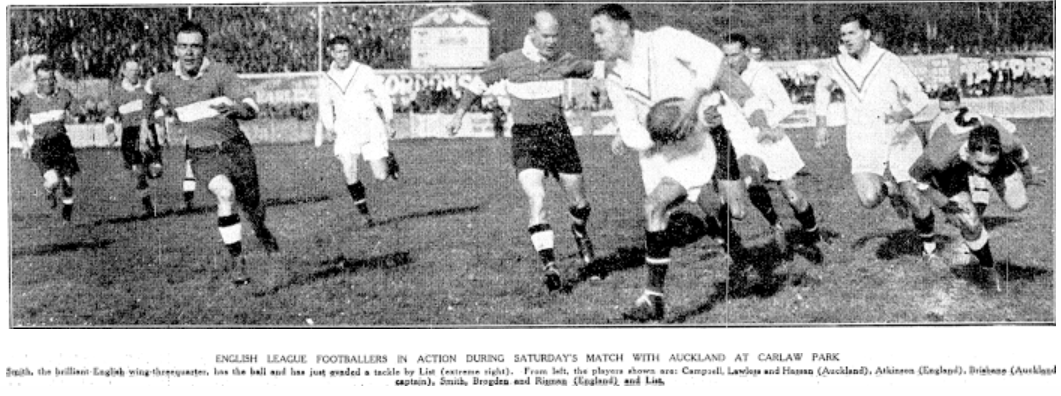
List (#2) has just missed tackling Stanley Smith in Auckland's match against England at Carlaw Park on 6 August

The Star said that "Cooke was always prominent, capably supported by Brisbane and List". With England leading 3–0 early in the match a passing bout occurred "between Hassan and Davidson" before List received the ball with a chance to score but he was "thrown into touch". During the second half with England leading 13–2 "a roar of delight went up when List, following up a long kick by Cooke, raced down the sideline. Davidson was on the inside to receive and score easily" "amid great excitement". After this "Auckland's rear guard was now making the play", and List made a "dangerous plunge for the line" but just failed to score. The Herald wrote "Cooke again played a fine game, and Hassan, List and Davidson were also in good form".

==== Second Test (Christchurch, 13 August) ====
List then traveled with 10 other Aucklanders down to Christchurch to join the rest of the New Zealand squad for the second test. Changes were made to the New Zealand back line with Puti Tipene Watene named at fullback, List moved to the wing, Brisbane and Cooke in the centre positions, Ben Davidson on the other win, Wilf Hassan at five eighth, and Edwin Abbott at halfback.

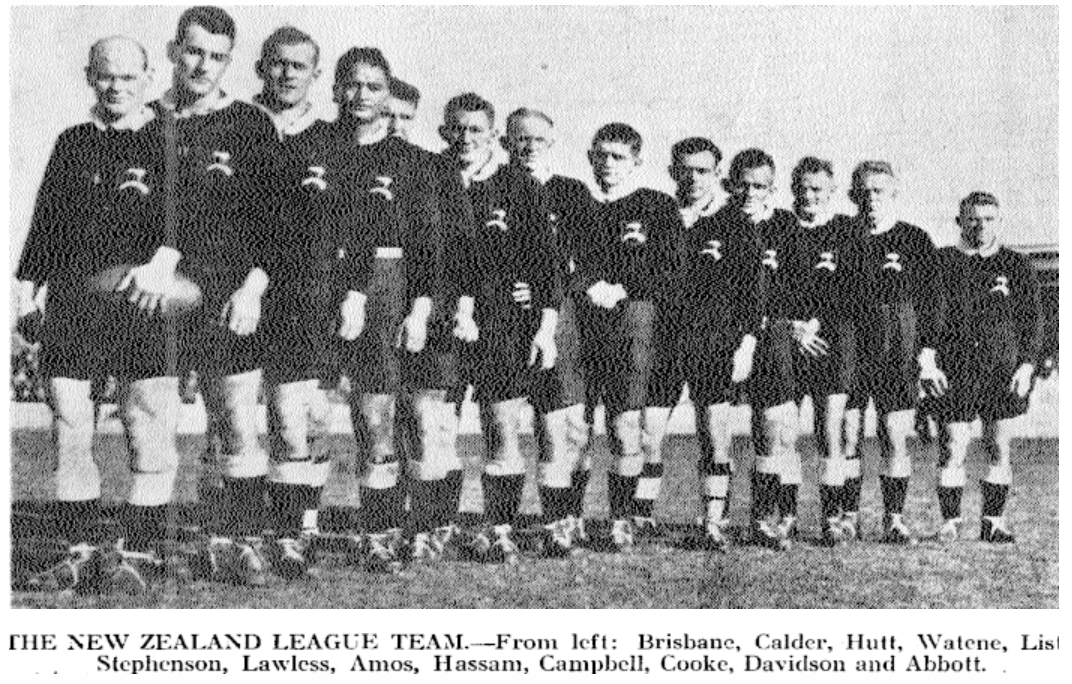
List in the second test team, 5th from the left.

List was playing opposite English winger Stanley Smith once more. New Zealand lost 25 to 14 before 5,000 spectators. List scored both of New Zealand's tries. Early in the match "Cooke, following up a New Zealand kick very fast, caught Sullivan with the ball. From the ensuing play, the ball was whipped out to Brisbane, who made a good opening. List topped off the movement with a good try in the corner". Still in the first half with England leading 10–5 Abbot secured the ball, "made ground and passed to Hassan, the five eighths swung outwards, drew Sullivan and gave a well-timed pass to List, who clapped on the pace and dived across as he was tackled by Risman". The try was converted by Jim Amos to level the score 10–10. With the score 25–14 late in the match "Cooke came close to sending List in on the right flank".

==== Third Test (Auckland, 30 August) ====
List was named in the New Zealand side to play the third test at Carlaw Park on 20 August. List was once again on the right wing, opposite Barney Hudson. New Zealand lost the final test 20–18 after leading 18–17 with a minute to go before 12,000 spectators. List tackled well in the first half along with other New Zealand backs. At one stage he kicked well to get good field position and after New Zealand was awarded a penalty Watene kicked a goal to open the scoring.

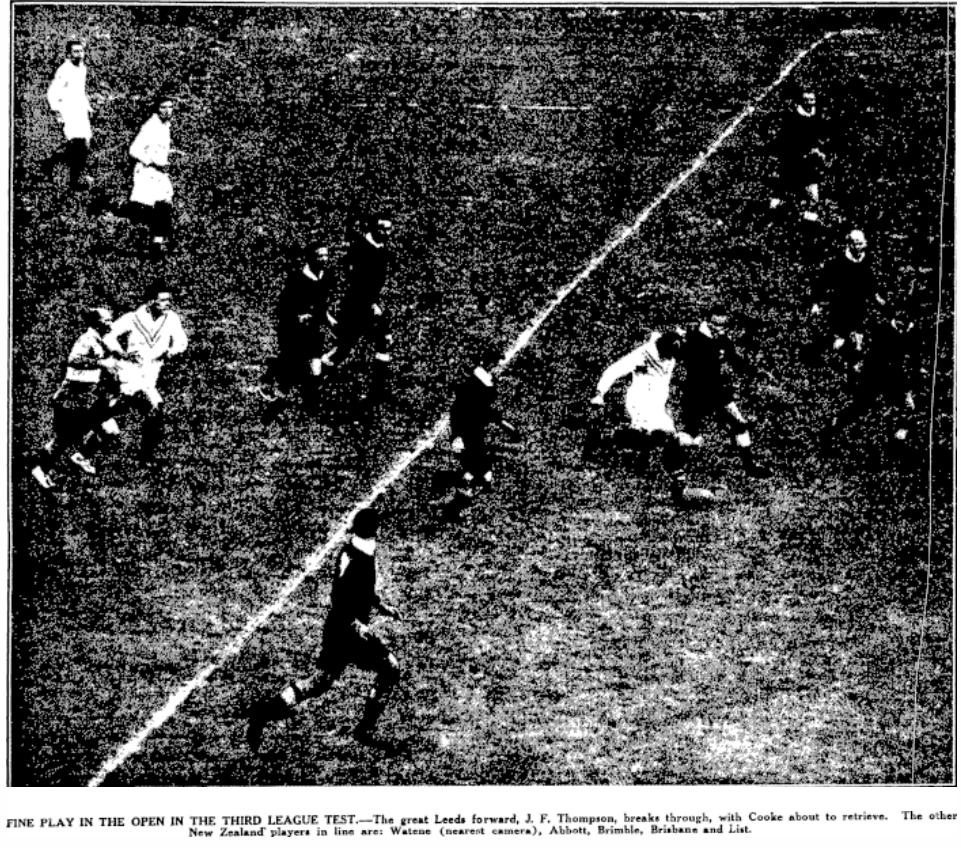
List covering on the extreme right of the picture with Bert Cooke contesting a kick ahead by Joe Thompson.

After the match the English financial manager, Mr. R.F. Anderton made several comments about the New Zealand side including saying that he was "impressed with Cooke, Brisbane and List. These players are worthy of inclusion in any international side".

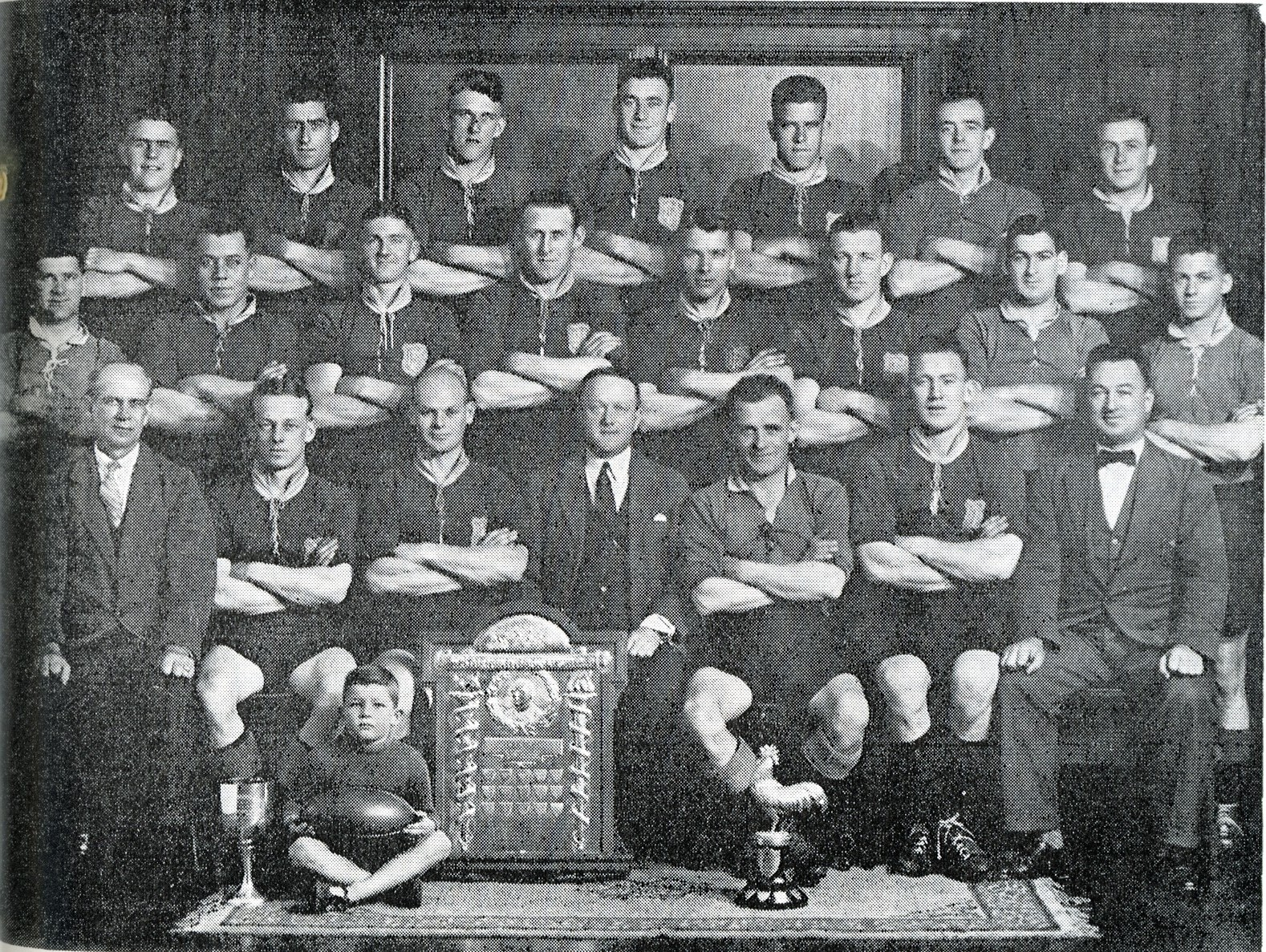
Marist in 1932 (Roope Rooster and Stormont Shield winners). List is 4th from the right in the middle row.

With the English tour over List returned to his Marist side to finish the season. He played in their semi final win in the Roope Rooster over Devonport on 3 September. He scored a try and his play along that of Schultz "was a feature of the match". A week later Marist met City in the final and comfortably won 28–8 with List scoring a remarkable 4 tries. His first try came after Cornthwaite put him in under the posts, then Brisbane beat the defense and passed to List who scored again, then after a passing bout in the second half he got his third, before his last try late in the match after Webberley had made an error for City. Marist then met Devonport in the Stormont Shield final on 17 September. Marist won their second trophy in as many weeks with a 15–8 win, with List scoring yet again. On 3 October Marist travelled to New Plymouth to play Taranaki, going down 25–17. They then had a 37–8 win over Ponsonby in a Max Jaffe Cup charity match on 8 October. List scored 2 tries and kicked 2 rare conversions. His final game of the season came in another charity match between Marist and a 'rest of Auckland' side on 17 October. He score 2 more tries in Marist's 27–16 win.

=== Continuation of Marist and Auckland ===
In 1933 List played 21 matches for Marist and scored 6 tries and kicked 1 conversion. He also played 3 matches for Auckland and scored a try. These were to be the final representative matches of his career despite playing senior club football for a further 9 seasons. List was aged 30 by this point of his career. Following a 3rd round win over Ponsonby it was said that "List, at centre, was weak, dropping many passes, while also giving poor transfers". The following week against Newton in an 11–6 win he "played a very solid game, and his only fault, if any, was that he did no give L. Schultz the opportunities the winger might have expected". He "played his best game this season, handling the ball well, while his strong running was reminiscent of the player of past seasons". then in a loss to City on 3 June he was said to be the best back along with Wilf Hassan for Marist.

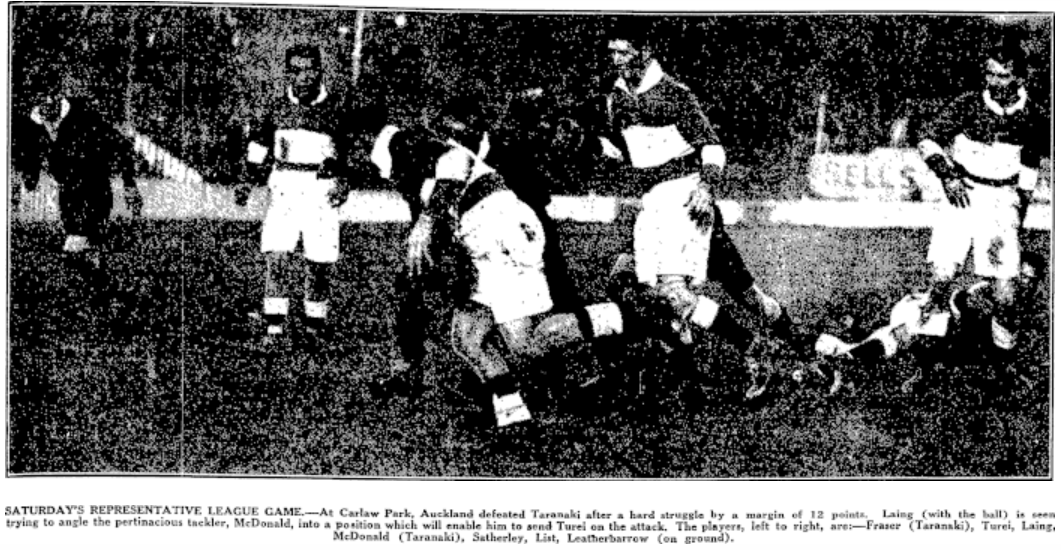

List was then selected for Auckland's first representative match of the season against Taranaki. The New Zealand Herald was blunt with their assessment saying "List, Marist, seems to have lost all form and is lucky to gain a place. Last season the marist centre was an outstanding success against the Englishmen. It is evident the selectors are relying upon past form". He was picked at centre with Bill Turei and Roy Bright on the wings, with Albert Laing at fullback. Auckland won the match 32–20 at Carlaw Park before a crowd of 10,000. List was said to have not given Turei good passes and "was inclined to go too far before getting rid of the ball, but he was solid in defence". The Herald said it was List's "best game this season". In a 35–9 win over Devonport for Marist on 17 June List scored 3 tries and kicked a conversion. The Star said "for the first time this season List was well in the firing line, proving to some of his critics that he has the quality of a good centre. Two of his tries were the best he has produced for quite a long time". Then a week later in a win over Ponsonby he scored 2 more tries and "gave a good display, right up to his best form".

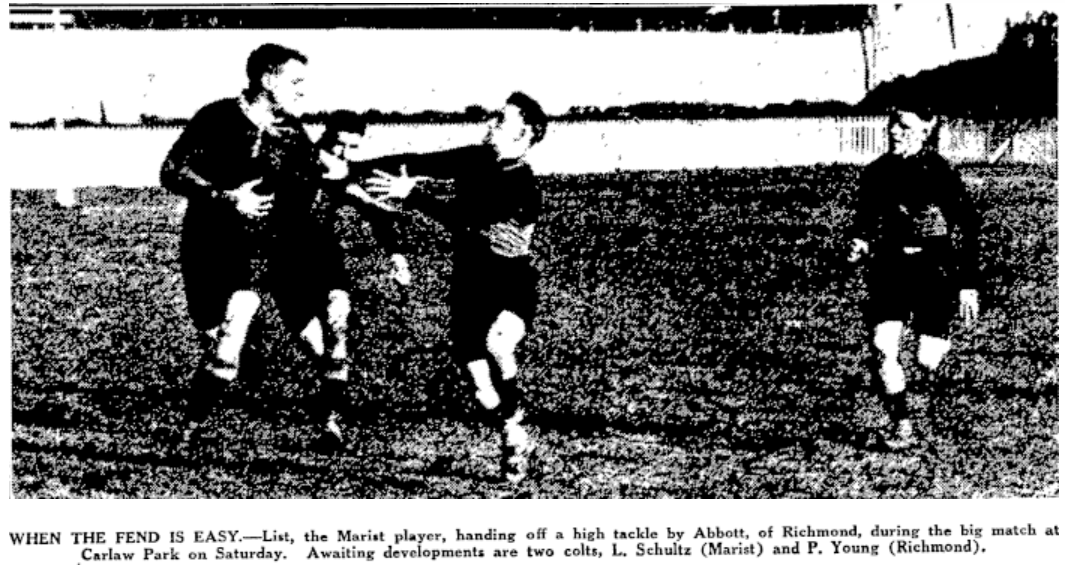
List fending off Edwin Abbott of Richmond in Marist's match on 5 August

In mid-June List was selected for Auckland's second match of the season when they played South Auckland on 15 July. South Auckland caused an upset, winning 14–0. The "Auckland backs made desperate efforts in the fading stages to get some satisfaction, and in this Brisbane, List and Len Schultz featured, but it was all in vain" in muddy conditions. He then returned to the Marist side and scored a try in a win over Ponsonby on 29 July. Marist had finished runner up in the championship to Devonport, and then finished runner up to Newton in the Challenge Cup competition played over 5 rounds. In their loss to Newton on 19 August he was the "best of the three quarters, and there is no doubt that when he shows his best form he is the best in club football".

List had missed selection for the Auckland side in matches against Taranaki, North Auckland, West Coast, and Hawke's Bay but was chosen in the reserves in their final match of the season against South Auckland on 9 September. During the first half Bert Cooke was injured and retired from the match with List coming on to replace him and move to the wing. He missed a try when Stan Prentice had made a break but threw a pass at List's feet which saw him kick it dead. Then before halftime "Hassan got his backs away with dispatch, and rapid handling by Schultz and Brisbane enabled List to fly across out wide" to give Auckland a 9–2 lead. The Auckland Star said "List did well when he came on for wing duty". List had played in the curtain-raiser for Marist against Devonport in a challenge cup competition match and so ended up playing over 3 halves of football.

Following a match against Ponsonby the Marist side played against the touring St. George side from Sydney who had finished runner up in the 1933 New South Wales rugby league competition. Before a crowd of 13,000 at Carlaw Park Marist won 25 to 11. List played on the wing and marked Len Brennan who was later killed in World War 2 aged just 32. He then finished the season with a Max Jaffe Cup match against Richmond and an unemployed charity match against the same opposition on 21 October as New Zealand was in the midst of the Great Depression.

=== Falling out with Marist and transfer to Mount Albert ===
The 1934 was an unusual one for List. He only played 3 matches for Marist and transferred to Mount Albert United late in the season where he only played one match before the season end. At the start of the season it was reported that he was available to play again but he was not named in their early season matches. Early in the season Marist were struggling for players with some playing for their reserve grade side and the senior side on the same day. List then came out of 'retirement' and had his season debut in their round 3 match against City Rovers on the same day the new grandstand was opened at Carlaw Park. They lost 18–5 and List was said to be "far from his best, judging by this exhibition". He played better against Devonport a week later and scored a try in a 22–13 loss to Newton on 26 May. However it was reported that he "played listlessly, his one real sparkle being the opportune try he obtained before the final whistle" on the left wing.

It was then reported that there were several senior players at Marist who were in a dispute with the club over financial issues. They included C. Dunne, Des Herring, Gordon Campbell, Wilf Hassan, brothers Len, Bill and John Schultz, and List. The club released an official statement on 8 June saying "that several committee members and some players were dissatisfied on a point of club finance, whether portion of expenditure should apply to senior players alone or be devoted to general club services, including juniors…Apparently this caused the eight players mentioned to attempt to embarrass the club by adopting an attitude of passive resistance…". The eight players were then asked to appear at the club's executive meeting the following week.

List was named in the reserves for a match on 9 June but did not play, and then most of the players were suspended by the Marist club. The Auckland Rugby League had declared that the suspensions were "out of order" but the Marist club appealed to New Zealand Rugby League and they upheld the suspensions. List was one of those suspended. The New Zealand Council then said that the 4 who had been suspended (Wilf Hassan had left to join Marist rugby already) could apply for a transfer. However the Marist club refused to grant them permission. List then did not play for months through the suspension before eventually being granted a transfer in August to Mount Albert United who had been in existence since 1928 but had been a lower grade side in the following years. Several of his fellow suspended players followed along with G. Flannagan. Mt Albert had been seeking senior grade status and they were allowed to enter a team in the Roope Rooster along with the Papakura club. Mount Albert lost the match 19–11 to Ponsonby on Carlaw Park #2 field on 18 August. List "at centre performed well apart from faulty handling on one or two occasions".

The 1935 season saw List play the entire season for Mount Albert, playing 15 games and scoring 4 tries, and kicking 1 conversion. He was now aged 32 and moved into the forwards, playing lock in their opening match against City on 27 April. The following week against Richmond in a 27–15 loss his tackling was mentioned along with other forwards. They then had a high scoring 22–22 draw with Newton on 11 May. For Mount Albert in a "hard working pack Flanagan, Gunning, Shiro and List were frequently prominent and were always dangerous when handling the ball". After 3 further matches he then scored his first points for Mount Albert in a 27–14 win over City Rovers on 15 June. He scored 3 tries and kicked a conversion in the win in the match which was played at Onehunga. Interestingly a week later after a 5–3 win over Richmond the New Zealand Herald said List "was but a shadow of the player of two or three seasons ago". A week later he was moved back to centre and was involved in the only try of the match which Mount Albert won 3–0 over Newton. List was said to have "showed a distinct improvement and gained useful ground by strong, straight running". Against Devonport on 13 July he "played fairly well at centre". On 20 July in a 18–6 win over Marist he scored a try and was "in form at centre for Mount Albert, and frequently showed up for solid running". Although he "spoiled a good game by dropping passes when tries looked possible". Against Ponsonby in round 14 List was forced into the forwards when Richard Shadbolt was injured and List then played well there. Following the match, won 17–11 by Mount Albert it meant that they were tied in their inaugural first grade season with Richmond for the championship after the last round. A final was required to find the 1935 champion between the two sides on 10 August. Mount Albert lost the match 15–9 at Carlaw Park. The Auckland Star said "List was always going great guns at centre for Mount Albert, his one failing being weak handling at times". Both List and Schultz proved "tough nuts to crack" for Ted Mincham in the centres for Richmond.

In the Roope Rooster knockout competition he was in an 18–15 win over Marist. It was a bad tempered match due to Mount Albert having several former Marist players including List who was said to have been prominent. This was his last match of the season as he did not play in any of Mount Albert's remaining matches.

=== Mount Albert seniors and reserves ===
The 1936 season marked the beginning of a period of several years where List began to play a mixture of senior and senior reserve grade matches for Mount Albert. In 1936 he played 8 senior games, scoring 2 tries. He began the season playing 2 games for their top side and in the second against Devonport on 9 May he "did well with limited opportunities".

At this time Claude's brother Francis was named in the Mount Albert reserve grade side. Through the remainder of the season Claude was named in the first grade side in some weeks but not others. On 30 May he was named to play Manukau who had rejoined the competition after years absence. Mount Albert won 23–18 over the eventual champions in Manukau. List was said to have "showed up for powerful bursts on occasions". The following week in a 21–18 loss to City List scored his only points of the season for the first grade side, 2 tries. Over the remainder of the season he played in senior grade matches against Marist on 13 June, Manukau on 1 August and Marist on 12 September, either not playing in the other 6 matches or else playing for their reserve grade side.

1937 saw List playing the entire season in reserve grade. In a 12 June match he was listed in the reserves with his brother Francis. In 1938 he again began the season in reserve grade with his brother Francis. By this point in his career he was 36 years old and had been playing senior rugby league for 14 seasons. On 10 June he was named in their 11 June round 9 side to play Papakura at Carlaw Park. This was possibly the first time that both List brothers played together in the senior side. Claude was involved in a try to Bert Leatherbarrow while "F. List, a junior … did good work in the forwards". A week later in a 10–8 win over Ponsonby, Francis scored a try but Claude was not "impressive" on the wing with Campbell the Ponsonby wing beating him for a try. Claude was playing right wing three-quarter but was playing closer in to the forwards and was involved in his brothers try, making a run before passing to Wilson who passed to Bert Leatherbarrow who sent it on to Francis to score. After the match it was suggested he should move back to the wing. The following week against Newton, in an 18–13 win he was involved in a try to Jack Tristram after List had first passed to Ernie Pinches. In a 9–3 win over North Shore the next weekend the Herald said that List, "the veteran international, can still make his presence felt, and he was hard to stop. His all round play on the wing was good". He then spent a few weeks in the reserves before again playing for the senior side on 13 August against City in a 28–13 win on Carlaw Park #2. He set up Wilson and McNeil's tries with "strong running" beating the City backs twice. He along with Wilson were said to be Mount Albert's "outstanding backs" with Lists "straight running a good feature of their back play".

In the final round of the competition Mount Albert beat Papakura 44–12 but they needed a Marist loss to force a playoff for the championship. With Marist winning 10–7 it meant Mount Albert was runner up. It was his final first grade match of the season. He "showed plenty of dash at centre". He was playing in the backline with fellow New Zealand internationals Clarry McNeil and Roy Hardgrave. His final match of the season was Mount Albert's reserve grade final loss to Richmond 16–10 where he was up against George Tittleton, another former New Zealand international.

The 1939 season saw List play the year in the reserve grade competition. Mr. Huxford awarded List a trophy for services rendered at the annual general meeting on 20 February, while his brother Francis won the award for the most consistent forward. Claude also win the C. Elwin Memorial Cup for the annual 100 yards championship. He again spent the 1940 season entirely in the reserve grade.

=== Mount Albert during the war ===
With the war having begun during the 1939 season many senior sides were struggling for adult players. The reserve grade competition ceased and many veteran players were called back into action for their former sides. The 1941 season saw List once again resume his senior playing career for Mount Albert. He played 19 games and scored 2 tries at the age of 39, now in his 17th season of senior football. An unprecedented period of time at that level in Auckland rugby league through its early decades.

List played in their round 1 match against Marist List was playing in the forwards and was said to be "prominent" in their 20–18 loss. In their next match against City he again played "well among the forwards". In an 11–10 win over Newton on 7 June List "was a tower of strength among the forwards, and Shadbolt and Tristram gave good support". He played another "good game" in Mount Albert's 13–8 win over Richmond on 21 June. He put in another strong performance against the heavy Manukau forward pack in a 14–5 loss on 28 June. Before being described as a "hard toiler" in their 30–8 defeat to North Shore on 5 July. List was next mentioned after a 10–6 loss to Ponsonby on 16 August in round 14, doing "good work among the Mount Albert forwards". While he showed "good form a week later against North Shore.

A short article then appeared in an Auckland Star supplement on 6 September about List's career. It said "few, if any, players in the rugby league code can boast a playing record of 29 years continuous football. This goes to the still fit and active Claude List, who in turn shines as a back, or a forward, for Mount Albert. List made his debut in the league code in Auckland for the old Kingsland club in 1921, and since then he has gained both New Zealand and Auckland representative honours. He first got into an Auckland team in 1927, and actually was picked to represent New Zealand in 1928, while still a senior B grade player… His greatest success came in 1932 when he played all three tests for New Zealand against England. At Christchurch, in the second match, with A.E. Cooke badly hurt, Claude played the greatest game of his career. Many times his powerful fend came into action, and he stood out as the best of the New Zealand backs. Jim Sullivan, the English captain, reckoned that List was next to A. E. Cooke, the most dangerous attacking back his team had met in the Dominion, besides which his tackling was always a great asset. Claude first played football for a league team in Queensland as a schoolboy in 1912. Nearly every Saturday List can be seen at Carlaw Park giving assistance, and he is still up to the best first grade standard".

His first try of the season came in a 10–6 Roope Rooster round 1 loss to Marist on 20 September. In a Phelan Shield win over Newton on 4 October he "ably led the attack" along with Bert Leatherbarrow and Jack Tristram. The in a 21–12 win over North Shore in the semi-final of the Phelan Shield he scored his second try of the season. They then defeated Richmond in the final 8 points to 6 with List "playing well" in the forwards.

The 1942 season was to be List's last. Due to the reduction in senior players the Auckland Rugby League made the decision to combine several of the sides during the middle of the war. Mount Albert was merged with Newton Rangers and ultimately finished 4th of the 6 sides. List did not play their initial matches but made his season debut on 6 June in their round 4 match with Manukau. They lost 10–5 with the Auckland Star reporting that "the Newton-Mount Albert XIII against Manukau was strengthened by the addition of H. Leatherbarrow, international hooker, and C. List. Both are experienced Mount Albert forwards". Against Richmond on 6 June he was a "prominent forward" in a 23–17 win. He played a match against Ponsonby on 13 June and then it appears that the final game of his career came on 20 June against the City-Otahuhu side. For the final time in his career he was said to be "prominent" among the forwards in the 16–10 win. List was not mentioned in any of their remaining games and retired from the sport that he had played for 30 seasons.

== Personal life and death ==
After initially living in Glen Eden when the family moved to New Zealand they soon moved into the inner city suburbs. In 1928 List was living at 141 Newton Road, Auckland and was working as a mechanic according to census records. In 1931 he married Iris (Margrey) Thornburn on March 25 at St. Matthew's Church in Auckland. They had one son, Trevor Henry Wilchefski, born on 29 December 1932. In 1935 they were living on Paget Street in Freemans Bay, before moving to Hepburn Street in Ponsonby in the late 1930s throughout the 1940s. In 1949 they had moved to Pollen Street in Ponsonby where they lived until the mid-1950s before moving to Main Rd in Silverdale in the late 1950s.

Claude died on 17 April 1959, aged 56.
