= Kingsland Rovers =

Defunct NZ rugby league club, based in Auckland

Kingsland Rovers Football Club
Club information
- Short name: Kingsland
- Colours: Kingsland Rovers: Red, later changed to Maroon Kingsland Athletic: Maroon, with a blue & gold shield & "K.A." monogram
- Founded: 1920
- Exited: 1929

Former details
- Grounds: Kingsland Ground; Victoria Park; Auckland Domain
- Coach: Bert Avery
- Competition: Auckland Rugby League

Records
- Myers Cup (4th Grade): 1921
- Stallard Cup (B Division knockout): 1926

Kingsland Rovers was a rugby league club in Auckland. They competed from 1920 to 1928 under the name Kingsland Rovers for 9 seasons before amalgamating with Grafton Athletic in 1929 to become Kingsland Athletic, before the club was 'forced' to join with Marist Old Boys in 1931.

== History ==
=== Kingsland Rovers 1920 ===
The Kingsland club was registered by the Auckland Rugby League at their weekly meeting on 16 April 1920, and was named “Kingsland Rovers”. The club was based in Kingsland, a central Auckland suburb. They fielded teams in the 3rd and 4th grades. At the 5 May meeting it was reported that a ground had been secured for matches at Kingsland near Western Springs and was available for the beginning of the season.

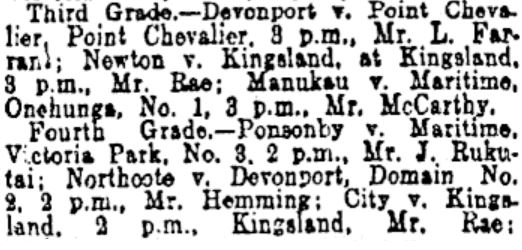
Their first scheduled games which were ultimately abandoned due to the poor condition of the newly cleared Kingsland ground.

Their first official games were supposed to be on the Kingsland ground on 8 May, with the 3rd grade team playing Newton Rangers at 3 pm, and the 4th grade team playing City Rovers at 2 pm. However the referee (Mr. Rae) of the first game found that the ground was in such a poor condition that the game could not proceed. The meeting on the following Wednesday received a letter of protest from the City Rovers club “against the condition of the Kingsland ground … the match abandoned, the referee refusing to allow the game to go on, so bad was the condition of the ground. It was reported that the sum of 30/ had been paid for clearing the ground”. Ultimately their ground was not approved for play and all of their matches were played at grounds around Auckland. The following week the 3rd grade team played Point Chevalier at Walker Park in Point Chevalier, with the 4th grade side having a bye. The 3rd grade result was not reported, and their first reported score came in the 3rd round, where they fell to a 15–5 loss to Devonport United (North Shore Albions) on their opponents Devonport Domain ground. Only one other result for their third grade team was reported during the season, a 12–2 loss to Manukau on 29 May. Their 4th grade side also had many results not reported though 5 were. They lost 4 of their matches but on 26 June they recorded possibly the clubs first ever win when they beat Northcote 12 to 3 at the Auckland Domain on the #2 field.

Towards the end of the year the club held a Euchre and Dance evening at St. Benedicts Hall, East Street on 10 September at 8 pm. The street was later renamed St Benedict's Street and is located in Newton. Proceeds from the evening were to go to a club member who was in hospital. Their secretary for the season was Henry Fox Ludgate, an Australian who had moved to Auckland in the early 1900s. During the year they had held regular fortnightly Euchre and Dance evenings at the same location.

=== 1921 (Growth to 4 Teams, Third Grade champions) ===
On 23 February 1921 the Kingsland club held a meeting at Hirst's Hall in Morningside. They held another meeting on the evening of 10 March at the Scout Rooms in Kingsland, with “all members and intending members requested to attend”. Their honorary secretary at the time was J. Ball. The club fielded teams in the 3rd grade, 4th grade, 5th grade, and 6th B grade with their 3rd grade team winning the championship. The 1921 season saw Kingsland's ground now available for use with the 3rd grade side drawn to play there against Newton Rangers in a preseason match on 30 April. Relatively few scores were reported during the season once more however following a 14–3 loss to Newton on 23 July in round 11 it was stated that Newton had now drawn within 1 point of Kingsland in the championship with it drawing to a conclusion. As a result, the league required the two teams to play each other in the following round which was on 6 August to determine the title winner. The match was drawn 9-9, however as Kingsland was ahead in the standings they were awarded the Myers Cup as champions.

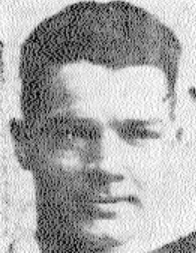
Claude List

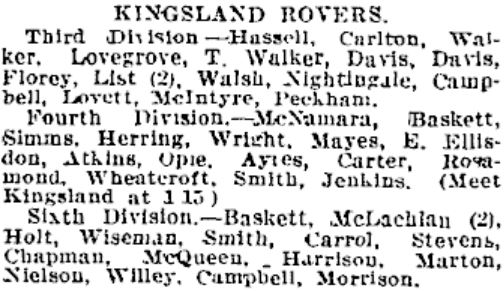
June 11 listed teams.

In mid-June their 3rd, 4th, and 6th grade team lists were published in the Auckland Star and were as follows, 3rd grade: G Hassell, H Carlton, T Walker, A Lovegrove, T. Walker, F Davis, F Florry, C List, J List, Walsh, A Nightingale, C Campbell, G Lovett, G McIntyre, Peckham, J Davison, 4th grade: McNamara, Baskett, Simms, Herring, Wright, Mayes, E. Ellisdon, Atkins, Opie, Ayres, Carter, Rosamond, D Wheatcroft, Smith, Jenkins, and 6th grade: Baskett, McLachlan (2), Holt, Wiseman, Smith, Carrol, Stevens, Chapman, McQueen, Harrison, Marton, Nielson, Willey, Campbell, and Morrison. One of the players named “List” in the 3rd grade side was future New Zealand rugby league international Claude List who began playing for the club the same year. The other List was possibly his older brother Percy though they were listed as “J List” on another occasion. The 4th, 5th, and 6th grade sides did not have many scores reported though from those that were it appears that each team finished around mid table in their respective grades. On 24 September Auckland Rugby League arranged for a series of matches to be played in Thames, travelling there by boat. The Kingsland 3rd and 4th grade sides were to play matches there against Parnell and Ponsonby respectively. The games were played at Dodd's Paddock in Parawai. Ultimately the fixtures were rearranged and only the Kingsland 3rd grade side travelled and played, losing to Ponsonby 15–8. As in 1920 the club held fortnightly Euchre and Dance evenings however they were now in the Masonic Hall on Eden Terrace. Their honorary secretary later in the season was Walker.

=== 1922 (3rd, 4th, & 6th grades) ===
In 1922 the Kingsland Rovers fielded sides in the 3rd, 4th, and 6th A grades. The 3rd grade team finished runner up to Ponsonby United, losing what was labelled the 'final' on 23 September by 9 points to 3. Their 4th grade side only had 5 results reported but won 4 of them and likely finished mid table. The 6th A grade side had 6 reported for 1 win, 1 draw, and 4 losses. For the opening round their published teams were: (3rd grade) – Nightingale, C. List, Johann List, Lovett, Rhodes, Frankie Herring, Mayes, Calton, Rann, Stanaway, Carter, Walker (2), Simms, Campbell, Kimberley, (4th grade) – Smith, McLachlan (2), Braithwaite Smith, Quickfall, Ellisdon, Atkins, O’Neil, Paterson, Roseman, McGeachen, Lay, Scott, Elliot, (6th grade A) – Baskett, Richards, Jones, Draper, Smith, Eide, Scott, McLachlan (2), Dixon, Harrison, Crew, Campbell, and Tierney.

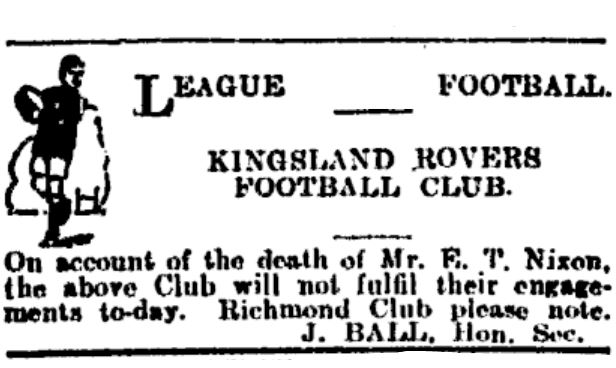
Newspaper notice for the postponement of Kingsland games due to the death of Edgar Nixon.

On 13 May a notice was published in the New Zealand Herald that Kingsland would be unable to fulfil their fixtures owing to the death of Edgar Thomas Nixon. The notice was published by their honorary secretary J. Ball. Nixon had attended Auckland Grammar School and was a well known sportsman from a young age. He represented the school's 1st XI cricket team and 1st XV rugby side before playing senior cricket and rugby for Grafton. He died from typhoid due to the epidemic, and his funeral was on a Saturday and attended by large numbers of sporting organisations and athletes including members of the Kingsland league sides who likely knew him well as he lived in Kingsland.

=== 1923, 2nd grade side ===
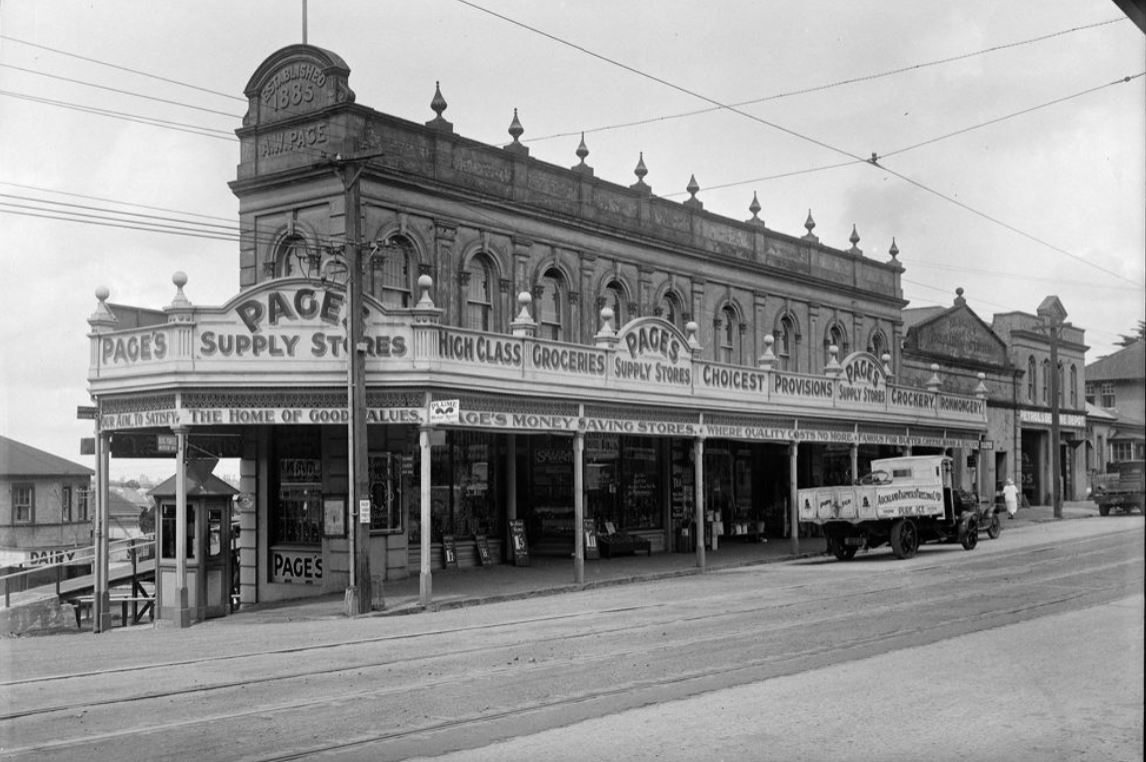
Pages Supply Store in Kingsland where the team met to walk to their Kingsland ground in the early 1920s.

In 1923 Kingsland fielded a 2nd grade side for the first time. The club held a practice at their Kingsland ground on 14 April, with members “requested to meet at Page’s Store” at 2 pm. They finished in the top half of the competition with at least 7 wins from their 13 matches. With 2 rounds left they were reported to be tied for 3rd in the 12 team competition. At the end of the season, on 6 October the 2nd grade side travelled to Huntly to play the local Huntly club side. Kingsland won 20 points to 3 with tries scored by Simms (2), and Gubb (2), with Gubb also kicking 4 goals. Their full side published in early May was: McLachlan, Claude List, Kindley, Smith, Mayes, Herring, McLean, Simms, McGregor, Stannaway, Davidson, Gubb, Howie, and F. Davis. The 3rd and 4th grade sides were not as successful and only had a small number of scores reported.

=== 1924 2nd and 3rd grades ===
In 1924 Kingsland Rovers had 2nd and 3rd grade teams. On Saturday 5 April they held a practice at their “Kingsland Training Ground” at the bottom of School Road in present-day Morningside, the suburb immediately to the west of Kingsland. The ground would have been located approximately where the north-western motorway passes through at the bottom of School Road. Their honorary secretary was J. Ball once more. On 2 August the 2nd grade side played curtain-raiser to the New Zealand – England test match at Carlaw Park. Kingsland lost the match 11–0 to Devonport United. Claude List played in the game for Kingsland and exactly 4 years and 2 days later he would debut for New Zealand against England on their next tour of New Zealand on the same ground.

On 30 August the Auckland Junior side played the Hamilton representative team at Carlaw Park. There were five Kingsland players named in the 16 man squad, they were Claude List, H. Clark, E. McManus, H. McGregor, and I Simms. Auckland won 14–8. The same teams played again this time in Hamilton at Steele Park on 4 October. This time just List, Clark, and McGregor were selected. Clark and List both scored tries in a 17–8 win. On October 18 Kingsland's 2nd grade side beat Otahuhu Rovers 6 to 3 to win the knockout competition. Otahuhu had earlier won the championship. They played the final junior match of the season against the Huntly club side on October 25 on the Outer Domain. The same night they held their annual concert at the Druid's Hall, North Street, Newton. Both the 2nd and 3rd grade teams were requested to meet at the Crown Studio on Saturday, November 8 for photographs. While the 2nd grade side won the knockout competition there few 3rd grade results reported so it is unknown where they finished in the standings, though they did not win the championship or the knockout competition.

=== 1925 B Division promotion ===
In 1925 the Auckland Rugby League decided to introduce a B Division grade. Kingsland held their annual meeting on Thursday 5 March in the Billiard Room, Kingsland, with players interested in playing for a “senior team” invited to attend. Kingsland entered a side in the grade along with 2nd, 3rd, and 4th grade teams.

The B Division team played along with Ellerslie United, Otahuhu Rovers, Māngere United, and Northcote & Birkenhead Ramblers. Kingsland played 10 matches, winning 4, drawing 2, and losing 4 to finish 3rd of the 5. In their debut match on 18 April against Northcote, Kingsland won 21–3 with Claude List scoring 3 tries on Carlaw Park #2. McManus also scored a try, as did Weatherly, with McManus kicking 2 conversions and Davison 1. List repeated his hat trick feat 2 weeks later in a 13–13 draw with Māngere at Peter Moko Farm in Māngere. The first ever Kingsland senior side for the Northcote match was: Claude List, J. Carter, Sheldon Kindley, Weatherly, B. Pitman, E. McManus, E. Simms, J. List, J. Davison, R. Graham, L. Lindsay, J. Flower, L. Simms, R. Whitton, G. McDowell, B. McIntyre, and C. Pardington.

Their 2nd grade side had none of their results reported and then withdrew from the competition after 4 rounds. Their 3rd grade team had 2 draws reported and a loss to Parnell, while the 4th grade team only had 4 losses reported. On 21 May the Auckland Star made mention of the Kingsland team colours, which had not been stated previously. It was in a short article on a “junior Parnell Rugby club”. The Carlaw Park gatekeepers said that the “young fellows, whose club colours are red, the same as the Kingsland League team, had been gaining admission to Carlaw Park by giving the password “Kingsland” to the gate keepers”.

On 27 June Claude List was selected to play in an Auckland trial at Carlaw Park. He was chosen on the wing for the Auckland “B Team”, which won 5–0. Following the match he was picked in the reserves of the Auckland team to play the New Zealand team on 2 July, though he was ultimately not required to play. He was also selected as a reserve in Auckland's match against South Auckland (Waikato) on 19 August, and then again as a reserve for their match with the touring Queensland side on 9 September, though he was once more not required in either game.

In August their senior side travelled to Huntly to play against the Huntly club side once more. They lost 19 to 5 to a strong opponent with McHowell scoring a try and kicking a penalty. Their junior teams also played with Huntly winning 8 to 3.

=== 1926 (First Senior Trophy) ===
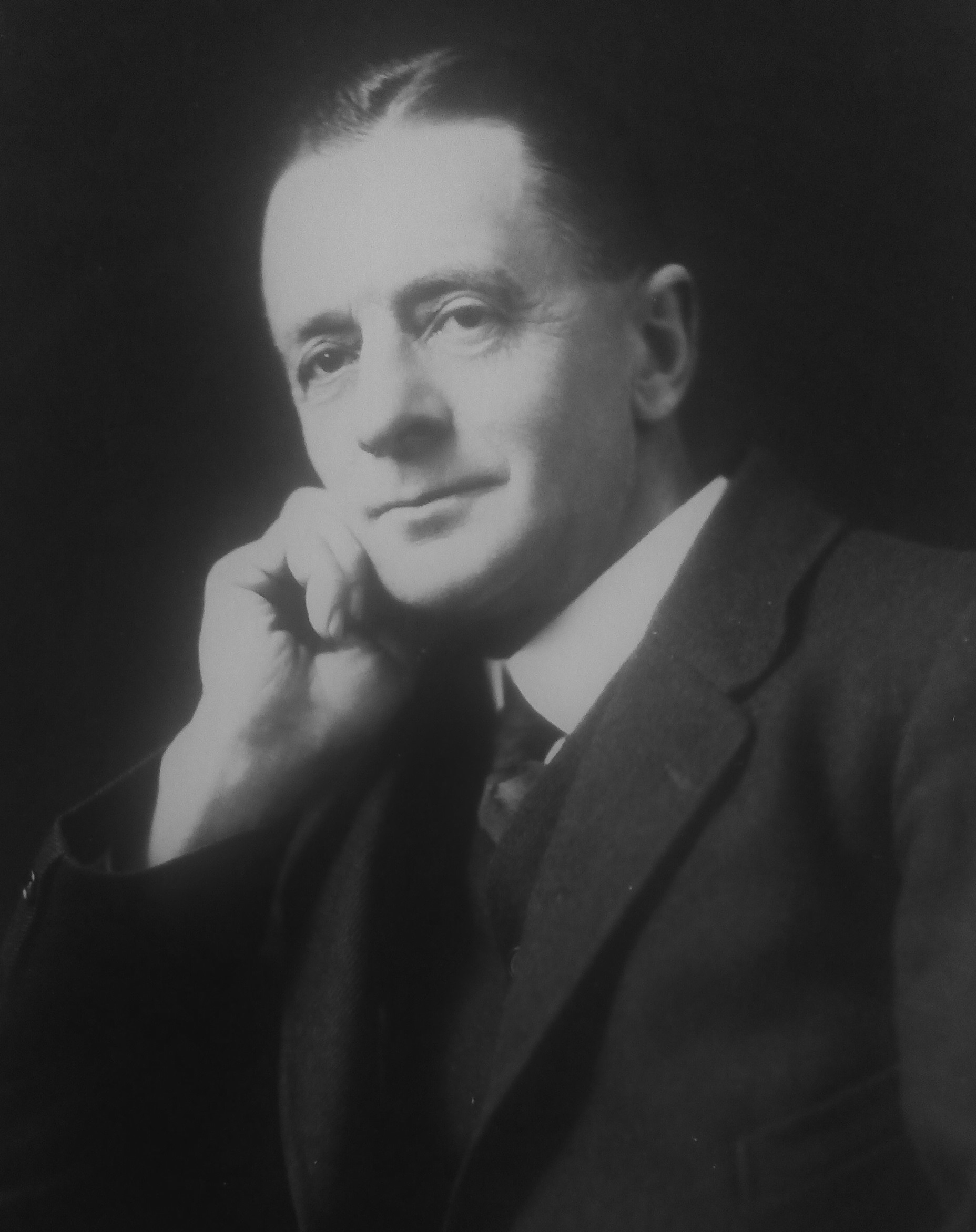
Fred Bartram M.P. for Grey Lynn. He was Kingsland's patron in 1926.

The 1926 season saw Kingsland once again field 3 teams with the senior side in the B Division. On 20 March details of their annual meeting were reported in the newspapers for the first time with the Auckland Star publishing the elected official names. It said that there were 90 members and supporters present with the club in a “very sound” financial position. The elected officers were:- “Patron Fred Bartram M.P; president, Mr. E. Barnaby; vice presidents, same as last year; hon. secretary, Mr. J Ball; auditors, Messrs Frederick Florey and E. Butler; delegate to A.R.L., Mr. A Bell; delegate to J.M.C., Mr. F. Florey; club captain, Mr. F. Scott; assistant captain, Mr. G. Dunn; committee, Messrs. Davidson (2), Bell, Carter, Butler, Scott, Campbell, Carroll, Craike, List, and McNeil”. Their patron, Fred Bartram was an MP from 1919 to 1928.

The Kingsland senior side finished runner up in the B Division behind Northcote, with a 9 win, 5 loss record from 14 matches, leaving them 3 points behind Northcote. They lost to Northcote 18–7 on 7 September in the penultimate round with a win required to overtake the eventual winners. Once again Claude List was selected for representative matches. He played in the New Zealand trial on 10 July for the B Team which won 30–28 with List scoring a try. He also played for Auckland against New Zealand on 31 July, scoring a try in their 52–32 win. New Zealand was departing for their ill-fated tour or England.

At the conclusion of the season a B Division representative side was selected to play against an Auckland Colts team. Bob Carter (wing) and Flower (loose forward) were chosen from the Kingsland side. Kingsland was also represented in the Auckland Junior representative side when their 21-man squad was chosen for a match at Rotorua in September. The players were F. Murgatroyd, and Ramm. Ultimately only Ramm was selected in the team to travel, where he played in the second row.

On 16 October Kingsland played Parnell in the Stallard Cup, knockout final competition at Carlaw Park. Kingsland won 25 to 13 to claim their first senior grade trophy. The New Zealand Herald wrote that their win “was due to the superior combination of the backs, who have shown consistent good form throughout the season”. For Kingsland Herring kicked a penalty in the first half, then in the second Carter scored three tries, with Flower and Campbell scoring one each, and Herring converting several of them. The Kingsland club finished the season with two games against the Huntly club which was visiting Auckland. Kingsland seniors won 24 to 13 and their junior side also won, by 26 points to 8.

=== 1927 (4 Teams) ===
In 1927 Kingsland increased their playing numbers and fielded 4 sides. Their senior team in the B Division finished runner up once more, though this time they were behind Ellerslie United. Kingsland had 10 wins and 2 losses with 2 other results unreported. Early in the season, on 9 April, it was reported that the club was holding a meeting at the Buffalo Lodge rooms on St Benedict Street to discuss their proposed trip to Huntly. On 24 May Kingsland travelled to Otahuhu to play the local side at the Otahuhu Trotting Ground and won 11–3. The Auckland Star wrote “Carter played a great game for the victors. Many of Kingsland’s supporters expect him to turn out a better player than List. Carter is only 17 years of age. Among the forwards, E. Simms was an outstanding player on the field, and when it is considered that he is over 40 years of age, there was plenty of merit in his performance in scoring two tries”. At the end of the season their senior side made the Stallard Cup knockout final once more but this time were defeated on 10 September by Ellerslie 15 points to 10. McManus and Simms scored for Kingsland with Herring converting both. They had led 10–9 at halftime before Ellerslie won with two second half tries. It was said in another match report that the side was wearing maroon uniforms. Two months later Bob Carter fractured his ankle in a 23–7 win against Parnell at Victoria Park on 2 July and was hospitalised. Their second grade team finished mid table while their 3rd grade intermediate side finished in the bottom half. And their 6th grade B side finished towards the bottom of the table.

Claude List was once again selected for Auckland and played 5 matches for them, scoring 7 tries. On 1 September Robert (Bob) Carter was selected to play for the Auckland Junior Representatives at Rotorua.

=== 1928 3 teams ===
The 1928 season was notable for Kingsland. Claude List being selected for the New Zealand national team. List was selected by Edward Fox, W.J. Mitchell, and W Murray to debut in the first test against England on 4 August at Carlaw Park. He thus became the first ever player to gain selection for New Zealand whilst playing for a second division club. He was named in the centres with Roy Hardgrave and Len Scott on the wings, Craddock Dufty at fullback, and Maurice Wetherill and Stan Prentice in the five eighth positions, and Frank Delgrosso at halfback. An all Auckland backline.

The club held their annual meeting in Hirst's Hall, Morningside on 28 March. Their representative to the Auckland Rugby League management committee was Mr. M. Huxford.

Kingsland finished with a 6 win, 6 loss record in the B Division to finish 3rd however they began to struggle for playing numbers late in the championship. In a loss to Otahuhu on 25 August they only had 8 players and the following week they defaulted to Parnell. In the first round of matches the referee (Mr. Hill) in the Otahuhu v Kingsland game stopped play early and awarded the game to Kingsland due to the rough play of the Otahuhu side. There were several fights during the match and the referee had difficulty keeping spectators off the field. According to the writer in the NZ Herald this “was not the first time the spectators at Otahuhu had made trouble, and they were really the cause of the players getting out of hand”. They were defeated by Grafton Athletic 18–10 in the semi final on 22 September.

== Amalgamation with Grafton Athletic ==
=== 1929 Combined debut season in 1st grade ===
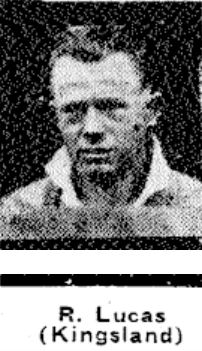
Kingsland's halfback in 1929.

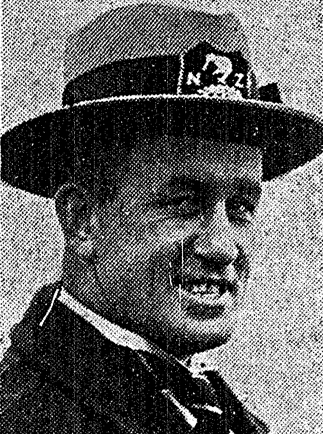
Bert Avery, their first coach.

In early April the Kingsland Rovers held a combined meeting with the Grafton Athletic (Originally Maritime) club. The two organisations decided to amalgamate. Grafton Athletic had spent many years in the first grade but had been relegated three years earlier and struggled to gain promotion. Rather than remain in the B Division again they decided to join forces with Kingsland and apply to enter a team in the Monteith Shield competition. A combined meeting was held in early April with 80 members in attendance with the new club name to be Kingsland Athletic Football Club. They decided to change their club colours to be a maroon jersey with a blue and gold shield and a “K.A.” monogram. Their first committee as a combined club “was: Patron, Mr. W.J. Webb; vice-patrons, Messrs. Bartram E. Barnaby and Pratt; president, Mr. J. McQuillan; vice presidents same as last year with power to add; hon. Secretary, Mr. John Reginald Angelo, Messrs. Bert Avery and T. Ratcliffe, delegate to Auckland Rugby League, Mr. H. Catterall; delegate to junior management committee, Mr. W. Dryland; club captain, Mr. John McGregor; committee, Messrs. Frederick Florey (chairman). H. Neil, A. Brown, L. Lucas, A. Huxford, J. Carter, Scott, Newman, and Opie”. Their admission into the first grade competition was granted at a 17 April meeting of the Auckland Rugby League.

They were coached by Bert Avery. Avery was later inducted into the 'New Zealand Legend's of League' after a career where he played 53 matches for New Zealand, captaining them on many occasions as well as 21 for Auckland. He had originally played for City Rovers (1915–16) before joining Maritime in 1919 where he played 95 games until retiring in 1927. He remained in the club which had amalgamated with Kingsland. The combined Kingsland Athletic senior side finished the 1929 season with a 5 win, 1 draw, 8 loss record to finish 6th out of 8 teams. Their second grade team finished last of 7, their third grade open team came 4th of 8, while the fifth grade side came 3rd of 10.

=== 1930 repetition of standings and final season ===
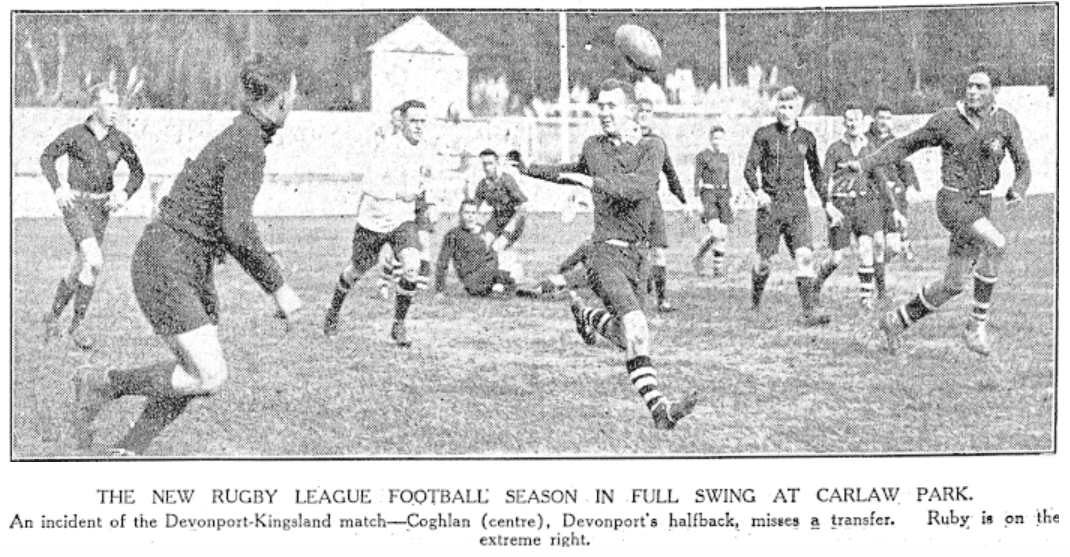
Kingsland v Devonport on 5 May 1930 at Carlaw Park. Marist won 16-13 but the result was over turned due to an unregistered Marist player.

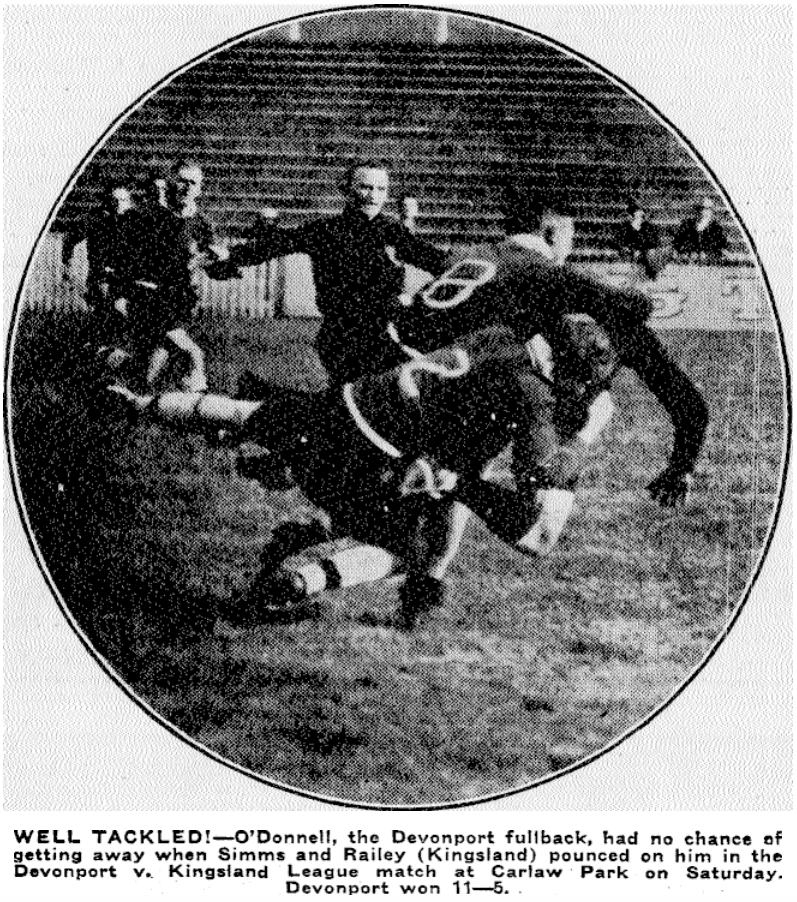
Devonport v Kingsland, 1930 at Carlaw Park

In 1930 they fared similarly winning 4, drawing 1 and losing 8 and once again finished 6th of 8. In July, Forbes and Martin were selected in the Auckland Junior side.

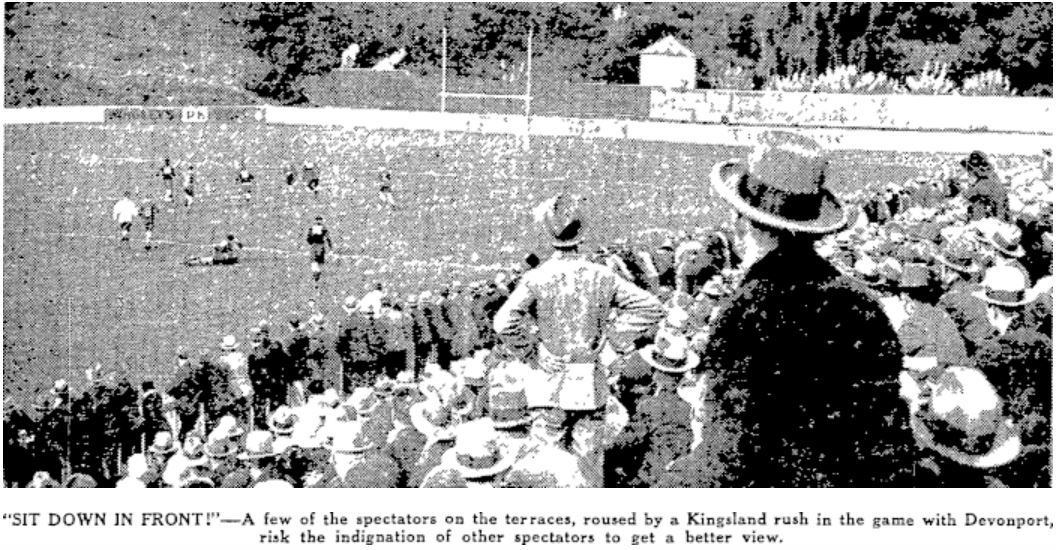
Kingsland and Devonport supporters on the Carlaw Park terraces for their 3 May 1930 match. Devonport won 11-5.

In their final season they again performed creditably in the first grade finishing 6th out of 8 once more with a 4 win, 1 draw, 8 loss record. Robert (Bob) Carter, and Claude List both made appearances for Auckland during the 1929 and 1930 seasons.

Their third grade team finished second with a 9 win, 3 draw, and 2 loss record behind Ponsonby. They won the 3rd grade intermediate competition winning 10 of their 12 games with 1 draw and 1 loss. They lost to Akarana/Parnell in the semi final of the knockout competition. The 4th grade competition was composed of 11 teams, with Kingsland ending up in 4th in a prolonged competition with 20 rounds played. They had all but 4 results reported and had a record of 7 wins, 3 draws, and 6 losses. Kingsland's 6th grade side struggled and only recorded 1 win from 15 reported scores.

=== Joining Marist Old Boys ===
The 1931 season saw Auckland Rugby League seeking to make the first grade competition more competitive. There had been a feeling that there were too many teams and the crowd number had dropped accordingly. The decision to drop from 8 teams to 6 had been made at the conclusion of the 1930 season. Kingsland Athletic had been removed from the A Grade and with a new reserve grade competition forming would have been forced into a Senior B grade which would have essentially been a 3rd division in terms of playing quality. As a result, they sought permission to join with the much stronger Marist Old Boys. They were “informed that the league would not opposed such a move”. And thus the Kingsland Athletic Football Club which had started out as Kingsland Rovers in 1920 and Maritime Football Club in 1918 was no more. Players, Robert (Bob) Carter, Francis (Frankie) Herring, Claude List and a handful of others moved to the Marist club while others were given free transfers to any other club.

== Season records ==
=== Highest graded team in each season ===
Season	Grade	Name	Pld	W	D	L	PF	PA	PD	Pts	Position (Teams)
1920	3rd Grade	Kingsland Rovers	10	0	0	2	7	27	-20	0	Third (Six), many results unknown
1921	4th Grade (Myers Cup)	Kingsland Rovers	11	2	1	1	35	31	+4	5	First (Seven), many results unknown
1922	3rd Grade (Myers cup)	Kingsland Rovers	12	8	0	4	51	61	-10	16	Second (Eleven)
1923	2nd Grade	Kingsland Rovers	13	7	0	5	71	44	+27	14	Fourth (Twelve)
1924	2nd Grade	Kingsland Rovers	11	2	0	3	52	34	+18	4	Sixth (Twelve), many results unknown
1925	B Division	Kingsland Rovers	10	4	2	4	93	76	+17	10	Third (Five)
1926	B Division	Kingsland Rovers	14	9	0	5	177	101	+76	18	Second (Six)
1927	B Division	Kingsland Rovers	12	10	0	2	137	60	+77	20	Second (Seven)
1928	B Division	Kingsland Rovers	12	6	0	6	130	105	+25	12	Third (Seven)
1929	1st Grade (Monteith Shield)	Kingsland Athletic	14	5	1	8	143	209	-66	11	Sixth (Eight)
1930	1st Grade (Monteith Shield)	Kingsland Athletic	13	4	1	8	113	156	-43	9	Sixth (Eight)
1920-30	Total		132	57	5	48	1009	904	+105	119	

== Head to Head records ==
Top point scorers
Opponent	Start	End	Games	Wins	Draws	Losses	For	Against
Northcote & Birkenhead Ramblers	1925	1926	7	4	0	1	85	64
Ellerslie United	1925	1926	6	1	0	5	34	38
Māngere United	1925	1926	5	4	1	0	66	46
Otahuhu Rovers	1925	1926	6	4	0	2	65	36
Parnell	1926	-	3	3	0	0	61	29
Huntly	1926	-	1	1	0	0	24	13
TOTAL	1925	1926	28	17	2	9	399	226

== Representative players ==
=== New Zealand players (with appearances whilst members of the Kingsland club) ===
- Claude List 1928 (1 game, 1 try), he made 3 further appearances for New Zealand in 1932 with the Marist club following the merger.

=== Auckland players (with appearances whilst members of the Kingsland club) ===
- Claude List 1928 (20)
- Robert (Bob) Carter 1929-30 (4)

Year	Name	Played	Tries	Con	Pen	Points
1925	Claude List	1	3	0	0	9
1926	Claude List	4	7	0	0	21
1927	Claude List	5	7	0	0	21
1928	Claude List	6	6	0	0	18
1929	Claude List	3	2	0	0	6
1929	Robert (Bob) Carter	2	2	0	0	6
1930	Robert (Bob) Carter	2	2	0	0	6
1930	Claude List	1	0	0	0	0

=== Auckland Province ===
- Claude List 1928 (1 game)

=== North Island ===
- Claude List 1927 (1 game, 1 try)

=== Other ===
==== New Zealand trials ====
- Claude List 1926 (1 game, 1 try), 1928 (1 game)

==== Auckland trials ====
- Claude List 1925 (1 game) & 1928 (1 game)

==== Auckland B ====
- Claude List 1925 (3 games, 2 tries)

==== Auckland B Division Representatives ====
- Robert (Bob) Carter (1926)
- Flower (1926)

==== Auckland Juniors ====
- Claude List (1924)
- H. Clark (1924)
- E. McManus (1924)
- H. McGregor (1924)
- I. Simms (1924)
- Ramm (1926)
- Forbes (1929)
- Martin (1929)
