= 1928 Auckland Rugby League season =

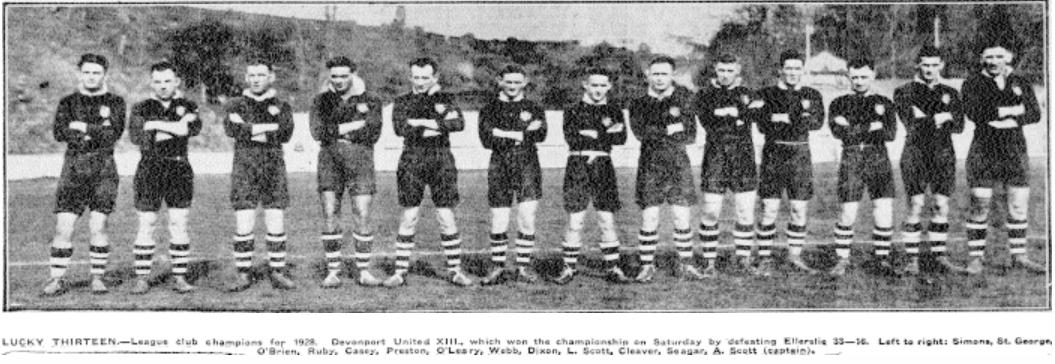
Devonport United, the 1928 first grade champions

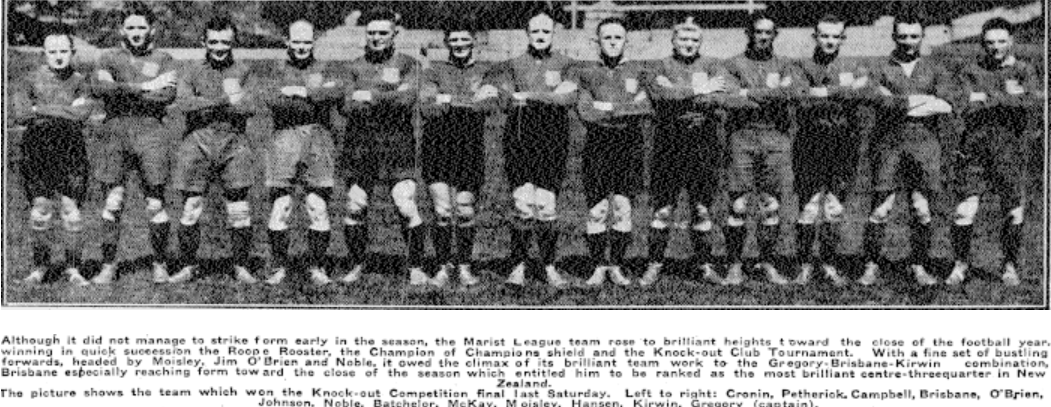
Marist Old Boys, Roope Rooster and Stormont Shield winning team

The 1928 Auckland Rugby League season was its 19th. Devonport United won the Senior A Championship for the first time under the Devonport United name, though they had won it twice before as North Shore Albions, before the North Shore merger with Sunnyside. Marist Old Boys won the Roope Rooster trophy for the first time. This was their second major trophy after winning the championship in 1924. They also went on to defeat Devonport to win the Stormont Shield.

Ellerslie United finished last in the first grade championship and as a result had to play a promotion relegation match with the winners of the B Division which was Grafton Athletic. This was the second consecutive year they had met in this match. Ellerslie won 15-13 to retain their place in the first grade. The Grafton club then decided to amalgamate with Kingsland Rovers who were also in the B Division to gain acceptance into the 1st grade competition for the 1929 season.

| Preceded by 1927 | 19th Auckland Rugby League season 1928 | Succeeded by 1929 |

== Season news and summary ==
=== Club teams by grade participation ===
| Team | 1st | B Div. | 2nd | 3rd Open | 3rd Int. | 4th | 5th | 6th A | 6th B | Schools | Total |
|---|---|---|---|---|---|---|---|---|---|---|---|
| Richmond Rovers | 1 | 0 | 1 | 1 | 1 | 1 | 1 | 1 | 1 | 1 | 9 |
| Devonport United | 1 | 0 | 1 | 2 | 1 | 1 | 1 | 1 | 1 | 0 | 9 |
| Ponsonby United | 1 | 0 | 1 | 1 | 1 | 1 | 0 | 0 | 0 | 0 | 5 |
| Point Chevalier | 0 | 1 | 0 | 0 | 1 | 1 | 0 | 1 | 1 | 0 | 5 |
| Otahuhu Rovers | 0 | 1 | 0 | 1 | 0 | 1 | 0 | 1 | 0 | 1 | 5 |
| Newton Rangers | 1 | 0 | 1 | 0 | 1 | 0 | 0 | 0 | 1 | 0 | 4 |
| City Rovers | 1 | 0 | 0 | 0 | 1 | 1 | 0 | 0 | 1 | 0 | 4 |
| Northcote & Birkenhead Ramblers | 0 | 1 | 0 | 1 | 0 | 1 | 0 | 1 | 0 | 0 | 4 |
| Akarana | 0 | 0 | 0 | 0 | 0 | 1 | 1 | 1 | 1 | 0 | 4 |
| Newmarket | 0 | 0 | 0 | 0 | 1 | 0 | 0 | 1 | 1 | 1 | 4 |
| Ellerslie United | 1 | 0 | 0 | 1 | 0 | 1 | 0 | 0 | 0 | 1 | 4 |
| Māngere United | 0 | 1 | 1 | 1 | 0 | 0 | 0 | 0 | 0 | 1 | 4 |
| Marist Old Boys | 1 | 0 | 0 | 0 | 0 | 0 | 0 | 1 | 1 | 0 | 3 |
| Grafton Athletic | 0 | 1 | 0 | 1 | 0 | 0 | 1 | 0 | 0 | 0 | 3 |
| Kingsland Rovers | 0 | 1 | 0 | 1 | 0 | 0 | 0 | 1 | 0 | 0 | 3 |
| Remuera | 0 | 0 | 1 | 0 | 1 | 1 | 0 | 0 | 0 | 0 | 3 |
| Parnell | 0 | 1 | 0 | 1 | 0 | 0 | 0 | 0 | 0 | 0 | 2 |
| New Lynn | 0 | 0 | 0 | 1 | 1 | 0 | 0 | 0 | 0 | 0 | 2 |
| Mount Albert United | 0 | 0 | 0 | 1 | 0 | 0 | 1 | 0 | 0 | 0 | 2 |
| Glen Eden Rovers | 0 | 0 | 0 | 1 | 0 | 0 | 0 | 0 | 0 | 0 | 1 |
| Browne Bros & Geddes | 0 | 0 | 0 | 0 | 0 | 0 | 1 | 0 | 0 | 0 | 1 |
| Onehunga Convent | 0 | 0 | 0 | 0 | 0 | 0 | 0 | 0 | 0 | 1 | 1 |
| Papatoetoe Primary School | 0 | 0 | 0 | 0 | 0 | 0 | 0 | 0 | 0 | 1 | 1 |
| Total | 7 | 7 | 6 | 14 | 9 | 10 | 6 | 9 | 8 | 7 | 83 |

=== Senior competition ===
The senior club season featured over 110 matches through various competitions and did not finish until late October when suburban cricket competitions had already begun.

Grafton Athletic won the Senior B Division competition going undefeated season after they had been relegated the previous season, though they were beaten in the promotion relegation match with Ellerslie meaning they would have to stay there for another season. Point Chevalier defeated Grafton Athletic in the Stallard Cup final which was the Senior B knockout competition. The season was notable for the number of teams which played sides from other areas. Ponsonby, Richmond, Parnell, and the Northcote and Birkenhead Ramblers all played sides from North Auckland and the Waikato. During the year Carlaw Park saw its 300th senior grade match played on it stretching back to its opening in 1921 while the senior competitions also saw its 1,000th game played (includes all official 1st grade matches and matches involving senior teams in the B Division - Norton Cup).

=== Mt Albert Club formed ===
Mt Albert held their first meeting at St George's Hall in Mt Albert on the evening of 3 April. Ralph Wilson chaired the meeting and George Rhodes, chairman of the Auckland Rugby League was present. It was decided that they would form a club in the Mt Albert area though they did not decide on a name at this time. They would enter teams in the third and fourth grades. During the season Auckland Rugby League made a grant of £3 to Mount Albert for a dressing shed.

=== Newmarket Club formed ===
In April it was reported that Newmarket was entering a team in the 6th grade competition. They club was to wear yellow and black. There was a fear that the club would rob the Parnell club of players but the league accepted the nomination anyway. The also then entered sides in the third grade intermediate grade as well as another team in the sixth grade in the B section. They also had a Primary School side which won the schoolboy championship.

=== Representative program ===
It was a very busy season, with ten representative fixtures including matches against the touring England team. Ernie Asher, Edwin Vincent Fox, and Bert Avery were appointed selectors for the representative team for the season.

=== Annual general meeting ===
At the annual general meeting of Auckland Rugby League it was noted that out of the 28 playing days during the 1927 season thirteen of them were played in wet weather; however, crowds were still good and they were happy with the growth of the game. Further developments at Carlaw Park were planned, consisting of "conveniences for ladies...extra accommodation... for players, and three more dressing rooms" at a cost of £60. There was a lengthy discussion about Ellerslie's application to join the A Grade. They had won the B Grade competition and defeated the last placed Grafton from A Grade. The annual general meeting was held at the Auckland Chamber of Commerce on Swanson Street.

=== Thistle Cup ===
The Management Committee announced at the midway mark of the senior club season that the Thistle Cup would be awarded to the A or B grade team that had scored the most points in the second round of competition. If two teams were tied then the trophy would be awarded to the team which had scored the most points for the whole season.

=== Ground availability ===
An ongoing issue for many clubs in Auckland was the availability of playing fields as the number of teams grew. During the season Northcote opened a new field at Stafford Park which is still in existence adjacent to State Highway 1 just north of the Auckland Harbour Bridge. Devonport also had a deputation present at the Devonport Borough Council meeting on 10 May to ask about the shortage of grounds in the area. The club asked for permission to use some of the spare cricket grounds for matches. Mayor E. Aldridge said there would be a ground available at Stanley Bay.

=== Rule changes ===
After Round 5 the issue of time keeping in matches at Carlaw Park was raised at the weekly Management Committee meeting. The bell had been rung in the match between Richmond and Devonport at Carlaw Park before the ball was dead which was against previously arranged rules. Agreement could not be reached on whether the timekeeper or referee should be responsible for calling time. In the end it was decided that official timekeepers should attend the Referees' Association meeting for instructions.

It was noted that the dead ball area on both fields at Carlaw Park had been reduced from 12 yards to 8 yards in accordance with the laws of rugby league.

A rule change came into effect during the season after the annual meeting of the English Rugby League. They decided that no forward at any time in the scrum could have both feet off the ground. Also forwards could not drop to one knee to attempt to hook the ball. The game in New Zealand would adhere to these rules.

== Richard Stack benefit matches ==
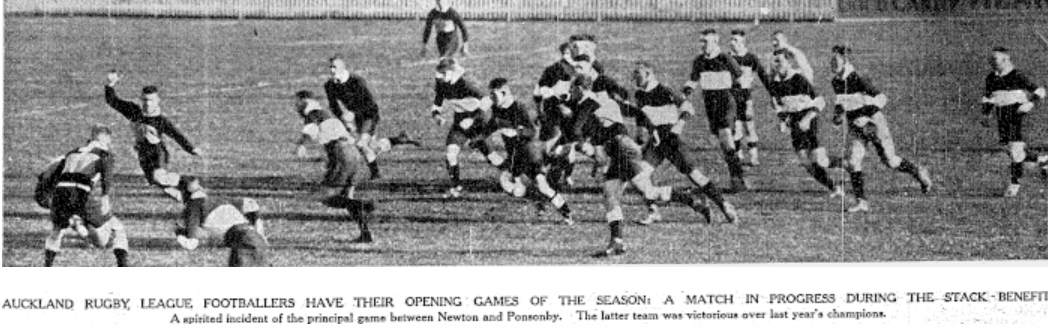

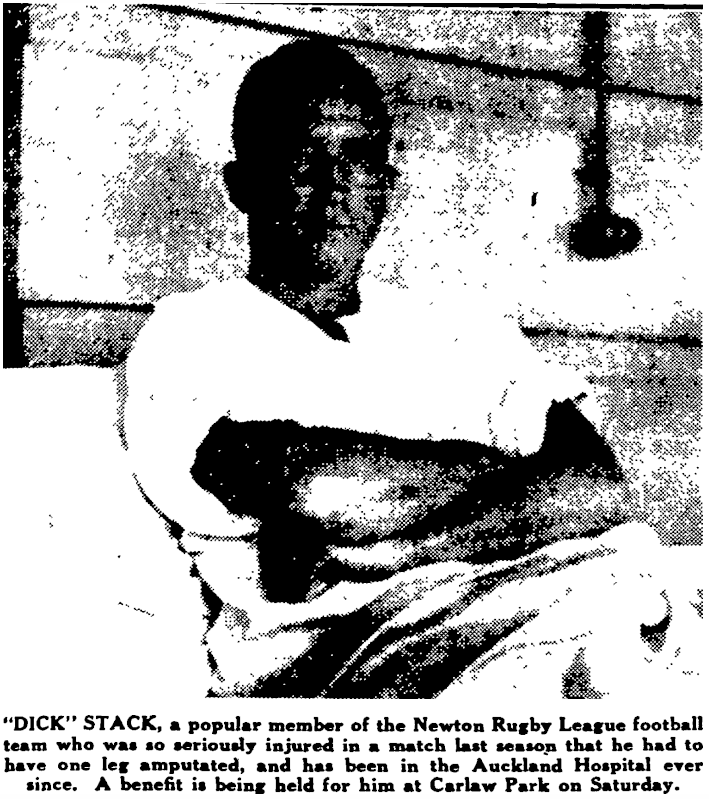
Richard (Dick) Stack in hospital after having his leg amputated following an injury at Carlaw Park in 1927.

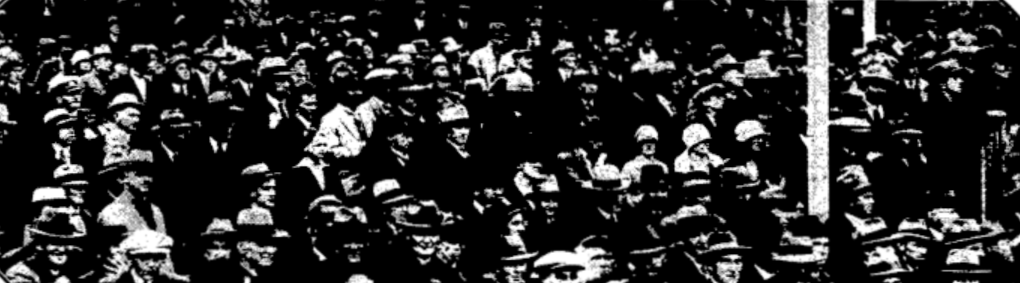
The crowd at the Dick Stack benefit matches.

The opening weekend of the season saw four first grade matches played at Carlaw Park, though these matches were not part of the competition. The round was dedicated to Richard Stack (commonly known as Dick Stack) of the Newton Rangers who had suffered a broken leg in the Stormont Shield final the previous season and the injury was so bad Auckland Hospital staff were forced to amputate it. This meant that he was unable to continue in his profession and so the league fundraised so that he was able to start his own business. A total of £500 was taken at the gates with 10,000 spectators in attendance. The day also featured a program of boxing matches with the prizes donated back to Stack. After all the accounts were balanced it was worked out that the fund for Stack totalled £610 12/3. An oddity of the games themselves was the low scoring nature and that all four losing teams failed to register a single point. Given the timing in the season and the fact they were for charity and competition points they were largely treated as practice matches with the City Rovers side using 18 players. Jack O'Sullivan made his debut for Marist. He was a champion bantam weight boxer and his son went on to become the well known horse racing trainer Dave O'Sullivan and his grandson is Lance O'Sullivan, one of New Zealand's greatest ever jockey's.

| 21 April | Ponsonby | 13–0 | Newton | Carlaw Park 1 |
| 3:30 | Try: Lou Hutt, George Gardiner, Victor Fagan; Con: George Gardiner, W Langley | | | Attendance: 10,000; Referee: Les Bull |

| 21 April | Marist | 3–0 | Devonport | Carlaw Park 1 |
| 2:00 | Try: Kirkland | | | Attendance: 10,000; Referee: William Mincham |

| 21 April | Richmond | 10–0 | City | Carlaw Park 2 |
| 3:30 | Try: McCarthy, Jones; Con: L Taylor; Pen: L Taylor | | | Attendance: 10,000; Referee: H McKubrey |

| 21 April | Grafton | 4–0 | Ellerslie | Carlaw Park 2 |
| | Pen: Ralph Longville 2 | | | Attendance: 10,000; Referee: Percy Rogers |

== Monteith Shield (First Grade Championship) ==
=== Monteith Shield standings ===
| Team | Pld | W | D | L | F | A | Pts |
|---|---|---|---|---|---|---|---|
| Devonport United | 12 | 9 | 0 | 3 | 224 | 149 | 18 |
| Richmond Rovers | 12 | 7 | 1 | 4 | 143 | 132 | 15 |
| Newton Rangers | 12 | 7 | 0 | 5 | 143 | 138 | 14 |
| Ponsonby United | 12 | 5 | 2 | 5 | 154 | 144 | 12 |
| Marist Old Boys | 12 | 5 | 1 | 6 | 154 | 170 | 11 |
| City Rovers | 12 | 4 | 0 | 8 | 144 | 164 | 8 |
| Ellerslie United | 12 | 3 | 0 | 9 | 102 | 162 | 6 |

=== Monteith Shield fixtures ===
==== Round 1 ====
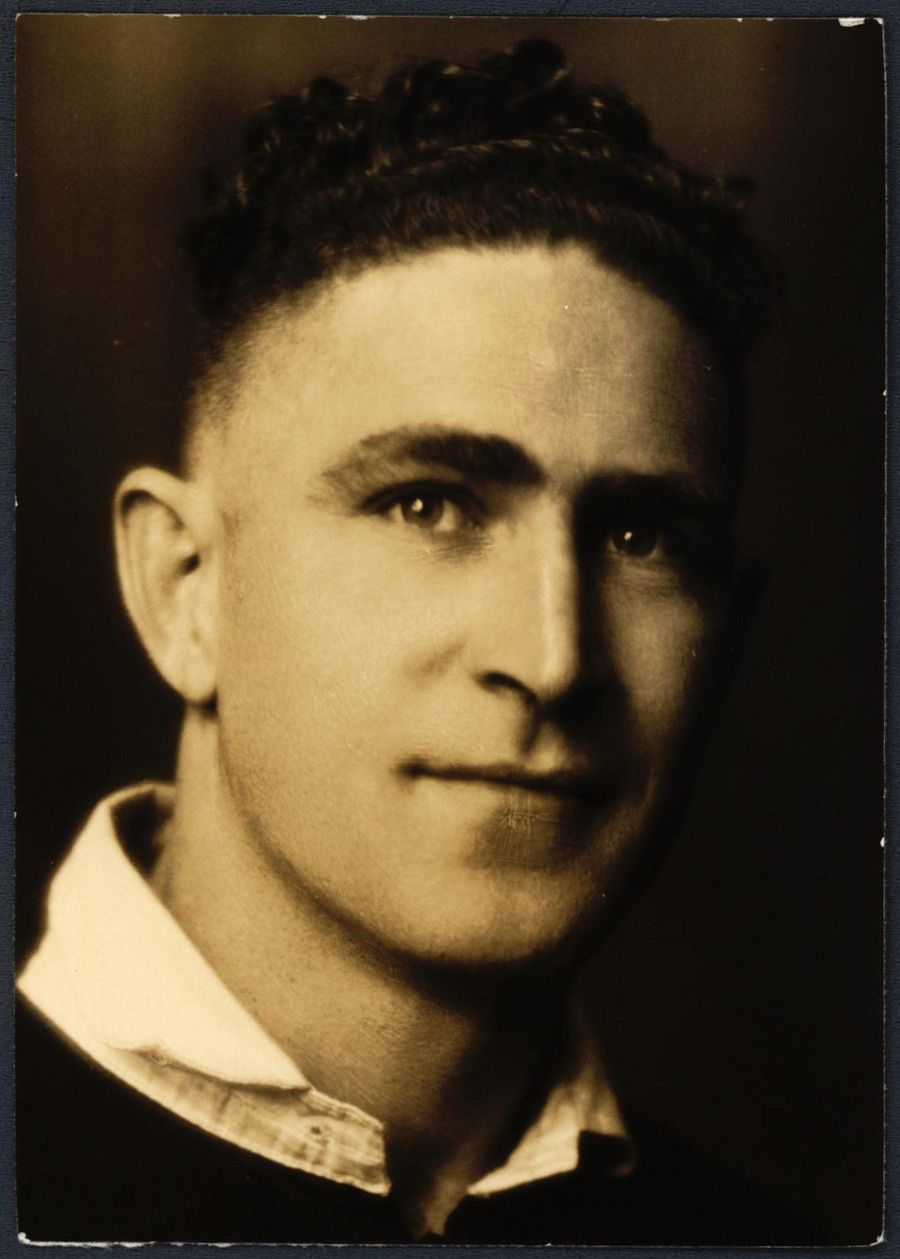
Bill Hadley, future All Black debuted for City and would go on to play for them for three seasons before switching to rugby union.

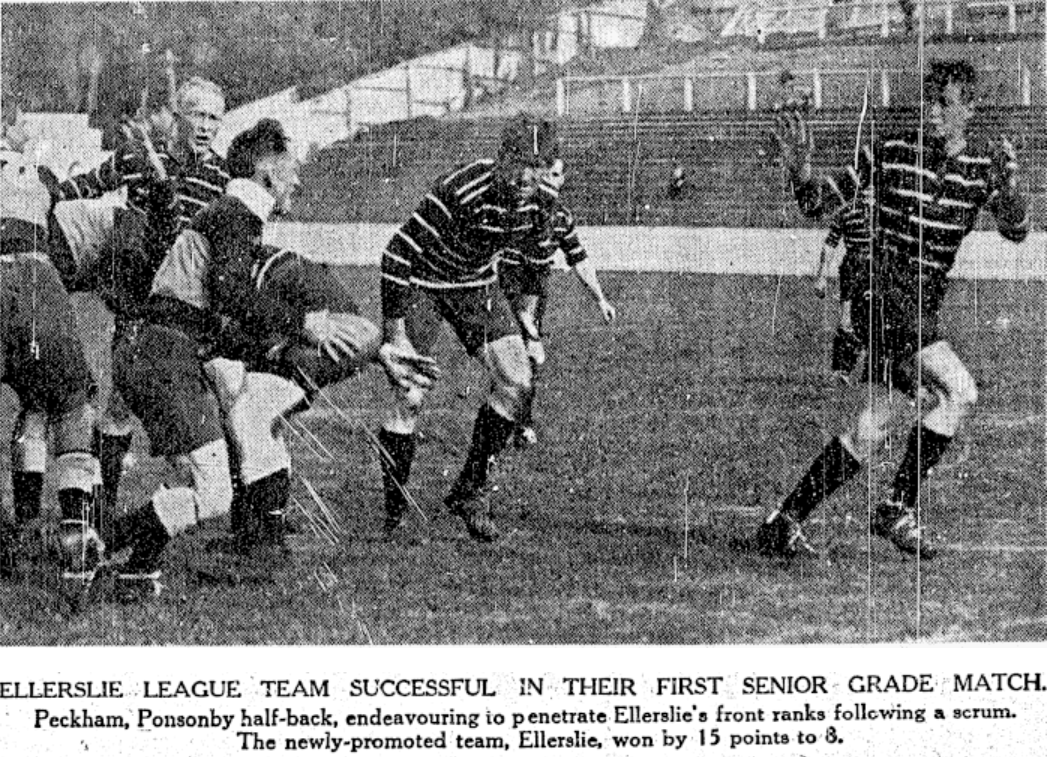

Round 1 saw the newly promoted Ellerslie upset Ponsonby 15 points to 8. This was Ellerslie's first ever match in the first grade. The season was ceremonially kicked off by Miss Peggy Rhodes, daughter of George Rhodes, the chairman of Auckland Rugby League Management Committee. Bill Hadley made his first grade debut for City alongside his brother Joe. Hadley switched to rugby union in 1931 and became an All Black in 1934 and played 25 games for them over three years. His older brother Swin Hadley was an All Black in 1928.

| 28 April | Richmond | 18–10 | Newton | Carlaw Park 1 |
| 3:15 | Try: McCarthy 2, Turton, Ralph Jenkinson; Con: L Taylor 3 | | Try: M Herewini, Alan Clarke; Con: Craddock Dufty; Pen: Craddock Dufty | Attendance: 5500; Referee: William Mincham |

| 28 April | Devonport | 24–6 | City | Carlaw Park 2 |
| 3:15 | Try: Len Scott 2, Stanley Rule, S Casey, Alf Scott, Alfred Saxon; Con: Allan Seagar 2 Pen: Allan Seagar | | Try: George Perry, Norman Pascoe | Attendance: 5500; Referee: Les Bull |

| 28 April | Ellerslie | 15–8 | Ponsonby | Carlaw Park 1 |
| 1:45 | Try: Davis, Allen, A Dance; Con: John Shand 3 | | Try: Tim Peckham, Bert Payne; Pen: Tim Peckham | Attendance: 5,500; Referee: Vic Simpson |

==== Round 2 ====
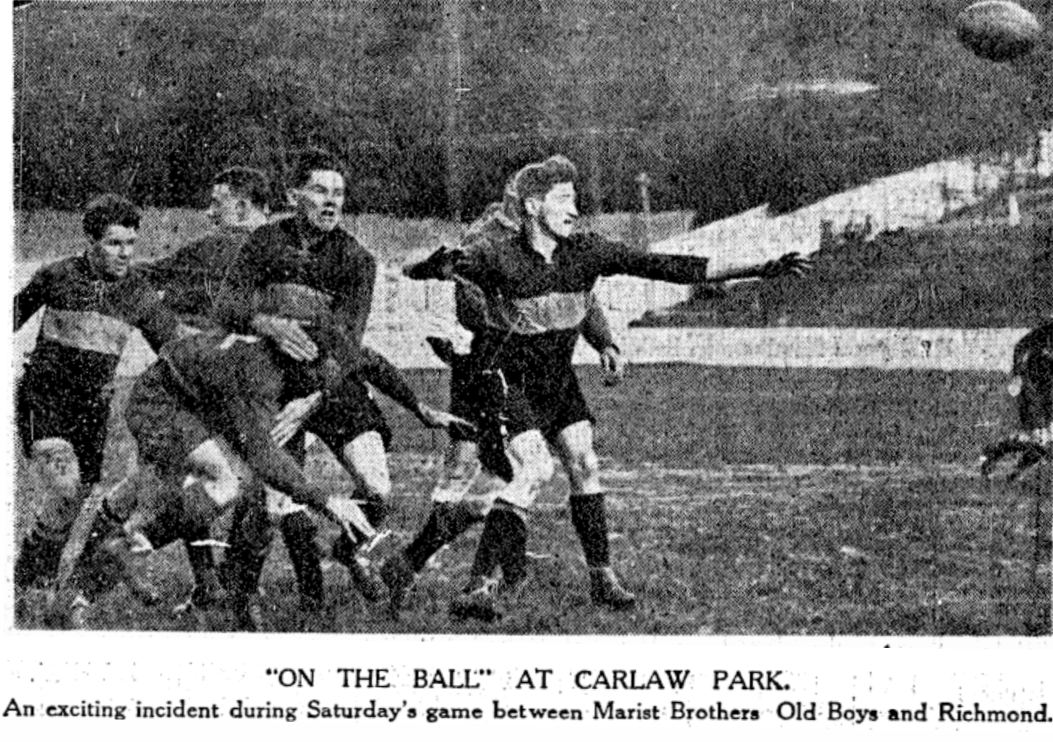

| 5 May | Richmond | 15–0 | Marist | Carlaw Park 1 |
| 3:15 | Try: Ralph Jenkinson 2, H Stewart; Con: L Taylor; Pen: L Taylor 2 | | | Attendance: 6000; Referee: Les Bull |

| 5 May | Devonport | 12–11 | Newton | Carlaw Park 1 |
| 1:45 | Try: Len Scott 2, Preston, Alfred Saxon | | Try: Hayden, Henry, Murray; Con: Craddock Dufty | Attendance: 6000; Referee: H McKubrey |

| 5 May | Ponsonby | 19–6 | City | Carlaw Park 2 |
| 3:00 | Try: Goodley, Tim Peckham, Victor Fagan, J Payne 2 Con: Tim Peckham 2 | | Try: J Iveson, Lawrence | Attendance: 6000; Referee: Percy Rogers |

==== Round 3 ====
Tim Peckham, the representative halfback for Ponsonby, was suspended for 4 weeks following comments he made towards the referee in their loss to Newton.

| 12 May | Devonport | 31–22 | Marist | Carlaw Park 1 |
| 3:00 | Try: Len Scott 4, Alfred Saxon, Horace Dixon 2 Con: Alf Scott 2, Ernest Ruby 2 Drop: Lindsay Simons | | Try: Bernard Sweeney, Dick Moisley, Jock Graham, Hec Brisbane; Con: Owen Cronin 4 Pen: Owen Cronin | Attendance: 6000; Referee: William Mincham |

| 12 May | Newton | 22–13 | Ponsonby | Carlaw Park 2 |
| 3:00 | Try: Trevor Hall, Robert Purdy, Murray, M Little; Con: Craddock Dufty 4 Pen: Craddock Dufty | | Try: Lou Hutt, Albert Payne, Victor Fagan; Con: Tim Peckham 2 | Attendance: 6000; Referee: Arthur Rae |

| 12 May | City | 26–3 | Ellerslie | Auckland Domain 1 |
| 3:00 | Try: George Perry, Lawrence 2, Fraser Webberley, Norman Pascoe, Bill Hamilton; Con: Horne 3 Pen: Horne | | Try: Ivan Littlewood | Referee: Les Bull |

==== Round 4 ====
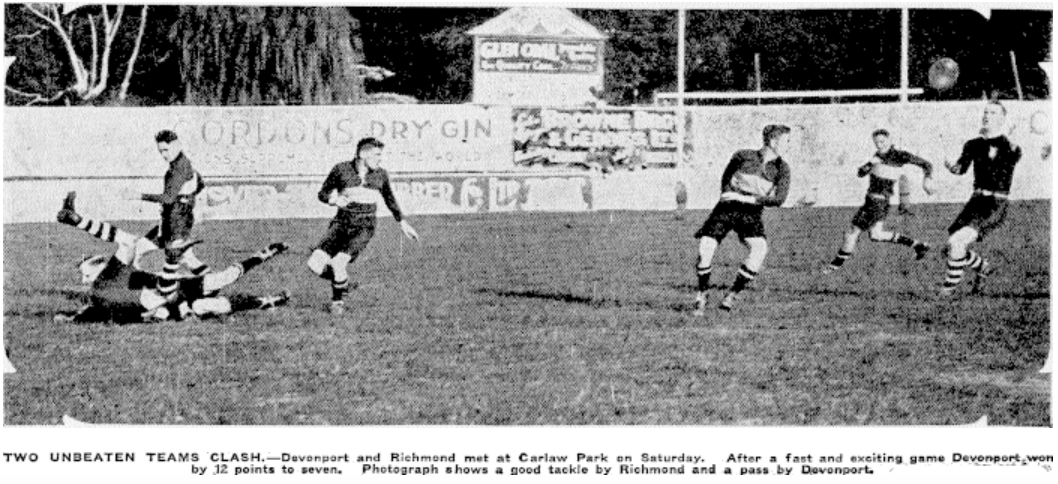

It was decided by Auckland Rugby League after the 3rd round that they would no longer play curtain-raiser matches by Senior A Grade teams at 1:30pm. This was due to players having difficulty getting to the ground on time as they often worked on Saturdays and had to travel from the outer suburbs. A recent example had been the Newton Rangers v Devonport match where several Newton players had arrived late and the match was so late kicking off that the second half lasted only 25 minutes instead of 40. Leslie Letton, a well known rugby player transferred from rugby union where he had been playing for Marist, and scored 2 tries for Ponsonby on debut in their 18–14 loss to Marist. He had only just left hospital days earlier after nursing a broken arm since the beginning of the season. He had played for Auckland B rugby team in 1927 and represented Waikato prior to that. Davis played break away for Ellerslie after having previously played representative league for Otago in the backs.

| 19 May | Devonport | 12–7 | Richmond | Carlaw Park 1 |
| 3:00 | Try: Alf Scott, Ernest Ruby; Con: Wells; Pen: Wells 2 | | Try: Colebrook; Pen: L Taylor 2 | Attendance: 9,000; Referee: Percy Rogers |

| 19 May | Marist | 18–14 | Ponsonby | Carlaw Park 2 |
| 3:00 | Try: Hec Brisbane, Jim Johnson 2, Wilf Hassan; Con: Charles Gregory 3 | | Try: Leslie Letton 2 Con: Frank Delgrosso; Pen: Frank Delgrosso 3 | Attendance: 9,000; Referee: Bert Emirali |

| 19 May | Ellerslie | 5–13 | Newton | Ellerslie Reserve |
| 3:00 | Try: Davis; Con: John Shand | | Try: M Little, Roy Hardgrave 2 Con: Craddock Dufty; Pen: Craddock Dufty | Referee: H McKubrey |

==== Round 5 ====
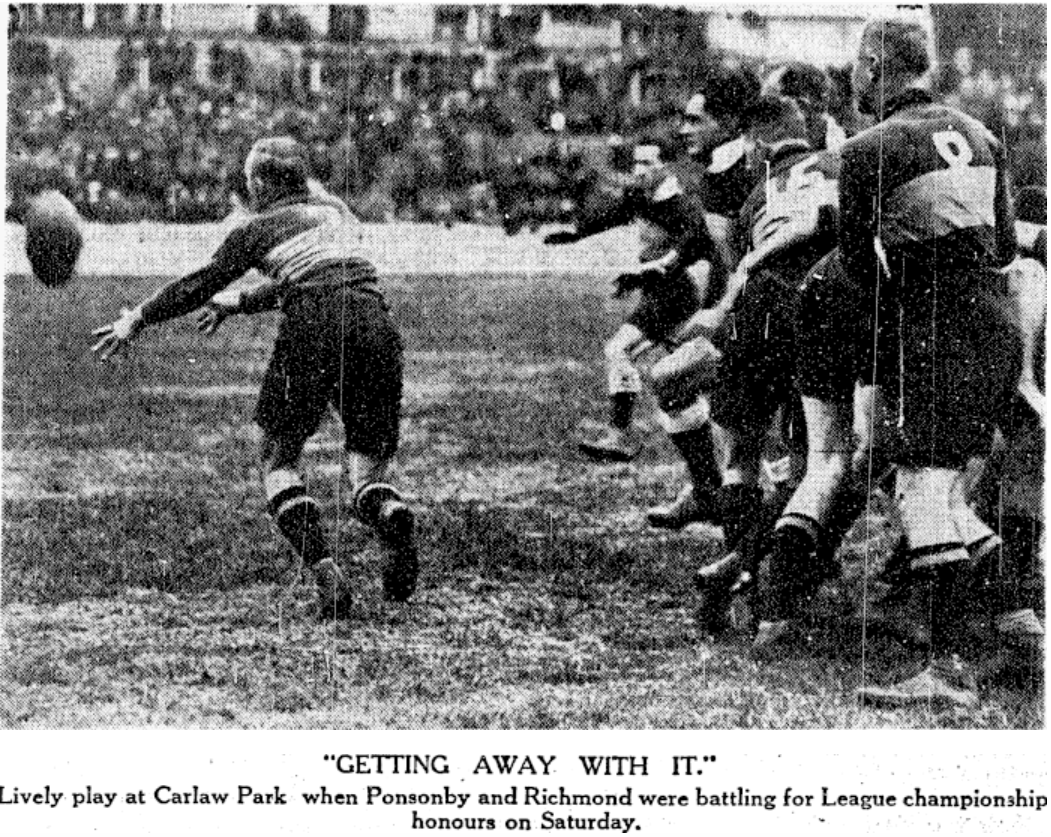
Bill Davis, the Richmond halfback clearing the ball with George Gardiner leaving the scrum for Ponsonby. Hector Cole can be seen in the background at first five for Ponsonby

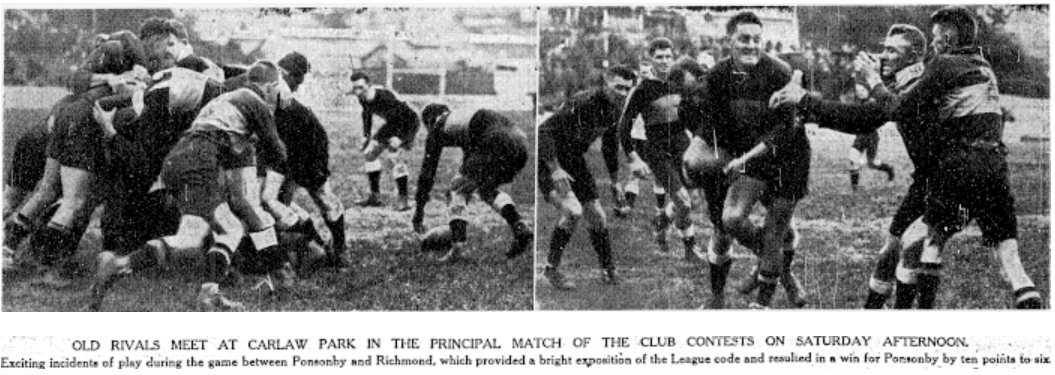
Dooley Moore at halfback about to pick up and pass to Hector Cole at first five.

In Marist's win over Ellerslie representative tennis player Leslie Knott made his first appearance of the year after debuting the previous season. Dick Moisley scored 4 tries on the other wing for Marist after spending the 1927 season in the forwards before playing the previous week at standoff and now being tried on the wing. For Ellerslie Robert (Bob) Crewther was playing his second game after having played for Marist the previous season. He had started the season playing for the Petone side in Wellington before moving back to Auckland. His brother Selby was in his second year for Ellerslie after previously having played with Robert at City Rovers. At the Auckland Domain City beat Newton (6-3) who were missing Craddock Dufty, Trevor Hall, M Herewini, and Murray who were all injured.

| 26 May | Ponsonby | 10–6 | Richmond | Carlaw Park 1 |
| 3:00 | Try: Dooley Moore, Frank Delgrosso; Con: Frank Delgrosso; Pen: Frank Delgrosso | | Pen: L Taylor 3 | Attendance: 4,000; Referee: Les Bull |

| 26 May | Marist | 26–8 | Ellerslie | Carlaw Park 2 |
| 3:00 | Try: Dick Moisley 4, Hec Brisbane, Jack Keenan; Con: Charles Gregory 4 | | Try: Robert Crewther, Cooke; Con: Selby Crewther | Attendance: 4,000; Referee: William Mincham |

| 26 May | City | 6–3 | Newton | Auckland Domain 1 |
| 3:00 | Try: Joe Hadley, Lawrence | | Try: Alan Clarke | Referee: H McKubrey |

==== Round 6 ====
The match between Richmond and Ellerslie was played at 9:30 in the morning on the Kings Birthday holiday as part of the celebrations.

| 2 June | Devonport | 21–19 | Ponsonby | Carlaw Park 1 |
| 3:00 | Try: Len Scott, Allan Seagar 2, J Beattie, Ernest Ruby, Alfred Saxon; Con: Alf Scott 2, Alfred Saxon | | Try: George Gardiner, Lou Hutt, Bert Payne; Con: Frank Delgrosso 3 Pen: Frank Delgrosso 2 | Attendance: 5,000; Referee: H McKubrey |

| 2 June | Marist | 39–12 | City | Carlaw Park 2 |
| 3:00 | Try: Owen Cronin, George Batchelor, Hec Brisbane, Dick Moisley, Bill Noble, Bernard Sweeney, Phil Brady 2, Jim Graham; Con: Charles Gregory 5, Owen Cronin | | Try: George Perry, Lawrence; Con: Laurie Barchard; Pen: Laurie Barchard; Drop: George Perry | Attendance: 5,000; Referee: Wilfred Simpson |

| 4 June | Richmond | 6–4 | Ellerslie | Carlaw Park 1 |
| 9:30 | Try: L Taylor 2 | | Pen: Bob Crewther 2 | Attendance: 1,500; Referee: A Saunders |

==== Round 7 ====
Following the conclusion of the first round, The New Zealand Herald published the individual points tallies of all the point scorers. This was the first time this had been done. Taylor of Richmond led the standings with 46 points, Len Scott of Devonport had 33, while Craddock Dufty of Newton was third with 26 points.

| 9 June | Newton | 21–3 | Marist | Carlaw Park 1 |
| 3:00 | Try: Murray, Trevor Hall, G Rhodes, Robert Purdy, Roy Hardgrave; Con: Craddock Dufty 3 | | Try: George Batchelor | Referee: William Mincham |

| 9 June | Richmond | 27–18 | City | Carlaw Park 2 |
| 3:00 | Try: L Taylor 2, Stan Prentice, Bill Davis, McCarthy; Con: L Taylor 4 Pen: L Taylor 2 | | Try: Maurice Wetherill 2, George Perry, McDonald; Con: Laurie Barchard; Pen: Laurie Barchard 2 | Referee: H Taylor |

| 9 June | Devonport | 16–3 | Ellerslie | Devonport Domain |
| 3:00 | Try: Stan Webb, Len Scott 2, Allan Seagar; Con: Alf Scott 2 | | Try: V Speight | Referee: Percy Rogers |

==== Round 8 ====
Jim O'Brien the Devonport forward came out of retirement to rejoin their forward pack. he had debuted in the senior grade for Maritime in 1920 before joining Devonport in 1921 and playing over 70 games for them. He represented New Zealand once in 1925 and had played for Auckland 20 times from 1922 to 1927.

| 23 June | Newton | 17–13 | Richmond | Carlaw Park 1 |
| 2:45 | Try: M Little, Roy Hardgrave, G Cammick; Con: Craddock Dufty; Pen: Craddock Dufty 3 | | Try: Trevor Hanlon; Con: L Taylor; Pen: L Taylor 4 | Attendance: 3,000; Referee: Arthur Rae |

| 23 June | Ponsonby | 22–5 | Ellerslie | Carlaw Park 2 |
| 2:45 | Try: Leslie Letton 2, Dooley Moore, Sydney Usher 2, Horne; Con: Tim Peckham, Frank Delgrosso | | Try: Hemingway; Con: J Shand | Attendance: 3,000; Referee: William Mincham |

| 23 June | Devonport | 8–6 | City | Devonport Domain |
| 3:00 | Try: Len Scott, Preston; Con: Alf Scott | | Try: Williams, Crouch | Referee: Les Bull |

==== Round 9 ====
| 30 June | Newton | 23–16 | Devonport | Carlaw Park 1 |
| 2:45 | Try: Roy Hardgrave 3, Murray, Wally Somers; Con: Craddock Dufty 4 | | Try: Len Scott 3, J Beattie; Con: Alf Scott 2 | Attendance: 4000; Referee: Les Bull |

| 30 June | Richmond | 10–9 | Marist | Carlaw Park 2 |
| 2:45 | Try: Wheaton, Trevor Hanlon; Con: L Taylor 2 | | Try: George Batchelor, Dick Moisley, Bernard Sweeney | Attendance: 4000; Referee: T Hill |

| 30 June | Ponsonby | 2–0 | City | Auckland Domain 2 |
| 3:00 | Pen: Frank Delgrosso | | | Referee: H McKubrey |

==== Round 10 ====
Jim O'Brien returned to the field for Marist after retiring at the end of the 1927 season. He had played for the All Blacks in 1922 before switching to rugby league in 1924. He had played for the New Zealand rugby league side in 1924 and would make the national team again later this season before going on to play 2 more seasons for the Marist side retiring finally in 1930.

| 7 July | Ponsonby | 17–3 | Newton | Carlaw Park 1 |
| 3:00 | Try: Cyril Thompson, Frank Delgrosso, Donovan; Con: Frank Delgrosso 3 Pen: Frank Delgrosso | | Try: Trevor Hall | Referee: Percy Rogers |

| 7 July | Marist | 14–13 | Devonport | Carlaw Park 2 |
| 3:00 | Try: Hec Brisbane 2, William Noble, Jim O'Brien; Con: Charles Gregory | | Try: Len Scott, Allan Seagar, Stanley Rule; Con: Allan Seagar, Alf Scott | Referee: T Chernside |

| 7 July | Ellerslie | 22–2 | City | Carlaw Park 1 |
| 1:30 | Try: Hemingway, Davis, V Speight, Ivan Littlewood; Con: Hemingway 3 Pen: Hemingway | | Pen: Laurie Barchard | Referee: H McKubrey |

==== Round 11 ====
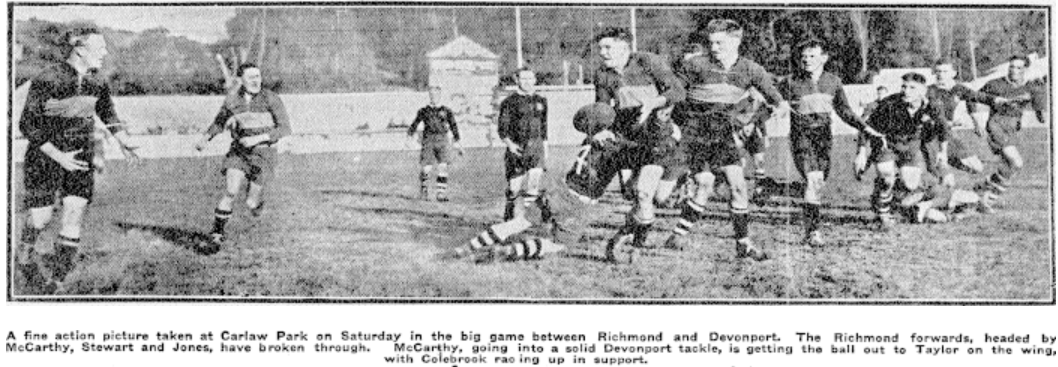

| 14 July | Richmond | 16–14 | Devonport | Carlaw Park 1 |
| 3:00 | Try: Ralph Jenkinson, G Stewart, L Taylor, Colebrook; Con: L Taylor 2 | | Try: Stanley Rule, J Beattie, Allan Seagar, Len Scott; Con: Alf Scott | Attendance: 5000; Referee: William Mincham |

| 14 July | Ponsonby | 11–11 | Marist | Carlaw Park 2 |
| 3:00 | Try: Kenneth Peckham, Joseph Peckham, Leslie Letton; Con: Frank Delgrosso | | Try: William Noble, Hec Brisbane, Phil Brady; Con: Charles Gregory | Attendance: 5000; Referee: Bert Emirali |

| 14 July | Newton | 5–2 | Ellerslie | Auckland Domain 1 |
| 3:00 | Try: C Rhodes; Con: Craddock Dufty | | Pen: Hemingway | Referee: T Hill |

==== Round 12 ====
The New Zealand team was playing the 2nd test against England in Dunedin this weekend so all the Auckland players in the New Zealand side were unavailable for their club sides.

| 18 August | Ponsonby | 13–13 | Richmond | Carlaw Park 1 |
| 3:00 | Try: George Gardiner 2, C 'Dooley' Moore; Con: George Gardiner 2 | | Try: Colebrook, Jones, Dixon; Con: L Taylor 2 | Referee: H McKubrey |

| 18 August | City | 31–5 | Newton | Carlaw Park 2 |
| 3:00 | Try: George Perry, Bill Hamilton 2, C Reynolds 2, Lawrence 2 Con: Laurie Barchard 4 Pen: Laurie Barchard | | Try: Alan Clarke; Con: Alan Clarke | Referee: Percy Rogers |

| 18 August | Ellerslie | 11–0 | Marist | Carlaw Park 1 |
| 1:45 | Try: Ivan Littlewood, Hemingway, V Speight; Con: Edward Crewther | | | Referee: Les Bull |

==== Round 13 ====
William Mincham refereed approximately his 50th ever senior club match in the game at Ellerslie Reserve between Ellerslie and Richmond. He had begun refereeing in 1920 after retiring from playing. Mincham had represented Auckland and his son Ted Mincham and grandson Robert Mincham both represented New Zealand.

| 25 August | Devonport | 24–6 | Ponsonby | Carlaw Park 1 |
| 3:00 | Try: Horace Dixon, Jim O'Brien 2, Trevor O'Leary, Ernest Ruby, Allan Seagar; Con: Alf Scott 2, Ernest Ruby | | Try: Bert Payne, Ford | Referee: Les Bull |

| 25 August | City | 14–10 | Marist | Carlaw Park 2 |
| 3:00 | Try: C Reynolds 2, George Perry, Lawrence; Con: Laurie Barchard | | Try: Gordon Campbell, Petherick; Con: Charles Gregory; Pen: Charles Gregory | Referee: Arthur Rae |

| 25 August | Ellerslie | 8–10 | Richmond | Ellerslie Reserve |
| 3:00 | Try: Ivan Littlewood 2 Con: Selby Crewther | | Try: J Swift, L Taylor; Con: L Taylor; Drop: L Taylor | Referee: William Mincham |

==== Round 14 ====
| 1 September | Devonport | 33–16 | Ellerslie | Carlaw Park 1 |
| 3:00 | Try: Len Scott 2, Alf Scott, Trevor O'Leary, Jim O'Brien, Ernest Ruby, Stan Webb; Con: Alf Scott 3, Allan Seagar 2 Drop: Lyndsay Simons | | Try: Allan, Ivan Littlewood; Con: J Hemingway 2 Pen: J Hemingway 3 | Referee: Percy Rogers |

| 1 September | City | 17–2 | Richmond | Carlaw Park 2 |
| 3:00 | Try: William McLaughlin, Joe Hadley, George Perry, Bill Hadley, Lawrence; Con: Horne | | Drop: L Taylor | Referee: William Mincham |

| 1 September | Newton | 10–2 | Marist | Carlaw Park 1 |
| 1:45 | Try: Roy Hardgrave, M Little; Con: M Little; Pen: Joy | | Pen: Charles Gregory | Referee: A Saunders |

=== Roope Rooster Knockout Competition ===
Marist won the Roope Rooster for 1928 after defeating Ponsonby in a closely contested final. It was the first time they had won the trophy in their history.

==== Round 1 ====
| 8 September | Newton | 25–16 | City | Carlaw Park 1 |
| 3:00 | Try: Trevor Hall, Wilson, Roy Hardgrave 3 Con: Craddock Dufty 5 | | Try: Lawrence, George Perry, James Everson, Joe Hadley; Con: Lawrence, Laurie Barchard | Referee: William Mincham |

| 8 September | Marist | 14–9 | Richmond | Carlaw Park 2 |
| 3:00 | Try: George Batchelor, Hec Brisbane, Dick Moisley, C McKay; Con: Hec Brisbane | | Try: Paterson; Con: L Taylor; Pen: L Taylor 2 | Referee: H McKubrey |

| 8 September | Devonport | 12–11 | Ellerslie | Carlaw Park 1 |
| 1:45 | Try: Les O'Leary, Horace Dixon; Con: Allan Seagar; Pen: Allan Seagar; Drop: Bill Cleaver | | Try: Ivan Littlewood, A Dance, Allen; Con: Selby Crewther | Referee: Arthur Rae |

==== Semifinals ====
Extra time was played in the Ponsonby match with Newton. Craddock Dufty was tackled into touch going for a try and the match ended a 5–5 draw with a replay required the following weekend.

| 22 September | Newton | 5–5 | Ponsonby | Carlaw Park 1 |
| 3:15 | Try: M Little; Con: Craddock Dufty | | Try: Revell; Pen: Frank Delgrosso | Referee: Percy Rogers |

| 22 September | Marist | 10–5 | Devonport | Carlaw Park 2 |
| 3:00 | Try: Jim Johnson, Hec Brisbane; Con: Charles Gregory; Pen: Charles Gregory | | Try: Stanley Rule; Con: Lindsay Simons | Referee: William Mincham |

==== Semifinal Replay ====
| 29 September | Ponsonby | 8–6 | Newton | Carlaw Park 1 |
| 3:00 | Try: Bert Payne, Lou Hutt; Con: Frank Delgrosso | | Try: Little, Roy Hardgrave | Referee: William Mincham |

==== Final ====
After being injured and stretchered from the field the previous week Charles Gregory was moved from his regular fullback position to first five eighth with Jack Kirwan at second five eighth and Hec Brisbane at centre. The three of them combined brilliantly in their sides win. The Marist hooker Jim Johnson was sent off after a skirmish with Ponsonby forward Dooley Moore in the second half.

| 6 October | Marist | 10–8 | Ponsonby | Carlaw Park 1 |
| 3:00 | Try: Bill Noble, F Hansen; Con: Charles Gregory 2 | | Try: George Gardiner, Ken Peckham; Pen: Frank Delgrosso | Attendance: 7,000; Referee: A Saunders |

=== Stormont Memorial Shield ===
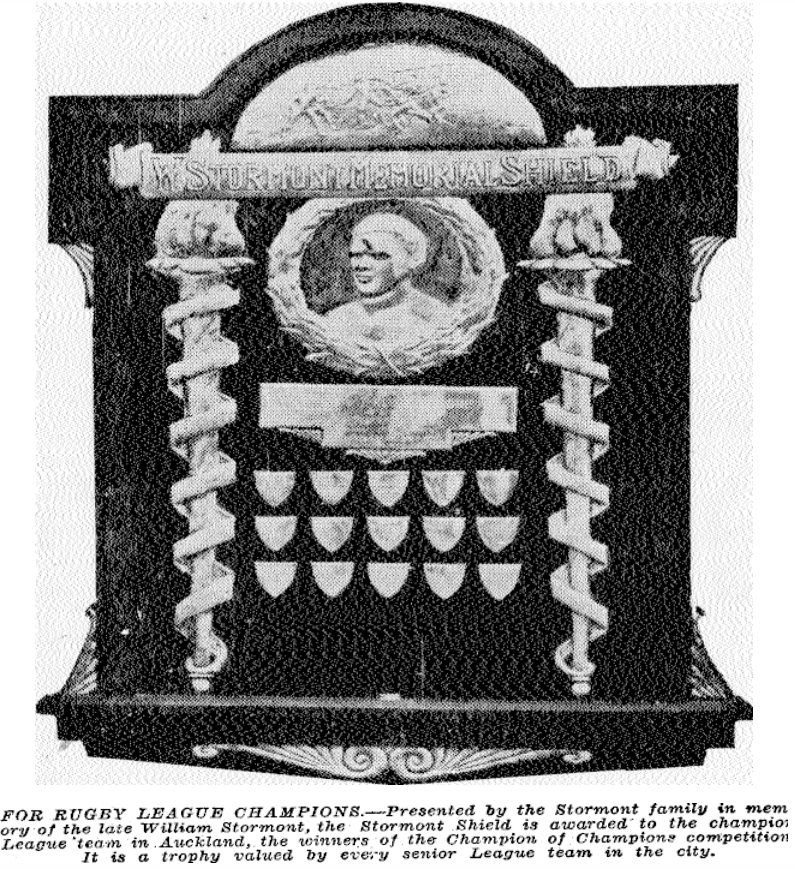

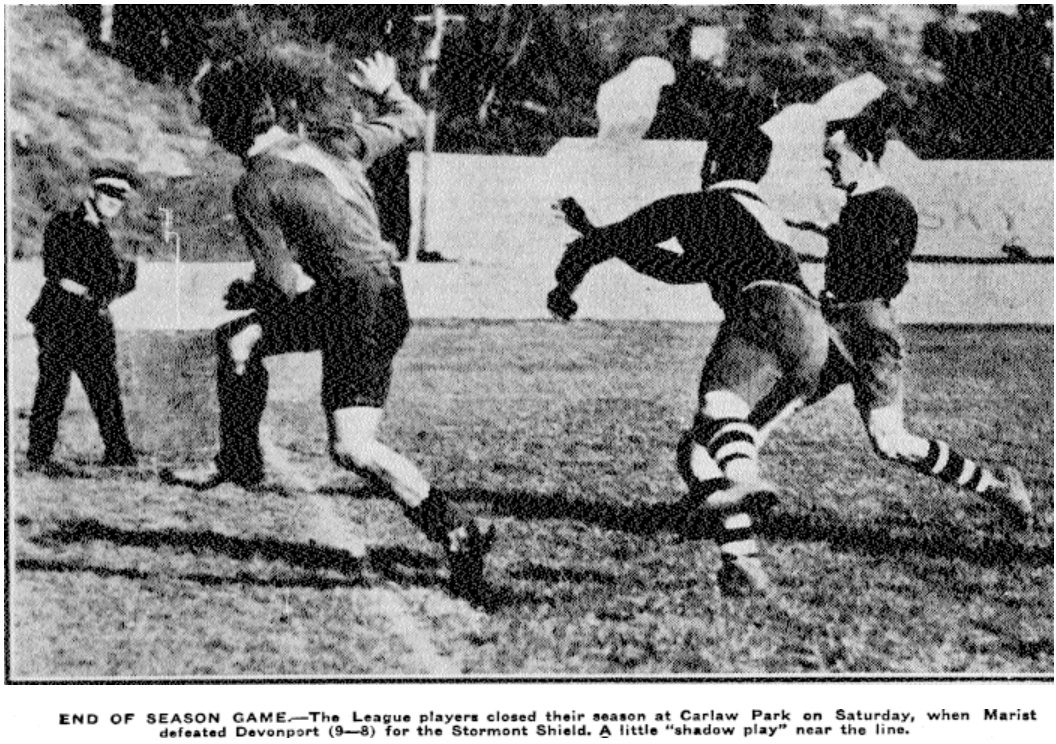

Marist won the Stormont Shield (named after their former teammate William (Bill) Stormont) for the first time when they defeated the Monteith Shield champions Devonport with a late try by 9 points to 8. Bill Stormont's younger brother Jim played his first game of the year in the memorial match for his brother and scored a try in Marist's win. Remarkably it was the fifth time the teams had met this season with Marist winning four (3-0, 14-13, 10-5, 9-8), and Devonport's lone win a round 3 victory by 31-22.

| 13 October | Marist | 9–8 | Devonport | Carlaw Park 1 |
| 3:00 | Try: Hec Brisbane, Jim Stormont, F Hansen | | Try: Trevor O'Leary 2 Con: Lindsay Simons | Attendance: 4,000; Referee: Les Bull |

=== Labour Day Tournament ===
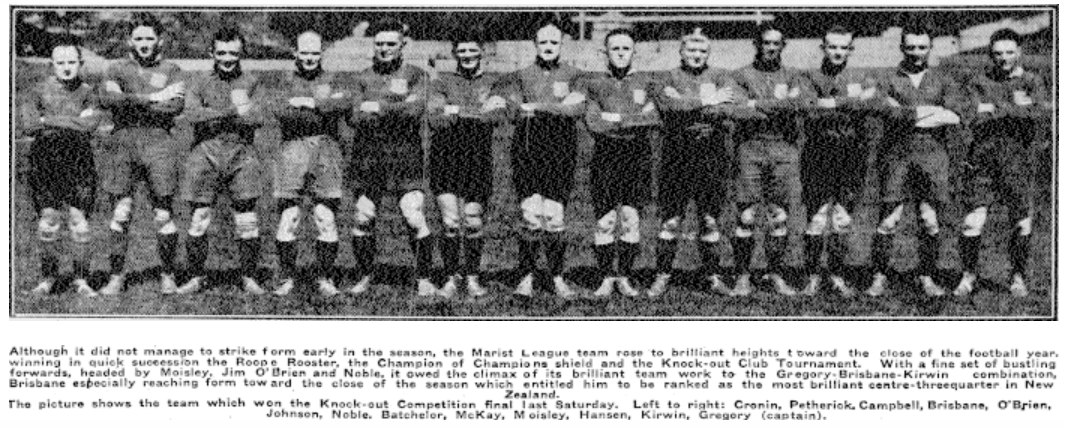

The ‘Labour Day Tournament’ was played over two days (the official holiday, and the following Saturday). It featured Huntly from the Lower Waikato competition and Pt Chevalier who had won the second grade competition. Marist won the trophy despite having to win two games on the first day, and two more on the second. For their efforts they were awarded £50 in prize money. Future international Ted Mincham made his debut for Richmond and scored a try.

==== Round 1 ====
| 20 October | Marist | 12–10 | Huntly | Carlaw Park 1 |
| 2:00 | Try: George Batchelor, Bill Noble, F Hansen, Petherick | | Try: S Grooby, Tom Timms; Con: Jones, Stan Rayner | Referee: Arthur Rae |

| 20 October | City | 11–3 | Devonport | Carlaw Park 1 |
| 3:00 | Try: George Perry 2, William McLaughlin; Con: Laurie Barchard | | Try: Trevor O’Leary | Referee: H McKubrey |

| 20 October | Richmond | 11–5 | Newton | Carlaw Park 2 |
| 3:00 | Try: Bill Davis, Colebrook, Ted Mincham; Con: Eric (Mick) Carroll | | Try: Roy Hardgrave; Pen: Craddock Dufty | Referee: T Chernside |

| 20 October | Ponsonby | 25–13 | Pt Chevalier | Carlaw Park 2 |
| 4:00 | Try: Cyril Thompson 2, Frank Delgrosso 2, Ken Peckham, Revell, Dooley Moore; Con: Frank Delgrosso | | Try: McPherson, Carroll, Monoghan; Con: Robert Purdy | Referee: Percy Rogers |

| 20 October | Marist | 11–8 | Ellerslie | Carlaw Park 1 |
| 4:00 | Try: Phil Brady, Dick Moisley, George Batchelor; Con: William Noble | | Try: Ivan Littlewood, Capner; Pen: Crewther |

==== Semifinals ====
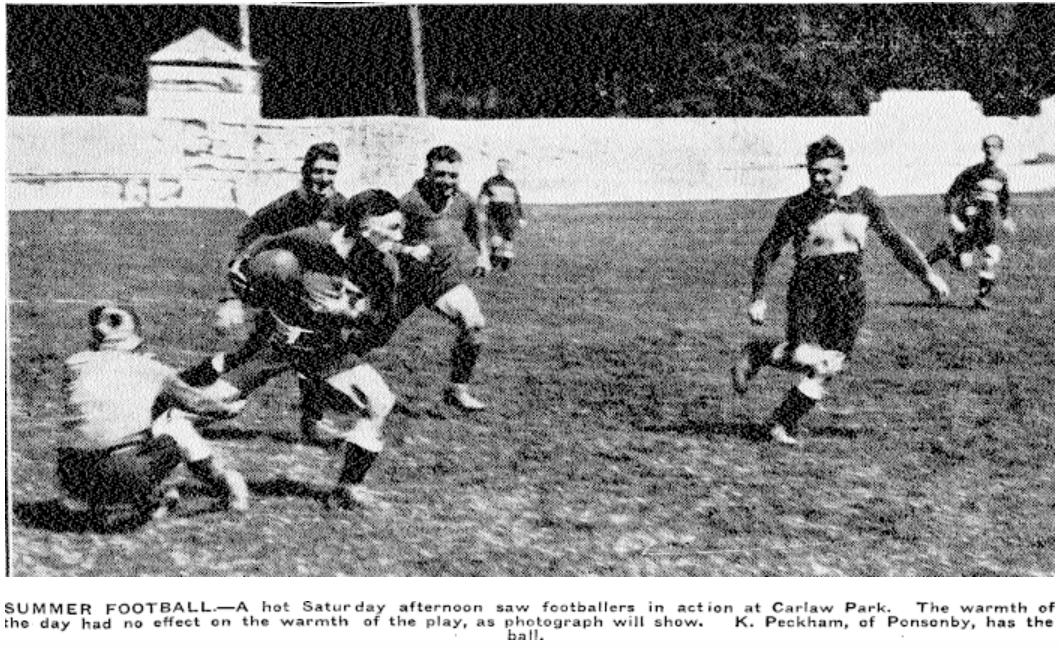

| 27 October | Richmond | 11–5 | Ponsonby | Carlaw Park 1 |
| 2:00 | Try: L Taylor 3 Con: L Taylor | | Try: Crooks; Con: Frank Delgrosso | Attendance: 2,500; Referee: Les Bull |

| 27 October | Marist | 17–12 | City | Carlaw Park 2 |
| 2:00 | Try: George Batchelor 3, Charles Gregory, Jim O'Brien; Con: Charles Gregory | | Try: George Perry 2 Con: Laurie Barchard 2 Pen: Laurie Barchard | Attendance: 2,500; Referee: H McKubrey |

==== Final ====
| 27 October | Marist | 12–5 | Richmond | Carlaw Park 1 |
| 4:00 | Try: Jim O'Brien, Jock Graham, George Batchelor, Hec Brisbane | | Try: Ted Mincham; Drop: L Taylor | Attendance: 2,500; Referee: Percy Rogers |

=== A Division B Division promotion-relegation match ===
For the second year in a row Ellerslie United and Grafton Athletic met in a match to decide who would play in the Senior A Division in 1929. Ellerslie scored a converted try in the closing stages of the match to remain in the A Grade.

| 6 October | Ellerslie | 15–13 | Grafton | Carlaw Park 2 |
| 3:00 | Try: V Speight, Allen, Davis; Con: Selby Crewther 2 Pen: Selby Crewther | | Try: N York, York jun., Allen; Con: Ralph Longville; Pen: Ralph Longville | Attendance: 7,000; Referee: Bert Emirali |

=== Top try scorers and point scorers ===
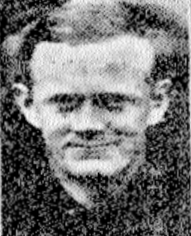
L (Snowy) Taylor of Richmond, top scorer.

Top try and point scorers for Dick Stack Benefit Games, A Division, Roope Rooster, Stormont Shield and Labour Day competitions (the competitions A Division teams competed in).

Top try scorers
| Rk | Player | Team | Gms | Tries |
|---|---|---|---|---|
| 1 | Len Scott | Devonport | 15 | 19 |
| 2 | Roy Hardgrave | Newton | 15 | 13 |
| 3 | George Perry | City | 13 | 12 |
| 4 | Hec Brisbane | Marist | 15 | 11 |
| 5 | Lawrence | City | 12 | 10 |
| 6= | George Batchelor | Marist | 14 | 9 |
| 6= | L Taylor | Richmond | 16 | 9 |
| 8= | Dick Moisley | Marist | 16 | 8 |
| 8= | Ivan Littlewood | Ellerslie | 12 | 8 |
| 10 | Bert Payne | Ponsonby | 13 | 7 |

Top point scorers
| Rk | Player | Team | G | T | C | P | Pts | |
|---|---|---|---|---|---|---|---|---|
| 1 | L Taylor | Richmond | 16 | 9 | 19 | 14 | 2 | 97 |
| 2 | Frank Delgrosso | Ponsonby | 12 | 5 | 15 | 12 | 0 | 69 |
| 3 | Len Scott | Devonport | 15 | 19 | 0 | 0 | 0 | 57 |
| 4 | Craddock Dufty | Newton | 14 | 0 | 20 | 7 | 0 | 54 |
| 5 | Charles Gregory | Marist | 16 | 1 | 19 | 3 | 0 | 47 |
| 6 | Alf Scott | Devonport | 13 | 3 | 16 | 0 | 0 | 41 |
| 7 | Roy Hardgrave | Newton | 15 | 13 | 0 | 0 | 0 | 39 |
| 8 | George Perry | City | 13 | 12 | 0 | 0 | 1 | 38 |
| 9 | Laurie Barchard | City | 16 | 2 | 9 | 6 | 0 | 36 |
| 10 | Hec Brisbane | Marist | 15 | 11 | 1 | 0 | 0 | 35 |

== Norton Cup (B Grade standings and results) ==
=== Norton Cup standings ===
| Team | Pld | W | D | L | F | A | Pts |
|---|---|---|---|---|---|---|---|
| Grafton Athletic | 12 | 10 | 2 | 0 | 145 | 69 | 22 |
| Otahuhu Rovers | 12 | 7 | 1 | 4 | 123 | 115 | 15 |
| Kingsland Rovers | 12 | 6 | 0 | 6 | 130 | 105 | 12 |
| Māngere United | 12 | 5 | 1 | 6 | 139 | 89 | 11 |
| Parnell | 12 | 5 | 1 | 6 | 118 | 127 | 11 |
| Point Chevalier | 12 | 4 | 1 | 7 | 104 | 138 | 9 |
| Northcote & Birkenhead Ramblers | 12 | 1 | 0 | 11 | 52 | 171 | 2 |

=== Norton Cup results ===
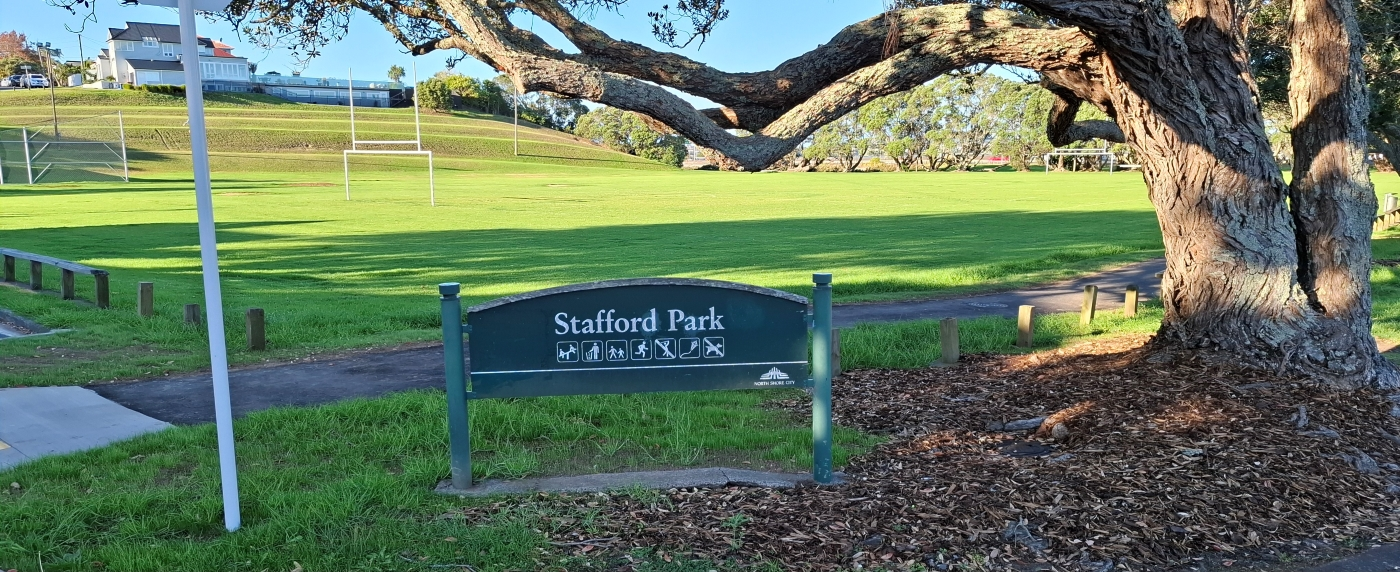
Stafford Park in Northcote. It was the original home ground for the Northcote club before they later moved to the Birkenhead War Memorial Domain.

Round 1 saw the opening of the new municipal ground (Stafford Park) at Northcote prior to Northcote and Birkenhead Ramblers match with Point Chevalier. The ground was opened by Northcote Mayor A. E. Greenslade who kicked off the ball to start the match. It was approximately the 21st ground in Auckland that had hosted an official senior club rugby league match. During the season Otahuhu asked the Otahuhu Borough Council for permission to take up a collection at the Princes St. Reserve and they also asked the council if they would erect a building. The council agreed to the collection but declined in regards to the building. On June 9 Sturges Park in Ōtāhuhu was used for the first time for an official senior rugby league game when Ōtāhuhu beat Māngere 7 to 5. Prior to the Round 11 matches Wirenui Mapi, the halfback of the Mangere team died after a short illness. The team wore white armbands for their match with Newton in honour of him.

Grafton Athletic won the competition after an undefeated season.

Fixtures
| | Date | | Score | | Score | Venue |
| Round 1 | 28 April | Parnell | 13 | Mangere | 5 | Carlaw Park # 2, 3:15pm |
| – | 28 April | Northcote | 10 | Point Chevalier | 9 | Stafford Park, Northcote, 3pm |
| – | 28 April | Otahuhu | 13 | Grafton | 15 | Otahuhu Reserve, 3pm |
| Round 2 | 5 May | Grafton | 12 | Parnell | 12 | Auckland Domain # 1, 3pm |
| – | 5 May | Mangere | 8 | Kingsland | 5 | Auckland Domain # 3, 3pm |
| – | 5 May | Point Chevalier | 5 | Otahuhu | 5 | Point Chevalier, 3pm |
| Round 3 | 12 May | Grafton | 12 | Kingsland | 5 | Auckland Domain # 6, 3pm |
| – | 12 May | Otahuhu | 14 | Northcote | 0 | Victoria Park, 3pm |
| – | 12 May | Point Chevalier | 8 | Parnell | 14 | Point Chevalier, 3pm |
| Round 4 | 19 May | Grafton | 11 | Mangere | 8 | Auckland Domain # 1, 3pm |
| – | 19 May | Kingsland | 30 | Point Chevalier | 7 | Auckland Domain # 5, 3pm |
| – | 19 May | Parnell | 7 | Northcote | 5 | Victoria Park # 2, 3pm |
| Round 5 | 26 May | Northcote | 5 | Kingsland | 9 | Stafford Park, Northcote, 3pm |
| – | 26 May | Otahuhu | 8 | Parnell | 5 | Otahuhu Reserve, 3pm |
| – | 26 May | Point Chevalier | 5 | Mangere | 11 | Point Chevalier, 3pm |
| Round 6 | 2 June | Mangere | 13 | Northcote | 5 | Victoria Park, 3pm |
| – | 2 June | Otahuhu | 3 | Kingsland | 8 | Otahuhu Reserve, 3pm |
| – | 2 June | Point Chevalier | 0 | Grafton | 12 | Point Chevalier, 3pm |
| Round 7 | 9 June | Northcote | 2 | Grafton | 24 | Stafford Park, Northcote, 3pm |
| – | 9 June | Ōtāhuhu | 7 | Māngere | 5 | Sturges Park, Otahuhu, 3pm |
| – | 9 June | Kingsland | 19 | Parnell | 10 | Auckland Domain # 2, 3pm |
| Round 8 | 23 June | Point Chevalier | 17 | Northcote | 3 | Point Chevalier, 3pm |
| – | 23 June | Grafton | 15 | Otahuhu | 0 | Auckland Domain # 2, 3pm |
| – | 23 June | Mangere | 32 | Parnell | 18 | Mangere Trotting Club, 3pm |
| Round 9 | 30 June | Otahuhu | 22 | Point Chevalier | 9 | Sturges Park, Otahuhu, 3pm |
| – | 30 June | Grafton | 13 | Parnell | 8 | Auckland Domain # 6, 3pm |
| – | 30 June | Kingsland | 6 | Mangere | 3 | Otahuhu Trotting Track, 3pm |
| Round 10 | 7 July | Grafton | 8 | Kingsland | 3 | Auckland Domain # 1, 3pm |
| – | 7 July | Otahuhu | 8 | Northcote | 6 | Victoria Park, 3pm |
| – | 7 July | Point Chevalier | 8 | Parnell | 5 | Outer Domain, 3pm |
| Round 11 | 14 July | Grafton | 3 | Mangere | 3 | Carlaw Park # 1, 1:45pm |
| – | 14 July | Parnell | 18 | Northcote | 3 | Victoria Park, 3pm |
| – | 14 July | Point Chevalier | 19 | Kingsland | 8 | Point Chevalier, 3pm |
| Round 12 | 18 Aug | Otahuhu | 14 | Parnell | 8 | Auckland Domain # 5, 3pm |
| – | 18 Aug | Kingsland | 16 | Northcote | 5 | Outer Domain, 3pm |
| – | 18 Aug | Mangere | 6 | Point Chevalier | 7 | Victoria Park, 3pm |
| Round 13 | 25 Aug | Grafton | 11 | Point Chevalier | 10 | Victoria Park # 2, 3pm |
| – | 25 Aug | Mangere | 27 | Northcote | 3 | Auckland Domain # 2, 3pm |
| – | 25 Aug | Otahuhu | 25 | Kingsland | 21 | Auckland Domain # 6, 3pm |
| Round 14 | 1 Sep | Grafton | 9 | Northcote | 5 | Victoria Park, 3pm |
| – | 1 Sep | Mangere | 18 | Otahuhu | 6 | Auckland Domain, 3pm |
| – | 1 Sep | Parnell | WBD | Kingsland | LBD | Outer Domain, 3pm |

=== Stallard Cup Knockout Competition ===
In the first round of matches the referee (Mr. Hill) in the Otahuhu v Kingsland game stopped play early and awarded the game to Kingsland due to the rough play of the Otahuhu side. There were several fights during the match and the referee had difficulty keeping spectators off the field. According to the writer in the NZ Herald this “was not the first time the spectators at Otahuhu had made trouble, and they were really the cause of the players getting out of hand”. The final saw Grafton and Point Chevalier tied at the end of normal time necessitating two extra periods of five minutes before Monaghan of Point Chevalier kicked a penalty goal to win the cup. This handed Point Chevalier their first ever senior trophy.

1928 Stallard Cup Results
| | Date | | Score | | Score | Venue |
| Round 1 | 8 Sep | Point Chevalier | 15 | Mangere | 8 | Carlaw Park # 2, 1:45pm |
| – | 8 Sep | Grafton | 10 | Northcote | 2 | Auckland Domain # 1, 3pm |
| – | 8 Sep | Otahuhu | 5 | Kingsland | 8 | Otahuhu, 3pm |
| Semifinal | 22 Sep | Point Chevalier | 13 | Parnell | 6 | Point Chevalier, 3pm |
| Semifinal | 22 Sep | Grafton | 18 | Kingsland | 10 | Carlaw Park # 1, 1:45pm |
| Final | 30 Sep | Point Chevalier | 15 | Grafton | 13 | Carlaw Park # 2, 3pm |

== Other club matches and lower grades ==
=== Lower grade competitions ===
Richmond were awarded the Davis Points Shield for the most junior grade wins. They gained 75 points, with Devonport finishing second.

==== Second grade (Wright Cup) ====
Devonport United won the championship, 6 points clear of Remuera, Ponsonby and Newton. Many of the results were not reported so the final standings are incomplete and shows the trailing teams 8 points behind. Newton won the knockout competition with an 8-7 win over Ponsonby on September 8.

| Team | Pld | W | D | L | B | F | A | Pts |
|---|---|---|---|---|---|---|---|---|
| Devonport United | 12 | 10 | 0 | 1 | 1 | 77 | 40 | 20 |
| Remuera | 12 | 6 | 0 | 5 | 1 | 141 | 87 | 12 |
| Newton Rangers | 11 | 6 | 0 | 4 | 2 | 83 | 56 | 12 |
| Ponsonby United | 11 | 6 | 0 | 5 | 2 | 68 | 76 | 12 |
| Richmond Rovers | 12 | 3 | 0 | 9 | 1 | 39 | 117 | 6 |
| Māngere United | 6 | 0 | 0 | 6 | 0 | 2 | 34 | 0 |

==== Third grade open (Walker Shield) ====
The championship was won by Richmond who finished 2 competition points ahead of Mount Albert though with many results not reported the standings do not reflect this. Richmond also won the knockout competition when the defeated Mount Albert on October 27. Mangere United withdrew after defaulting in round 1.

| Team | Pld | W | D | L | B | F | A | Pts |
|---|---|---|---|---|---|---|---|---|
| Richmond Rovers | 15 | 13 | 2 | 0 | 1 | 191 | 23 | 28 |
| Mount Albert United | 15 | 11 | 1 | 3 | 1 | 148 | 31 | 23 |
| Grafton Athletic | 13 | 8 | 0 | 1 | 1 | 62 | 34 | 16 |
| Ellerslie United | 13 | 6 | 2 | 2 | 1 | 69 | 28 | 14 |
| New Lynn | 13 | 6 | 0 | 4 | 1 | 67 | 41 | 12 |
| Kingsland Rovers | 14 | 5 | 1 | 5 | 1 | 54 | 58 | 11 |
| Parnell | 9 | 4 | 1 | 4 | 2 | 55 | 46 | 9 |
| Otahuhu Rovers | 15 | 4 | 0 | 9 | 0 | 26 | 89 | 8 |
| Glen Eden Rovers | 13 | 3 | 0 | 5 | 2 | 37 | 46 | 6 |
| Ponsonby United | 14 | 3 | 0 | 9 | 0 | 68 | 163 | 6 |
| Devonport United B | 13 | 2 | 1 | 7 | 2 | 37 | 88 | 5 |
| Devonport United A | 14 | 1 | 0 | 6 | 1 | 31 | 51 | 2 |
| Northcote & Birkenhead Rambers | 14 | 0 | 1 | 10 | 1 | 30 | 177 | 1 |
| Māngere United | 1 | 0 | 0 | 1 | 0 | 0 | 0 | 0 |

==== Third grade intermediate ====
Won by Richmond who were unbeaten with 15 wins, 8 points clear of Ponsonby. They had scored 308 points and conceded only 28. They also won the knockout competition when they beat Newmarket 15-10 in the final on September 29. Newmarket had beaten Devonport 6-3 in one semi final, while Richmond defeated New Lynn in the other semi final. The Richmond team had been together for four seasons and won the competition each year as they progressed from sixth grade to third. They had only lost one championship match in that time. Grafton Athletic withdrew after 1 round so have not been included in the standings. Remuera withdrew after 9 rounds having lost all their matches to that point.

| Team | Pld | W | D | L | B | F | A | Pts |
|---|---|---|---|---|---|---|---|---|
| Richmond Rovers | 15 | 15 | 0 | 0 | 2 | 308 | 28 | 30 |
| Ponsonby United | 15 | 9 | 2 | 4 | 1 | 135 | 113 | 20 |
| Newmarket | 15 | 7 | 2 | 4 | 1 | 143 | 88 | 16 |
| City Rovers | 15 | 6 | 1 | 4 | 2 | 202 | 78 | 13 |
| Newton Rangers | 16 | 4 | 1 | 7 | 0 | 60 | 130 | 9 |
| Devonport United | 15 | 3 | 2 | 5 | 1 | 38 | 58 | 8 |
| Point Chevalier | 15 | 3 | 1 | 8 | 1 | 57 | 181 | 7 |
| New Lynn | 13 | 2 | 1 | 9 | 1 | 29 | 189 | 5 |
| Remuera | 8 | 0 | 0 | 7 | 1 | 6 | 105 | 0 |

==== Fourth grade (Hospital Cup) ====
Richmond won by Richmond, 2 pts clear of Remuera. Richmond also won the knockout competition when they beat Akarana in the final by 13 points to 8 on October 13. Richmond had beaten Remuera 3-2 in one semi final, while Akarana defeated City 11-3 in the other.

| Team | Pld | W | D | L | B | F | A | Pts |
|---|---|---|---|---|---|---|---|---|
| Richmond Rovers | 13 | 11 | 1 | 1 | 2 | 140 | 30 | 23 |
| Remuera | 15 | 10 | 1 | 2 | 1 | 129 | 42 | 21 |
| Akarana | 12 | 9 | 1 | 2 | 3 | 158 | 25 | 19 |
| City Rovers | 12 | 7 | 1 | 4 | 2 | 110 | 32 | 15 |
| Northcote & Birkenhead Ramblers | 13 | 5 | 0 | 5 | 1 | 78 | 48 | 10 |
| Otahuhu Rovers | 14 | 3 | 0 | 9 | 1 | 27 | 145 | 6 |
| Ponsonby United | 13 | 1 | 0 | 9 | 2 | 21 | 95 | 2 |
| Point Chevalier | 12 | 0 | 0 | 8 | 2 | 6 | 158 | 0 |
| Ellerslie United | 10 | 0 | 0 | 6 | 1 | 2 | 96 | 0 |
| Devonport United | 2 | 0 | 0 | 2 | 0 | 0 | 0 | 0 |

==== Fifth grade (Endean Shield) ====
Akarana won the championship by 6 clear points from Devonport. Devonport beat Richmond 15–7 in the knockout final on September 15. On July 14 the newly formed Mount Albert side entered a team mid season and played 4 matches before the conclusion of the competition. Browne Bros and Geddes were a side made up of the employees of a confectionery company which entered a team in the competition. Their only win came against the Mount Albert side on July 21 when they beat them 6-4.

| Team | Pld | W | D | L | B | F | A | Pts |
|---|---|---|---|---|---|---|---|---|
| Akarana | 11 | 11 | 0 | 0 | 2 | 266 | 11 | 22 |
| Devonport United | 10 | 7 | 0 | 3 | 3 | 93 | 32 | 15 |
| Grafton Athletic | 9 | 4 | 0 | 5 | 2 | 53 | 57 | 8 |
| Richmond Rovers | 11 | 4 | 0 | 6 | 1 | 50 | 63 | 8 |
| Browne Bros & Geddes | 11 | 1 | 0 | 10 | 2 | 19 | 254 | 2 |
| Mount Albert United | 4 | 0 | 0 | 3 | 0 | 4 | 87 | 0 |

==== Sixth grade A ====
Point Chevalier won the championship, 6pts clear of Richmond. Richmond won the knockout competition when they beat Newmarket 5-3 in the final on October 6. Richmond had beaten Northcote 27-7 in a semi final while Newmarket beat Point Chevalier 14-0 in the other semi final. Otahuhu withdrew after 9 rounds.

| Team | Pld | W | D | L | B | F | A | Pts |
|---|---|---|---|---|---|---|---|---|
| Point Chevalier | 16 | 14 | 0 | 2 | 1 | 105 | 29 | 28 |
| Richmond Rovers | 16 | 11 | 0 | 5 | 1 | 71 | 53 | 22 |
| Marist Old Boys | 16 | 9 | 1 | 5 | 1 | 144 | 53 | 19 |
| Newmarket | 15 | 7 | 2 | 4 | 1 | 46 | 22 | 16 |
| Akarana | 15 | 6 | 2 | 4 | 1 | 99 | 35 | 14 |
| Kingsland Rovers | 15 | 2 | 2 | 8 | 1 | 35 | 57 | 6 |
| Devonport United | 14 | 2 | 2 | 9 | 2 | 23 | 121 | 6 |
| Otahuhu Rovers | 8 | 1 | 1 | 5 | 1 | 16 | 89 | 3 |
| Northcote & Birkenhead Ramblers | 15 | 0 | 0 | 10 | 2 | 8 | 88 | 0 |

==== Sixth grade B (Myers Cup) ====
Point Chevalier won the championship with a 5 point gap back to Marist. Marist won the knockout competition with a 6-2 win over Point Chevalier in the final on September 29. Point Chevalier had beaten Richmond in one semi final, while Marist beat Devonport 11-6 in the other.

| Team | Pld | W | D | L | B | F | A | Pts |
|---|---|---|---|---|---|---|---|---|
| Point Chevalier | 13 | 11 | 2 | 0 | 1 | 133 | 8 | 24 |
| Marist Old Boys | 15 | 9 | 1 | 2 | 0 | 164 | 22 | 19 |
| Richmond Rovers | 17 | 7 | 2 | 3 | 2 | 107 | 41 | 16 |
| Devonport United | 14 | 8 | 0 | 4 | 1 | 120 | 80 | 16 |
| City Rovers | 15 | 6 | 0 | 4 | 0 | 67 | 58 | 12 |
| Akarana | 13 | 3 | 1 | 8 | 0 | 56 | 51 | 7 |
| Newton Rangers | 15 | 3 | 0 | 11 | 0 | 38 | 144 | 6 |
| Newmarket | 14 | 0 | 0 | 14 | 0 | 3 | 284 | 0 |

==== Schoolboys competition ====
Newmarket Primary School won the championship after the Newmarket club had formed in the same season. Otahuhu Schools won the final of the school knockout competition after defeating Onehunga Convent 13 to 3 on October 27. Otahuhu had beaten Newmarket 12-10 in their semi final while Onehunga Convent A beat Mount Albert Primary School 8-0 in the other semi final. Newton, Mount Albert, Otahuhu B, Onehunga Convent B, and Onehunga Convent C had entered teams for the knockout competition which began on September 8.

| Team | Pld | W | D | L | F | A | Pts |
|---|---|---|---|---|---|---|---|
| Newmarket Primary School | 11 | 10 | 0 | 1 | 169 | 10 | 20 |
| Otahuhu Schools | 11 | 9 | 1 | 1 | 192 | 28 | 19 |
| Richmond | 12 | 8 | 1 | 3 | 136 | 46 | 19 |
| Onehunga Convent | 11 | 5 | 1 | 5 | 107 | 99 | 11 |
| Ellerslie Primary School | 12 | 3 | 0 | 9 | 39 | 140 | 6 |
| Papatoetoe Primary School | 11 | 2 | 1 | 8 | 33 | 166 | 5 |
| Mangere Primary School | 12 | 1 | 0 | 11 | 41 | 222 | 2 |

=== Exhibition matches ===
==== Hikurangi v Richmond ====
Richmond traveled north to play Hikurangi in the first rugby league match in the area. The local rugby team had become dissatisfied with their treatment by the rugby union and had switched to the league code. Richmond won the match in poor weather by 5 points to 0. Due to the terrible conditions only about 50 spectators sheltered in the pavilion while there were half a dozen cars which spectators sat in and watched from. Some reports said the referee was Les Bull, the well known Auckland referee while others said the game was refereed by Richmond manager Ben Davis.

| 7 July | Hikurangi | 0-5 | Richmond | Hikurangi Recreation Ground |
| 3:00 | | | Try: G Stewart; Con: L Taylor | Attendance: 100; Referee: Les Bull or Ben Davis |

==== Ponsonby Tour Matches v Hikurangi ====
| 1 September | Hikurangi | 10–22 | Ponsonby | Hikurangi Recreation Ground |
| 3:00 | Try: C Meyers, Taylor; Pen: J Hamilton 2 | | Try: Leslie Letton 3, Lou Hutt, Ford, George Gardiner; Con: Kenneth Peckham 2 |

| 1 September | Hikurangi Juniors | 5–11 | Ponsonby Juniors | Hikurangi Recreation Ground |
| 12:30 | Try: O'Callaghan; Con: Unknown x 1 | | Try: Wilson 2, Ashby; Con: Fleming |

==== Hikurangi tour to Auckland ====
| 8 September | Ponsonby | 17–14 | Hikurangi | Carlaw Park 2 |
| 1:45 | Try: Crooks, Moore, Victor Fagan 2, Kenneth Peckham; Con: Frank Delgrosso | | Try: Bell, E Cunningham; Con: J Hamilton; Pen: J Hamilton, T Meyers; Drop: J Hamilton | Referee: B Emirali |

==== Exhibition matches ====
List of exhibition matches
| | Date | | Score | | Score | Venue | Referee | Attendance |
| Exhibition Match | 8 Aug | Hikurangi Juniors | 13 | Richmond B | 17 | Hikurangi | | |
| Exhibition Match | 15 Sep | Hikurangi | 23 | Parnell | 6 | Hikurangi Recreation Park | - | 400 |
| Exhibition Match | 6 Oct | North Auckland | 9 | Auckland Selection | 33 | Whangarei | - | 1,000 |
| Exhibition Match | 13 Oct | Northcote | 5 | Hamilton | 3 | Carlaw Park # 2, 3pm | - | |
| Exhibition Match | 20 Oct | Mount Albert 3rd Grade | 5 | Huntly Juniors | 15 | Carlaw Park # 1, 1pm | - | |

== Representative season ==
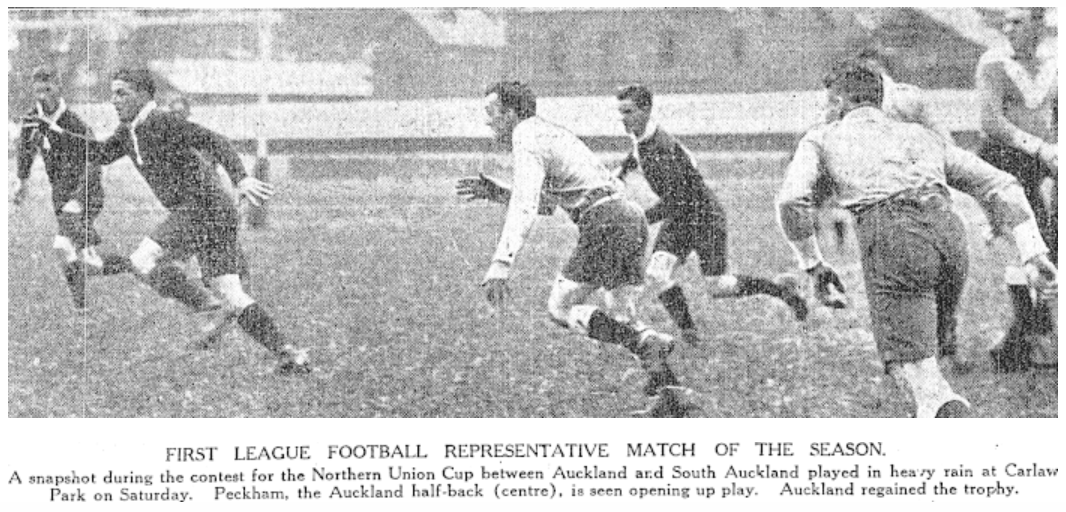

The first representative fixture of the season was played against South Auckland for the Northern Union Challenge Cup which the visitors had won from Auckland in 1927. Auckland won the 1928 match by 22 points to 3. The game was played in poor weather and was notable for the number of serious injuries with Stan Prentice of Auckland breaking his nose, W. Smith of Huntly suffering a severe back injury, and Stan Raynor of Huntly breaking his ribs. All three of them were taken to Auckland Hospital.

A midweek trial match was played between the Possibles and Probables in order to select the Auckland team which was due to play the touring England side later in the season.

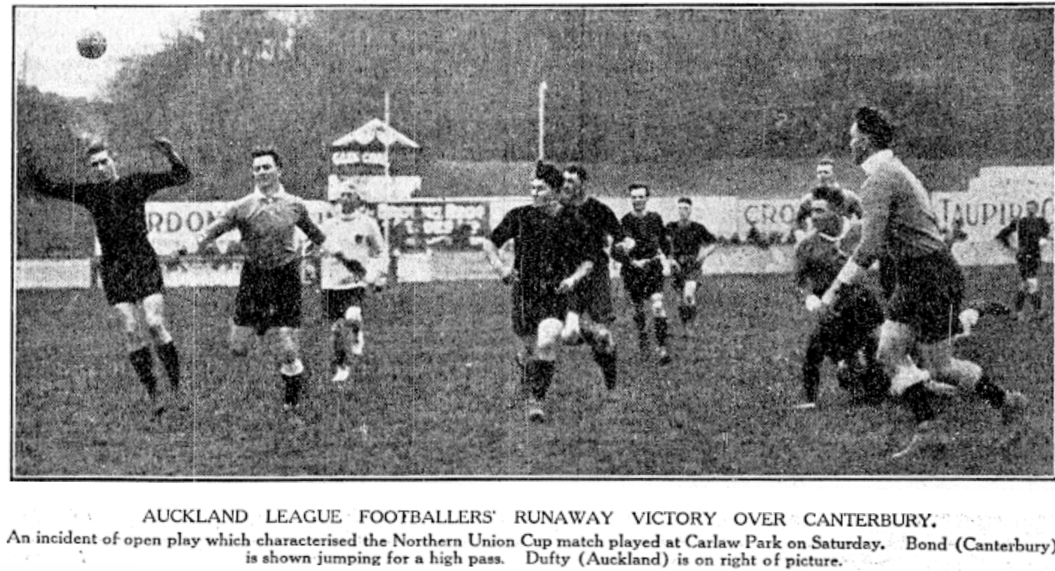

Auckland trounced Canterbury in a Northern Union Cup match by 66 points to 22 with winger Roy Hardgrave (son of former Kiwi Arthur Hardgrave) running in five tries. The match was played in good conditions for the most part and was witnessed by a large crowd of 15,000.

A North Island v South Island trial match was played at Carlaw Park. The North Island team fielded a large contingent of Auckland players including Craddock Dufty, Roy Hardgrave, Hec Brisbane, Maurice Wetherill, Stan Prentice, Frank Delgrosso, A. Scott, Lou Hutt, Wally Somers, and Jim O'Brien (Marist). The North Island team was far too good, winning 44 to 8. The following week a Probables v Possibles match was played as part of the selection process for the New Zealand team to play against the touring England side. The two teams featured the following Auckland players (Probables): Craddock Dufty, Len Scott, Hec Brisbane, Allan Seagar, Tim Peckham, Wally Somers, Jim O'Brien (Marist), Trevor Hall, Alf Scott, (Possibles): J Beattie, Trevor Hanlon, and Bill Cleaver.

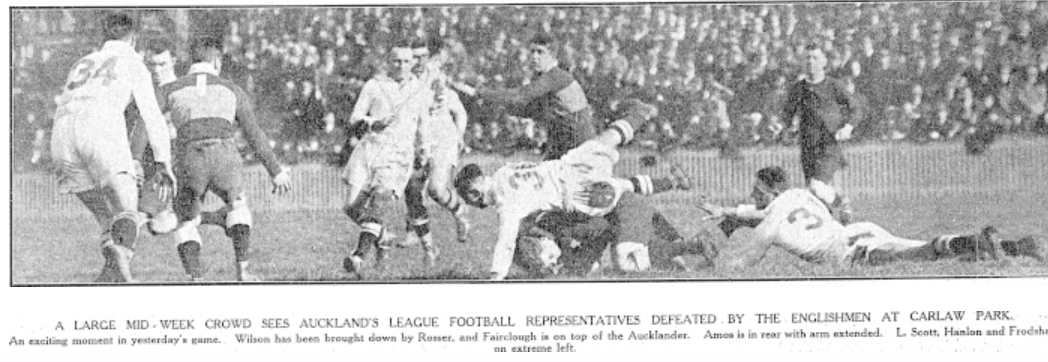

A match was also played by Auckland in Whangarei. This was the first time an Auckland representative team had played in Northland and they were up against a fledgling North Auckland side. The area was relatively lowly populated and it was thought that they could not sustain both competitive rugby union and rugby league sides. Auckland win relatively convincingly and rugby league was to continue to struggle in the area for some time. The final match of the season saw Auckland go down to South Auckland both physically and on the scoreboard by 21 points to 7. The Auckland team was below strength.

=== Representative fixtures and trials ===
==== Auckland v South Auckland (Northern Union C.C.) ====
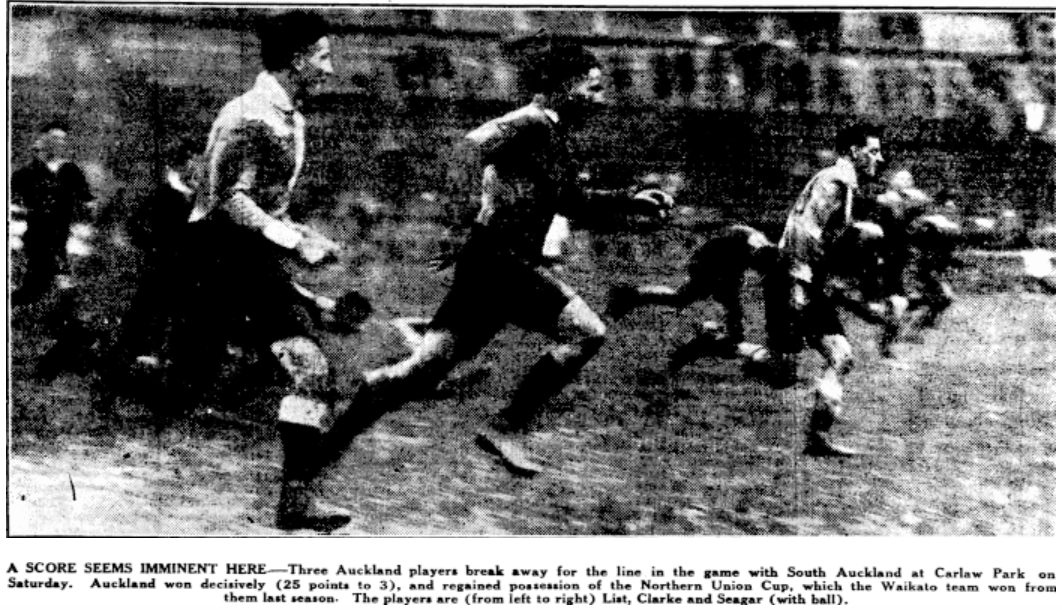

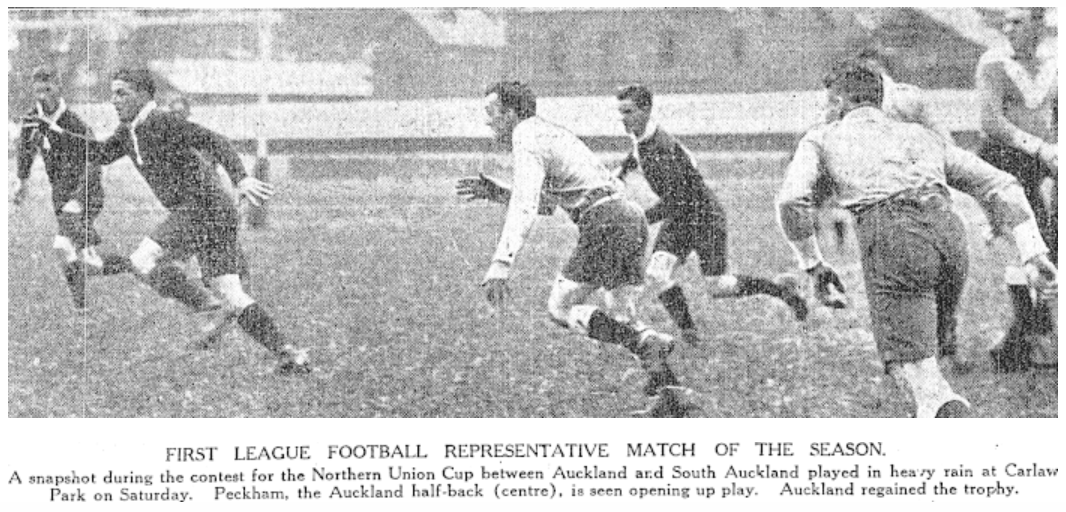

Stan Prentice of Auckland broke his nose, while W. Smith of South Auckland sustained serious injuries to his back and broken ribs. While Stan Raynor also of South Auckland broke ribs with all three players being admitted to Auckland Hospital.

| 16 June | Auckland | 22–3 | South Auckland | Carlaw Park 1 |
| 2:45 | Try: Len Scott, Claude List 2, Roy Hardgrave, Lou Hutt, Bert Payne; Con: Craddock Dufty 2 | | Try: L Williams | Attendance: 3,000; Referee: Les Bull |

==== Auckland trial match ====
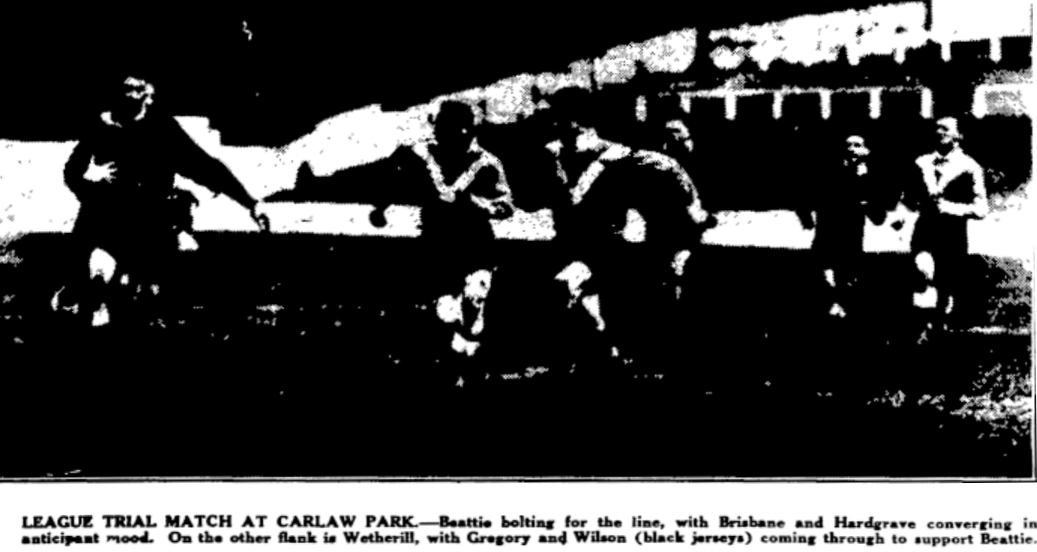

| 11 July | Auckland Probables | 14–24 | Auckland Possibles | Carlaw Park 1 |
| 2:30 | Try: Tim Peckham, Ralph Jenkinson, Joe Hadley, Dooley Moore; Con: Charles Gregory | | Try: Roy Hardgrave, Maurice Wetherill, Claude List, Stan Prentice 2, Trevor Hall; Con: Frank Delgrosso 2 Pen: Frank Delgrosso | Attendance: 1,500; Referee: H McKubrey |

==== Auckland v Canterbury ====
| 21 July | Auckland | 66–26 | Canterbury | Carlaw Park 1 |
| 3:00 | Try: Craddock Dufty 3, Claude List 2, Maurice Wetherill, Roy Hardgrave 5, Allan Seagar 3, Stan Prentice 2 Con: Craddock Dufty 2, Allan Seagar, Frank Delgrosso 4, Alan Clarke, Wally Somers | | Try: P Smith, J Spillane 3, E Consedine, E Spencer; Con: B O’Connell, P Smith, E Spencer; Pen: R Bond | Attendance: 15,000; Referee: R.T. Hill |

==== Auckland v South Auckland ====
| 25 July | Auckland | 17–19 | South Auckland | Carlaw Park 1 |
| 3:00 | Try: Len Scott 2, Claude List, Roy Hardgrave, Alan Clarke; Con: Tim Peckham | | Try: George Raynor, George Tittleton, Stan Raynor, Brownie Paki; Con: Stan Raynor; Pen: D Hall | Attendance: 2,500; Referee: William Mincham |

==== Inter Island Match ====
| 28 July | North Island | 44–8 | South Island | Carlaw Park 1 |
| 3:00 | Try: Roy Hardgrave 2, Hec Brisbane 3, Stan Raynor, Frank Delgrosso 2, Lou Hutt, Tom Timms; Con: Craddock Dufty, Frank Delgrosso 5 Pen: Craddock Dufty | | Try: J Spillane, Goodall; Con: J Spillane | Attendance: 10,000; Referee: Les Bull |

==== New Zealand Trial Match ====
| 1 August | NZ Probables | 27–24 | NZ Possibles | Carlaw Park 1 |
| 3:00 | Try: Ralph Longville 3, Allan Seagar, Wilson 2, Ralph Jenkinson; Con: Craddock Dufty 2, Wally Somers | | Try: J Spillane, Alf Townsend, Quinn, J Payne, Alan Clarke, McOliver; Con: J Beattie, Bert Eckhoff; Pen: Alan Clarke | Referee: H McKubrey |

==== England Tour Match ====
The entire Auckland Provincial team were Auckland club players aside from Joe Menzies

| 8 August | Auckland Province | 9–14 | England | Carlaw Park 1 |
| 3:00 | Try: Len Scott; Pen: Craddock Dufty 3 | | Try: Alf Frodsham, Les Fairclough, Emlyn Gwynne, Billo Rees; Con: Walter Gowers | Attendance: 15,000; Referee: Percy Rogers |

==== Auckland v England ====
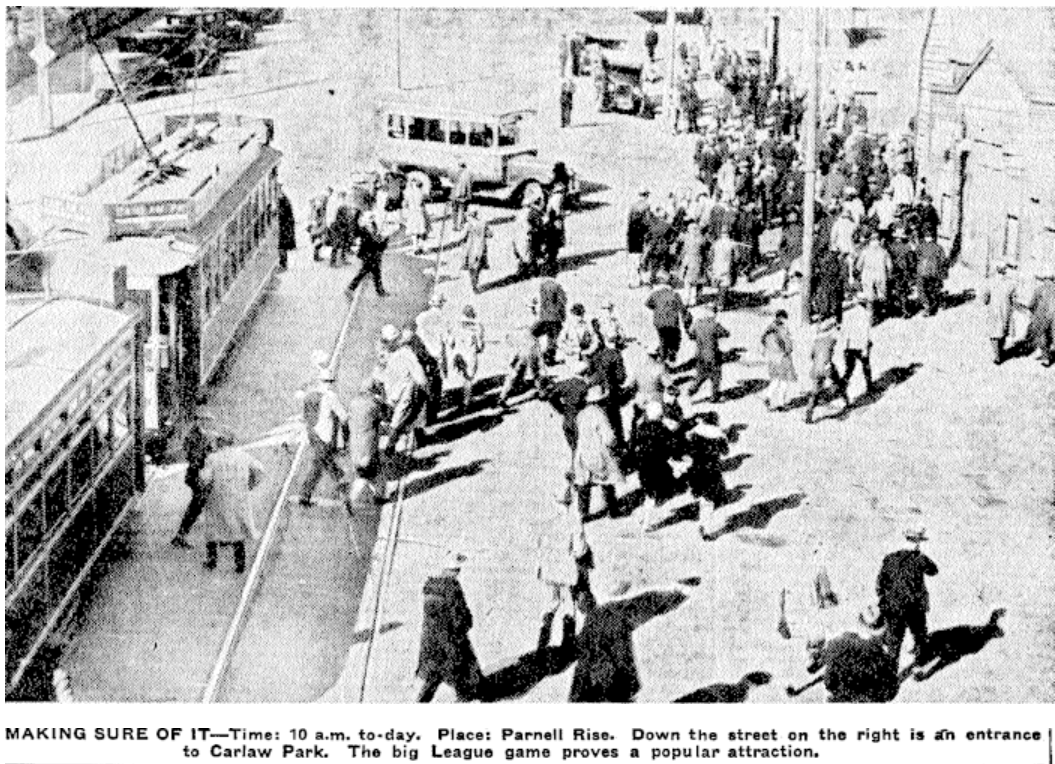
Crowd making their way to Carlaw Park.

| 11 August | Auckland | 15–26 | England | Carlaw Park 1 |
| 3:00 | Try: Len Scott, Roy Hardgrave, Alan Clarke; Con: Craddock Dufty 2 Drop: Craddock Dufty | | Try: Alf Ellaby, Jim Brough, Alf Frodsham, Billo Rees 2, Harold Bowman; Con: Jim Sullivan 4 | Attendance: 25,000; Referee: William Mincham |

==== Auckland v Otago (Northern Union C.C.) ====
| 15 September | Auckland | 42–22 | Otago | Carlaw Park 1 |
| 3:00 | Try: Roy Hardgrave 3, Len Scott, Hec Brisbane 3, Dick Moisley, Ernest Ruby 2 Con: Craddock Dufty 4, Frank Delgrosso 2 | | Try: W Clydesdale, R Cusack, J Timlin, T Hicks; Con: W Clydesdale 2 Pen: W Clydesdale, Bert Eckhoff 2 | Attendance: 6,000; Referee: Les Bull |

==== North Auckland v Auckland ====
| 6 October | North Auckland | 9–33 | Auckland | Kensington Park, Whangarei |
| 3:00 | Try: H Connolly, E Cunningham, J Hamilton | | Try: Claude List, Roy Hardgrave 2, Jones, Trevor Hall, Ernest Ruby, Ralph Jenkinson; Con: Craddock Dufty 4, Roy Hardgrave; Drop: Craddock Dufty | Attendance: 1,000; Referee: Les Bull |

==== Auckland v South Auckland ====
| 13 October | South Auckland | 21–7 | Auckland | Huntly Recreation Ground |
| | Try: Unknown x 21 points | | Try: Unknown x 7 points |

=== Auckland representative matches played and scorers ===
| No | Name | Club | Played | Tries | Con | Pen | DG | Points |
|---|---|---|---|---|---|---|---|---|
| 1 | Craddock Dufty | Newton | 5 | 3 | 14 | 0 | 2 | 41 |
| 1 | Roy Hardgrave | Newton | 6 | 13 | 1 | 0 | 0 | 41 |
| 3 | Claude List | Kingsland | 6 | 6 | 0 | 0 | 0 | 18 |
| 4 | Len Scott | Devonport | 5 | 5 | 0 | 0 | 0 | 15 |
| 5 | Frank Delgrosso | Ponsonby | 3 | 0 | 6 | 0 | 0 | 12 |
| 6 | Allan Seagar | Devonport | 4 | 3 | 1 | 0 | 0 | 11 |
| 7 | Ernest Ruby | Devonport | 3 | 3 | 0 | 0 | 0 | 9 |
| 7 | Hec Brisbane | Marist | 1 | 3 | 0 | 0 | 0 | 9 |
| 9 | Alan Clarke | Newton | 4 | 2 | 1 | 0 | 0 | 8 |
| 10 | Stan Prentice | Richmond | 4 | 2 | 0 | 0 | 0 | 6 |
| 11 | Lou Hutt | Ponsonby | 5 | 1 | 0 | 0 | 0 | 3 |
| 11 | Albert Payne | Ponsonby | 4 | 1 | 0 | 0 | 0 | 3 |
| 11 | Maurice Wetherill | City | 2 | 1 | 0 | 0 | 0 | 3 |
| 11 | Trevor Hall | Newton | 5 | 1 | 0 | 0 | 0 | 3 |
| 11 | Dick Moisley | Marist | 1 | 1 | 0 | 0 | 0 | 3 |
| 11 | W Jones | Richmond | 1 | 1 | 0 | 0 | 0 | 3 |
| 11 | Ralph Jenkinson | Richmond | 1 | 1 | 0 | 0 | 0 | 3 |
| 18 | Tim Peckham | Ponsonby | 3 | 0 | 1 | 0 | 0 | 2 |
| 18 | Wally Somers | Newton | 5 | 0 | 1 | 0 | 0 | 2 |
| 20 | Jim O'Brien | Marist | 3 | 0 | 0 | 0 | 0 | 0 |
| 20 | Edward Crewther | Ellerslie | 1 | 0 | 0 | 0 | 0 | 0 |
| 20 | Alf Scott | Devonport | 1 | 0 | 0 | 0 | 0 | 0 |
| 20 | Horace Dixon | Devonport | 1 | 0 | 0 | 0 | 0 | 0 |
| 20 | Trevor Hanlon | Richmond | 2 | 0 | 0 | 0 | 0 | 0 |
| 20 | B Davis | Ellerslie | 1 | 0 | 0 | 0 | 0 | 0 |
| 20 | G Rhodes | Newton | 1 | 0 | 0 | 0 | 0 | 0 |
| 20 | Bill Hamilton | City | 1 | 0 | 0 | 0 | 0 | 0 |
| 20 | M Little | Newton | 1 | 0 | 0 | 0 | 0 | 0 |
| 20 | Ralph Longville | City | 1 | 0 | 0 | 0 | 0 | 0 |
| 20 | L Taylor | Richmond | 1 | 0 | 0 | 0 | 0 | 0 |
| 20 | Jack Wilson jun. | Mangere | 1 | 0 | 0 | 0 | 0 | 0 |

== Auckland players selected for New Zealand ==
The following Auckland players were selected in the New Zealand team to play the first test versus England at Carlaw Park: Craddock Dufty (Newton), Roy Hardgrave (Newton), Claude List (Kingsland), Len Scott (Devonport), Maurice Wetherill (City), Stan Prentice (Richmond), Frank Delgrosso (Ponsonby), Lou Hutt (Ponsonby), Wally Somers (Newton), Jim O'Brien (Marist), Reserves: Tim Peckham (Ponsonby), and Trevor Hall (Newton). New Zealand won the test by 17 points to 13 in front of 27,000 spectators. Hec Brisbane who had not been considered for the first test due to injury was selected for the second test to be played in Dunedin and replaced Len Scott in the side.

== Annual general meetings and club news ==
Details of annual club meetings were as follows, along with notable news during the season.

- Akarana League Football Club held at Carlaw Park. They stated that the 1927 season had been successful with two of their three teams winning their grades.
- City Rovers Football Club held at Carlaw Park.
- Devonport United League Football Club held at the Buffalo Lodge Rooms on 19 March. During the season Devonport asked the Devonport Domain Board for permission to use the football ground for a match on 23 June and for the authority to charge spectators for entry. Permission was granted provided the charge did not exceed 1 shilling.
- Ellerslie United League Football Club held at their training shed opposite the Ellerslie Railway Station on 26 March.
- Glen Eden Rovers At the Auckland Rugby League's weekly Management Committee meeting in April they decided to give financial assistance to the Glen Eden Club toward paying off its ground.
- Grafton Athletic held at Leys Institute in Ponsonby.
- Kingland Rovers Football Club held at Buffalo Lodge Rooms on 25 March.
- Māngere United League Football Club held at Cook's Hall on 26 March. During the season Wirenui Hapi the halfback of the Mangere senior team died after a short illness. The Mangere team wore white arm bands on the jerseys for their round 11 match at Carlaw Park against Grafton.
- Marist Old Boys held at Donovan's Gymnasium in Parnell.
- Mt Albert held their first ever meeting at St George's Hall in Mt Albert. It was decided that they would form a club in Mt Albert although they did not decide on a name at this time. They entered teams in the third and fourth grades. During the season Auckland Rugby League made a grant of £3 to Mount Albert for a dressing shed.
- New Lynn League Football Club held at Foresters’ Hall, New Lynn on 28 March.
- Newton Rangers Football Club held at Nairn's Tea Rooms on Karangahape Road.
- Northcote-Birkenhead Ramblers League Football Club held at Foresters’ Hall, Birkenhead on 22 March.
- Parnell League Football Club held at Donovan's Gymnasium in Parnell. It was noted at the meeting that Parnell had lost its ground as the council was going to put roads through it. They were going to make arrangements to use the Auckland Domain for training purposes.
- Point Chevalier League Football Club held in the Point Chevalier Hall.
- Ponsonby United Football Club held at The Leys Institute in Ponsonby. Ponsonby were being called “Ponies” in the newspapers during the season. They played the newly formed Hikurangi during the season and also toured the area with a senior and junior team.
- Richmond Rovers Football Club became the first team to play a rugby league match in Northland when they met the Hikurangi side. Their coach for the season was Ben Davis.
- Auckland Rugby League Primary Schools’ Management Committee. It was stated that eight teams were entered in various competitions in 1927.
- Junior Management Committee held at Gray's Buildings on 27 March.
- Referees Association held at the League Rooms on 26 March. During the season they asked that a written report submitted by its members should suffice for players ordered from the field, rather than requiring them to attend judicial inquiries as it was difficult to attend.
