= Swin Hadley =

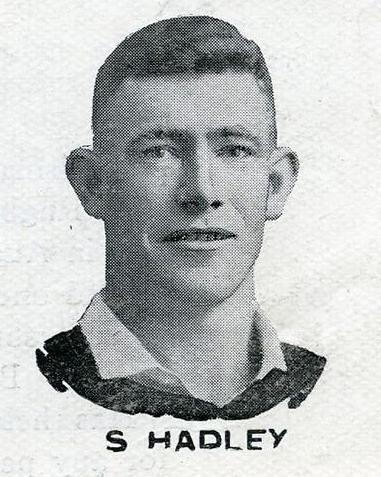
- Born: Swinbourne Hadley; 19 September 1904 Whangaroa, New Zealand
- Died: 29 April 1970 (aged 65) Auckland, New Zealand
- Height: 1.78 m (5 ft 10 in)
- Weight: 80 kg (180 lb)
- Notable relative: Bill Hadley (brother)

Rugby union career
- Position: Hooker
Provincial / State sides
Years	Team	Apps	(Points)
1926–35	Auckland	57	
International career
Years	Team	Apps	(Points)
1928	New Zealand	4	(0)

Swinbourne Hadley (19 September 1904 – 29 April 1970) was a New Zealand rugby union player. A hooker, Hadley represented Auckland at a provincial level, and was a member of the New Zealand national side, the All Blacks, on their 1928 tour to South Africa. He played 11 matches for the All Blacks on that tour, including all four Test matches.

On 30 March 1929, Hadley married Susan Cosnett at Sacred Heart Church, Ponsonby. During World War II, he served as a corporal with 24 Infantry Battalion, 2nd New Zealand Expeditionary Force, and was taken prisoner of war in Greece on 13 December 1941. He was later invalided home. Hadley died in Auckland on 29 April 1970, and he was buried at Waikumete Cemetery.
