= Bill Hadley (rugby union) =

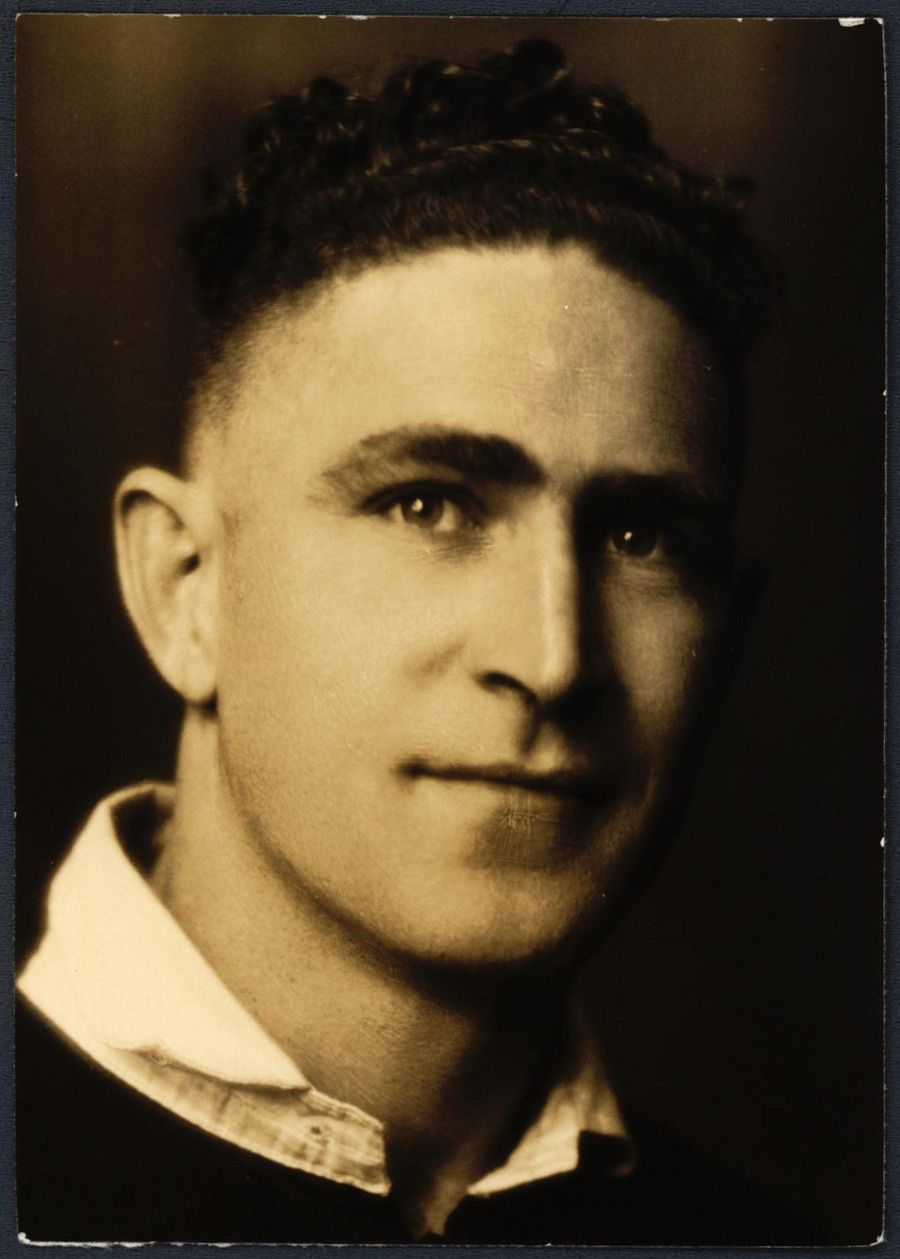
- William Edward Hadley in 1935

Personal information
- Born: William Edward Hadley; 11 March 1910 Auckland, New Zealand
- Died: 30 September 1992 (aged 82) Auckland, New Zealand
- Occupations: Carpenter, plasterer
- Height: 1.78 m (5 ft 10 in)
- Weight: 82 kg (181 lb)
- Spouse: Marion Patterson (m. 1934)
- Relatives: Swin Hadley (brother), Joe Hadley (brother)
- Rugby league career

Playing information
Club
Years	Team	Pld	T	G	FG	P
1928–30	City Rovers					6

Sport

Rugby union career
- Position: Hooker
Provincial / State sides
Years	Team	Apps	(Points)
1932	Bay of Plenty		
1933–37	Auckland		
International career
Years	Team	Apps	(Points)
1934–36	New Zealand	8	(6)

William Edward Hadley (11 March 1910 – 30 September 1992) was a New Zealand rugby union player. A hooker, Hadley represented Bay of Plenty and Auckland at a provincial level, and was a member of the New Zealand national side, the All Blacks, from 1934 to 1936. He played 25 matches for the All Blacks including eight internationals, scoring two Test tries.

He was selected by the editors of the 1935 Rugby Almanac of New Zealand as one of their 5 players of the year in 1934.

Hadley originally played rugby league, playing for the City Rovers club in Auckland from 1928 to 1930 before switching codes in 1931 and joining Marist. He played for City with his brother Joe for these three seasons in the forwards.

Hadley died in Auckland on 30 September 1992, and his ashes were buried at North Shore Memorial Park.
