= 1948 New Zealand rugby league season =

Seasons
- ← 1947 1949 →

The 1948 New Zealand rugby league season was the 41st season of rugby league that had been played in New Zealand.

== International competitions ==
The New Zealand rugby league returned from their tour of Great Britain and France. The Kiwis then toured Australia, drawing the eventual Test series at 1-all.They defeated Newcastle 10–9. The New Zealand squad included; Warwick Clarke, Jack Forrest, Maurie Robertson, Allan Wiles, Dave Redmond, Abbie Graham, Des Barchard, John Newton, captain Pat Smith, Albert Hambleton, Charlie McBride, Clarence Hurndell, Travers Hardwick and Rex Cunningham. No coach was taken on the tour of Australia.

On their return from the two tours New Zealand lost to a "fresh" Auckland side, 30–9. Auckland included Ray Cranch, Des White, Jack Russell-Green and Len Jordan.

The New South Wales Rugby League's champion Western Suburbs Magpies club traveled to Auckland. They lost to Ponsonby and Mount Albert before losing to Richmond 18–6. They then participated in a champion of champions match against the Auckland Rugby League's champion Marist side, winning 19–15.

== National competitions ==
=== Northern Union Cup ===
Wellington again held the Northern Union Cup at the end of the season. They accepted challenges from Wanganui and Taranaki but did not put the trophy on the line against Auckland.

=== Inter-island competition ===
The South Island defeated the North Island 21–18 in the annual fixture. The South Island included Jack Forrest, Pat Smith, Bob Aynsley, John Newton, Charlie McBride, Ken Mountford and Bob Neilson.

=== Inter-district competition ===
Auckland sent a team to Wellington and the South Island in July, and at the same time hosted South Auckland. Auckland opened their tour with a 14–5 defeat of Wellington before defeating Canterbury 32–22 at Athletic Park. They then played the West Coast at Wingham Park, losing 18–2. The Auckland touring squad was coached by Stan Prentice, managed by Bill Telford and included Ray Cranch, Clarence Hurndell, Rex Cunningham, Roy Roff, Morrie Rich, Arthur McInnarney, Jack Russell-Green, Len Jordan and Doug Anderson.

While one team was on tour Auckland hosted, and defeated, South Auckland 60–9 at Carlaw Park. This Auckland side included Roy Nurse, Warwick Clarke, Des Barchard, Vic Belsham, Dave Redmond, Joffre Johnson, Travers Hardwick, George Davidson and Maurie Robertson.

The West Coast included Ken Mountford and Charlie McBride.

== Club competitions ==
=== Auckland ===
Marist won the Auckland Rugby League's Fox Memorial Trophy. Marist and Richmond shared the Rukutai Shield. Mount Albert won the Roope Rooster and Stormont Shield while Newtown won the Sharman Cup.

Marist then hosted Runanga at Carlaw Park, winning 23–10 in a champion of champions match.

The City Rovers and Newton Rangers clubs amalgamated to form City Newton. The Northcote Tigers qualified for the first grade for the first time.

Marist included Des Barchard, Jimmy Edwards and George Davidson. Richmond included Graham Burgoyne, Dave Redmond and Maurie Robertson.

=== Wellington ===
Marist won the Wellington Rugby League's Appleton Shield.

=== Canterbury ===
Christchurch won the Canterbury Rugby League's Massetti Cup.

On 24 July Rakaia were led off during the match by their captain after a dispute with the referee who had sent a player off. It would be the last game of rugby league the club played as they were suspended by the Rugby League and did not return to the competition.

=== Other Competitions ===
Runanga won the West Coast Rugby League competition before defeating Christchurch 29–10 to win the Thacker Shield. Runanga included John Newton.
