= 1947 New Zealand rugby league season =

Seasons
- ← 1946 1948 →

The 1947 New Zealand rugby league season was the 40th season of rugby league that had been played in New Zealand.

== International competitions ==
New Zealand toured Great Britain and France. The Kiwis defeated France and Wales but lost the series against Great Britain 1–2. In Bradford, a crowd of 42,680 saw New Zealand play, setting a new record for the team on British soil. New Zealand were coached by Thomas McClymont. The squad included; Warwick Clarke, Ron McGregor, Maurie Robertson, Len Jordan, Jack Forrest, Roy Clark, Rex Cunningham, John Newton, captain Pat Smith, Les Pye, Charlie McBride, Travers Hardwick, Ken Mountford, Clarence Hurndell, Claude Hancox, Abbie Graham, Arthur McInnarney, Doug Anderson, Joffre Johnson, Arthur Gillman, Bob Aynsley, Jimmy Haig, Des Barchard and George Davidson. Arthur McInnarney was the only squad member who had been a part of the 1939 tour. Hurndell returned home from Panama after becoming ill.

During the French leg of the tour captain Pat Smith acted as stand-in coach as MyClymont had an agreement with the NZRL that he would not coach Test teams on Sundays, due to his religious beliefs.

The New South Wales Rugby League's champion Balmain Tigers traveled to Auckland, defeating the Auckland Rugby League's champion Mount Albert Lions 16–11. Balmain lost to Otahuhu and Marist before defeating Otahuhu before losing to Waikato Māori in Huntly.

== National competitions ==
=== Northern Union Cup ===
Wellington held the Northern Union Cup at the end of the season after they had defeated the West Coast 11–4. The West Coast was missing its 1947-48 Kiwi players.

=== Inter-district competition ===
Canterbury defeated the West Coast 10–5 in Greymouth for their first win in ten years. They then lost 8–2 in the return match in Christchurch. During the Kiwis tour, Auckland defeated Canterbury 22–20 at Carlaw Park before drawing 13-all with the West Coast at the same venue. Auckland included Ray Cranch and Roy Nurse while Canterbury included Joe Duke.

== Club competitions ==
=== Auckland ===
Mt Albert won the Auckland Rugby League's Fox Memorial Trophy, Roope Rooster and Stormont Shield. Marist and Richmond shared the Rukutai Shield.

Warwick Clarke and Rex Cunningham played for City, while Des White played his first senior game with the Ponsonby club, who also included Travers Hardwick and Len Jordan. Mount Albert included Roy Nurse, Arthur McInnarney and Ray Cranch while Doug Anderson played for Point Chevalier. The North Shore included Roy Clark and Les Pye, Otahuhu included Joffre Johnson and Claude Hancox and Marist included Des Barchard and George Davidson. Richmond included Clarence Hurndell, Ron McGregor, Maurie Robertson and Abbie Graham.

The Eden Roskill, Wesley and Mt Roskill clubs amalgamated in 1947 to form Mt Roskill.

=== Wellington ===
Marist, Randwick won the Wellington Rugby League's Appleton Shield.

=== Canterbury ===
Sydenham won the Canterbury Rugby League's Massetti Cup.

The Papanui and Prebbleton clubs were founded in 1947.

Jimmy Haig switched from Otago rugby union to join the Prebbleton club, where he was joined by "The Master", Pat Smith, who joined from Addington. Smith would later become an administrator of Marist and Canterbury and coach Papanui.

=== Other Competitions ===
Blackball defeated Sydenham 19–3 to retain the Thacker Shield.
