= 1949 New Zealand rugby league season =

Seasons
- ← 1948 1950 →

The 1949 New Zealand rugby league season was the 42nd season of rugby league that had been played in New Zealand.

== International competitions ==
New Zealand drew a series against Australia, 1-all. New Zealand were coached by Thomas McClymont and included; Warwick Clarke, Dave Redmond, Maurie Robertson, Tommy Baxter, Bill McKenzie, Abbie Graham, Jack Russell-Green, captain Pat Smith, Bob Aynsley, John Newton, Clarence Hurndell, Charlie McBride, Travers Hardwick, Len Jordan, George Davidson and Ron Westerby.

Australia opened the tour with a 33–7 defeat of South Auckland, before a 39–14 win over the West Coast. The South Island then lost 8–38 to Australia at Monica Park. South Island included Bill McKenzie, Len Brown, George Menzies, Jimmy Haig, Pat Smith, Bob Aynsley, John Newton, Lory Blanchard, Charlie McBride and Alister Atkinson.

Australia then defeated Southern Provinces 17-15 before a 33–0 victory over the New Zealand Māori side. Auckland then lost to Australia 18–36 at Carlaw Park. Auckland included Warwick Clarke, Dave Redmond, Tommy Baxter, Maurie Robertson, Doug Anderson, Abbie Graham, Jack Russell-Green, Clarence Hurndell, George Davidson, Bill Spence, Ra Rogers, Graham Burgoyne and Allen Laird. Australia then defeated Northern Provinces 39–9.

An Auckland Colts team also lost to Australia 16–30. Agreed to as the tenth and final match of the tour, the Colts did not have a chance to train together before the match. The Colts included Des White and Ray Cranch.

== National competitions ==
=== Northern Union Cup ===
Wellington again held the Northern Union Cup at the end of the season.

=== Inter-district competition ===
Auckland defeated the West Coast 9–3. Auckland included Maurie Robertson and Tommy Baxter while the West Coast included Frank Mulcare and George Menzies.

Canterbury were coached by Jim Amos and included Joe Duke, Alister Atkinson, Lory Blanchard, Pat Smith, Bill McKenzie, Len Brown and Jimmy Haig.

== Club competitions ==
=== Auckland ===
Richmond won the Auckland Rugby League's Fox Memorial Trophy, Rukutai Shield, Roope Rooster and Stormont Shield. Ellerslie won the Sharman Cup while Ponsonby won the Norton Cup.

Len Jordan came out of retirement to help his Ponsonby club.

Ron McGregor was named the Auckland Rugby League's secretary, replacing Ivan Culpan.

=== Wellington ===
Marist won the Wellington Rugby League's Appleton Shield.

=== Canterbury ===
Prebbleton won the Canterbury Rugby League's Massetti Cup.

=== Other Competitions ===
Runanga defeated Prebbleton 7–3 to win the Thacker Shield.
