= 1946 New Zealand rugby league season =

Seasons
- ← 1945 1947 →

The 1946 New Zealand rugby league season was the 39th season of rugby league that had been played in New Zealand.

== International competitions ==
New Zealand defeated the touring Great Britain side. The New Zealand team was: Warwick Clarke, Roy Nurse, Len Jordan, Maurie Robertson, Bill Mountford, Roy Clark (c), Rex Cunningham, John Newton, Bob Aynsley, Bruce Graham, Arthur Gillman, Charlie McBride and Travers Hardwick.

Great Britain beat South Island 12–24 at the Show Grounds in front of 8,000 fans. The West Coast defeated Great Britain, 17–8, at Victoria Park to inflict their biggest loss of the entire Australasian tour.

Auckland lost to Great Britain twice, 9-7 and 22–9, in front of crowds of 15,000 and 12,000 at Carlaw Park. Auckland included Warwick Clarke, Arthur Read, Trevor Barmley, Frank Collins, Ron McGregor, Roy Nurse, Maurie Robertson, captain Roy Clark, Rex Cunningham, Joffre Johnson, John Rutherford, Bruce Graham, Les Pye, Des Ryan and Travers Hardwick.

The New South Wales Rugby League's champion Balmain Tigers traveled to Auckland, being defeated 17-9 by the Auckland Rugby League's champion Richmond club.

== National competitions ==
=== Northern Union Cup ===
West Coast again held the Northern Union Cup at the end of the season.

=== Inter-island competition ===
The South Island defeated the North Island 25–11 in the annual fixture. The South Island included Ray Nuttall, Ken and Bill Mountford, Jack Forrest, Pat Smith, Bob Aynsley, Len Brown, John Newton, Arthur Gillman, Charlie McBride and Ces Davison.

=== Inter-district competition ===
Auckland toured the South Island, losing to the West Coast 10–7 in Greymouth before defeating Canterbury 51–28 at the Addington Show Grounds. The Auckland team included; Warwick Clarke, Arthur Read, Trevor Bramley, Roy Nurse, Maurie Robertson, Ron McGregor, captain Roy Clark, Abbie Graham, Rex Cunningham, Jim Fogarty, Des Ryan, Joffre Johnson, Don Hardy, Fred James, Les Pye, Clarrie Petersen and Travers Hardwick. Len Jordan and John Rutherford were selected but had to withdraw, being replaced by Bramley and Hardy.

The West Coast included John Newton, Bob Aynsley, Charlie McBride, Arthur Gillman and Ken Mountford.

== Club competitions ==
=== Auckland ===
Richmond won the Auckland Rugby League's Fox Memorial Trophy and Stormont Shield. North Shore won the Rukutai Shield and Marist won the Roope Rooster.

Richmond were coached by Scotty McClymont.

=== Wellington ===
Randwick won the Wellington Rugby League's Appleton Shield.

=== Canterbury ===
Rakaia won the Canterbury Rugby League's Massetti Cup.

The Christchurch club was registered. In 1968 the club was renamed Eastern Suburbs.

=== Other Competitions ===
Blackball defeated Rakaia 29–8 to win the Thacker Shield.
