= 1948 New Zealand rugby league tour of Australia =

- Manager: Vic Simpson; Bill Swift
- Tour captain(s): Patrick Smith
- Top point scorer(s): Warwick Clarke 42
- Top try scorer(s): Dave Redmond 3
- Top test point scorer(s): Warwick Clarke 16
- Top test try scorer(s): Dave Redmond 2
Summary
P	W	D	L
Total
8	6	0	2
Test match
2	1	0	1
Opponent
P	W	D	L
Australia
2	1	0	1

Tour chronology
- Previous tour: 1938 by to 1946 by 1947-48 to
- Next tour: 1949 by to 1950 by 1952 by

The 1948 New Zealand rugby league tour of Australia was the fourteenth tour by New Zealand's national rugby league team, and the eleventh tour to visit Australia. The eight-match tour included two Test Matches, which were the first played by New Zealand in Australia since 1909.
Captained by Pat Smith, the Kiwis returned home having won six and lost two of their games. The team won the first test match of the tour but lost the second.

== Squad ==
Player	Pos.	Age (Note: Age as given in the ‘’Rugby League News’’ for the first match against New South Wales)	Weight	Province	Tests on Tour	Games	Tries	Goals	FG	Points
Doug Anderson	Centre	21	11 st. 8 lb. (73 kg)	Auckland	0	4	1	0	0	3
Bob Aynsley	Hooker	26	13 st. 2 lb. (83 kg)	West Coast	0	3	0	0	0	0
Des Barchard	Halfback	25	12 st. 2 lb. (77 kg)	Auckland	2	5	2	0	0	6
Vic Belsham	Five-eighth	22	10 st. 8 lb. (67 kg)	Auckland	0	4	0	0	0	0
Warwick Clarke	Fullback	28	11 st. 4 lb. (72 kg)	Auckland	2	6	0	21	0	42
Rex Cunningham	Halfback	25	11 st. 5 lb. (72 kg)	Auckland	1	5	1	0	0	3
Joe Duke	Second-row	30	13 st. 6 lb. (85 kg)	Canterbury	0	4	1	0	0	3
Jack Forrest	Wing	24	12 st. 9 lb. (80 kg)	West Coast	2	4	1	0	0	3
Abby Graham	Five-eighth	28	11 st. 2 lb. (71 kg)	Auckland	2	6	2	0	0	6
Albert Hambleton	Prop	23	14 st. 4 lb. (91 kg)	South Auckland	2	5	2	0	0	6
Travers Hardwick	Lock	26	13 st. 2 lb. (83 kg)	Auckland	2	6	0	0	0	0
Sandy Hurndell	Second-row	21	14 st. 10 lb. (93 kg)	Auckland	2	6	1	0	0	3
Joffe Johnson	Prop	30	15 st. 0 lb. (95 kg)	Auckland	0	4	0	0	0	0
Allen Laird	Lock	24	12 st. 8 lb. (80 kg)	Auckland	0	3	2	0	0	6
Charlie McBride	Second-row	23	13 st. 2 lb. (83 kg)	West Coast	2	7	2	0	0	6
Bill McKenzie	Wing	23	12 st. 7 lb. (79 kg)	Canterbury	0	3	0	0	0	0
John Newton	Prop	27	14 st. 12 lb. (94 kg)	West Coast	2	4	1	0	0	3
Dave Redmond	Wing	24	12 st. 4 lb. (78 kg)	Auckland	2	6	3	0	0	9
Maurie Rich	Fullback	23	12 st. 8 lb. (80 kg)	Auckland	0	4	0	8	0	16
Maurie Robertson	Centre	22	11 st. 10 lb. (74 kg)	Auckland	2	6	0	0	0	0
Patrick Smith	Hooker	32	14 st. 10 lb. (93 kg)	Canterbury	2	6	0	0	0	0
Allan Wiles	Centre	27	12 st. 4 lb. (78 kg)	Auckland	1	3	1	0	0	3

Ken Mountford, who was initially selected in the touring party, withdrew due to injury and was replaced by Allen Laird.
The touring squad were the first rugby league team to fly to Australia.
The Rugby League News published pen portraits of the tourists: backs, forwards and the co-managers.

== Tour ==
May 22	New South Wales	23–17	New Zealand	Sydney Cricket Ground
	Tries: 5 Len Smith; Norm Jacobson; Eddie Tracey; Johnny Graves; Les Cowie; Goals: 4 Keith Froome (4)	[Program; Report Report]	Tries: 3 Jack Forrest; Allen Laird; John Newton; Goals: 4 Warwick Clarke (4)	Attendance: 43,505; Referee: George Bishop

Team list:

New South Wales: FB: Noel Pidding (21) ( St George), WG: Norm Jacobson (28) ( Newtown), CE: Len Smith (28) ( Newtown), CE: Eddie Tracey (24) ( Canterbury), WG: Johnny Graves (20) ( South Sydney), FE: Wally O'Connell (25) ( Easts), HB: Keith Froome (26) ( Newtown), LK: Les Cowie (22) ( South Sydney), SR: Fred De Belin (26) ( Balmain), SR: Jack Rayner (26) ( South Sydney), PR: Frank Farrell (30) ( Newtown), HK: Kevin Schubert (20) ( Wollongong), PR: Jack Holland (24) ( St George).
New Zealand FB: Warwick Clarke, WG: Jack Forrest, CE: Allan Wiles, CE: Maurie Robertson, WG: Bill McKenzie, FE: Abby Graham, HB: Rex Cunningham, LK: Allen Laird, SR: John Newton, SR: Charlie McBride, PR: Sandy Hurndell, HK: Patrick Smith, PR: Joffe Johnson.

May 23	Combined Country	16–30	New Zealand	Wollongong Showground
	Tries: 4 Bobby Dimond; Bill Burgess; Johnny Hawke; Ron Rowles; Goals: 2 Fred Chew (2)	[Article; Report; Report Report]	Tries: 6 Albert Hambleton (2); Des Barchard (2); Charlie McBride; Joe Duke; Goals: 6 Maurie Rich (6)	Attendance: 10,000; Gate: AU£ 1,069; Referee: M. Ibbotson

Team list:

NSW Country PR: Ron Mann ( Western Suburbs), HK: Ted Dawson ( Waratah Mayfield), PR: Alf Gibbs ( South Newcastle), SR: Bill Burgess ( Waratah Mayfield), SR: Don Stait ( Portland), LK: Billy Edwards ( Harden), HB: Jim Scoular ( Lakes United), FE: Johnny Hawke ( Canberra), WG: Bobby Dimond ( Dapto), CE: Bill Halvorsen ( Cessnock), CE: Ned Andrews ( South Newcastle), WG: Ron Rowles ( C.B.C.), FB: Fred Chew ( Parkes).
New Zealand FB: Maurie Rich, WG: Dave Redmond, CE: Abby Graham, CE: Maurie Robertson, WG: Doug Anderson, FE: Vic Belsham, HB: Des Barchard, LK: Travers Hardwick, SR: Charlie McBride, SR: Albert Hambleton, PR: Joe Duke, HK: Bob Aynsley, PR: Patrick Smith.

=== 1st Test ===
May 29

Australia	19–21	New Zealand
Tries: 1 Jack Rayner; Goals: 8 Johnny Graves (5); Keith Froome (3)	Program; Report; Database	Tries: 3 Dave Redmond (2); Charlie McBride; Goals: 6 Warwick Clarke (6)

Sydney Cricket Ground
Attendance: 55,866
Referee: T. McMahon Jr.

Team list:

Australia FB: Noel Pidding (age 21) ( St George), WG: Pat McMahon (21) (Toowoomba), CE: Len Smith (28) ( Newtown), CE: Len Pegg (25) ( Souths), WG: Johnny Graves (20) ( South Sydney), FE: Wally O'Connell (25) ( Easts), HB: Keith Froome (26) ( Newtown), LK: Ignatius Tyquin (27) ( Souths), SR: Fred De Belin (26) ( Balmain), SR: Jack Rayner (26) ( South Sydney), PR: Frank Farrell (30) ( Newtown), HK: Kevin Schubert (20) ( Wollongong), PR: Eddie Brosnan (27) ( Brothers).
New Zealand FB: Warwick Clarke, WG: Jack Forrest, CE: Maurie Robertson, CE: Allan Wiles, WG: Dave Redmond, FE: Abby Graham, HB: Des Barchard, LK: Travers Hardwick, SR: Sandy Hurndell, SR: Charlie McBride, PR: Albert Hambleton, HK: Patrick Smith, PR: John Newton.

June 2	Northern NSW	7–13	New Zealand	League Park, Armidale
	Tries: 1 Cec Fitzsimmons; Goals: 2 Bruce Flint (2)	[Teams; Report Report]	Tries: 3 Doug Anderson; Rex Cunningham; Allen Laird; Goals: 2 Maurie Rich (2)	Attendance: 4,000; Referee: H. Morson

Team list:

Northern NSW FB: Bruce Flint ( East Tamworth), WG: Cec Fitzsimmons ( North Tamworth), CE: Trevor Eather ( Boggabri), CE: Phillip Starr ( Guyra), WG: Phil Snell ( West Armidale), FE: T. Curr-Parkes (Barraba), HB: William Bischoff ( West Armidale), LK: Jack Stewart ( Uralla), SR: Cliff McHardie (East Armidale), SR: Cecil Bull ( Guyra), PR: A. Smith ( Boggabri), HK: C. Foxe ( Narrabri), PR: Maurice Dawson ( Glen Innes).
New Zealand FB: Maurie Rich, WG: Bill McKenzie, CE: Maurie Robertson, CE: Doug Anderson, WG: Dave Redmond, FE: Vic Belsham, HB: Rex Cunningham, LK: Allen Laird, SR: Joe Duke, SR: Sandy Hurndell, PR: Albert Hambleton, HK: Patrick Smith, PR: Joffe Johnson.

June 5	Queensland	10–11	New Zealand	Brisbane Cricket Ground
	Tries: 2 Duncan Hall; Ignatius Tyquin; Goals: 2 Dan O'Connor (2)	[Team; Report; Report Report]	Tries: 1 Allan Wiles; Goals: 4 Warwick Clarke (4)	Attendance: 20,812; Gate: AU£ 2,535; Referee: S.W. Chambers

Team list:

Queensland FB: Dan O'Connor (age 30) ( Norths), WG: Pat McMahon (21) (Toowoomba), CE: Harry Linde (24) ( Tivoli), CE: Len Pegg (25) ( Souths), WG: Jack Horrigan ( Valleys), FE: Harry Griffiths (22) ( Booval Swifts), HB: Billy Thompson (24) (Toowoomba), LK: Ignatius Tyquin (27) ( Souths), SR: Duncan Hall (22) ( Valleys), SR: Ron McLennan (23) ( Easts), PR: Kelly Brennan (28) ( West End), HK: Henry Benton (28) ( Centrals), PR: Eddie Brosnan (27) ( Brothers).
New Zealand FB: Warwick Clarke, WG: Jack Forrest, CE: Allan Wiles, CE: Maurie Robertson, WG: Dave Redmond, FE: Abby Graham, HB: Des Barchard, LK: Travers Hardwick, SR: Sandy Hurndell, SR: Charlie McBride, PR: John Newton, HK: Patrick Smith, PR: Albert Hambleton.

June 6	Rockhampton	2–12	New Zealand	Rockhampton Showground
	Tries: 0 Goals: 1 Ken Brighton	[Team; Report Report]	Tries: 2 Abby Graham (2); Goals: 3 Warwick Clarke (3)	Attendance: 3,176; Gate: AU£ 599; Referee: J. Shuttleton

Team list:

Rockhampton FB: R. Graff ( Leichhardts), WG: Ken Brighton ( North Rockhampton), CE: William Cuddy ( Brothers), CE: Des Crow (age 18) ( Brothers), WG: Leo Jeffcoat ( Brothers), FE: P. Carroll ( Leichhardts), HB: Cyril. Connell Jr (age 20) ( Brothers), LK: Norm Dingwall ( Leichhardts), SR: C. Dingwall ( Leichhardts), SR: C. Hunt ( Brothers), PR: Jack Kelly ( Leichhardts), HK: H. Ferricks ( Fitzroys), PR: W. Brighton ( Brothers), Coach: J. Crow.
New Zealand FB: Warwick Clarke, WG: Bill McKenzie, CE: Maurie Rich, CE: Abby Graham, WG: Doug Anderson, FE: Vic Belsham, HB: Rex Cunningham, LK: Allen Laird, SR: Travers Hardwick, SR: Charlie McBride, PR: Joffe Johnson, HK: Bob Aynsley, PR: Joe Duke.

=== 2nd Test ===
June 12

Australia	13–4	New Zealand
Tries: 3 Ignatius Tyquin; Len Pegg; Pat McMahon; Goals: 2 Keith Froome (2)	Report; Report; Database	Tries: 0 Goals: 2 Warwick Clarke (2)

Brisbane Cricket Ground
Attendance: 23,013
Gate: AU£ 3,689
Referee: S. Chambers

Team list:

Australia FB: Clive Churchill (age 21) ( South Sydney), WG: Pat McMahon (20) (Toowoomba), CE: Len Smith (31) ( Newtown), CE: Len Pegg (26) ( Souths) captain-coach, WG: Johnny Graves (20) ( South Sydney), FE: Wally O'Connell (25) ( Easts), HB: Keith Froome (26) ( Newtown), LK: Ignatius Tyquin (29) ( Souths), SR: Fred De Belin (27) ( Balmain), SR: Duncan Hall (22) ( Valleys), PR: Jack Holland (25) ( St George), HK: Kevin Schubert (20) ( Wollongong), PR: Nevyl Hand ( North Sydney).
New Zealand FB: Warwick Clarke, WG: Jack Forrest, CE: Abby Graham, CE: Maurie Robertson, WG: Dave Redmond, FE: Rex Cunningham, HB: Des Barchard, LK: Travers Hardwick, SR: Charlie McBride, SR: Sandy Hurndell, PR: Albert Hambleton, HK: Patrick Smith, PR: John Newton.

June 14	Newcastle	9–10	New Zealand	Newcastle Sports Ground
	Tries: 1 Ned Andrews; Goals: 3 Ron Crossley (3)	[Teams; Report Report]	Tries: 2 Dave Redmond; Sandy Hurndell; Goals: 2 Warwick Clarke (2)	Attendance: 8,000; Gate: AU£ 566; Referee: W. Jackson

Team list:

Newcastle FB: Les Gilbert ( Northern Suburbs), WG: Terry Sullivan ( Western Suburbs), CE: Ron Golden ( Lakes United), CE: Ned Andrews ( South Newcastle), WG: Ron Crossley ( Northern Suburbs), FE: Horry Banks ( Western Suburbs), HB: Len Walton ( South Newcastle), LK: Jack Hutchinson ( Northern Suburbs), SR: Ivor Rees ( Kurri Kurri), SR: William Wylie ( Waratah Mayfield), PR: Alf Gibbs ( South Newcastle), HK: Ted Dawson ( Waratah Mayfield), PR: Gus Briggs ( Central Newcastle).
New Zealand FB: Warwick Clarke, WG: Dave Redmond, CE: Vic Belsham, CE: Doug Anderson, WG: Maurie Rich, FE: Des Barchard, HB: Rex Cunningham, LK: Travers Hardwick, SR: Charlie McBride, SR: Sandy Hurndell, PR: Joffe Johnson, HK: Bob Aynsley, PR: Joe Duke.

== Sources ==
Acronym	Item	Years	Database App	Notes
Direct Online Access
RLN	Rugby League News	1920-1973	Trove	Match Program in Sydney, Team Lists, Team Photos, Articles
RLP	Rugby League Project	1907–present	Website	Test Match teams & scorers.
Sun	The Sun (Sydney)	1910-1954	Trove	Match Reports, Articles.
DT	The Daily Telegraph (Sydney)	1931-1954	Trove	Match Reports, Articles.
CM	The Courier-Mail	1933-1954	Trove	Match Reports, Articles.
-	Various Regional Newspapers	1891-1954	Trove	Match Reports, Given Names of Players
Offline Resources
EECYB	E.E. Christensen's Official Rugby League Year Book	1946-1978	Copies at State Library of NSW	Teams, Point Scorers, Report. 1949 Yearbook covers the 1948 tour.
