= Arthur McInnarney =

New Zealand rugby league player (1918–1986)

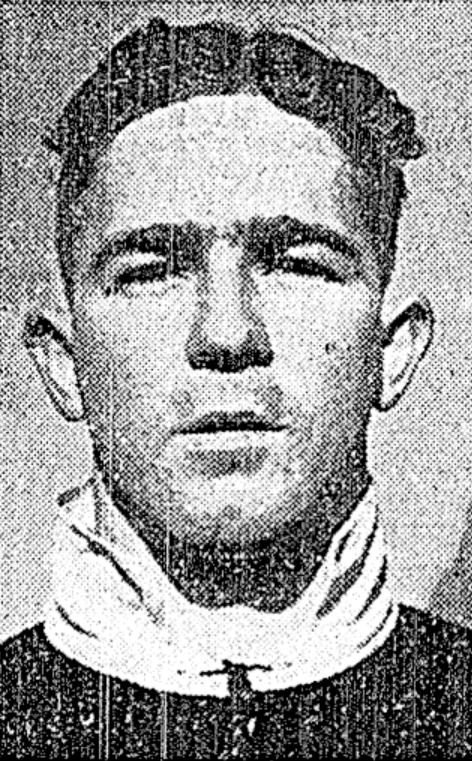

Personal information
- Full name: Arthur James McInnarney
- Born: 12 March 1918 Auckland, New Zealand
- Died: 8 June 1986 (aged 68) Epsom, Auckland, New Zealand

Playing information
- Height: 5 ft 7 in (170 cm)
- Weight: 12 st 6 lb (174 lb; 79 kg)

Rugby league
- Position: Centre, Wing, Stand-off
Club
Years	Team	Pld	T	G	FG	P
1938–48	Mount Albert United	57	25	0	0	75
Representative
Years	Team	Pld	T	G	FG	P
1938–39	Auckland Pākehā	2	1	0	0	3
1939–47	New Zealand Trial	3	1	0	0	3
1939–47	New Zealand	17	4	0	0	12
1947–48	Auckland	5	1	0	0	3
1947	North Island	1	0	0	0	0

Rugby union
Club
Years	Team	Pld	T	G	FG	P
1941	Papakura Army	8	5	0	0	15
Representative
Years	Team	Pld	T	G	FG	P
1941	Waiouru Army North Team	1	1	0	0	3
1942	NZ Army Tank Brigade	2	1	0	0	3
1945	New Zealand Army Trial	1	1	0	0	3
- As of Games for Mt Albert is 1938–45 with following year stats missing

Arthur James McInnarney (12 March 1918 – 8 June 1986) was a rugby league footballer who represented New Zealand in 1939 on their aborted tour of England becoming the 276th player to represent New Zealand. He also went on their 1947/48 tour of England, Wales, and France playing 14 matches. McInnarney also represented Auckland, Auckland Pākehā, North Island, and the Mount Albert club in Auckland. During the war years he played rugby for Papakura Army and was a triallist for the New Zealand Military side near the end of the war before a wound ruled him out.

== Early life ==
Arthur James McInnarney was born in Auckland, New Zealand on 12 March 1918. His parents were John William McInnarney (1886–1970), and Margaret Sarah Wright (1891–1984). He had two older brothers, Kenneth (Ken) John McInnarney (1914–1986), and Raymond (Ray) Frank McInnarney (1916–1992). His father John was the secretary of the Printing Trades Union.

== Sporting career ==
=== Rugby league (Ellerslie) 1929–37 ===
==== 1929–31 ====
Arthur McInnarney began playing football at the Ellerslie Convent School and then played rugby league for Ellerslie United around 1929 for their schoolboys team along with two other McInnarneys, most likely his brothers Raymond and Kenneth. They finished 9th of 11 teams. He then went on to captain the Ellerslie 7th grade side. It was mentioned in a brief article that the family was living on Arthur Street in Ellerslie at the time. At the end of the season either Raymond or Arthur was named in the forwards in a primary school trial match to choose an Auckland team.

Their father John, was the school boys delegate for the Ellerslie club for the 1930 season and spent many future years on the club committee. In late September Arthur was selected by E. Cowley in an Auckland Primary Schools team trial to play at Carlaw Park No. 1 on 27 September at 12:45. He was named in the second row of the A Team. Arthur was mentioned at the end of the year when Ellerslie had a picnic for their junior players at Eastern Bay. His schoolboys side had won the C section of the competition. He won the "egg in the hat" game at the picnic while Kenneth came second in the seventh grade senior running race and first in the steeplechase, and Raymond placed 2nd in the junior team running race.

In 1931 Arthur was named in the Auckland Schoolboys team to play against Ngāruawāhia on 12 September at their opponents ground. In the side was Laurie Mills who would also go on to represent New Zealand, though he was killed in the war effort in December 1941. The team was managed by Lou Rout, Freeman Thompson, and John McInnarney. Then in October, McInnarney was named in a Schoolboys match at Carlaw Park which was a curtain raiser to the touring Eastern Suburbs side who were playing Devonport United on 10 October. The match was played before a crowd of 17,000. He was named in the 'City' side which included players from City, Newton, Devonport, Papatoetoe, Ellerslie, Avondale, and Richmond. While their opponents were named 'Suburbs' and were confusingly made up of players from much the same sides including Newmarket, Avondale, Ellerslie, Richmond, Devonport, Northcote, Newton, and Papatoetoe. McInnarney's City side won 20 to 9.

=== Track Cycling (Papatoetoe Club) ===
==== 1934–1938 ====
Arthur was a particular good track cyclist who rode successfully at a competitive level from 1934 through the rest of the decade. His brother Ken was cycling competitively in 1932 and Ray and Arthur joined him in 1934. At the Ellerslie Amateur Athletic and Cycle Club's meeting at the Ellerslie Reserve on 7 March 1934 all three brothers were competing with Arthur riding in the One Mile Local Novice Handicap off scratch. He was 5 days short of his 16th birthday.

In late October at a Papatoetoe Club event "the three McInnarney brothers dominated both events [half mile and one mile and a half], and all are very fit. The youngest of the trio, A. McInnarney in his first ride, scored a convincing win and showed that he has cycling ability. He followed this up by winning a second event with plenty to spare". He continued to ride in their weekly club events through to the end of the year. In late November "once again the McInnarney's swept the board, scoring as many points as the other placed riders put together". Arthur was third in the half mile race which his brother Ray won, while Arthur came second in the two-mile A grade event behind Ray Beehre. On 15 January at a regular mid week club meeting he came first in the A Grade five mile race in a time of 12m 4s.

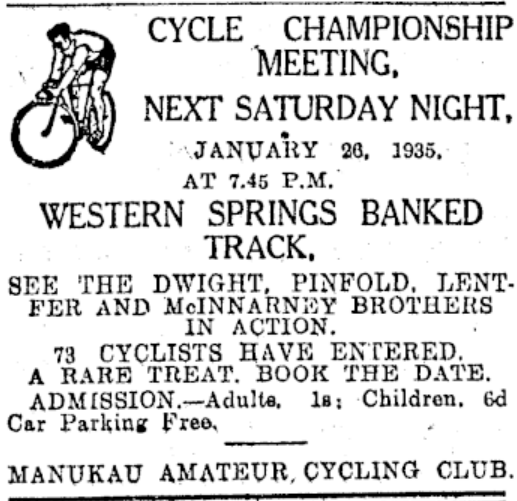
Ad in the New Zealand Herald featuring Ray, Arthur, and Ken McInnarney

Two weeks later an advertisement was placed in the New Zealand Herald for the Manukau Amateur Cycling Club who were having an event at Western Springs Stadium on the concrete banked track. It stated "see the Dwight, Pinfold, Lentfer and McInnarney Brothers In Action". The races took place on 26 January at 7:45pm. Then on 23 February Arthur competed in the Auckland Amateur Cycling Championships at the same venue. He was riding in the junior one mile championship and the Half Mile Open race where he had a 40-yard handicap which was the shortest of all the riders. He then competed in the annual Auckland Cycling Centre championship meeting at Western Springs on 27 February. McInnarney came third in the One Mile Junior Championship behind G.W. Holland, and J.H. Gilbanks and second in the Half Mile Handicap behind J.H. Gilbanks. In mid March at the Papatoetoe meeting McInnarney finished second in his One Mile A Grade heat and then finished second again in the final to Allen.

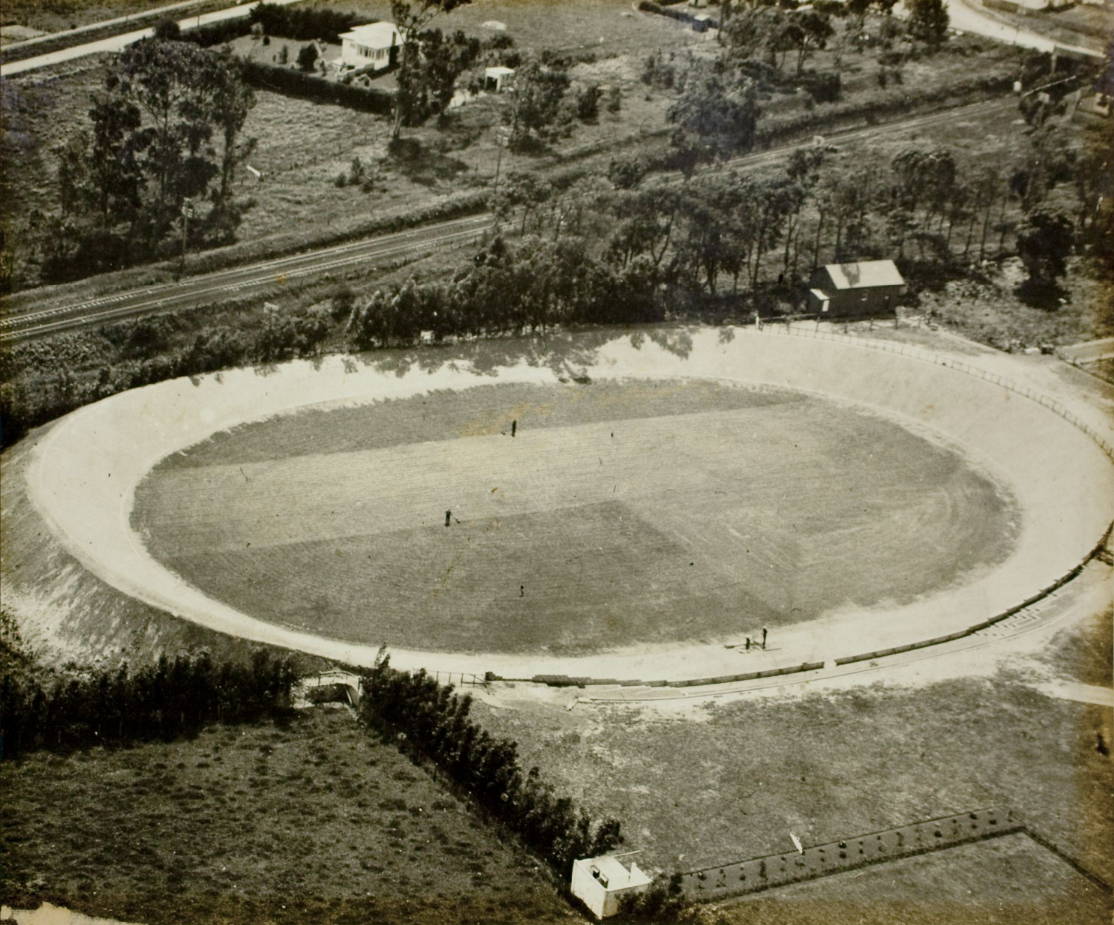
The Papatoetoe Stadium (1932) and cycle track where McInnarney competed throughout the 1930s

On 19 March in the Three Miles A Grade race at Papatoetoe, Arthur was racing off scratch with Roy Taylor, and D. Norm Pinfold, while Ray had a 40-yard handicap and Ken a 170-yard handicap indicating that despite being two and four years younger than them respectively, Arthur was a stronger rider. He placed second behind brother, Ray who had a 40-yard start on him in a field of sixteen riders with Ray finishing in a time of 6m53s. On 8 June he failed to place in the junior 7.5 mile race but rode the fastest time in 19m 20s after racing off scratch, seven seconds faster than the first placed rider who had had a 55-second start. He continued to race through the remainder of winter and then through spring. On 15 October they began their annual Tuesday night races with Arthur and Ray named among others who were "riders likely to be in championship class". He competed through into the new year and on 7 January he came second in the One Mile A Grade final with Ray winning it in a time of 2m 23 2.5s though Arthur had ridden off scratch. And in the Two Miles A Grade final he finished second behind Ray who won in a time of 5m 4 3.5s. A week later the Papatoetoe and Lynndale Clubs continued their weekly meetings with the New Zealand Herald saying "for their combined teamwork and tactics on their home track at Papatoetoe the McInnarney brothers are outstanding and last week A.Gordon Patrick, present Auckland track champion, found them both a difficult problem when, in a desperate sprint, he finished inches back in second place to R. McInnarney, with A. McInnarney an extremely close third". In the Two Mile race Ray, Arthur, and Roy T. Taylor were off scratch and all passed Clarrie W. Allen and finished in that order.

===== Auckland Amateur Cycling Championships (1936) =====
On Monday evening, 17 February the Auckland Centre of the New Zealand Amateur Cycling Association held their annual provincial championship meeting at the Western Springs Stadium banked concrete track. It was thought that the junior un-paced kilometre would be "a close contest between Joe Gillbanks, Charlie Dwight and Arthur McInnarney…". While in the junior tandem paced mile Arthur would be competing for the first time. Before a large crowd in sunny weather though with a "fairly stiff breeze" the racing took place. Arthur finished second in the Three Mile Open Handicap behind O.B. White with Ray in third. Along with star rider, Roy T. Taylor it was said that "there were others, too, to prove that Papatoetoe is not a one man club. Ray McInnarney, Sid Pinfold, Arthur McInnarney, "Bubs" Allan, Owen White, were going well, too. The three mile handicap even went altogether to club men, the McInnarneys filling second and third places to O.B. White. The brothers started from virtual scratch...a good race was brought to a thrilling finish when the back men prevailed in a ding-dong go. White unwound a furious sprint to head Arthur McInnarney, who was a length ahead of brother Ray, who was ambling effortlessly, but was boxed in and though as fresh as a daisy could not get through". The article went on to say "Arthur McInnarney found the track strange and was suffering acutely from mental distress created by so many friends giving him advice. Getting well back from the tandem added to his strain. He was a different boy when competing later in the three-miler. The 60 members of the Papatoetoe Club are still confident of his ability and are staunch on the belief that he is the city's best junior and should be packing for Wanganui as a junior representative". He was still aged just 17, a few weeks away from his 18th birthday. Days later on Saturday, 22 February Arthur competed in the third of a series of scratch race meetings on the Papatoetoe Stadium track at an Auckland Cycling Centre meeting. Before a large crowd he competed in the A Grade races for the Two Laps Sprint, One Mile Race, and Five Miles Points Race. He finished second in the first race heat, third in the following race heat and third in the final, and second in the Five Mile Points Race. Then on the following Tuesday at the Papatoetoe Cub meeting. He was involved in several races and was "first to finish in the three mile and so got points for third place, a position which he also filled in the short race, showing he is outstanding as a junior rider". In late February McInnarney finished second to E.G. Mynott at an Otahuhu Club meeting on the Sturges Park grass track. On 17 March Arthur came second in the One Mile race before attempting to break the A Grade record time when he finished in 18 seconds, just one-fifth of a second outside his brother, Ray's record.

===== 1936/37 Season =====
The season began in October with Arthur continuing to compete in events each week. On Monday, 15 February the Manukau Amateur Cycling Club held its annual championship at Western Springs Stadium. McInnarney competed in the Half-mile (15 yds), One Mile (30 yds), and Miss-and-Out Race. In the One Mile handicap he won the second heat in a time of 2m 2 3.5s, but finished second in the final, a length behind E.G. Mynott. While he failed to place in the other races. Two weeks later on 2 March at the Papatoetoe Club event "Arthur McInnarney, riding from virtual scratch, was outstanding in the handicap races. His sprinting was superb, for he went through the fields in the one lap and half-mile to finish third and first respectively. In the miss-and-out scratch race he was also outstanding, winning comfortably without being extended".

On Saturday afternoon and evening on 6 March the New Zealand amateur cycling championship was held at Western Springs Stadium. McInnarney competed in several of the Open and Handicap Events. He finished 3rd in the first heat of the One Mile Senior Handicap, and 3rd in the final of the Two Mile Senior Handicap. While in the Ten Laps Pacemakers' Points Race he finished in a dead heat for second with C.R. Gooder with 5 points. He competed in further Papateotoe meetings finishing among the places then in their final meeting in early April at Manurewa. The 1936 Half Season winners of points trophies showed Arthur finishing third behind R.T. Taylor (45.5pts), and C. Carter (33pts), with 31 points. He was first in the Two Miles and Over season standings with 20 points, one ahead of Taylor. For the 1937 Half Season he was second in the Under Two Miles with 21 points behind Taylor (27 pts), and second in the Two Miles and Over with 21 points, one behind W. Allan.

When the cycling resumed McInnarney continued to compete regularly at Papatoetoe meetings. On 13 November he ran in the 1000 Metres Time Trial and the 1000 Metre Sprint though his finishing positions must have been outside the placings. At the Papatoetoe Club's meeting during the following week he won the Five Mile A Grade race in a time of 12m 12s. On 27 November the Auckland provincial cycling trials for the British Empire Games were held at Western Springs Stadium at 2pm. McInnarney competed in the 1000 Metres Sprint Race, riding in the sixth heat against M.P. Byrnes. And in the 10 Miles Paced Race He lost to Byrnes who won in a time of 13 2-5s. He however won the second re-selection heat and then beat Crawford in the second quarterfinal in a time of 13 1-5s before being beaten by Gooder in the second semi final after "Gooder held the inside running and was never headed, winning by half a wheel in 13 2-5s". In the third/fourth race McInnarney took the race when he beat Brynes by half a length in a fast time of 13s. He failed to place in the Ten Miles Paced Race. He retired in the later stages as did several other riders perhaps due to his strenuous sprinting in the earlier races.

On the evening of 14 December, McInnarney competed in the first ever meeting of the South Suburban Sports Association which included competitors from the Ellerslie, Otahuhu, Papatoetoe, Manurewa and Papakura clubs. He finished second in the Half-mile and the Three-mile behind New Zealand representative and Papatoetoe club mate Roy Taylor.

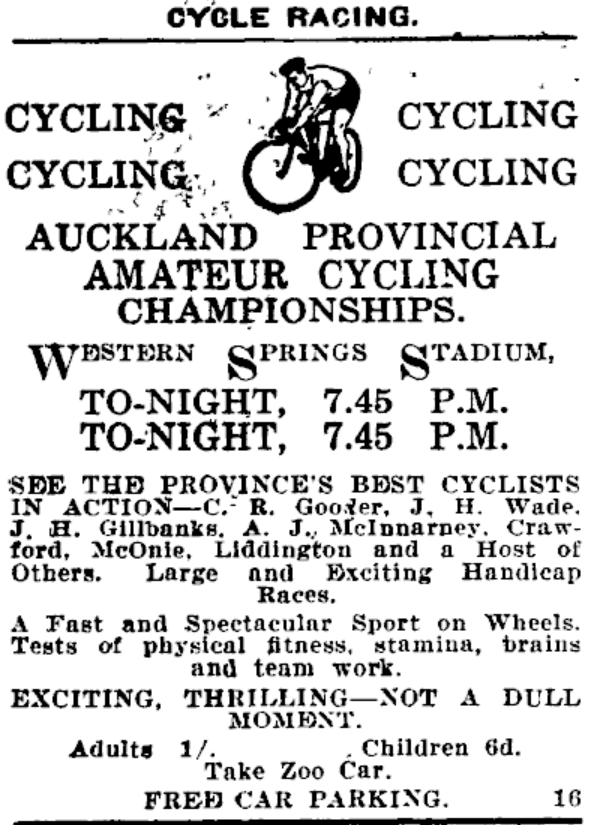
An ad for the Auckland Provincial Cycling Championships featuring Arthur McInnarney's name

He competed in several more events for the Auckland Cycling Centre throughout December, January, and February. On 16 February the provincial championship was held. "Of the younger school J.H. Gillbanks, of the Manukau Club, and A.J. McInnarney, of the Papatoetoe Club, are the leading track exponents. Gillbanks has proved himself the fastest Aucklander over the unpaced kilometre… McInnarney is at a slight disadvantage, for he has not raced very often on the fast concrete track at the Western Springs Stadium. Most of his efforts have been produced on the Papatoetoe track." He was drawn in the fourth heat of five up against S.A. Windsor. An advertisement appeared in the Auckland Star for the event naming McInnarney was one of "the province's best cyclists". In the 100 Metres Sprint, McInnarney lost to R Gooder of the Lynndale club in "a close finish". He then beat J.H. Wade of the Manukau Club in the race off for third in a time of 12 4-5s.

In a Three Miles Scratch Race at the Papatoetoe Club in early March a very strong field competed with three Empire Games representative riders competing along with McInnarney. They were A.G. Patrick, Ronald Stanley Triner, and Roy Taylor. They were all riding off scratch and took off at a fast pace which they couldn't maintain and two back markers caught them and won. Triner was killed in World War 2 on 6 May 1943. In late March the Papatoetoe Club held its annual championship at their local track. Roy Taylor beat McInnarney in two straight heats with his time of 13s for the last 220 yards being "one of the fastest efforts ever seen on the track." While in the Five Miles race McInnarney and J.F. Archer "provided a thrilling finish after riding the thirty laps in 11m 2s.

=== Rugby League ===
==== 1937 Ellerslie 3rd Grade ====
Arthur, now aged 19 played for the Ellerslie United 3rd Grade rugby league team along with older brother Ray. They won the third grade knockout competition when they beat Otahuhu Rovers in the final on 11 September. Although final positions are difficult to know from incomplete results being published they were one of the stronger teams in section 1 and likely finished second there behind Otahuhu who won the championship.

==== 1938 Transfer to Mount Albert ====
The McInnarney brothers dad, John was still the club president for the 1938 season. At the start of the season Arthur transferred to the Mount Albert United (Mt Albert Lions) rugby league club. He made his debut on 30 April against Marist Old Boys (Marist Saints) in their round 4 Fox Memorial Shield match at Carlaw Park on the number 1 field in the 1:30pm kickoff. Mount Albert won 18–13 with McInnarney scoring one of their four tries. The New Zealand Herald wrote that "one of the features of the game was the promise shown by McInnarney at first five eighths for Mount Albert. A recruit from the Ellerslie third grade team, he made a good impression and scored a nice try. He has been tutored by the former international Charles Gregory, and, although only 17 years of age, appears to have a bright future". McInnarney was in fact 19 years of age at this point. His coach at Ellerslie, Charles Gregory had been a New Zealand representative from 1925 to 1930. The Auckland Star said in comments during the week that "the Mount Albert five-eighths did not team too happily, but there was individual merit in the display given by McInnarney, and he cut through brilliantly on one occasion to cross the Marist try-line". At the 4 May Auckland Rugby League control board meeting McInnarney's transfer from Ellerslie to Mount Albert was approved.

His next game was against Manukau on 7 May. They lost 17–9 though with "McInnarney and Reece Marshall in the five eighths line there was far more thrust on attack than has been the case in previous weeks". McInnarney "again showed to advantage at first five eighths and had a good partner in Marshall". Mount Albert had a bye in the following round and on the Monday the North Island side was named for the inter-island match with a Probables v Possibles curtain raiser to help the New Zealand choose their side. Despite only having just begun his first grade career McInnarney was named in the reserves for the curtain-raiser teams. It seems he was not required to take the field in the match. In comments before Mount Albert's round 7 match it was said that "the includion of McInnarney and Marshall has given the inside combination much more speed and thrust…". Mount Albert lost 27–9 with "McInnarney, first five eighths, spoiled some good play by attempting too much alone, and he was often caught in possession". Against City Rovers a week later he scored three tries in a 29–10 win on Carlaw Park 2. Both the "five eighths, Pitt and McInnarney, played a splendid games, especially the later, whose opportunism was rewarded with three tries". His first try came after Martin Hansen "broke away, and from a good passing bout the ball was kicked and McInnarney touched down for a try".

===== Representative debut, Auckland Pākehā =====
McInnarney's good form saw him selected for the Auckland Pākehā team to play Auckland Māori at Carlaw Park on Monday, 6 June. He was picked in the five eighths with Bob Banham and Phil Donovan with one to be omitted. The opposing five eighths were Ted Brimble and Noel Bickerton. The Auckland Māori side won 26 to 21. For the Pākehā side "Banham and McInnarney showed glimpses of their best form at five eighths". Returning to his Mount Albert side he scored a try in a 27–0 win on 11 June. His try came early in the second half when he "dodged his way right through the defence to score". However he "was inclined to attempt too much on his own". After their 10–8 win over Ponsonby United similar comments were made in the New Zealand Herald. He was "too selfish at second five eighths, and was frequently caught in possession".

In round 11 Mt Albert beat Newton 18–13 with McInnarney making "some nice openings at centre three-quarter, but was inclined to hold possession too long. Quicker passes would have resulted in a try by List on once occasion and again when Wilson gave splendid support." The following week Arthur's brother Ray was also listed in the senior squad for their match with North Shore Albions in the main match at Carlaw Park. Ray made his debut on the wing and "was impressive and made the most of his chances". He had also transferred from Ellerslie and it was approved the following week. Mount Albert won the game 9–3 and early in the second half Arthur failed to force the ball down and George Zane-Zaninovich came through to score North Shore's only try. Later in the half Arthur "made a nice opening and Marshall improved the position". In the second half the backline was rearranged with Arthur playing centre three-quarter and this had much to do with their improved football. He "made several nice openings and often penetrated the defence with straight running. It was only the splendid tackling of Verdun Scott that stopped his opponent on several occasions". In their next game, a 14–8 loss to Marist Old Boys, Ray collided with teammate A. MacLachlan when they were trying to field a kick which led to a Marist try. As a result of the collision Ray had to leave the field with an injured leg. Arthur was criticised yet again for being "too selfish" and he "spoiled some movements through being caught in possession" in the centre three quarter position. Arthur played again in their 11–3 win over Richmond in round 14 with Ray being named in the reserve grade side.

Mount Albert then had a bye and the side travelled to Rotorua to play against Bay of Plenty on 30 July. Mount Albert won the match 29–9. McInnarney was named to play on the wing. For Mount Albert "McNeil, McInnarney, and H McLaughlin were the best backs". The Mount Albert team was being coached by former New Zealand international Stan Prentice and he came out of retirement to take part in the match.

After returning to Auckland it is unclear if McInnarney played for the Mt Albert senior side for some time. He was named in the squad to play for games against Manukau, City, Papakura, City again, and then Marist on 10 September. Roy Hardgrave had returned from playing professionally in England and he began playing in the three quarters for Mt Albert. McInnarney was not mentioned in any match reports but may have taken part in some or all of the five games. He definitely played in Mt Albert's final game of the season which was a 26–17 loss in round 2 of the Phelan Shield knockout competition on 17 September. He played a good game among the backs.

=== Cycling ===
==== 1938–1939 Season ====
With the rugby league season at an end McInnarney resumed competitive cycling. He competed at his Papatoetoe Amateur Athletic and Cycle Club's meeting on the evening of 18 October. He rode in the One Mile and Three Mile races. On 15 November at a Papatoetoe Club meeting he came second in his one-mile heat and then third in the final behind Roy Taylor and Renwick. He was also third in the Four Miles A Grade race. The Auckland Star mentioned that Taylor was in brilliant form and that "J.F. Archer and A.J. McInnarney were also riding strongly at the meeting". On the evening of 7 February the Papatoetoe Club staged its annual open Passenger Transport Cup meeting before a large attendance. McInnarney was said to have been prominent. He finished first in the Half-mile in a time of 60 4-5s, and second in the Three Miles behind M. Green. In a promotion for the Lynndale and Northern Amateur Cycle Club's carnival at Western Springs on 23 February, McInnarney's name appeared. Then days later on Saturday he rode in the Manukau Club races at Western Springs. He won the Eight-lap Points Race with 10 points ahead of J.F. Archer, and Roy Taylor in a time of 6.14. While in the Ten Minutes Pursuit Race he rode with clubmates Archer, M.J. Green, and W. Renwick and they came first.

On the evening of 4 March the Auckland Provincial Amateur Cycle Championships were held at Western Springs. McInnarney finished 1st in his heat of the 500 Metres Sprint in 14 1-5s. He then beat C.R. Gooder in the quarterfinals in 14s, before beating J.H. Gillbanks in two straight heats for the semi final. This meant he was up against Roy Taylor in the final and he was well beaten in the first heat of the final before losing the second also, though this time by "less than a wheel". He won the Senior Miss and Out Race in a time of 2.47 3-5s, ahead of W.A. Renwick. His Papatoetoe Club team of Renwick, Archer, and A.J. Green won the Team Race in 2.31. McInnarney also won the Ten Laps Pacemakers Points Race though it was a tie for first with he and Renwick equal on 30 points. Of the 500 Metre results it was said that the "number one shock came in the first quarterfinal when Arthur McInnarney excited the crowd by beating Gooder by three lengths. Then in the semi finals, this year decided by best of two out of three matches, McInnarney gave further astonishment by defeating Joe Gillbanks in two straight heats".

In early April the Papatoetoe had their club championship meeting with McInnarney and Taylor having "keen duels in the sprinting events, with the luck of the running, prior to the 220 mark, against McInnarney. He won the first race with Taylor, and was beaten in the next two, but was unlucky to go off the sealed track on to the grass in the second. The single win that McInnarney registered against Taylor was the first time Taylor had been outsprinted for three years and McInnarney "received a great ovation". It was end of the track cycling season for McInnarney, and both he and Taylor did not compete in the winter cycling season as they both focussed on their rugby league playing.

=== Rugby League ===
==== Mt Albert, New Zealand selection (1939) ====
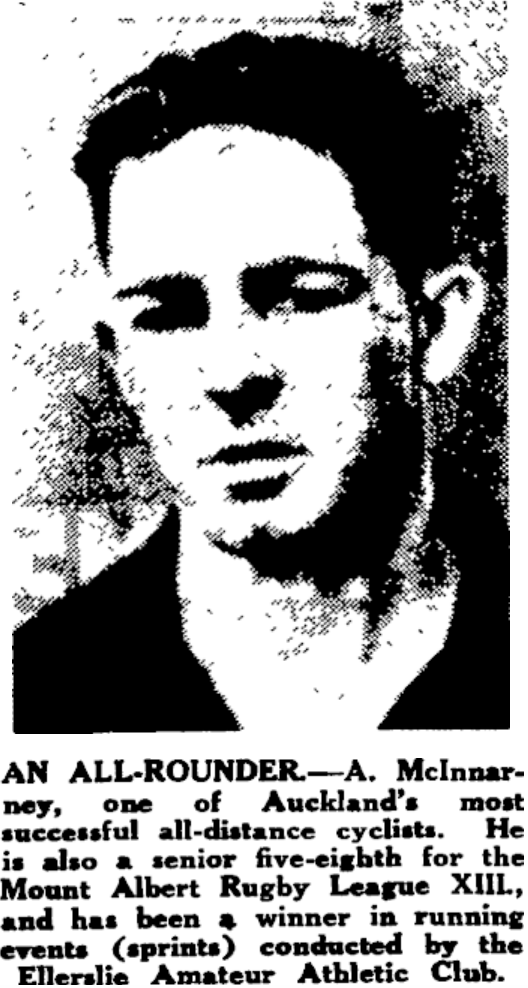

McInnarney resumed his rugby league career in Mt Albert's opening round Fox Memorial Shield match on 1 April against Papakura at Carlaw Park. They won 24–10 with McInnarney scoring a try.

Robert Marshall, the Auckland cricket team wicketkeeper was playing at centre and in similar criticisms to 1938 Marshall was "hampered on occasions by McInnarney holding on to the ball. The latter spoiled a good display by this tendency". The following week he was named in the five eighths once more alongside Bob Banham, the former South Sydney player who had spent 1938 in New Zealand as player coach for North Shore and City. The Mt Albert club had paid for him to return from Australia to join their club in the same roll for the 1939 season. Their opponent was a Sydney XIII who was playing four matches in Auckland against club opponents. The team was mostly made up of Eastern Suburbs players but with additions from several other clubs. Mt Albert won the game 16–11 but ultimately McInnarney did not play as the selectors preferred Bruce Donaldson in the five eighths.

He next played in round 2 in Mt Albert's 11–9 victory over Newton. MacLachlan was their best back with McInnarney and Roy Hardgrave "in individual play [being] the pick of the other backs". In a 9–0 win over Richmond he played on the wing. Neither he not Hardgrave on the other wing had many chances but "played well individually". The New Zealand Herald said that McInnarney "is a neat and dashing type". They then beat Manukau 38–15 in the feature match at Carlaw Park on 6 May with McInnarney scoring one of their nine tries. On the wing he "again showed plenty of determination and is an improving player". He scored again in a 20–13 win against Marist the following week in round 6. They then had their first loss of the season when they went down to North Shore 15–12 on 20 May.

In round 8 Mt Albert beat City 18–7 with McInnarney "making spectacular runs" along with Hardgrave. Following the game he was named on the wing in the Auckland Pākehā team to play Auckland Māori on 5 June. The Auckland Star in comments on the selection wrote "Auckland football at the moment is lacking in the strong running, heavy type of wing three-quarters, but in McInnarney and Nurse there are a pair of colts who anticipate well, handle cleanly and show pace". The Herald said "both players rose from junior ranks two years ago, and their form this season has been very impressive… McInnarney is a very clever attacking back, most of his experience being gained at five eighths. However the experiment of playing him on the wing is a good one". One more round of the Fox Memorial competition was played with Mt Albert easily beating Ponsonby by 42 points to 13 on 3 June. McInnarney scored one of their nine tries with he and Hardgrave on the other wing playing "brilliantly".

==== Auckland Pākehā ====
In the match between Auckland Pākehā and Auckland Māori, which was played on the Monday the Māori side won 19–15. In the second half with the score 14–2 to the winners, McInnarney who was playing in the wing looked certain to score but was tackled by George Nēpia, the former All Black who was now playing for the Manukau club in Auckland. After the Pākehā side scored two tries the score was narrowed to 14–12, and then Arthur Kay and Brian Riley "paved the way for a good try by McInnarney, which placed Auckland one point in the lead". The Māori side finished the stronger though and won the game. In comments on the game it was said that Tommy Chase in the Māori side "outstarred the others, although Nurse and McInnarney showed flashes of brilliance".

Returning to Mt Albert he scored another try in a surprise 13–13 draw with the struggling Papakura side in a match played at Prince Edward Park in Papakura. It was his try which equalised the scores late in the match following "a nice passing rush" from a scrum on their own line. Mt Albert lost to Newton 21–7 on 17 June, before a bye in round 11. Their next match saw McInnarney in the reserves for the match with Richmond on 1 July. However their fullback McLaughlin was injured early and McInnarney came on to replace him but moved into the centre three quarter position. The changes didn't affect them much and they went on to win 11–6.

==== New Zealand Trials, Selection and Tour ====
With the New Zealand team due to tour England the selectors chose the North Island and South Island teams for the inter-island fixture and also trial sides between North Island Probable and North Island Possible teams. The selectors were Thomas (Scotty) McClymont, Hec Brisbane, and Gordon Hooker. McInnarney was named in the reserves for the match to be used in either side. The match was played on 8 July at Carlaw Park with the Probables winning 31–17. McInnarney came on to start the second half, replacing Brian Riley on the right wing. After a counterattack by his Mt Albert teammate Cameron brought play back for the Possibles side McInnarney was "well collared by Tommy Chase". After the games teams were named to play in a second trial match on the Tuesday. Once again McInnarney was named in the reserves. It appears that McInnarney came on early when centre Cooper of Wellington was injured. McInnarney and Robert Marshall "were both sound and enterprising" in the three quarters for the Probables side which won 27–18. McInnarney scored a try for the winners.

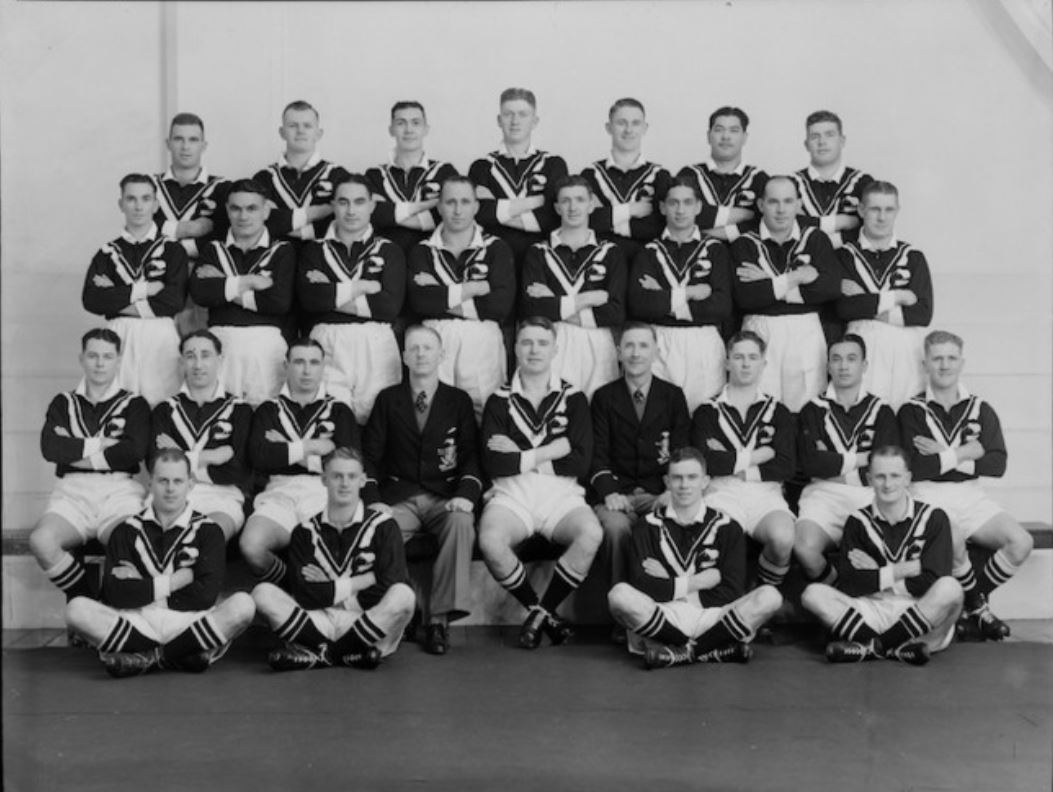
The New Zealand team to tour England in 1939–1940

Following the game the New Zealand team was named for the England tour. McInnarney was named as one of four wingers selected along with ... Laurie Mills, and Jack Campbell. It was said that "good displays in the [second] trial match yesterday won places in the three-quarter line for Tommy Chase and A. McInnarney…", "McInnarney is perhaps the surprise selection of the side, but he has youth and ability, and may develop into an outstanding player". The New Zealand Herald was more critical of his selection writing "among the threequarters chosen yesterday McInnarney, Mount Albert, is a surprise inclusion. His form in the trial games was not impressive… N. Kiely, West Coast, or B. Riley, Auckland would have been preferable…". On the following Saturday he played for Mt Albert in a 21–19 win over Manukau but was said to have been "disappointing … on the wing".

On 18 July, McInnarney's workmates at the Auckland Star "gathered in the "Star" social room during the lunch hour... to congratulate him on his selection as a member of the New Zealand rugby league team which leaves for England on July 27, and to make two presentations". Mr. E. Aldridge, on behalf of the employees of New Zealand Newspapers, presented him "with a complete outfit for evening wear, and in doing so said that his fellow workers felt proud of him, seeing that he was the first footballer of the staff ever to be chosen as an overseas representative. The best wished of all would be with him on the tour". He was also presented with a dressing case on behalf of their Social Club by Mr. W. Groves. On the same day a short piece appeared in the Auckland Star saying "all cycling enthusiasts in Auckland were pleased at the announcement of A.J. McInnarney's selection as a member of the New Zealand rugby league team for England. McInnarney is one of the foremost track riders in Auckland, and ran R. Taylor to excitingly close finishes for the sprint championship of the Papatoetoe Club last summer, tied with Green in the unpaced event, and was third to Archer in the five miler".

On Saturday, 22 July a parade of junior players in honour of the Auckland players chosen for the tour was held at Carlaw Park. The programme included short speeches and "the presentation of gifts from the Schoolboys' Association to two members of the New Zealand team, A.J. McInnarney and L.G. Mills, the first products of Auckland Rugby League school grades to earn national honours with a team going overseas". Then on 24 July a farewell dance was held at the Peter Pan Cabaret in Auckland for the team and they were presented with their ties.

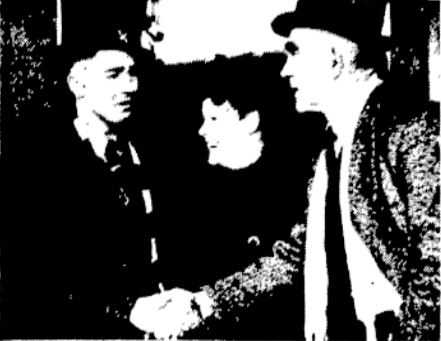
Arthur shaking hands with his father, John, before departing Auckland for Wellington with the New Zealand team

On 26 July the Auckland members were farewelled at Auckland Train Station by family and supporters as they departed for Wellington. Amongst several photographs to be published one showed McInnarney shaking hands with his father, John McInnarney.

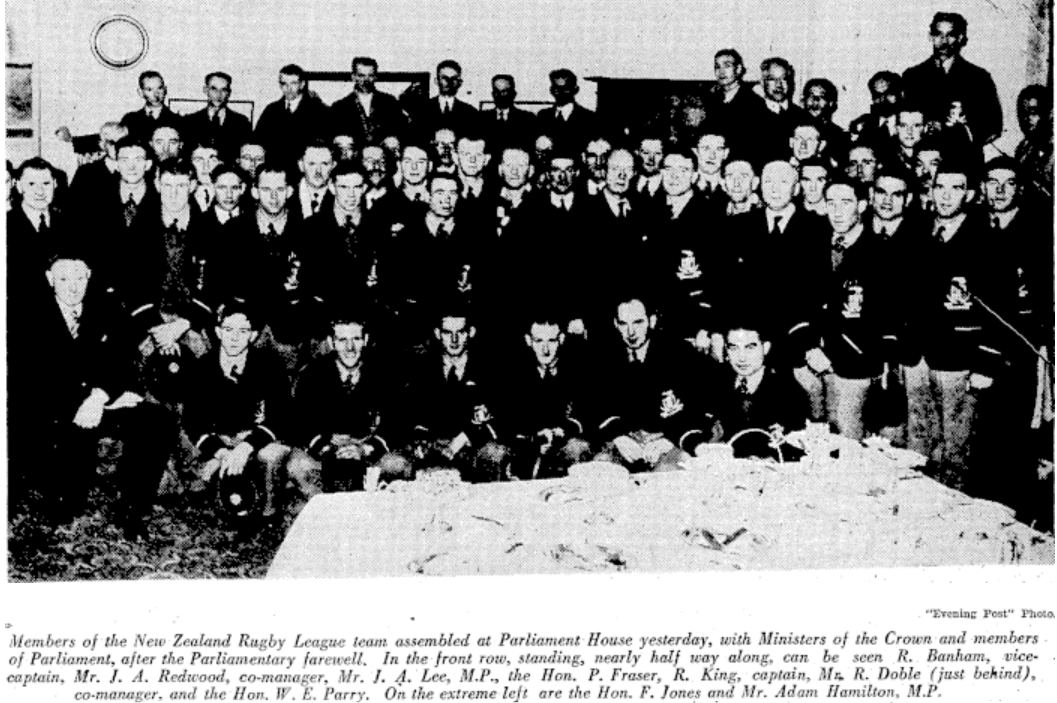
The New Zealand team at a farewell function held in the Parliament Buildings

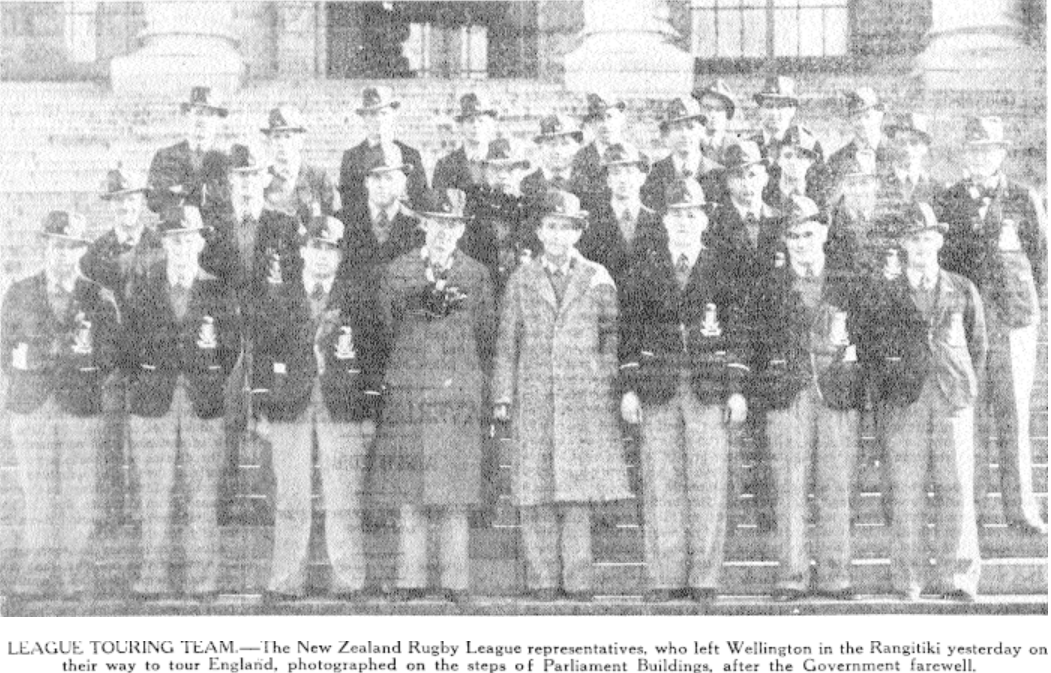
The New Zealand side on the steps of Parliament following their farewell function

On the morning of the 27th the team and management attended a morning tea in the Parliament Buildings with "good wishes extended to the Kiwis, by Deputy-Prime Minister, the Hon. P, Fraser, who expressed hope that they would have a successful tour".

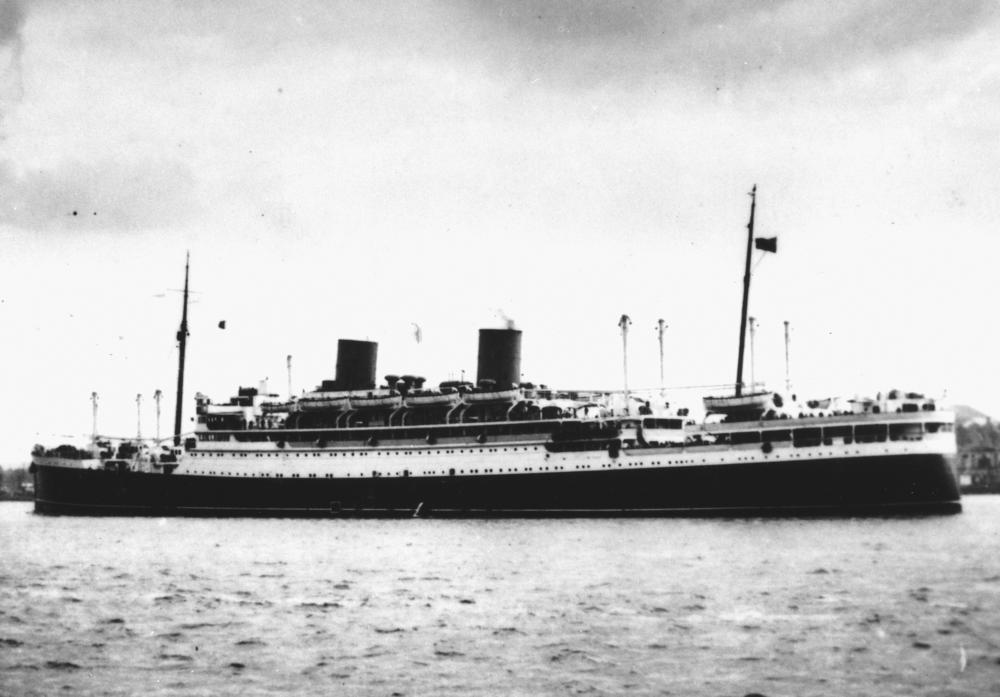
StateLibQld 1 170635 Rangitiki (ship)

The team departed Wellington for London on board the RMS Rangitiki in Tourist Class on Friday 28 July.

It was intended for the tour to consist of 23 matches in England including three tests and then six or seven matches in France however the tour was to be cut very short due the outbreak of World War 2. The first match of the tour was against St Helens on 2 September with Jack Campbell and Laurie Mills named as the wingers. New Zealand won 19 points to 3 at Knowsley Road before 4,000 spectators. A day later, on 3 September Britain declared war on Germany which effectively ended the tour. The second match against Hull Kingston Rovers scheduled for 7 September was cancelled as arrangements were hurriedly made to get the New Zealand side home.

In a letter from managers Jack Redwood and R. Doble they said after war broke out the team had to stay at Beechwood House, Harrogate in the north of England "under the insistence of the English authorities. The players went on A.R.P. (Air Raid Precaution) work, filling and stacking sandbags, and had agreed to keep together under the circumstances". The team was said to have "experienced one air-raid scare at Harrogate" in Yorkshire. They later moved to a different city and the letter concluded "we hope to see you soon. The boys are disappointed at the turn in events, but are happy and well". The team managed to organise to play Dewsbury on 9 September just prior to their departure. The wingers for this match were Jack Smith and Tommy Chase. The tourists won 22–10 at Crown Flatt (Dewsbury) before a crowd of 6,200. The team then returned to New Zealand on board the same liner which took them to England, the RMS Rangitiki.

After his return the Mount Albert club celebrated their championship success. On 26 October a dinner was held for the returning players from the tour, arranged by the Auckland Rugby League ladies' committee. It took place at the Station Hotel.

=== Athletics (1939–1940) ===
==== Running ====
On Monday, 4 December McInnarney competed in the Ellerslie Amateur Athletic Clubs races on the Ellerslie Domain. It was said "A.J. McInnarney, the well known New Zealand league footballer and champion cyclist, continues to show improvement and finished a very good second in the 220 yards. He is an acquisition to the already powerful sprint combination". His brother Ray had also joined the club. Arthur finished second in the Senior 220 Yards handicap behind L Osmond. Then on 9 December he competed at the Mount Albert Amateur Athletic Club's open carnival, held at Gribblehirst Park in Sandringham. McInnarney ran in the 110 yard, 220 yard, and 440 yard races. On 14 December he competed for the Ellerslie Club at the South Suburban championship meeting at Ōtāhuhu. He also ran in the Auckland Star Sports and Social Club's annual picnic on Motuihe Island on 18 February with 400 people in attendance. He was second in the 100 yards race and second in the Apprentices' handicap and was in the winning relay team. The last mention of his running in the summer season was in early March for his Ellerslie Club in the final meeting of the inter-club amateur athletic scratch races under the control of the South Suburban Association at the Ellerslie Domain. He won the C Grade 100 yard sprint in a time of 11 1-5s. He finished second in the 440 yard race also in C Grade.

=== Rugby League (1940) ===
==== Mt Albert ====
The 1940 season saw McInnarney only playing for his Mt Albert club. He was named in the reserves for Auckland Pākehā but was not required to play. His first game of the season was on 6 April in a preliminary round match. With many players away serving in World War 2 the Auckland Rugby League often started seasons with these rounds to assess the strength of the senior sides. Mt Albert beat Newton 23–9 with McInnarney scoring one try. In the second preliminary game on 13 April against Manukau, McInnarney was said to be "an improved player and only has to be more certain of his handling to prove a successful five eighths". For their first championship game against North Shore, McInnarney was listed on the wing though it is unknown where he played in the game which they lost 16–10. In round 2 Mt Albert lost to Manukau 23–7, though he "was the pick of the three-quarters and whenever the ball came his way was dangerous". At this stage of the season a delegation from the Ellerslie United club went to the Auckland Rugby League bord of control meeting to appeal for a senior match to be played at Ellerslie later in the season. Arthur's father, John, led the delegation. With the proceeds to go to the St John Ambulance Association the board agreed to arrange a fixture. It appears he did not play at all in the next match with City on 4 May as he was not named in either the senior side or reserves likely due to injury or unavailability.

Mt Albert had their first win of the championship in round 5 with McInnarney scoring a try in the 19–8 win against Marist before a crowd of 4,000 at Carlaw Park #1. Mt Albert lost to Newton 8–6 on 25 May in a special game to raise money for the Sick and Wounded Soldiers' Campaign at Carlaw Park which doubled as their round 6 match with 6,000 in attendance. The New Zealand Herald wrote that "McInnarney invariably got his man on defence and made the most of the few attacking opportunities he received".

He was named in the reserves for the Auckland Pākehā team to play Auckland Māori on 8 June but was not required to play. The backline selected was a strong one with Laurie Mills and Roy Nurse on the wings and Arthur Kay and Bob Banham in the five eighths. Mt Albert's round 7 game was on 15 June following the representative match the previous weekend. They beat Richmond 24–11 before a good crowd of 7,000 with McInnarney scoring two of their six tries. He played on the wing and "played a good game". He was on the wing again in a 27–19 win over Ponsonby on 22 June.

On 29 June McInnarney played at his old club's ground at the Ellerslie Domain. It was the match organised by his father and the Ellerslie United club committee earlier in the season. Mt Albert played Papakura and beat them 21–14 with McInnarney scoring two tries. The New Zealand Herald wrote that "a good display by McInnarney on the wing was a feature of the game. One of his tries was a brilliant effort". He then played in a 17–7 win over North Shore in round 10 at Carlaw Park. They won their fifth straight game when they beat Manukau 19–5 in round 11 with Colin Cowley, "in the centre, and McInnarney, on the wing [being] fine attacking players". Mt Albert had another win, 24–7 over City on Carlaw Park #2 the following week with McInnarney scoring one of their six tries. He "did well on the wing, in spite of limited opportunities". On 3 August the "principal match" was between Mt Albert and Marist with the Auckland Star writing in a preview that "Mount Albert has virile forwards, and with the backs of the calibre of Clement, Banham, Cowley and McInnarney". Mt Albert suffered their first defeat in over two months when they lost 17–16 with McInnarney scoring another try. They beat Newton a week later 13–2 before suffering a crucial 13–3 loss to Ponsonby with "McInnarney and [Basil] Cranch … strong running three-quarters". Mt Abert then played on their home ground at Fowlds Park, Morningside in the penultimate round of the championship. They won easily 48–22 though with like many games on suburban grounds there weren't many details and little scoring was provided so it is unknown if McInnarney scored any of their many tries.

The Auckland Pākehā team was then named to play Auckland Māori on 31 August. McInnarney was named in the reserves once again. The preferred wingers were Jack Smith and Abbie Graham. Fullback, Verdun Scott was then unable to play but rather than including McInnarney and reshuffling the backline the selectors named Claude Dempsey to join the side and play fullback. The Pākehā side won easily 27–6. The Auckland Star said "Claude Dempsey, the Newton fullback gave a polished display, and was well worthy of selection. He justified his inclusion, but the reserve backs of the Auckland team were McInnarney and Cowley, of the Mount Albert Club. McInnarney reached New Zealand honours last season, and now when he is playing better and a much more experienced player it is his lot to be left on the sideline".

On 7 September Mt Albert played Richmond who had won the championship in round 18 in order to assist with finding the runner up. Mt Albert was two points behind North Shore and after beating Richmond 25–21 it forced the Auckland Rugby League into playing the round 18 fixture between North Shore and Newton two weeks later. North Shore won to push Mt Albert down to 3rd place for the season. McInnarney scored one of Mt Albert's tries in their win. On 14 September Mt Albert began the Roope Rooster knockout competition with a 23–14 win against North Shore. McInnarney scored yet another try and "played splendidly on the wing". His final game of the year came the following week in a 41–13 loss to Ponsonby in the semi final of the knockout competition. Mt Albert were relegated to the consolation Phelan Shield knockout competition and played two games against North Shore in round 3, and Manukau in the final on 12 October but McInnarney was not listed in either lineup. Manukau won 20 to 14 and the Auckland Star noted that "the absence of Banham, McInnarney, and Cowley weighed heavily with Mount Albert … Banham, who was the team's key player, has gone back to Australia, and neither of the other pair, two of the most brilliant league backs, was available". On 4 December, McInnarney's name appeared in the Auckland Star as being among 2186 men drawn in the first ballot for service overseas in World War 2.

=== Rugby League and Rugby Union (1941) ===
The 1941 season saw McInnarney play eight games for Mt Albert before he moved into camp to prepare for his military service. While there he played eight games for the Papakura Army rugby union side in the Auckland club competition and also at least one match for a Waiouru Army rugby team before departing for Europe. His first game of the season was in a preliminary round 2 game on 26 April against City which was drawn 5–5. He scored their only try which was described as "nice", and "from a fine passing movement". They lost their first Fox Memorial Shield championship game on 3 May against Marist by 20–18. There were "two fine movement in which Cowley, McInnarney and B. Cranch were prominent gave Mount Albert three successive tries". While overall "among the Mount Albert backs McInnarney stood out as the best back on the ground and was responsible for three tries".

In round 2 Mt Albert lost 29–15 to City on Carlaw #1 in the early kick off. He scored two of their three tries. His first try came late in the first half after Les Clement passed to Tommy Hetherington who gave an in-pass to McInnarney which sent him "in for a good try". He and Cowley "displaying speed and sharp thrust". In the "final stage of the match McInnarney made a brilliant run to score". The Auckland Star wrote a short piece on McInnarney saying that in an effort to add thrust to their side Mt Albert "is now playing McInnarney in the five eighth line". And he "quickly seized chances in the match against City on Saturday". The New Zealand Herald said that "McInnarney and Cowley missed chances as the result of bad passes" in the first half. Their backs did better in the second half and he and Cowley "were the best of the backs". In round 3 they narrowly beat Papakura 11–10 with McInnarney scoring a try. Early in the game "bright play followed a nice run by McInnarney and Cowley sparkled as he raced for the goal line, only to be well tackled by Seymour". In the second half Mt Albert attacked several times and "Brady and McInnarney were associated in a nice passing bout which had Papakura up against it". His try came late in the match with Mt Albert trailing 10–8 and won them the game. When they attacked from a loose ruck he "received from Clements and beat the defence with a brilliant run to score near the posts". The Herald wrote that "honours in the game went to McInnarney, the Mount Albert five eighths, who scored the winning try. He cut the defence to ribbons in a splendid swerving run after Clement had made a nice opening". The following week Mt Albert lost to Ponsonby 11–3. Early in the game it was said that "Clement sending the ball away sharply from the base of the scrum, and McInnarney penetrating sharply in the five eighths line marked the open phase of the game…". Later in the half Carr (Ponsonby) "was sailing for the Mt Albert line, when McInnarney got across and saved in a daring diving tackle".

Against Newton in a 12–11 win Clement got the backs going and "McInnarney made a good opening, passed to Cowley who scored near the posts". The Star wrote "for the winners, McInnarney, at five eighths, played a fine game and made several nice openings which produced tries". They then beat Richmond 13–8. Once again he was involved in much of the attacking play and in the first half he intercepted "and raced to the Richmond twenty-five where he sent it on to Cowley and the centre raced into a perfect scoring position".

It was reported during the following week that he was required to enter military camp at the end of the following week to train with the New Zealand Expeditionary Force. He was going to the army camp at Papakura and had to parade on Saturday, 5 July at 7 a.m. at the drill hall in Rutland Street. He was to play one more match for Mt Albert this season. In a preview of the game, which was against Manukau on 28 June the Star wrote "Clement has been playing well at half-back, and the inside backs include two very speedy and talented players in McInnarney and Cowley". Mt Albert lost the match which was the feature game at Carlaw Park by 14 points to 5. In the first half the "Mount Albert backs were countering with great speed and dash, with McInnarney and Cowley standing out". He was involved in a back move where he showed "speed and thrust" before Bert Leatherbarrow and Jack Tristram joined in but Moore crossed the line and lost the ball. He was named in the reserves for the Auckland to play South Auckland (Waikato) on 12 July. However he was going off to camp at Papakura on 5 July so was unable to play for Mt Albert or for Auckland. The Star wrote "McInnarney was regarded as a promising wing with youth on his side, and there was general satisfaction when he won Dominion honours. He has made steady improvement since then in his all-round play. Since the team was selected, however, both [Verdun] Scott and McInnarney have gone to camp, the former to Trentham and McInnarney to Papakura".

==== Papakura Army rugby team ====
During the war years the Auckland Rugby Union allowed military based sides to play in their senior competition due to the number of players who had been called into service. The Auckland Rugby League had denied a request for the same to occur in their competition arguing that it would weaken the club sides too much. While in camp McInnarney immediately was selected for the Papakura Army team to play in the Gallaher Shield on 12 July. They played Otahuhu and won 14–5 at Sturges Park, Otahuhu. In the second half "a clever piece of passing by Army's backs enabled McInnarney to show his pace and score". The Star wrote "an impressive display was given by A. McInnarney, the New Zealand league player, who made his first appearance on the wing. He got few opportunities, but revealed speed which indicates that he will be an asset to the side in future matches if given more opportunities". The Herald said the Army side "had an advantage in speed, the wingers, Schubert and McInnarney, being especially fast".

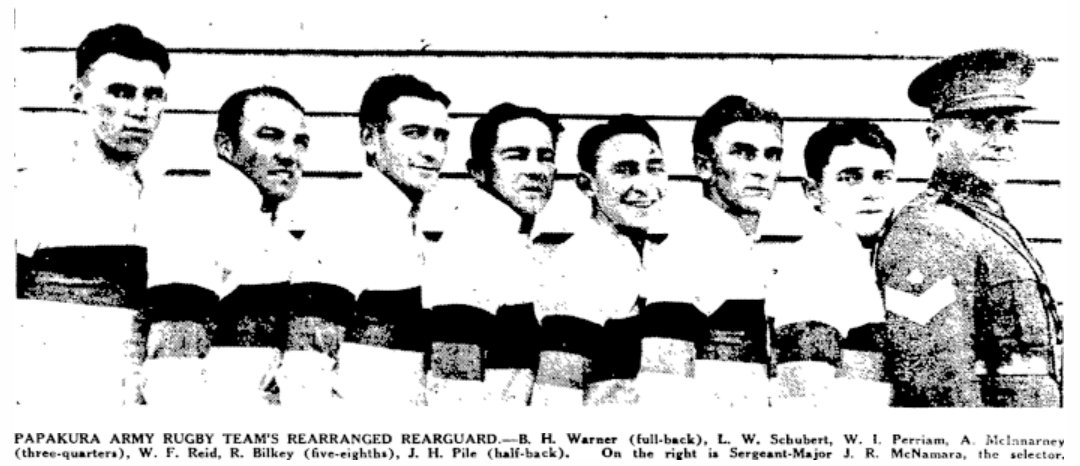
McInnarney in the Papakura Army team in mid July.

He played in their next match a week later on 19 July, scoring another try. They were defeated by Marist at Eden Park in what was said to be the largest crowd of the season to that point. In the first half Marist "had the upper hand till Reid, Pyle and McInnarney got away to the other end, where Perram had a penalty shot that went aside". Later the Army backs made a run which "saw McInnarney go through Sorenson's tackle to score a corner try". In the second half when they were trailing "Pile and McInnarney got away, the latter knocking the corner flag". The Auckland Star wrote that "on paper the Army has the best three-quarter line in the competition, Willis Perriam, captain of the South Island reps., in the centre, and Lyndsay Schubert, Auckland representative, and A. McInnarney, Auckland and New Zealand league player, on the wings". He likely then played in their matches with Grammar on 26 July, and a friendly game with Hopuhopu on 6 August. In the side was fellow New Zealand rugby league teammate Jack Smith. McInnarney then scored another try in wet conditions at Eden Park against Suburbs. The Army side won 19 to 3. He was playing in the centre position for the match and his try came in the second half, scoring "well out". It came after R. Bilkey had 'sold a dummy' before passing to McInnarney to score.

Army then beat Takapuna 12–5. Army were much weakened with the majority of its former players on leave from the army, but they met a Takapuna team which "threw away winning chances". In the first half "[Denny] Brady made … a good scoring chance for Army, and McInnarney was downed at the line, inches short…". The play during the game was said to have "swung more to Schubert's wing than to that of McInnarney, who received very limited opportunities".

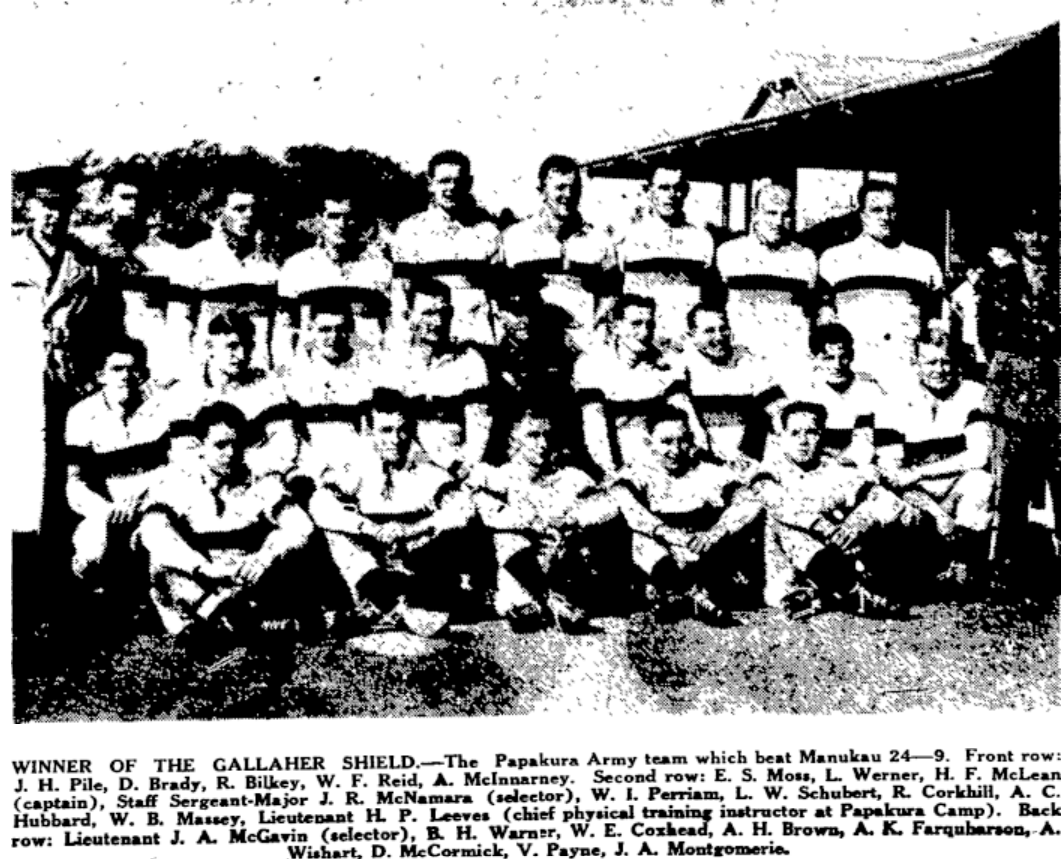

The Papakura Army side had won the first section of the Auckland club championship, while Manukau had won the second section. This meant the two times would meet in the final for the Gallaher Shield for the 1941 season. McInnarney was named on the wing for the final with Schubert being omitted. This was considered a surprise as he was the Auckland representative and former North Island three-quarter. On the other wing L. Werner was named, who had played for Otago against Southland a week prior while Willis Perriam was at centre and had also played for Otago in the same game. The Papakura Army side won the Gallaher Shield "before a large crowd at Eden Park", estimated at 6,000 by 24 points to 9. Early in the game Army attacked but Manukau kicked clear before the Army fullback, Brian Warner took the ball and then beat two men near halfway before passing to McInnarney who "clapped on the pace and outwitted the defence to score a fine try at the corner". Later in the half the Army side showed "splendid moves" in "reverse passing with McLean, Bilkey, Brady and McInnarney prominent, always gained valuable ground". In the second half Manukau mounted a comeback to take a 9–6 lead but then the Army side took control and ran in several tries. McInnarney's second came when Brady made a break and sent a long pass to him and he scored well out. The Star wrote a short piece under the heading "Typical Wing's Try" which said "the opening try scored by McInnarney for the Army was a typical wing-threequarters effort, reminiscent of some seen in the old days. Credit must also go to Warner, the full-back, who started the movement, but McInnarney finished it off in great style. Clapping on the pace he set sail for the line with great determination and dived over a yard inside the corner flag, with the defence in hot pursuit". The Herald wrote "McInnarney's speed enabled him to outdistance opposition players with comparative ease, an attribute which earned him the first try… on another occasion McInnarney finished off one of the most brilliant movements ever seen at Eden Park. McLean started it, and handed on to Brady, who made considerable ground. The latter passed to Perriam, whose swerve infield disorganised the defence. Perriam threw a long pass to McInnarney, who crossed the line. The try was disallowed, as the referee ruled a forward pass, and McInnarney's disgust was evident".

The Auckland Rugby Union then selected the Grammar club side, who had the second best record during the second round to play Army for the Jubilee Trophy. McInnarney was named to play for the Army team. The Grammar side caused an upset by winning 9 to 6 though the Army forward pack was almost a completely new one. McInnarney and Schubert, the wings, "saw little of the ball". Later in the year McInnarney had moved down to the Waiouru Military Camp and while there he played in an army match for a North side against a South side in late November. His North side won 15 to 3 and he scored one of their three tries.

==== Rugby and Rugby League hiatus ====
The 1942 season was an unusual one for McInnarney. He was seemingly in New Zealand for the entire year and didn't embark for Europe until some time during 1943. On 23 May he played in a Tank Brigade side against Wanganui at Spriggens Park in Whanganui. The side included two All Blacks in R.M. McKenzie and C.K. Saxton and several other representative players with McInnarney mentioned as being a New Zealand league international. Also in the team was cricket representative Martin Donnelly. The full name of McInnarney's side was the New Zealand Army Tank Brigade and they won 19 points to 12 in drizzling rain. McInnarney scored one of their four tries before a good crowd. The Whanganui Chronicle reported that "in C. Sullivan and A. McInnarney, they had two speedy wingers, who gave everything a go which came their way". On 4 June 1942, it was reported that a challenge had been received by the Auckland Rugby Union by a football team "of a southern military camp". McInnarney was named on the wing for the military side. On 15 August he played against Auckland in Auckland on the wing. They lost 22–3.

In mid September the seventeenth ballot "under the National Service Emergency Regulations, 1940, for service with the Armed Forces" was announced. The list included 22,395 names. Arthur McInnarney was named among them with it stated that the lists included "the names of a number of men who have volunteered for overseas service, and also includes the names of some men who are already serving in home defence units". It appears that McInnarney fell into the latter category. The 1st New Zealand Army Tank Brigade had been formed in New Zealand in 1941 to provide the 2nd New Zealand Division with armoured support in North Africa. However, when war broke out in the Pacific it was retained in New Zealand. Then in 1942 it was disbanded with most of its personnel being used to establish the 4th New Zealand Armoured Brigade in Egypt.

=== Military Service in North Africa ===
==== 1943 ====
Prior to departing for his military service McInnarney made a brief reappearance for his Mt Albert rugby league side. He played in their second preliminary round game against Marist at Carlaw Park #2 on 17 April. He scored a try in their 20–13 win and the New Zealand Herald made a note that he did not play last season.

==== 1945 ====
In 1945, after the war had ended in Europe, the New Zealand Military decided to play rugby games before returning to New Zealand. On 10 September at Lake Trasimeno in Italy there were trial teams named to select a side to tour Britain. The selectors for the tour were Major Victor Butler, Warrant Officer John Hore, and Lance Bombardier Ron Stewart, who were all former All Blacks. In total ninety-seven players were named to play across several games, with many well known players in the two oval ball codes such as Fred Allen, Len Jordan, Johnny Simpson, Jack Rutherford, and Arthur McInnarney. For three weeks 60 players took "part in strenuous trials at Klagenfurt so that an extra 23 could be selected to join the 38 already in England and to take part in the final trials for the selection of the N.Z.E.F. touring side". In the weekend of 29–30 September there were two final matches played in Austria at Vienna. McInnarney scored a try in one of the matches which was won by the New Zealand side 41 to 5 against a French team which "was representing only a small force, recruited largely from Maquis". In McInnarney's side was Bob Scott who had played club rugby league in Auckland against McInnarney before the war. It appears that McInnarney was not selected to play in the final trial in Britain as there was no mention of him beyond this point. It was also suggested later on that he had been injured trialing for the main touring side.

=== Return to New Zealand and resumption of rugby league career ===
==== 1947 New Zealand, North Island, and Mt Albert ====
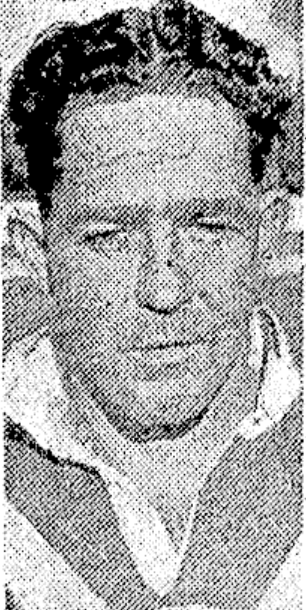
McInnarney in his Mt Albert jersey in 1947.

In 1947 McInnarney had returned to his former Mt Albert rugby league club. He was chosen for Auckland to play a 'rest of the North Island' team. Then a week later he was selected by Scotty McClymont, Colin Siddle, and Albert Falwasser in the North Island team to play the South Island. The match was played at Carlaw Park on 5 July and saw the North Island team win 24–12 before what was said to be "the greatest crowd in the history of Carlaw Park" with somewhere between 20,000 and 35,000 present. Following the match there were "ten certainties" named for the New Zealand side to tour Britain and France with another trial to be held on Tuesday the 8th. Then after the trial which was attended by 5,000 spectators McInnarney was chosen in the three quarters by selectors Scotty McClymont, Ernie Asher, and Jim Amos for the tour. It was said that he was 28 years old (though he was actually now 29), weighed 12st 6 lb, and was 5 ft 9 lb.

On 15 August a civic function was held at the Auckland Town Hall to farewell the New Zealand rugby league team. The Mayor of Auckland, Mr. John Allum spoke to a large crowd and gave "special congratulations" to "Arthur McInnarney, who had overcome a serious war wound to be the only member of the 1939 team who had again been selected". The players left on board the RMS Rangitiki liner for Britain later that night with more than 2,000 spectators watching its departure.

On the tour McInnarney played a total of seventeen games. Fourteen were in the England portion of the tour while the other three were in France. His first game of the tour was on the wing against St Helens on 25 September in New Zealand's opening match. New Zealand won 11–5 at Knowsley Road before a crowd of 25,000. Then on his next match he scored one of his four tries on the tour. It came against York on 1 October at White Rose Ave, York where he was once again playing on the wing. New Zealand won 29–0. Early in the game McInnarney "showed speed in two brilliant runs and once crossed the line but the referee called him back for and infringement". Soon after the start of the second half he "made the opening for Charlie McBride's second try and later he "made an unopposed run and crossed in the corner". McInnarney then played in the 5th game of the tour, against Castleford on Wednesday, 8 October. He was on the left wing and New Zealand won 17–3 before 10,000 spectators at Wheldon Road. During the second half McInnarney "made a good run down the sideline and spoiled a chance by kicking straight into touch". Then later in the game with the score 12–3 "New Zealand started a clear cut movement from which [Arthur] Gillman scored after receiving a pass from the winger McInnarney". The try was described "… then came a 70-yard burst with six men backing up – that was a thriller," said the report. "McInnarney raced 50 yards along the left wing, timed his pass infield correctly and the hefty South Island policemen, A. Gillman, of Hokitika, finished it with a try in the Frank Burge's fashion".

Another win followed against Bradford Northern at Odsal Stadium on Saturday, 11 October. New Zealand victorious by 17 to 7 before a large crowd of 17,500. In detailed comments on the game the Greymouth Evening Star had a piece which said "McInnarney, the Auckland winger, raced for 50 yards and on facing [Eric]Batten turned infield to find three forwards waiting for his pass. [Travers] Hardwick handled first and transferred to Ken Mountford, who at the time was filling the half-back position, and [Jack] Newton finally received to cross between the posts. He had been on the right wing this time. In a special piece, the try was described as "probably the finest try seen so far on the tour. "Arthur McInnarney took the ball, with a good pass from [Doug] Anderson and set out along the sideline. The first pass was from right on the Kiwi's own line. When hemmed in at half-way, McInnarney sent to Hardwick, to Mountford, to McBride, and back to Newton who touched down. It was a most attractive movement which swept all before it".

With New Zealand to play Leigh in the 8th game of the tour on 15 October at Kirkhall Lane in Leigh, there were only thirteen fully fit players. McInnarney moved in from the wing to play at centre. In a tough game New Zealand managed to win 10–5 after being behind 2–0 at halftime. With the score still 2–0 with twenty minutes remaining New Zealand finally scored and took the lead when "McInnarney first took operation to halfway and then [Len] Jordan, in a smart piece of work, broke through and passed to Anderson, who scored".

McInnarney was to then play the one and only test match of his career when he played on the wing on 18 October against Wales in Swansea. It was the second test match of the tour after New Zealand played England in the first test of three between them on 4 October. New Zealand played well before a crowd of 18,283 to win 28–20. Early in the game with New Zealand ahead 5–0, "McInnarney prevented Wales scoring by bundling [Emlyn] Walters into touch when he seemed set for the New Zealand goal line". He played in the next game, four days later on 22 October against Wigan at Central Park, Wigan. New Zealand won narrowly, 10 to 8 with Clarke, McInnarney, Forrest, and Hardwick being "the most conspicuous New Zealand players".

McInnarney didn't play against Salford in the 11th game of the tour but was recalled into the side for the following game with Hunslet on 29 October. Like so many of his other appearances on the tour he played on the left wing. New Zealand suffered an 18–10 defeat at Parkside, Hunslet with 5,553 spectators present. McInnarney missed the game with Hull on 1 November, before playing once more against Batley on Tuesday, 4 November at Mount Pleasant, Batley. New Zealand suffered a 19–18 defeat with McInnarney scoring his second try of the tour playing on the left wing once more. The game was played in "dull, showery weather" before 3,510 spectators. Batley dominated the early stages but failed to score, then "the Kiwis combined effectively, [Roy] Clark and Barchard handling well to finally send McInnarney over for a try".

McInnarney then missed the next four tour matches against England, Leeds, Warrington, and Halifax before returning to the side to play in the 19th match. New Zealand lost 12–7 at Fartown, Huddersfield to Huddersfield with 8,872 in attendance in "which wind and rain demanded a high degree of adaptability". He was in the right wing for this match replacing Forrest who had originally been named there. McInnarney then missed the 7–0 loss to Widnes before playing on the left wing in a 24–5 win over Dewsbury at Crown Flatt, Dewsbury on 29 November before 7,270. He didn't play against Workington Town on 3 December, but did the following day on 4 December when the New Zealand side drew with Barrow 2–2 at Craven Park, Barrow-in-Furness before 5,565 spectators. There was no score in the second half "on a soft ground". During the first half Len Jordan and McInnarney "put in several speedy bursts" to force New Zealand "toward the home line" but they could not convert the territory into points. Two days later McInnarney scored two tries on the left wing in a 30–3 win over Wakefield Trinity. The match was played at Belle Vue, Wakefield on Saturday, 6 December with 11,959 in the crowd. The New Zealand attack performed very well and in the first half "the Kiwis kept sweeping up field in a series of rushes. McGregor made an opening for McInnarney to score". Wakefield missed a penalty and then "McInnarney again penetrated the defence to give the Kiwis a 9–3 lead at halftime". In post game comments it was said that "Robertson and McInnarney were always dangerous in attack" despite the ground being heavy. He was chosen initially in the side to play Bramley on 10 December but ultimately did not take the field. His last game on the England leg of the tour was against Belle Vue Rangers at Belle Vue, Manchester on 13 December. He was on the right win in a 19–3 win. Bill McKenzie who had been playing on the right wing had a recurring thigh injury hence McInnarney taking that position. The last match of the England leg was the third test against England on 20 December with McInnarney named in a squad of 15 players but he failed to make the final 13. The decision for the left wing was between Jordan and McInnarney but Jordan was preferred after his "outstanding game against Wakefield" where he scored three tries. New Zealand moved to France to begin a series of nine games in late December with McInnarney playing in four of the games before their return to New Zealand.

==== 1948 NZ Trial, Auckland, and Mt Albert ====
The 1948 season was to be McInnarney's last playing representative rugby league. He played in a New Zealand trial match in May before playing in four matches for Auckland including three on a short tour. McInnarney was now aged 30 but still maintained his form. On 4 May the North Island and South Island teams were named for the inter-island game to be played on Saturday, 8 May with a curtain-raiser being played between Possible and Probable trial teams to help the New Zealand selectors chose the team for the tour of Australia. He was named on the wing in the Possibles side. After the two matches the New Zealand selectors named their touring side with McInnarney missing out and Jack Forrest, Bill McKenzie, and Dave Redmond chosen as the wing three-quarters for the eight match tour. Following the return of the New Zealand team a match was arranged between them and Auckland at Carlaw Park on Sunday, 20 June. McInnarney was named on the wing opposite Allan Wiles a Mt Albert clubmate. The Auckland team easily won by 30 points to 9 before 11,000 spectators with the backs and forwards dominating against a side that was fatigued from the tour and missing some key players.

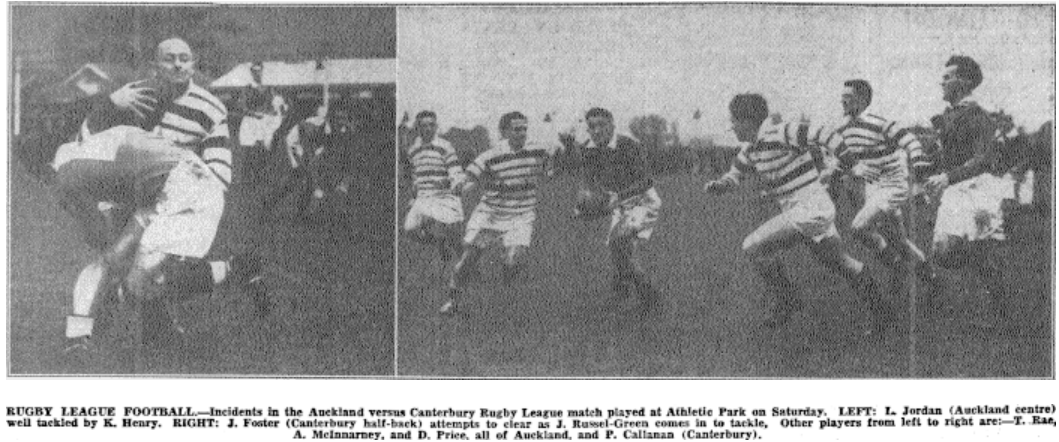
McInnarney playing for Auckland against Canterbury. He is approaching to tackle on the right.

McInnarney was then named in the Auckland touring side to play three matches against Canterbury, West Coast, and Wellington in mid July. The selectors were Jim Clark, Dougie McGregor, and Stan Prentice. He was named in the first tour game against Canterbury to be played on 17 July at Athletic Park. Auckland won a "fast and spectacular game" 32 to 22. McInnarney did not start the game but he appeared in a photograph showing the play during the game so he clearly came on as a replacement.

The next game against West Coast just a day later at Wingham Park in Greymouth. McInnarney played on the left wing in an 18–2 loss before a crowd of 4,000. The Auckland team was criticised as playing "like first graders" in a match which "was highlighted throughout by flying fists, and hasty tongues". For a disappointing Auckland side it was said that "perhaps, R. Cunninghman, A. McInnarney and R. Roff could be separated from the remainder. They worked hard, and were responsible for many openings, which, if they had been followed up, would have resulted in a score". Just two days later the Auckland side played its final tour match, against Wellington on 20 July. Auckland won 14–5 on the Basin Reserve in Wellington before 2,500 spectators in wet weather. McInnarney on the wing "was a source of danger" throughout the match. His try came in the second half when the "Wellington defence collapsed under the strong Auckland attack". It was the be the last representative game of McInnarney's career and he seemingly retired at the end of the season.

== Personal life ==
=== World War 2 ===
At the time of his enlistment McInnarney's address was listed as "N.Z. Newspapers, Shortland St., Auckland". While his next of kin was his wife, Freda Eleanor McInnarney (née Miller) who was living on Nixon Avenue., Otahuhu. His address was more likely his workplace as he worked at the Auckland Star newspaper. He was a compositor's apprentice by trade. He was a Trooper in the war in the 4th Armoured Brigade as part of the Second New Zealand Expeditionary Force. It was reported on 29 September 1944 in the Auckland Star that he had been wounded with his rank listed at Corporal. Following the war he was awarded the War Medal 1939-1945 and the New Zealand War Service Medal.

=== Marriage and Family ===
Arthur McInnarney married Freda Eleanor Miller in 1938. They had a son named Terence Kerrigan McInnarney Godsmark (1941–2007). He separated from his wife and she remarried while Arthur married Olga May Morgan in 1950. They had a son. Arthur died on 8 June 1986, aged 68, at Greenwoods Private Hospital in Epsom. He had been living in Ellerslie prior to this.
