= 1945 New Zealand rugby league season =

Seasons
- 1944 1946

The 1945 New Zealand rugby league season was the 38th season of rugby league that had been played in New Zealand.

== International competitions ==
New Zealand played in no international matches due to World War II.

In December Blackball's Ces Mountford and Ponsonby's Brian Nordgren signed with Wigan. The New Zealand Rugby League protested, however Wigan pointed out that the international transfer ban imposed in 1937 had lapsed in 1941.

== National competitions ==
=== Northern Union Cup ===
West Coast again held the Northern Union Cup at the end of the season.

=== Inter-district competition ===
The West Coast defeated Canterbury 60–5 at Wingham Park and 35–10 in Christchurch.

Auckland defeated South Auckland 46–7 at Carlaw Park and 26–13 in Huntly before defeating Wellington 46–7 at Carlaw Park and 47–17 in Wellington. They then hosted the West Coast, defeating them 8-7 after Warwick Clarke converted a late penalty goal.

Auckland included Roy Clark, Brian Nordgren, Pita Ririnui, Travers Hardwick, Warwick Clarke, Bernie Lowther and Roy Nurse. The West Coast included Jack Forrest, Charlie McBride, Ces, Bill and Ken Mountford while Canterbury included Ces Davison, Pat Smith, Ray Brown and Arthur Gillman.

The first Schoolboy tournament took place with the West Coast, Canterbury and Auckland competing in Greymouth. The West Coast side was captained by George Menzies and Auckland were captained by Bruce Robertson.

== Club competitions ==
=== Auckland ===
Otahuhu won the Auckland Rugby League's Fox Memorial Trophy and Rukutai Shield. North Shore won the Roope Rooster and Stormont Shield.

Cyril Eastlake joined Ellerslie. Otahuhu included Claude Hancox, Joffre Johnson and Johnson's three brothers; Ivan, Mick and Norm. Ponsonby included Brian Nordgren, who scored 267 points in all rugby league games (Ponsonby, Auckland, and the North Island) during the season. The North Shore Albions included Bruce Graham, Verdun Scott, captain Roy Clark, Jack Russell-Green, Les Pye and Ivor Stirling.

=== Wellington ===
Waterside won the Wellington Rugby League's Appleton Shield.

=== Canterbury ===
Sydenham won the Canterbury Rugby League's Massetti Cup.

The competition consisted of Waimairi-Woolston-Hollywood, Addington, Hornby, Sydenham and Linwood.

=== Other Competitions ===
Blackball defeated Sydenham 18–15 to win the Thacker Shield.
