= 1943 New Zealand rugby league season =

Seasons
- ← 1942 1944 →

The 1943 New Zealand rugby league season was the 36th season of rugby league that had been played in New Zealand.

== International competitions ==
New Zealand played in no international matches due to World War II.

== National competitions ==
=== Northern Union Cup ===
West Coast again held the Northern Union Cup at the end of the season.

=== Inter-district competition ===
Waikato defeated Auckland at Carlaw Park during the season. They were not to repeat this feat until 1997.

== Club competitions ==
=== Auckland ===
Manukau won the Auckland Rugby League's Fox Memorial Trophy, Rukutai Shield, Roope Rooster and Stormont Shield.

Manukau also defeated Blackball 23–9 at Carlaw Park in October.

Manukau included Puti Tipene (Steve) Watene, Jack Hemi and Pita Ririnui.

=== Wellington ===
Petone won the Wellington Rugby League's Appleton Shield.

=== Canterbury ===
Sydenham-Rakaia won the Canterbury Rugby League's Massetti Cup.

The competition consisted of Sydenham-Rakaia, Hornby, Linwood-Woolston, Addington, Central and Army Combined.

=== Other Competitions ===
Blackball, who won the West Coast Rugby League championship, were not challenged for the Thacker Shield. Blackball included Bob Aynsley, Ray Nuttall and Ken, Cecil and Bill Mountford.
