= 1944 New Zealand rugby league season =

Seasons
- ← 1943 1945 →

The 1944 New Zealand rugby league season was the 37th season of rugby league that had been played in New Zealand.

== International competitions ==
New Zealand played in no international matches due to World War II.

== National competitions ==
=== Northern Union Cup ===
West Coast again held the Northern Union Cup at the end of the season.

=== Inter-district competition ===
The West Coast defeated Canterbury 23–18.

== Club competitions ==
=== Auckland ===
City won the Auckland Rugby League's Fox Memorial Trophy, Rukutai Shield and Stormont Shield. Ponsonby won the Roope Rooster.

=== Wellington ===
Randwick won the Wellington Rugby League's Appleton Shield.

=== Canterbury ===
Addington won the Canterbury Rugby League's Massetti Cup.

The competition consisted of Hornby, Linwood, Addington, Riccarton, Sydenham-Rakaia and Woolston-Hollywood.

Addington defeated Blackball 11–10 to win the Thacker Shield and also defeated Randwick 19–18.
