= Len Pegg =

Australian rugby league footballer

Leg Pegg
Personal information
- Full name: Leonard Richard Pegg
- Born: 4 June 1922 Sydney, NSW, Australia
- Died: 27 September 1999 (aged 77)

Playing information
- Position: Centre
Representative
Years	Team	Pld	T	G	FG	P
1945–49	Queensland	13	3	0	0	9
1948	Australia	2	1	0	0	3

Leonard Richard Pegg (4 June 1922 – 27 September 1999) was an Australian international rugby league footballer.

Pegg was born in Sydney and served with the Royal Australian Air Force in World War II.

A centre, Pegg made his representative debut for Queensland in 1945 and was playing for Brisbane club Souths when he earned his international call up. He appeared in both Test matches for the Kangaroos against the touring 1948 New Zealand team, making his debut at the Sydney Cricket Ground. Australia lost that match, before winning the second fixture in Brisbane, with Pegg contributing a try. He also toured Great Britain and France with the 1948–49 Kangaroos, but didn't feature in any of the international matches.

Pegg coached Mackay club Marian to an undefeated season in 1950, then signed up to coach Norths in Rockhampton. He coached the North Queensland representative side which faced England in 1954.
