= Ron Crossley =

Australian rugby league footballer

Playing information
- Position: Fullback, Wing
Club
Years	Team	Pld	T	G	FG	P
1949–50	North Sydney	25	4	80	0	172

Ron Crossley was an Australian rugby league footballer.

== Rugby league career ==
Crossley was a goal–kicking fullback and winger from Newcastle. He played locally for Northern Suburbs and was in the Newcastle representative side which faced the visiting 1948 New Zealand team, kicking three goals in a 9–10 loss. In 1949, Crossley was signed by North Sydney and accumulated a club high 110 points in his first season, which included 22 points (two tries & eight goals) in a draw against Parramatta. He had one further season with North Sydney before continuing his career in Maitland.
