= Bill McKenzie (rugby league) =

New Zealand international rugby league footballer

Personal information
- Full name: Adrian William McKenzie
- Born: 20 September 1923 West Coast Region, New Zealand
- Died: 11 September 1985 (aged 61)

Playing information
- Position: Wing
Club
Years	Team	Pld	T	G	FG	P
	Unknown (CRL)
	Unknown (ARL)
	Ngaruawahia (WRL)
1952	Marist (CRL)
	Total	0	0	0	0	0
Representative
Years	Team	Pld	T	G	FG	P
	Canterbury
1947–52	South Island
1947–52	New Zealand	3	1	0	0	3
1950	Auckland
1950	North Island

Bill McKenzie was a New Zealand rugby league footballer who represented New Zealand.

== Playing career ==
McKenzie played in the Canterbury Rugby League competition and represented Canterbury.

In 1947 he was first selected for the New Zealand national rugby league team, for the 1947–48 tour of Great Britain and France in which he played in eight matches against club sides, and twice more in the 1948 tour of Australia. However, he did not make his test debut until 1949 against Australia when he played in both test matches and also for the South Island against the Kangaroo tourists.

In 1950 he moved north and represented both Auckland and the North Island. He also played for the Ngaruawahia club in the Waikato Rugby League competition.

In 1952 he returned home, joining the newly formed Marist club in the Canterbury Rugby League competition. This helped relaunch his career and he was again selected for New Zealand, after a three-year absence.
