= Allan Wiles =

New Zealand international rugby league player & cricketer (1920-2008)

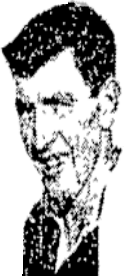

Personal information
- Full name: Allan Victor Wiles
- Born: 29 September 1920 Auckland, New Zealand
- Died: 31 May 2008 (aged 87) Auckland, New Zealand

Playing information
- Position: Centre
Club
Years	Team	Pld	T	G	FG	P
1945	Mount Albert (ARL)	20	7	0	0	21
Representative
Years	Team	Pld	T	G	FG	P
1945	Auckland Pākehā	1	1	0	0	3
1945	Auckland	3	1	0	0	3
1948	New Zealand	1	0	0	0	0
- Source: As of 12 August 2023

Allan Victor Wiles (29 September 1920 – 31 May 2008) was a New Zealand rugby league footballer and cricketer. He represented New Zealand in rugby league.

== Cricket career ==
Wiles played five first-class matches for Auckland during the 1946/47 season.

== Rugby league career ==
Wiles played for the Mount Albert club in the Auckland Rugby League competition and also represented Auckland.

In 1948, he was named for New Zealand and toured Australia. He played in one of the two test matches, becoming Kiwi #312.

In 1951, during the French tour of New Zealand, Wiles was part of the Auckland side that lost to France 10 – 15.

== See also ==
- List of Auckland representative cricketers
