= Claud Hancox =

New Zealand rugby league player

Personal information
- Full name: Claud Charles John Hancox
- Born: 28 September 1917 Whanganui, New Zealand
- Died: 7 October 1957 (aged 40) Mount Ruapehu, New Zealand

Playing information

Rugby union
- Position: Forward
Club
Years	Team	Pld	T	G	FG	P
1946	North Auckland	1	0	0	0	0

Rugby league
- Position: Second-row
Club
Years	Team	Pld	T	G	FG	P
	Otahuhu
Representative
Years	Team	Pld	T	G	FG	P
	Auckland
1947–48	New Zealand	0	0	0	0	0

Claud Charles John Hancox is a New Zealand rugby football player who represented New Zealand in rugby league.

== Playing career ==
Hancox originally played rugby union. He played for the Warkworth Rugby Football Club and is one of only four players from that club to have represented North Auckland. Hancox played for North Auckland against Australia during their 1946 tour of New Zealand. North Auckland won the match 32-19.

At the same time, Hancox also played rugby league for the Otahuhu Leopards. He was part of the Otahuhu side that won the 1945 Auckland Rugby League competition and he also represented Auckland.

In 1947 he was selected for the New Zealand squad as part of their tour of Great Britain. He did not play in any test matches on the tour.
