= Ray Cranch =

New Zealand international rugby league footballer (1923–2021)

Ray Cranch MNZM
- Born: Raymond James Cranch; 7 January 1923; New Zealand
- Died: 13 October 2021 (aged 98); Auckland, New Zealand
- Rugby league career

Playing information
- Position: Prop
Club
Years	Team	Pld	T	G	FG	P
	Mount Albert Lions
Representative
Years	Team	Pld	T	G	FG	P
1947–50	Auckland
1951–52	New Zealand	0	0	0	0	0

Raymond James Cranch MNZM (7 January 1923 – 13 October 2021) was a New Zealand rugby league footballer who represented the New Zealand national rugby league team. He also served in World War II, training in Maardi in Egypt and fighting in Monte Cassino in Italy. He received a Year of the Veteran Certificate of Appreciation for his service given to New Zealand during World War II by the Rt Honourable Helen Clark, Prime Minister.

== Army career ==
When war was declared in 1939, Cranch was an apprentice with Charles Day and Sons on Khyber Pass Road in Auckland. Cranch and his friend Russell Gribbel jumped on their bikes and cycled over to Pompalier Street to sign up for the territorials. Cranch gave a false age as he was 16, whereas the age limit was 18. He was posted to the 1st field regiment in NZ artillery. The camp was at the Avondale Racecourse. They then travelled to Rotorua where they had another camp in Arawa park at the racecourse, then they did a trek down to Waiouru. He attended Narrow Neck Infantry School for gas and weapons training - e.g. pistol and 303 Lee Enfield. A year later he was asked to be a lance bombardier and go to the training camp in Rotorua. He finished with his apprenticeship (12 shillings a week) and went full time with the army (7 shillings a day). The lance bombardier role meant he was second in command of a gun crew of six. He was the gunner that serviced the guns and shells.

Cranch came back into the army just before Pearl Harbor in December 1941. He was in a camp at Hopuhopu near Ngaruawahia and in the morning had to dig trenches in the gum trees in case they were attacked by the Japanese. The regiment went to the Bombay area in Auckland where they carried out exercises for another year. He was picked for OCTU (Officer Cadet Training Unit) and was promoted to a gun sergeant whereby commissioned as a 2nd lieutenant.

== Playing career ==
A member of the Mount Albert Lions, Cranch represented Auckland. He captained Auckland in 1950.

Cranch was selected for New Zealand in 1951-52 Cranch played in one test match on tour.

Cranch was also captain of the award-winning Auckland Softball team, which won the Beatty Cup and the Coca-Cola trophy as the team retained the national championship at Te Kuiti in 1950. He was heavily involved with the Piha Surf Life Saving Club, where he gained an Instructor's Certificate from the New Zealand Surf Lifesaving Association on 15 February 1964.

== Later years ==
Cranch was later the manager of the Auckland side and in 1973 he was a selector. He was secretary-manager for the Auckland Leagues Club for more than 20 years and later served as president.

Cranch was a life member of both the Auckland Rugby League and New Zealand Rugby League. In the 2006 Queen's Birthday Honours, Cranch was appointed a Member of the New Zealand Order of Merit, for services to sport, especially rugby league.

In 2020, the second-tier (senior B) Auckland rugby league competition was named the Ray Cranch Cup.

On 27 March 2021, Cranch was named as patron of the Auckland Rugby League during the sporting body's 111th annual general meeting. Aged 98, he was at the meeting in Mount Wellington and thanked those in attendance for the honour at the conclusion of the meeting.

Cranch died in Auckland on 13 October 2021, at the age of 98. At the time of his death, he was the oldest living former Kiwis player.
