= Bob Aynsley =

NZ international rugby league player

Personal information
- Full name: Robert Aynsley
- Born: 5 January 1922 New Zealand
- Died: 12 October 2012 (aged 90) Greymouth, New Zealand

Playing information
- Position: Hooker
Club
Years	Team	Pld	T	G	FG	P
	Blackball (WCRL)
Representative
Years	Team	Pld	T	G	FG	P
	West Coast
	South Island
1946–49	New Zealand	5	0	0	0	0

Robert Aynsley (5 January 1922 – 12 October 2012) was a New Zealand rugby league player. He played five test matches for the New Zealand national rugby league team.

== Playing career ==
Aynsley played for Blackball and represented the West Coast and the South Island before first being selected for the New Zealand national rugby league team in 1946. He played in five test matches, his last in 1949. He played in 15 tour games on the 1947–1948 tour of Great Britain and France.

== Later years ==
After retirement, Aynsley was a referee from 1953 to 1960. He then served as a selector for the West Coast, South Island and New Zealand age group sides. Aynsley also sat on the West Coast Rugby League Board of Control for 18 years and worked as a groundsman at Wingham Park into his seventies.

He was named a Life Member of the West Coast Rugby League in 1978 and a Life Member of the New Zealand Rugby League in 1989.

Aynsley died in Greymouth on 12 October 2012.
