= Wingham Park =

- Interactive map of Wingham Park
- Location: Greymouth, West Coast, New Zealand
- Coordinates: 42.43828125°S 171.230131386°E
- Owner: West Coast Rugby League
- Capacity: 4000

Tenant
- West Coast Chargers

Wingham Park is a rugby league stadium in Greymouth, New Zealand. The ground is owned by the West Coast Rugby League.

== History ==
Wingham Park is the home of rugby league on the West Coast and hosts the West Coast Rugby League grand final each year. It has hosted one test match, New Zealand against Great Britain in 1954. It is the smallest rugby league test venue in the world, holding 4000 people.

In 2006 the ground hosted the New Zealand national rugby league team again when they played the New Zealand Residents.

In 2011 the ground hosted the New Zealand Warriors where they played the Newcastle Knights in a National Rugby League warm up match. The game served as a fundraiser for the region after the Pike River Mine disaster.
