= Rex Cunningham (rugby league) =

New Zealand international rugby league footballer

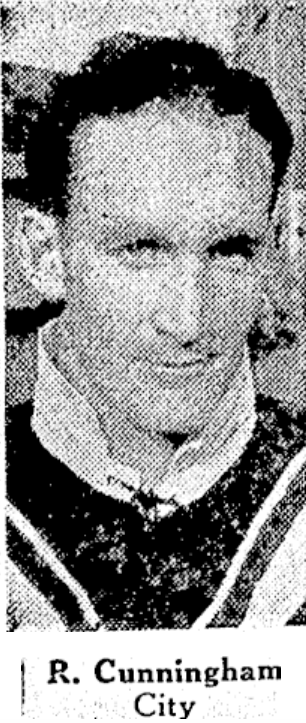

Personal information
- Born: 11 January 1924 New Zealand
- Died: 19 November 2015 (aged 91) Taupaki, Auckland Region, New Zealand

Playing information
- Position: Halfback
Club
Years	Team	Pld	T	G	FG	P
1944–1948	City Rovers (Auckland)	19	1	0	0	3
	Mount Albert Lions
	Total	19	1	0	0	3
Representative
Years	Team	Pld	T	G	FG	P
1945	Auckland	1	0	0	0	0
1946–48	New Zealand	4	1	0	0	3

Rex Cunningham (11 January 1924 – 19 November 2015) was a New Zealand rugby league player who represented New Zealand.

== Playing career ==
A halfback, Cunningham played for City and the Mount Albert Lions and represented Auckland. He was first selected for New Zealand to play against the touring Great Britain side in 1946, becoming Kiwi number 291.

He then toured Great Britain with New Zealand in 1947–48. During the tour, he scored a test try in the 7–25 loss to France at Bordeaux.

He played 21 games for New Zealand, including four tests, between 1946 and 1948.

== Later years ==
Cunningham died on 19 November 2015, aged 91.
