= Len Jordan (rugby league) =

New Zealand international rugby league footballer

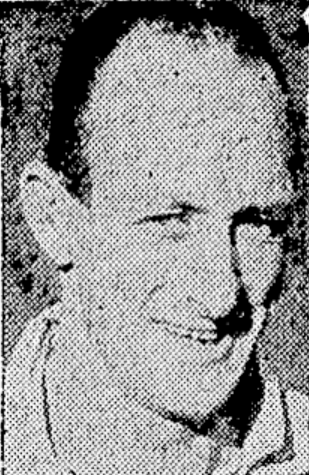

Personal information
- Full name: Leonard Roy Jordan
- Born: 24 January 1920
- Died: 6 November 2014 (aged 94) Takapuna, New Zealand

Playing information
- Position: Centre
Club
Years	Team	Pld	T	G	FG	P
1940–48	Ponsonby		8	0	0	24
Representative
Years	Team	Pld	T	G	FG	P
1942	Auckland Pākēha	1	0	0	0	0
1946–49	New Zealand	7	1	0	0	3
- Relatives: Chris Jordan (son)

Leonard Roy Jordan (24 January 1920 – 6 November 2014) was a New Zealand rugby league footballer. A centre, Jordan represented Auckland at a provincial level, and was a member of the New Zealand national team from 1946 to 1949. He played 29 matches for the Kiwis, including seven test matches. In the 1970s, his son Chris also played international league for New Zealand.

He was a Northcote Tigers junior.
