= John Newton (rugby league) =

New Zealand international rugby league footballer

Personal information
- Born: 9 March 1920 Runanga, New Zealand
- Died: 9 November 1991 (aged 71) Greymouth, New Zealand

Playing information
- Position: Prop
Club
Years	Team	Pld	T	G	FG	P
	Runanga (WCRL)
Representative
Years	Team	Pld	T	G	FG	P
1939–51	West Coast
1939–51	South Island	2	2	0	0	6
1946–50	New Zealand	13	2	0	0	6

John Newton (9 March 1920 – 9 November 1991) was a New Zealand rugby league footballer who represented New Zealand.

== Playing career ==
Newton played for Runanga in the West Coast Rugby League competition. He represented both the West Coast and the South Island.

He was first selected for the New Zealand national rugby league team in 1946, playing against the touring Great Britain Lions. He toured Great Britain and France in 1947 and Australia in 1948 as well as playing in home tests against Australia and Great Britain.
