= Abbie Graham =

Abbie Adella Graham (May 28, 1889 – February 11, 1972) was an American non-fiction author, YWCA secretary, and camp director.

== Biography ==
Abbie Graham was born in Alice, Texas on May 28, 1889, to Rev. John Thomas Graham, a Methodist minister, and Adella Annabelle Bourland. Graham became involved with the YWCA while attending Southwestern University, where she served as president of the university's student association. After graduating in 1910 with a B.A., she taught English for two years in Texas. Throughout the 1910s Graham worked as a secretary for the YWCA's Southwestern Field, which spanned Texas, Oklahoma, and New Mexico. In 1921 she moved to New York City and later directed YWCA camps including Camp Quannacut (Pine Bush, NY) and Camp Winnecunnet (Martha's Vineyard, MA).

Graham was in a long-term relationship with fellow YWCA secretary and writer Grace Coyle.

== Writing career ==
Abbie Graham started her writing career with articles for the YWCA's magazine The Association Monthly. Her first published essays, however, were "The Gift of Leadership" (1916) and "Geographical Adventures in Friendship" (1918), printed in The Inch Library Vol. II and III (Woman's Press).

While working at a YWCA camp in 1921, Graham wrote the lyrics for "Fire Song" with music composed Margaret Kreglow, a student at Smith College and the camp's music director. It was later adopted as a Girl Reserves song.

Fire, fire, swift and free,
Our gifts we consecrate to thee;
Offerings of the woods we make,
Incense of the earth we take.
Silences and memories
And our evening reveries
Unto thy flame we give.

Fire, fire, pure and strong,
Make free our hearts from secret wrong;
Kindle wonder with thy light,
Give us reverential sight;
Lift our souls in high desire;
Radiant mystery of fire,
We bow before thy flame.

Between 1923 and 1942, Graham published 11 books through the Woman's Press, the YWCA's publishing branch. Her works covered subjects including spirituality, race relations, girls' camps, travel, and women's suffrage. Graham also wrote the first biography of Grace Hoadley Dodge, who negotiated the formation of the national YWCA in 1906 and served as the association's first president.

In 1940, Graham received an honorary doctorate in literature from Southwestern University.

== Books ==
- Ceremonials of Common Days, 1923
- Grace H. Dodge: Merchant of Dreams, 1926
- Vain, Pomp and Glory, 1927
- High Occasions, 1930
- Outposts of the imagination, 1930
- The Mother and Daughter Observance, 1932
- The Girls' Camp: Program-Making for Summer Leisure, 1933
- Ladies in Revolt, 1934
- A Vespers Service, "The American Dream," 1938
- Time Off and On, 1939
- Working at Play in Summer Camps, 1941
- On Being Immortal, 1942
