= Roy Nurse =

New Zealand international rugby league footballer

Personal information
- Full name: Roydon Frederick Nurse
- Born: 23 September 1919; Wales
- Died: 7 February 1991 (aged 71); Auckland, New Zealand

Playing information
- Position: Wing
Club
Years	Team	Pld	T	G	FG	P
1937–45	Ponsonby United		39	13	0	143
	Mount Albert United
	Total	0	39	13	0	143
Representative
Years	Team	Pld	T	G	FG	P
1939–45	Auckland Pakehā	8	2	0	0	6
1939–45	Auckland	5	4	0	0	12
1946	New Zealand	1	0	0	0	0
- Source: As of 12 August 2023

Roydon Frederick Nurse was a New Zealand rugby league player who represented New Zealand.

== Playing career ==
Nurse played for the Ponsonby United side in the late 1930s and early 1940s before transferring to the Mount Albert Lions in the Auckland Rugby League competition and also represented Auckland Pakehā in several matches against Auckland Māori and Auckland.

Nurse played one test match for New Zealand in 1946, becoming Kiwi number 286. The test was against the touring Great Britain Lions, and New Zealand won 13-8.
