= Doug Anderson (rugby league) =

New Zealand international rugby league player

Personal information
- Full name: Harry Douglas Anderson
- Born: 28 October 1926 New Zealand
- Died: 15 October 2016 (aged 89) Takapuna, New Zealand

Playing information
- Height: 175 cm (5 ft 9 in)
- Weight: 75 kg (11 st 11 lb)
- Position: Centre, Stand-off
Club
Years	Team	Pld	T	G	FG	P
1945	Point Chevalier	18	1	0	0	3
	Howick
1953–57	Marist
	Total	18	1	0	0	3
Representative
Years	Team	Pld	T	G	FG	P
	Auckland
1947–54	New Zealand	3	0	0	0	0
1948–49	North Island

Harry Douglas Anderson (28 October 1926 – 15 October 2016) was a New Zealand rugby league footballer who represented New Zealand in the 1954 World Cup.

== Playing career ==
Anderson played for Marist, Howick and Point Chevalier in the Auckland Rugby League competition. He represented Auckland and was first selected for the New Zealand national rugby league team in 1947.

Anderson was the first member of the Point Chevalier club to be selected for the Kiwis and went on to play in 22 games, including three test matches, for New Zealand. He represented the North Island in 1948 and 1949 and was part of the New Zealand side selected for the 1954 World Cup.

Anderson was forced to sit out of the 1951 and 1952 seasons due to the transfer system. In 1953 he successfully completed a transfer to Marist and played for his new club until he retired in 1957.
