= Maurie Robertson =

NZ international rugby league footballer and coach

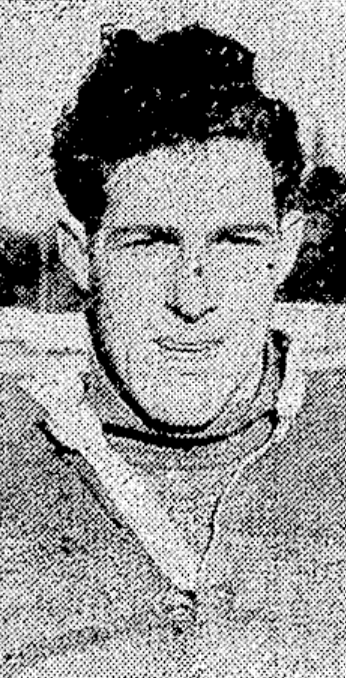

Personal information
- Full name: Maurice Hunter Windsor Robertson
- Born: 19 April 1925 Waihi, New Zealand
- Died: 30 May 2000 (aged 75) Auckland, New Zealand

Playing information
- Position: Centre
Club
| Years | Team | Pld | T | G | FG | P |
|---|---|---|---|---|---|---|
| 1945 | Richmond | 20 | 5 | 0 | 0 | 15 |
Representative
| Years | Team | Pld | T | G | FG | P |
| | Auckland |
| 1946–52 | New Zealand | 18 | 2 | 0 | 0 | 6 |

Coaching information
Club
| Years | Team | Gms | W | D | L | W% |
| | Ellerslie |
Representative
| Years | Team | Gms | W | D | L | W% |
| 1964–65 | New Zealand | 5 | 4 | 0 | 1 | 80 |

Maurice Hunter Wilson Robertson (also known as Maurie or Morrie) was a New Zealand rugby league player, captain and coach who represented, captained and coached New Zealand. He was sibling to Bruce Robertson who also represented New Zealand, and uncle to Wayne Robertson who starred for the Ponsonby Ponies and was a New Zealand, Auckland and Brisbane representative player in the 1970s.

== Playing career ==
Robertson played for Auckland and first represented New Zealand in 1946 against Great Britain. He played for Richmond in the Auckland Rugby League competition. During the 1951 French rugby league tour of Australia and New Zealand, Robertson was selected to play for New Zealand in Auckland.

Robertson retired in 1952, having played in eighteen Test matches for New Zealand.

== Coaching career ==
Robertson served as an Auckland selector in 1958 and assisted the touring South African side in 1963. In 1964 he was made the coach of the New Zealand national rugby league team, serving for two seasons and finishing with a record of four wins and one Test loss.

In the 1970s Robertson returned to coaching Ellerslie. He won the Hyland Memorial Cup as the ARL's coach of the year in 1971 and 1974.

== Later years ==
Robertson participated in an Auckland-based group, 'The Waihi Connection', retaining his links with the area of his birth.

Robertson was made one of the New Zealand Rugby League's Legends of League in 2000.
