= Jack Forrest (rugby league) =

New Zealand rugby league footballer

Personal information
- Full name: John Alexander Forrest
- Born: 24 February 1924 New Zealand
- Died: 26 February 2016 (aged 92) Greymouth, New Zealand

Playing information
- Position: Wing
Club
Years	Team	Pld	T	G	FG	P
	Runanga
Representative
Years	Team	Pld	T	G	FG	P
1945–52	West Coast
1944–52	South Island
1947–52	New Zealand	12	5	0	0	15

John Alexander "Jack" Forrest (24 February 1924 – 26 February 2016) was a New Zealand rugby league footballer who represented New Zealand in 12 international matches between 1947 and 1952. His cousin Jonas Masters also played rugby league for New Zealand.

== Playing career ==
Forrest played in the West Coast Rugby League competition for Runanga and represented both the West Coast and the South Island.

He played in 42 matches, 12 of which were test matches, for the New Zealand national rugby league team, including matches against the 1951 touring French side and on the 1951-52 tour of Great Britain and France.

== Later years ==
Forrest also represented New Zealand in clay pigeon shooting.

He died in Greymouth on 26 February 2016.
