= Charlie McBride (rugby league) =

New Zealand rugby league footballer

Personal information
- Full name: Charles Joseph McBride
- Born: 10 April 1925 Greymouth, New Zealand
- Died: 3 October 2013 (aged 88)

Playing information
- Position: Second-row
Club
Years	Team	Pld	T	G	FG	P
	Marist (WCRL)
	Blackball (WCRL)
	Total	0	0	0	0	0
Representative
Years	Team	Pld	T	G	FG	P
1945–1952	West Coast
1945–51	South Island
1946–52	New Zealand	21	5	0	0	15

Charles Joseph McBride (10 April 1925 – 3 October 2013) was a New Zealand rugby league footballer who represented New Zealand.

== Early life ==
McBride was born in Greymouth. He was educated at the Marist Brothers School, Greymouth.

== Playing career ==
McBride played for the Blackball and Marist clubs in the West Coast Rugby League competition. He played for both the West Coast and the South Island. He was first selected for the New Zealand national rugby league team in 1946 and toured Great Britain and France in 1947 and Australia in 1948. In 1951 he got bitten during a "brutal match" between the Kiwis and the touring French. He played twenty one tests between 1946 and 1952. He was inducted into the New Zealand Rugby League's Legends of League in 2000.
