= Travers Hardwick =

NZ international rugby league footballer & coach

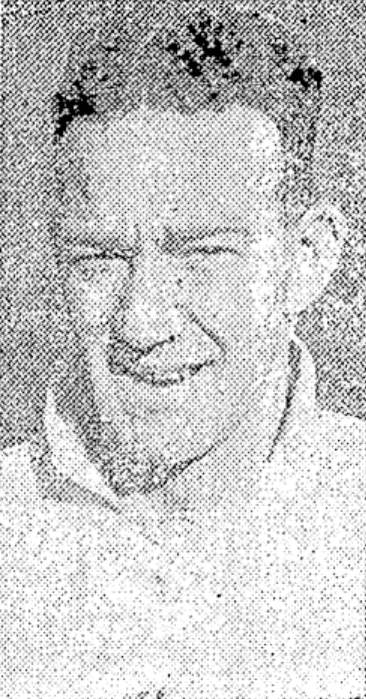

Personal information
- Full name: Travers Harry Hardwick
- Born: 13 March 1923 New Zealand
- Died: 25 April 1979 (aged 56)

Playing information
- Position: Second-row, Loose forward
Club
Years	Team	Pld	T	G	FG	P
1944–49	Ponsonby		11	0	0	33
1950–19??	Ngaruawahia
	Total	0	11	0	0	33
Representative
Years	Team	Pld	T	G	FG	P
1944–1945	Auckland Pākēha	2	1	0	0	3
1945–49	Auckland	5	0	0	0	0
1946–52	New Zealand	14	4	0	0	12
1950–52	Waikato
1953	American All Stars

Coaching information
Representative
Years	Team	Gms	W	D	L	W%
1956	NZ Māori
1959–60	New Zealand	8	4	0	4	50

Travers Harry Hardwick (13 March 1923 – 25 April 1979) was a New Zealand rugby union and professional rugby league footballer who played representative rugby league (RL) for New Zealand and coached them in the 1960 World Cup.

== Early years ==
Hardwick originally played rugby union in the Wairarapa before taking up rugby league when he moved to Auckland.

== Playing career ==
Hardwick played for Ponsonby in the Auckland Rugby League competition. He first represented Auckland in 1945.

Hardwick was selected for New Zealand in 1946 and went on to play in fourteen Test matches between 1946 and 1952. He also captained the Kiwis. In 1950 Hardwick moved south, joining the Ngaruawahia Panthers in the Waikato Rugby League and represented Waikato.

Hardwick assisted the touring American All Stars team in 1953 due to their injury crises.

== Coaching career ==
Hardwick coached the New Zealand Māori in 1956.

He coached New Zealand for two years, in 1959 and 1960. This included the 1960 World Cup. He also served as a New Zealand selector between 1971 and 1975.

He was an Auckland selector in 1973.

Hardwick was inducted into the New Zealand Rugby League's Legends of League in 2000.
