= West Coast rugby league team =

Rugby league team in New Zealand

Club information
- Nickname: Chargers
- Colours: Red and White
- Founded: 1915

Current details
- Ground: Wingham Park
- Competition: New Zealand Rugby League

Records
- Rugby League Cup: 1947, 1955, 1960, 1962-63, 1968

The West Coast rugby league team are New Zealand rugby league team that represents the West Coast Rugby League. They have been nicknamed the Chargers.

== History ==
The West Coast side played its first match against Canterbury, losing 30–16 on 3 June 1915 at Victoria Park, Greymouth. That night the West Coast Rugby League was formed. Canterbury then played Blackball the next day, winning 23-10 before defeating Hokitika 33–8 on 5 June.

The team for the West Coast was; H. Lawrence, L. Smith, L. Hunter, A. Hobson, W. Kirk, Hay, R. Watts, J. Rear, S.Bligh, A. Kells, D. McCann, T. Todd, J. Stenhouse.

They next played in 1919 when they lost to Canterbury 5–3.

The West Coast recorded their first win in 1923 when they defeated Wellington 12–6. They first defeated Canterbury in 1931, winning 37–19, before following it up the following year with a 53–26 win.

Since then rugby league has traditionally been the most successful team sport in the West Coast. However, since the 1990s the West Coast has usually participated in Second Division or South Island competitions and in particular the West Coast missed out on having a team in either the Lion Red Cup or Bartercard Cup, the two main New Zealand Rugby League competitions of the 1990s and 2000s.

Despite this, the West Coast has had some success in recent years. In the 1995 season the West Coast won the South Island division of the National Provincial competition and advanced to the final, losing to Wellington. The NPC was that year an invitational competition due to the Lion Red Cup.

However, in 1997 the West Coast Chargers advanced to the semi-finals of a full national competition, losing to Canterbury 24–40 in an away semi final.

In 2000 the West Coast competed in the Mainland Super 10, a competition involving three South Island districts and seven Canterbury Rugby League clubs. The West Coast Chargers performed below expectations and finished eighth. The West Coast declined to take part in the 2001 edition of the competition after it was moved to the first half of the season.

In 2004 the West Coast played the touring Russian national team.

The West Coast is currently represented by the South Island team in the National Zonal Competition.

=== Notable players ===
The West Coast has produced many New Zealand national rugby league team including Jock Butterfield, Bill McLennan, George Menzies, Whetu Taewa and Kiwis coach Cecil Mountford.

== Rugby League Tour Matches ==
For 70 years from 1920 to 1990, the West Coast was a frequent stop for touring international rugby league teams.

Game	Date	Result	Venue	Attendance	Notes
1	11 August 1920	Northern Union def. West Coast 55–13	Victoria Park, Greymouth	1,500	1920 Great Britain Lions tour
2	13 August 1924	England def. West Coast 65–8	Victoria Park, Greymouth	3,000	1924 Great Britain Lions tour
3	23 September 1925	Queensland Firsts def. West Coast 27–10	Victoria Park, Greymouth		1925 Queensland tour of New Zealand
4	16 August 1928	England def. West Coast 62–13	Victoria Park, Greymouth	4,000	1928 Great Britain Lions tour
5	10 August 1932	England def. West Coast 32–8	Victoria Park, Greymouth	3,000	1932 Great Britain Lions tour
6	29 July 1946	West Coast def. England 17–8	Victoria Park, Greymouth	4,000	1946 Great Britain Lions tour
7	21 September 1949	Australia def. West Coast 39–14	Victoria Park, Greymouth	3,646	1949 Kangaroo tour of New Zealand
8	30 July 1950	Great Britain def. West Coast 21–15	Victoria Park, Greymouth	5,500	1950 Great Britain Lions tour
9	25 July 1951	France def. West Coast 5–2	Wingham Park, Greymouth	3,667	1951 French tour of Australasia
10	24 June 1953	Australia def. West Coast 17–11	Wingham Park, Greymouth	2,003	1953 Kangaroo tour of New Zealand
11	28 June 1953	West Coast def. USA 27–10	Wingham Park, Greymouth		1953 American All-Stars tour
12	27 July 1955	France def. West Coast 18–12	Wingham Park, Greymouth	5,000	1955 French tour of Australasia
13	3 August 1958	Great Britain def. West Coast 19–2	Wingham Park, Greymouth	4,500	1958 Great Britain Lions tour
14	31 July 1960	France def. West Coast 29–5	Greymouth Recreation Ground, Greymouth	4,500	1960 French tour of Australasia
15	25 June 1961	Australia def. West Coast 27–7	Wingham Park, Greymouth	2,125	1961 Kangaroo tour of New Zealand
16	5 August 1962	Great Britain def. West Coast 66–8	Wingham Park, Greymouth	2,758	1962 Great Britain Lions tour
17	4 August 1964	France def. West Coast 9–6	Wingham Park, Greymouth	1,970	1964 French tour of Australasia
18	13 July 1965	Australia def. West Coast 16–6	Wingham Park, Greymouth	1,682	1965 Kangaroo tour of New Zealand
19	11 August 1966	Great Britain def. West Coast 27–5	Wingham Park, Greymouth	2,212	1966 Great Britain Lions tour
20	16 May 1967	West Coast drew with Queensland Firsts 8–8	Wingham Park, Greymouth		1967 Queensland tour of New Zealand
21	21 July 1970	Great Britain def. West Coast 57–2	Wingham Park, Greymouth	676	1970 Great Britain Lions tour
22	21 June 1975	Wales def. West Coast 35–5	Wingham Park, Greymouth	2,000	Wales 1975 Rugby League World Cup tour
23	7 August 1979	Great Britain def. West Coast 19–0	Wingham Park, Greymouth	900	1979 Great Britain Lions tour
24	26 June 1991	France def. West Coast 14–6	Wingham Park, Greymouth		1991 French tour of Australasia
