= 1958 New Zealand rugby league season =

Seasons
- 1957 1959

The 1958 New Zealand rugby league season was the 51st season of rugby league that had been played in New Zealand.

== International competitions ==
New Zealand drew 1-all with Great Britain, winning 15–10 in the first Test before going down 32–15. The squad included; Cyril Eastlake, Tom Hadfield, Reese Griffiths, George P Turner, Neville Denton, George Menzies, Keith Roberts, Joe Ratima, Jock Butterfield, Henry Maxwell, captain Cliff Johnson, Trevor Kilkelly and Rex Percy.

Canterbury lost to Great Britain 41–21. The final match of the tour saw Great Britain defeat Auckland 24–17. The match was refereed by Vic Belsham. Selected by Maurie Robertson, Des Barchard and Des White, Auckland included; Ron McKay, Vern Bakalich, Neville Denton, Bill Sorensen, Ray Webber, Cyril Eastlake, Len Eriksen, Joe Ratima, Jim Patterson, Cliff Johnson, John Yates, Keith Bell and Ian Grey.

The Manly-Warringah Sea Eagles toured the country at the end of the season, defeating Canterbury 27-5 and the West Coast 36-5 before heading to Auckland. Manly defeated Otahuhu 42-12 before losing a mid-week game to Ellerslie 16–15. They then defeated the Auckland Rugby League champion Ponsonby Ponies 18-5 before beating an "All Stars" selection, consisting of current and former Kiwis, 26–10.

== National competitions ==
=== Northern Union Cup ===
Auckland again held the Northern Union Cup at the end of the season.

=== Inter-island competition ===
The South Island defeated the North Island 25–15 at the Show Grounds.

The South Island included John Bond, George Menzies, Jock Butterfield, Trevor Kilkelly and Mel Cooke.

=== Inter-district competition ===
Auckland toured the South Island, defeating the West Coast 31-11 and Canterbury 36–15. The Auckland team was coached by Des White, managed by Lou Hutt and included; Jim Patterson, Bill Snowden, Dick Haggie, Rex Percy, Keith Bell, Alan Riechelmann, George Turner, Neville Denton, captain Henry Maxwell and vice-captain Tom Hadfield.

Canterbury included John and Jim Bond, Ean Anderson, captain Keith Roberts, Mel Cooke and Kevin Pearce.

== Club competitions ==
=== Auckland ===
Ponsonby won the Auckland Rugby League's Fox Memorial Trophy and Rukutai Shield. Marist won the Roope Rooster and defeated Ponsonby 29–22 to also claim the champion of champions Stormont Shield.

This was the first year the Auckland Rugby League used a playoff structure and Ponsonby defeated Otahuhu 16–7 in the inaugural grand final on 13 September. Refereed by Vic Belsham the teams were;
Ponsonby; Jack Fagan, Les Cherrie, Ron Smyth, captain Bill Sorensen, Rex Percy, Mal Barber, Len Eriksen, Arthur Tomlinson, Ted Johnson, Joe Ratima, Graham Keys, Graham Bint and Keith Bell. Otahuhu; Dick Haggie, Owen Wright, Joe Gibbons, Jack Te Kawa, Alan Sanderson, John Te Kawa, captain Joe Wright, John Yates, Allen Gore, Barry Giltrap, Simon Yates, Bill Hattaway and Joe Jujnovich.

Under the Auckland Rugby League's "district scheme", which lasted until 1963, Northcote and North Shore combined to form "Northern Districts" and City-Newton and Eastern Suburbs formed "Eastern City Districts".

Cyril Eastlake and Brian Campbell played for Ellerslie, Ron Ackland played for Eastern City Districts and Don Hammond played for Mount Albert. Northern Districts were coached by Scotty McClymont. Neville Denton, Ron McKay, Sam Edwards and Alan Riechelmann played for Marist, as did Brian Reidy who made his senior debut during the season.

=== Wellington ===
St George won the Wellington Rugby League's Appleton Shield.

=== Canterbury ===
Hornby won the Canterbury Rugby League's Massetti Cup.

=== Other Competitions ===
Jock Butterfield was the captain-coach of Brunner in the West Coast Rugby League competition. Brunner won the Thacker Shield that year, defeating Hornby 14–8.
