= 1955 New Zealand rugby league season =

Seasons
- ← 1955 1956 →

The 1955 New Zealand rugby league season was the 48th season of rugby league that had been played in New Zealand.

== International competitions ==
New Zealand drew a series against France, 1-all. The New Zealand side for the Test series included; Roy Moore, Bob Hawes, Ron McKay, captain Tommy Baxter, Bruce Robertson, Bill Sorensen, Pat Creedy, Cliff Johnson, Lory Blanchard, Bill McLennan, George McDonald, Jock Butterfield, Alister Atkinson, Jim Riddell and George Menzies.

Canterbury defeated the touring French side 24–12, while Auckland defeated France 17–15. Auckland included Dick Haggie, Vern Bakalich, captain Tommy Baxter, Cyril Eastlake, Royce Craike, Bill Sorensen, Sel Belsham, Joe Ratima, Arch McInteer, Henry Maxwell, Jim Riddell, Keith Bell and Ian Grey. France defeated the West Coast 18–12, Wellington 19–14, Taranaki 46-17 but lost to the New Zealand Māori 28–20.

New Zealand then toured Great Britain and France, losing both Test series 1–2. The team was coached by Harold Tetley and included; Roy Moore, captain Tommy Baxter, Bruce Robertson, Bill Sorensen, Vern Bakalich, Pat Creedy, Bill McLennan, Trevor Kilkelly, Henry Maxwell, Ian Grey, Alister Atkinson, George McDonald, Dick Haggie, Bob Hawes, Ron McKay, Keith Roberts, Les McNicol, Lory Blanchard, John Bond, Jock Butterfield, Sel Belsham, Rex Percy, Jim Riddell and George Menzies. Cliff Johnson was originally selected but withdrew and was replaced by Maxwell. Vern Bakalich scored a then record twenty six tries while on tour. The Kiwis were so ravaged by injuries that they only had twelve fully fit players available for the final Test against France.

== National competitions ==
=== Northern Union Cup ===
Auckland again held the Northern Union Cup at the end of the season. During the season the West Coast also held the trophy.

=== Inter-island competition ===
The South Island included Pat Creedy at halfback.

=== Inter-district competition ===
Canterbury hosted two teams during Queen's Birthday weekend; they defeated Wellington 14–5 on the Saturday and the West Coast 17–15 on the Monday. Both games were played at the Show Grounds. Later in the season they drew 18-all with Auckland at Carlaw Park in June and lost 8–19 to the West Coast in a Northern Union Cup challenge at Wingham Park. Auckland also hosted the West Coast at Carlaw Park, drawing 19-all in May.

Auckland included Bill Sorensen, Ron McKay and Ian Grey. Canterbury included Trevor Kilkelly, Lory Blanchard, Jock Butterfield, John Bond, Pat Creedy, Keith Roberts and Alister Atkinson. The West Coast included George Menzies and Bill McLennan.

== Club competitions ==
=== Auckland ===
Richmond won the Auckland Rugby League's Fox Memorial Trophy. They shared the Rukutai Shield with North Shore. Ellerslie won the Roope Rooster and Stormont Shield.

The Te Atatu Roosters were founded in 1955.

=== Wellington ===
St George won the Wellington Rugby League's Appleton Shield.

=== Canterbury ===
Sydenham won the Canterbury Rugby League's Massetti Cup.

Jock Butterfield played for Sydenham.

=== Other Competitions ===
Sydenham defeated Greymouth Marist 22–13 to win the Thacker Shield.
