= 1957 Rugby League World Cup squads =

This page list all the four squads which took part to the 1957 Rugby League World Cup.

== Team photos ==
The Rugby League News published team photos of each country: Australia, France, Great Britain and New Zealand

== Australia ==
Dick Poole was appointed Captain/Coach of the Australian team. Norman 'Latchem' Robinson was team manager.
The squad was selected from four interstate matches played on 22, 25 May, June 4th and 8th, all of which were comfortably won by New South Wales (margins of 38, 17, 64 and 33). A second trial match was played on 8 June, between Metropolitan and Northern teams, from which Barnes, McCaffery and Schofield were selected in Australia's World Cup squad.
Carlson, Davies, Watson and the unused Tyquin were selected from Queensland clubs. Hawick and Schofield were selected from clubs in New South Wales Country areas. The balance of the squad were playing for Sydney-based clubs during the 1957 season.
Brian Carlson's contract as captain-coach of Blackall was terminated by that club due to his decision to participate in the World Cup tournament.

Player	Position	Age	Weight st.lb (kg)	Club	Games	Tries	Goals	FG	Points
Keith Barnes	Fullback	22	11.7 (73)	Balmain	1	0	5	0	10
Brian Carlson	Utility Back	24	13.2 (83)	Blackall	3	2	11	0	28
Brian Clay	Five-eighth, Lock	23	13.6 (85)	St George	3	1	0	0	3
Brian Davies	Prop	27	15.0 (95)	Brisbane Brothers	3	0	1	0	2
Greg Hawick	Five-eighth	25	13.6 (85)	Wagga Kangaroos	1	0	0	0	0
Keith Holman	Halfback	31	11.9 (74)	Western Suburbs	1	0	0	0	0
Ken Kearney	Hooker	33	14.0 (89)	St George	3	0	0	0	0
Bill Marsh	Prop	28	15.3 (97)	Balmain	3	1	0	0	3
Ken McCaffery	Halfback	28	13.0 (83)	North Sydney	2	2	0	0	6
Ian Moir	Wing	24	11.7 (73)	South Sydney	3	3	0	0	9
Kel O'Shea	Second-row	23	15.0 (95)	Western Suburbs	3	3	0	0	9
Dick Poole	Centre	26	13.2 (83)	Newtown	3	1	0	0	3
Norm Provan	Second-row	24	15.6 (98)	St George	3	1	0	0	3
Don Schofield	Lock	26	13.10 (87)	Muswellbrook	2	0	0	0	0
Alex Watson	Wing	25	13.10 (87)	Brisbane Western Suburbs	2	0	0	0	0
Harry Wells	Centre	25	14.0 (89)	Western Suburbs	3	2	0	0	6

Squad members who did not play in the tournament.

Player	Position	Age	Weight st.lb (kg)	Club
Ray Ritchie	Wing	20	12.0 (76)	Manly-Warringah
Tom Tyquin	Second-row	24	14.6 (92)	South Brisbane

== France ==
The French team was coached by Jean Duhau and René Duffort and managed by Antoine Blain.

The Rugby League News included team lists for the matches against Great Britain and Australia.

At the conclusion of the tournament France played a match against Southern New South Wales in Wagga. They subsequently played a three match series against Great Britain in South Africa.

The French squad was:

Player	Position	Age	Club	Games	Tries	Goals	FG	Points
Antranick Apellian	Hooker	27	Marseille XIII	3	0	0	0	0
Gilbert Benausse	Five-eighth	25	AS Carcassonne	3	1	8	0	19
Gabriel Berthomieu	Prop, Second-row	33	Racing Club Albi XIII	4	0	0	0	0
Henri Delhoste	Prop	25	XIII Catalan	1	0	0	0	0
René Ferrero	Prop	30	Marseille XIII	3	0	0	0	0
Jean Foussat	Wing, Centre	25	Villeneuve XIII RLLG	2	2	0	0	6
Guy Husson	Wing	25	Racing Club Albi XIII	3	0	0	0	0
René Jean	Halfback	26	Sporting Olympique Avignon	3	0	0	0	0
Antoine Jimenez	Centre	28	Villeneuve XIII RLLG	2	0	0	0	0
Francis Lévy	Lock	26	XIII Catalan	2	0	0	0	0
Robert Médus	Prop, Second-row	28	XIII Catalan	2	0	0	0	0
Jacques Merquey	Centre	27	Sporting Olympique Avignon	2	1	0	0	3
Augustin Parent	Second-row	21	Sporting Olympique Avignon	2	0	0	0	0
André Rives	Fullback	33	Racing Club Albi XIII	3	0	0	0	0
Jean Rouqueirol	Lock	24	Sporting Olympique Avignon	1	0	0	0	0
Armand Save	Second-row	25	Saint-Gaudens	1	0	0	0	0
Gilbert Verdié	Wing	28	Racing Club Albi XIII	1	0	0	0	0
Maurice Voron	Wing, Centre	28	Lyon Villeurbanne	3	0	0	0	0

== Great Britain ==
The team was managed by Bill Fallowfield and Hector Elsworth Rawson, but no coach was appointed. The team was captained by Alan Prescott, with Phil Jackson as vice-captain.

The Rugby League News published details of the touring team including each player's occupation, age, height and weight. The same Sydney-based match-day program publication included team lists for the matches against France and New Zealand.
English representative Phil Jackson was born in Canada. Boston, Harris, Jones, Moses and Price were representatives from Wales, and Tom McKinney from Northern Ireland.
Prior to the commencement of the tournament, Great Britain played a match against Western Australia in Perth.

Player	Position	Age	Weight st.lb (kg)	Club	Games	Tries	Goals	FG	Points
Eric Ashton	Wing, Centre	22	13.6 (85 kg)	Wigan	2	0	0	0	0
Billy Boston	Wing	22	14.8 (93 kg)	Wigan	2	1	0	0	3
Alan Davies	Centre	24	13.6 (85 kg)	Oldham	2	0	0	0	0
Jack Grundy	Second-row	30	14.9 (93 kg)	Barrow	3	1	0	0	3
Geoff Gunney	Second-row	23	14.10 (93 kg)	Hunslet	2	0	0	0	0
Tommy Harris	Hooker	30	13.0 (83 kg)	Hull	2	0	0	0	0
Phil Jackson (vc)	Centre	24	14.3 (90 kg)	Barrow	2	2	0	0	6
Lewis Jones	Centre	26	12.0 (76 kg)	Leeds	3	1	10	0	23
Sid Little	Prop	25	14.8 (93 kg)	Oldham	3	1	0	0	3
Tom McKinney	Hooker	30	14.7 (92 kg)	St Helens	1	0	0	0	0
Glyn Moses	Fullback	29	13.0 (83 kg)	St Helens	3	0	0	0	0
Alan Prescott (c)	Prop	30	16.0 (102 kg)	St Helens	3	0	0	0	0
Austin Rhodes	Five-eighth, Halfback	20	11.6 (73 kg)	St Helens	1	0	0	0	0
Jeff Stevenson	Halfback	25	9.10 (62 kg)	Leeds	3	1	0	0	3
Mick Sullivan	Wing	23	11.9 (74 kg)	Huddersfield	3	3	0	0	9
Derek Turner	Lock	24	13.6 (85 kg)	Oldham	3	0	0	0	0
Johnny Whiteley	Lock	26	14.8 (93 kg)	Hull	1	0	0	0	0

The following player was selected in the squad but did not play in the tournament.

Player	Position	Age	Weight st.lb (kg)	Club
Raymond Price	Five-eighth	33	11.12 (75 kg)	Warrington

== New Zealand ==
The team was coached by Bill Telford (Auckland), with Keith Blow (Canterbury) as manager.

The Rugby League News published details of the touring team including each player's occupation, age, height and weight. The same publication included team lists for the match against Great Britain.

Player	Position	Age	Weight st.lb (kg)	Region	Games	Tries	Goals	FG	Points
Ron Ackland	Centre	22	13. 13 (88)	Auckland	1	0	0	0	0
Vern Bakalich	Wing	27	11. 7 (73)	Auckland	2	0	0	0	0
Sel Belsham	Halfback	22	13. 2 (83)	Auckland	3	0	0	0	0
Jock Butterfield	Hooker	25	14. 5 (91)	Canterbury	3	0	0	0	0
Pat Creedy	Fullback	29	12. 0 (76)	Canterbury	3	0	1	0	2
Reese Griffiths	Wing	19	12. 7 (79)	West Coast	1	0	0	0	0
Tom Hadfield	Wing	22	12. 7 (79)	Auckland	3	2	0	0	6
Cliff Johnson (c)	Second-row	28	15. 8 (99)	Auckland	3	1	0	0	3
Henry Maxwell	Prop	25	16. 2 (103)	Auckland	3	0	0	0	0
Bill McLennan	Prop	29	15. 10 (100)	West Coast	2	1	0	0	3
George Menzies (vc)	Five-eighth	26	11. 4 (72)	West Coast	3	1	0	0	3
Kevin Pearce	Second-row	21	13. 8 (86)	Canterbury	1	0	0	0	0
Rex Percy	Lock	23	13. 7 (86)	Auckland	1	0	0	0	0
Jim Riddell	Second-row	27	13. 8 (86)	Auckland	2	1	0	0	3
Bill Sorensen	Centre	25	13. 6 (85)	Auckland	3	1	9	0	21
George Turner	Centre	25	11. 11 (75)	Auckland	2	1	0	0	3
John Yates	Second-row	26	15. 10 (100)	Auckland	3	0	0	0	0

The following selected players did not play in the tournament.

Player	Position	Age	Weight st.lb (kg)	Province
Keith Bell	Utility Back	22	13. 2 (83)	Auckland
Neville Denton	Wing			Auckland
