= 1957 New Zealand rugby league season =

Seasons
- ← 1956 1958 →

The 1957 New Zealand rugby league season was the 50th season of rugby league that had been played in New Zealand.

== International competitions ==
New Zealand attended the 1957 World Cup, defeating Great Britain but losing to France and Australia. The Kiwis then lost a match against a combined Great Britain/France XIII. The team was coached by Bill Telford and consisted of Pat Creedy, Vern Bakalich, Neville Denton, Tom Hadfield, Ron Ackland, Bill Sorensen, George P Turner, vice-captain George Menzies, Sel Belsham, Jock Butterfield, Bill McLennan, Henry Maxwell, captain Cliff Johnson, Kevin Pearce, Jim Riddell, John Yates, Rex Percy and Keith Bell.

An Auckland junior team toured Australia, winning matches against Illawarra, Western Suburbs and twice beating Eastern Suburbs. The squad included future Kiwis Brian Reidy, who captained the squad, and Gary Phillips.

== National competitions ==
=== Northern Union Cup ===
Auckland again held the Northern Union Cup at the end of the season.

=== Inter-district competition ===
Canterbury and the West Coast drew in Greymouth.

== Club competitions ==
=== Auckland ===
Ellerslie won the Auckland Rugby League's Fox Memorial Trophy. They shared the Rukutai Shield with City Newton. Otahuhu won the Roope Rooster.

The first University of Auckland rugby league club was founded in 1957. Affiliated to the Ellerslie club, the university side included Murray Paterson.

=== Wellington ===
St George won the Wellington Rugby League's Appleton Shield.

=== Canterbury ===
Papanui won the Canterbury Rugby League's Massetti Cup.

The Canterbury Rugby League experimented with a "sin bin" until the New Zealand Rugby League instructed them to return to International rules. The sin bin is now a permanent feature of the rugby league rules.

The Rugby League finally sold Monica Park during the season.

Kaiapoi registered with the Rugby League.

Jock Butterfield played for Sydenham.

=== Other competitions ===
The Manawatu Rugby League was formed in February with six clubs; Takaro, Kiwi, Celtic, Kia Ora, Marton and Feilding. Ex-Australian international Noel Pidding played for the Marton club. Feilding won the first ever Championship title defeating Takaro.

Runanga defeated Papanui 19–17 to win the Thacker Shield.
