= 1956 New Zealand rugby league tour of Australia =

- Manager: Ron McGregor
- Coach(es): Bill Telford
- Tour captain(s): Tommy Baxter
- Top point scorer(s): Des White 88
- Top try scorer(s): Rex Percy 12
- Top test point scorer(s): Des White 10; Don Adams 15
- Top test try scorer(s): Vern Bakalich 2 Don Adams 5
Summary
P	W	D	L
Total
15	9	0	6
Test match
3	0	0	3
Opponent
P	W	D	L
Australia
3	0	0	3

Tour chronology
- Previous tour: 1952 by to 1955 by 1955-56 to
- Next tour: 1956 by to 1958 by to 1959 by to

The 1956 New Zealand rugby league tour of Australia was the eighteenth tour by New Zealand's national rugby league team, and the thirteenth tour to visit Australia. The fifteen-match tour included three Test Matches.
The touring team began with a pair of wins but then lost the next two, against Newcastle and the First Test in Sydney. Five strong performances in Queensland followed, with wins by wide margins in high-scoring matches. In contrast, the Second Test was a low-scoring match, Australia winning 8 to 2 to secure their first Trans-Tasman series win since 1935. New Zealand lost the Third Test, and thus the series three-nil, and also the two tour matches that followed.

== Leadership ==
The team was captained by Tommy Baxter.

The touring team was managed by Ron McGregor.

== Squad ==
The Rugby League News published a Team Photo, Player Details (Occupation, Age, Height and Weight) and pen portraits of the tourists: Backs and Forwards which listed their provincial team.

Player	Pos.	Age (Note: Age as given in the ‘’Rugby League News’’ for the first match against New South Wales)	Weight	Province	Tests on Tour	Games	Tries	Goals	FG	Points
Ron Ackland	Centre	21	13. 4 (84)	Auckland	0	4	4	0	0	12
Vern Bakalich	Wing	26	12. 2 (77)	Auckland	3	7	7	0	0	21
Tommy Baxter	Centre	26	12. 12 (82)	Auckland	2	9	1	0	0	3
Sel Belsham	Halfback	25	11. 2 (71)	Auckland	3	9	1	0	0	3
John Bond	Prop, Second-row	24	14. 8 (93)	Canterbury	0	6	2	0	0	6
Ossie Butt	Prop, Second-row	22	14. 4 (91)	Wellington	0	5	0	0	0	0
Jock Butterfield	Hooker, Second-row	24	14. 0 (89)	Canterbury	3	10	1	0	0	3
Pat Creedy	Fullback	28	12. 5 (78)	Canterbury	0	3	1	4	0	11
Cyril Eastlake	Utility Back	25	11. 7 (73)	Auckland	3	11	2	6	0	18
Arnold Green	Wing, Centre	22	10. 11 (68)	West Coast	0	7	7	0	0	21
Reese Griffiths	Wing, Centre	18	12. 3 (78)	West Coast	0	7	4	0	0	12
Tom Hadfield	Wing, Centre	21	12. 0 (76)	Auckland	1	8	4	0	0	12
Cliff Johnson	Second-row	27	15. 2 (96)	Auckland	3	8	1	0	0	3
John Lasher	Hooker	23	12. 12 (82)	Auckland	0	7	3	0	0	9
Duncan MacRae	Prop	22	15. 4 (97)	Auckland	3	9	0	0	0	0
Henry Maxwell	Prop	24	15. 10 (100)	Auckland	3	10	3	0	0	9
George Menzies	Five-eighth	25	11. 5 (72)	West Coast	3	9	2	0	0	6
Gordon Moncur	Wing	23	11. 2 (71)	Auckland	0	6	1	0	0	3
Frank Mulcare	Lock	27	13. 0 (83)	West Coast	3	7	3	0	0	9
Mauriohooho Murray	Second-row	23	14. 5 (91)	Auckland	0	8	3	0	0	9
Rex Percy	Lock	22	13. 7 (86)	Auckland	0	8	12	0	0	36
Jim Riddell	Second-row	26	13. 8 (86)	Auckland	3	9	0	0	0	0
Keith Roberts	Halfback	24	11. 12 (75)	Canterbury	0	5	5	0	0	15
Bill Sorensen	Five-eighth, Centre	24	13. 4 (84)	Auckland	3	12	10	5	0	40
Des White	Fullback	29	11. 13 (76)	Auckland	3	10	0	44	0	88
John Yates	Prop, Second-row	25	15. 2 (96)	Auckland	0	4	1	0	0	3

== Matches ==
May 30	Western Division	16–19	New Zealand	Lithgow
	Tries: 2 Laurie Bennett; Alex Whitby; Goals: 5 Barry Russell (5)	[ Result Report]	Tries: 5 Vern Bakalich (2); Ron Ackland; Jock Butterfield; Frank Mulcare; Goals: 2 Pat Creedy (2)	Attendance: 6,620; Gate: AU£ 1,062; Referee: Eric McIlhatton

Team list:

Western NSW: FB: Barry Russell (age 22), WG: William Miller (23) ( Parkes), CE: Ray Quinnell (23), CE: Alex Whitby (23), WG: Joseph Cohen (23), FE: Jack McIntosh (25), HB: William Roberts (26) (Orange), LK: John Gain (23) ( Parkes), SR: Jack Perrin (24) ( Parkes), SR: Patrick Weldon (21) (Orange), PR: Hilton Bonham (20) (Bathurst), HK: John Kelly (24), PR: Laurie Bennett (26) (Lithgow).
Ken Van Heekeren (24) and Frank Border (27) were selected as reserves, but did not play.
New Zealand: FB: Pat Creedy, WG: Vern Bakalich, CE: Ron Ackland, CE: Cyril Eastlake, WG: Reese Griffiths, FE: George Menzies, HB: Sel Belsham, LK: Frank Mulcare, SR: Jim Riddell, SR: Cliff Johnson, PR: John Bond, HK: Jock Butterfield, PR: John Yates.

June 2	New South Wales	17–26	New Zealand	Sydney Cricket Ground
	Tries: 3 Don Adams; Graham Laird; Peter O'Connor; Goals: 4 Ron Willey (4)	[Program; Database Report]	Tries: 4 Bill Sorensen (3); Frank Mulcare; Goals: 7 Des White (7)	Attendance: 35,492; Gate: AU£ 5,008; Referee: C. Brown

Team list:

New South Wales: FB: Ron Willey (age 28) ( Manly), WG: Ross Kite (24) ( St George), CE: Dick Poole (25) ( Newtown), CE: Tony Paskins (27) ( Easts), WG: Don Adams (22) ( Maitland), FE: Graham Laird (22) ( Parramatta), HB: Col Donohoe (26) ( Souths), LK: Peter O'Connor (25) ( Young), SR: Don Schofield (25) ( Cessnock), SR: Henry Holloway (25) ( Newtown), PR: Roy Bull (26) ( Manly), HK: Ken Kearney (30) ( St George), PR: Les Hampson (22) ( Newtown).
Bryan Orrock (25) ( St George) and Keith Holman (28) ( Wests) were selected as reserves but did not play.
New Zealand: FB: Des White, WG: Vern Bakalich, CE: Bill Sorensen, CE: Tommy Baxter, WG: Cyril Eastlake, FE: George Menzies, HB: Sel Belsham, LK: Frank Mulcare, SR: Cliff Johnson, SR: Jim Riddell, PR: Duncan MacRae, HK: Jock Butterfield, PR: Henry Maxwell.

June 4	Newcastle	20–5	New Zealand	Newcastle Sports Ground
	Tries: 4 Fred Brown; Doug Hawke; Don Adams; Brian Carlson; Goals: 4 Russ Naughton (4)	[ Result Report]	Tries: 1 Henry Maxwell; Goals: 1 Des White	Attendance: 12,500; Gate: AU£ 2,247; Referee: G. Hallwood

Team list:

Newcastle: FB: Russ Naughton ( Lakes United), WG: Don Adams ( Maitland), CE: J. Fitzpatrick, CE: Neil McDonnell ( Lakes United), WG: Brian Carlson ( Souths), FE: Warren Foley ( Waratah Mayfield), HB: Bobby Banks ( Waratah Mayfield), LK: Bill Smith ( Waratah Mayfield), SR: Kurri Chapple ( Kurri), SR: Don Schofield ( Cessnock), PR: Doug Hawke ( Norths), HK: Ken Fogarty ( Maitland), PR: Fred Brown ( Maitland).
New Zealand: FB: Des White, WG: Gordon Moncur, CE: Tommy Baxter, CE: Tom Hadfield, WG: Arnold Green, FE: Bill Sorensen, HB: Pat Creedy, LK: Rex Percy, SR: John Yates, SR: Duncan MacRae, PR: Mauriohooho Murray, HK: John Lasher, PR: Henry Maxwell.

=== 1st Test ===
June 9
2.30pm

Australia	12–9	New Zealand
Tries: 4 Don Adams (2); Dick Poole; Ian Moir; Goals: 0	Program; Result; Database	Tries: 3 Sel Belsham; Vern Bakalich; Bill Sorensen; Goals: 0

Sydney Cricket Ground
Attendance: 46,766
Gate: AU£ 15,905
Referee: John Casey

Team list:

Australia: FB: Ken McCrohon (23) ( Brisbane Western Suburbs), WG: Don Adams ( Maitland), CE: Alex Watson (23) ( Brisbane Western Suburbs), CE: Dick Poole (25) ( Newtown), WG: Ian Moir (24) ( South Sydney), FE: Cyril Connell Jr (26) ( North Rockhampton), HB: Keith Holman (28) ( Western Suburbs), LK: Ian Doyle (24) ( Toowoomba All Whites), SR: Ignatius Tyquin (23) ( South Brisbane), SR: Kel O'Shea (22) ( Western Suburbs), PR: Roy Bull (26) ( Manly-Warringah), HK: Ken Kearney (30) ( St George), PR: Brian Davies (25) ( Brisbane Brothers).
Tom Payne (21) ( Toowoomba All Whites) and Don Furner (23) ( Toowoomba Souths) were selected as reserves but did not play.
Brian Carlson (23) ( South Newcastle) was selected for this match but withdrew.
New Zealand: FB: Des White, WG: Vern Bakalich, CE: Tommy Baxter, CE: Bill Sorensen, WG: Cyril Eastlake, FE: George Menzies, HB: Sel Belsham, LK: Frank Mulcare, SR: Cliff Johnson, SR: Jim Riddell, PR: Duncan MacRae, HK: Jock Butterfield, PR: Henry Maxwell.

June 11	Brisbane	8–26	New Zealand	Brisbane Exhibition Ground
Night game	Tries: 2 J. Duncan (2); Goals: 1 Brian Davies	[ Result Report]	Tries: 6 Bill Sorensen; Tom Hadfield; Cyril Eastlake; John Yates; Arnold Green; Pat Creedy; Goals: 4 Bill Sorensen (2); Pat Creedy (2)	Attendance: 14,367; Gate: AU£ 2,020; Referee: John Casey

Team list:

Brisbane: FB: Ken McCrohon ( Wests), WG: B. Pryor ( Souths), CE: J. Mulgrew ( Valleys), CE: Norm Pope ( Valleys), WG: Bill Monkland ( Wests), FE: Norm Reynolds ( Wests), HB: Darcy Ryan ( Wests), LK: John Bruton ( Brothers), SR: J. Duncan ( Brothers), SR: Tom Tyquin ( Souths), PR: Brian. Davies ( Brothers), HK: Alan Hornery ( Wests), PR: Norm McFadden ( Valleys).
New Zealand: FB: Pat Creedy, WG: Ron Ackland, CE: Bill Sorensen, CE: Arnold Green, WG: Tom Hadfield, FE: Cyril Eastlake, HB: Sel Belsham, LK: Frank Mulcare, SR: John Yates, SR: Jim Riddell, PR: Mauriohooho Murray, HK: John Lasher, PR: John Bond.

June 13	Toowoomba	25–33	New Zealand	Toowoomba
	Tries: 5 Leo Johnson; Athol Halpin; Des McGovern; Tom Payne; Bob Buckley; Goals: 5 Don Furner (5)	[ Result Report]	Tries: 7 Rex Percy (2); Ron Ackland (2); Tom Hadfield; Bill Sorensen; Henry Maxwell; Goals: 6 Des White (6)	Attendance: 6,142; Gate: AU£ 1,327; Referee: Frank Ballard

Team list:

Toowoomba: FB: Athol Halpin ( All Whites), WG: Des McGovern (age 28) ( All Whites), CE: Tom Payne (21) ( All Whites), CE: Les Hardy ( Souths), WG: Bob Buckley ( All Whites), FE: H. Walker ( Souths), HB: Sammy Hunter (25) ( Souths), LK: Ian Doyle (24) ( All Whites), SR: Jim Payne (19) ( All Whites), SR: Don Furner (23) ( Souths), PR: Ron Proudfoot (22) ( Newtown), HK: Leo Johnson ( Newtown), PR: Kev Boshammer ( All Whites), Coach: Duncan Thompson (Toowoomba).
New Zealand: FB: Des White, WG: Ron Ackland, CE: Tom Hadfield, CE: Bill Sorensen, WG: Gordon Moncur, FE: Cyril Eastlake, HB: Sel Belsham, LK: Rex Percy, SR: Cliff Johnson, SR: John Yates, PR: Henry Maxwell, HK: Jock Butterfield, PR: Duncan MacRae.

June 16	Queensland	26–40	New Zealand	Brisbane
	Tries: 6 Des McGovern; Alex Watson; Bob Buckley; Tom Tyquin; Don Furner; Gary Parcell; Goals: 4 Cyril Connell Jr (3); Don Furner	[ Database Report]	Tries: 8 George Menzies (2); Vern Bakalich; Tom Hadfield; Tommy Baxter; Frank Mulcare; Mauriohooho Murray; Ron Ackland; Goals: 8 Des White (8)	Attendance: 28,261; Gate: AU£ 4,138; Referee: John Casey

Team list:

Queensland: FB: Ken McCrohon (age 23) ( Wests), WG: Des McGovern (28) ( Toowoomba All Whites), CE: Alex Watson (23) ( Wests), CE: Tom Payne (21) ( Toowoomba All Whites), WG: Bob Buckley ( Toowoomba All Whites), FE: Cyril Connell Jr (26) ( North Rockhampton), HB: Sammy Hunter (25) ( Toowoomba Souths), LK: Tom Tyquin (23) ( Souths), SR: Gary Parcell ( Ipswich Brothers), SR: Don Furner (23) ( Toowoomba Souths), PR: Brian Davies (25) ( Brisbane Brothers), HK: Alan Hornery ( Wests), PR: Ron Proudfoot (22) ( Toowoomba Newtown).
New Zealand: FB: Des White, WG: Tom Hadfield, CE: Bill Sorensen, CE: Tommy Baxter, WG: Vern Bakalich, FE: George Menzies, HB: Sel Belsham, LK: Frank Mulcare, SR: Jim Riddell, SR: Cliff Johnson, PR: Henry Maxwell, HK: Jock Butterfield, PR: Duncan MacRae, RF: Mauriohooho Murray, RB: Ron Ackland.

June 17	Central Queensland	22–60	New Zealand	Rockhampton
	Tries: 6 G. Little (2); Allan Rycen; Ollie Smith; Bob Banks; P. Millroy; Goals: 2 Ken Jenkins (2)		Tries: 14; Rex Percy (6); Reese Griffiths (3); Vern Bakalich (2); Bill Sorensen; Tom Hadfield; Mauriohooho Murray; Goals: 9 Des White (9)	Attendance: 5,800; Gate: AU£ 1,451; Referee: N. Castley

Team list:

Central Queensland: FB: Ray Robinson ( Railways), WG: Allan Rycen ( Railways), CE: Ray Thomas ( Fitzroys), CE: G. Little ( Brothers), WG: Malcolm Spencer ( Railways), FE: Bob Banks ( Norths), HB: Ken Jenkins ( Norths), LK: Ollie Smith ( Brothers), SR: Nev Callaghan ( Fitzroys), SR: Pat Sear ( Norths), PR: C. Harkin ( Brothers), HK: P. Millroy ( Norths), PR: Brian Cridland ( Norths).
New Zealand: FB: Des White, WG: Vern Bakalich, CE: Tom Hadfield, CE: Tommy Baxter, WG: Reese Griffiths, FE: Bill Sorensen, HB: Keith Roberts, LK: Rex Percy, SR: Jock Butterfield, SR: Ossie Butt, PR: John Bond, HK: John Lasher, PR: Mauriohooho Murray.

June 20	North Queensland	8–53	New Zealand	Townsville
	Tries: 2 Danny Clifford; Ken Woodward; Goals: 1 Albert Roberts		Tries: 15; Keith Roberts (4); John Lasher (3); Arnold Green (2); Bill Sorensen (2); Gordon Moncur; Reese Griffiths; Henry Maxwell; Cyril Eastlake; Goals: 4 Bill Sorensen (3); Cyril Eastlake	Attendance: 4,000; Gate: AU£ 963; Referee: H. Gilbert

Team list:

North Queensland: FB: Bevan Hoyle (Townsville), WG: Albert Roberts (Townsville), CE: Len Blaik (Townsville), CE: Ron Tait ( Innisfail), WG: Morry Breen ( Innisfail), FE: Thorpe Scott (Townsville), HB: Ken Woodward (Cairns), LK: Hugh Kelly (age 23) (Cairns), SR: Danny Clifford (Tully), SR: Elton Rasmussen ( Mackay Magpies), PR: John Blankensee (Cairns), HK: Ron Griffiths (Cairns), PR: Ken Herbert (Townsville).
New Zealand: FB: Cyril Eastlake, WG: Gordon Moncur, CE: Reese Griffiths, CE: Tommy Baxter, WG: Arnold Green, FE: Bill Sorensen, HB: Keith Roberts, LK: Rex Percy, SR: Jock Butterfield, SR: Ossie Butt, PR: Duncan MacRae, HK: John Lasher, PR: Henry Maxwell.

=== 2nd Test ===
June 23

Australia	8–2	New Zealand
Tries: 2 Dick Poole; Alex Watson; Goals: 1 Gordon Clifford	Result; Database	Tries: 0 Goals: 1 Des White

Brisbane
Attendance: 28,361
Gate: AU£ 9,827
Referee: Darcy Lawler

Team list:

Australia: FB: Gordon Clifford ( Newtown), WG: Don Adams ( Maitland), CE: Dick Poole ( Newtown), CE: Alex Watson ( Brisbane Western Suburbs), WG: Des McGovern ( Toowoomba All Whites), FE: Cyril Connell Jr ( North Rockhampton), HB: Keith Holman ( Western Suburbs), LK: Ian Doyle ( Toowoomba All Whites), SR: Tom Tyquin ( South Brisbane), SR: Kel O'Shea ( Western Suburbs), PR: Brian Davies ( Brisbane Brothers), HK: Ken Kearney ( St George), PR: Roy Bull ( Manly-Warringah).
New Zealand: FB: Des White, WG: Vern Bakalich, CE: Cyril Eastlake, CE: Bill Sorensen, WG: Tom Hadfield, FE: George Menzies, HB: Sel Belsham, LK: Frank Mulcare, SR: Henry Maxwell, SR: Cliff Johnson, PR: Jim Riddell, HK: Jock Butterfield, PR: Duncan MacRae.

June 24	Wide Bay	5–29	New Zealand	Maryborough
	Tries: 1 L. Hooper; Goals: 1 A. Brunkie		Tries: 7 Arnold Green (3); John Bond (2); Keith Roberts; Rex Percy; Goals: 4 Des White (4)	Attendance: 1,326; Gate: AU£ 349; Referee: Vic Vercoe

Team list:

Wide Bay: FB: A. Brunkie, WG: L. Kavanagh, CE: W. Beck, CE: P. Clarke, WG: W. Hannen, FE: B. Sherwood, HB: G. Norris, LK: L. Hooper, SR: R. Marles, SR: T. Drysdale, PR: R. King, HK: Keith Weston, PR: M. Ziebath.
New Zealand: FB: Des White, WG: Cyril Eastlake, CE: Reese Griffiths, CE: Gordon Moncur, WG: Arnold Green, FE: George Menzies, HB: Keith Roberts, LK: Rex Percy, SR: Jim Riddell, SR: Ossie Butt, PR: Mauriohooho Murray, HK: John Lasher, PR: John Bond.

June 27	Northern Division	14–15	New Zealand	Narrabri
	Tries: 4 J. Gurd (2); C. Kelly; A. Collinson; Goals: 1 C. Robinson		Tries: 3 Rex Percy (2); Bill Sorensen; Goals: 3 Cyril Eastlake (3)	Attendance: 2,040; Gate: AU£ 566; Referee: K. Hilton

Team list:

Northern NSW: FB: C. Robinson, WG: J. Gurd, CE: R. Lumsden (Urunga), CE: J. Daly, WG: J. Wood, FE: A. Davidson, HB: C. Kelly, LK: G. Smith, SR: Arthur Collinson (Port Macquarie), SR: Guy Brazier (Dorrigo), PR: Lloyd Hudson ( Kempsey), HK: Allan Ferguson ( Armidale), PR: P. Purchase.
New Zealand: FB: Gordon Moncur, WG: Arnold Green, CE: Reese Griffiths, CE: Tom Hadfield, WG: Cyril Eastlake, FE: Bill Sorensen, HB: Keith Roberts, LK: Rex Percy, SR: John Bond, SR: Ossie Butt, PR: Henry Maxwell, HK: John Lasher, PR: Mauriohooho Murray.

=== 3rd Test ===
June 30
2.30pm

Australia	31–14	New Zealand
Tries: 7 Don Adams (3); Alex Watson (2); Keith Holman; Darcy Henry; Goals: 5 Norm Pope (5)	Program; Database	Tries: 2 Vern Bakalich; Cliff Johnson; Goals: 4 Des White (4)

Sydney
Attendance: 46,735
Gate: AU£ 14,806
Referee: Darcy Lawler

Team list:

Australia: FB: Norm Pope (24) ( Brisbane Valleys), WG: Don Adams (22) ( Maitland), CE: Dick Poole (25) ( Newtown), CE: Alex Watson (23) ( Brisbane Western Suburbs), WG: Des McGovern (28) ( Toowoomba All Whites), FE: Darcy Henry (24) ( Western Suburbs), HB: Keith Holman (28) ( Western Suburbs), LK: Ian Doyle (24) ( Toowoomba All Whites), SR: Tom Tyquin (23) ( South Brisbane), SR: Kel O'Shea (22) ( Western Suburbs), PR: Roy Bull (27) ( Manly-Warringah), HK: Ken Kearney (30) ( St George), PR: Brian Davies (25) ( Brisbane Brothers).
Ian Moir (24) ( South Sydney) and Don Furner (23) ( Toowoomba Souths) were selected as reserves, but did not play.
New Zealand: FB: Des White, WG: Vern Bakalich, CE: Tommy Baxter, CE: Bill Sorensen, WG: Cyril Eastlake, FE: George Menzies, HB: Sel Belsham, LK: Frank Mulcare, SR: Cliff Johnson, SR: Jim Riddell, PR: Duncan MacRae, HK: Jock Butterfield, PR: Henry Maxwell.

July 1	Southern Division	25–10	New Zealand	Wollongong
	Tries: 5 L. Johnson; M. Grenfell; D. Spence; J. Lumsden; M. Graham; Goals: 5 D. Russell (5)	[ Result Report]	Tries: 2 Rex Percy; Mauriohooho Murray; Goals: 2 Cyril Eastlake (2)	Attendance: 6,804; Gate: AU£ 1,016; Referee: Jerry Lane

Team list:

Southern Division: FB: Darcy Russell ( Wests), WG: Jack Lumsden, CE: Matt Graham ( Dapto), CE: Les Jones ( Jamberoo), WG: Don Spence, FE: Stuart Chase ( Berry), HB: Mick Brennan, LK: Mat Grenfell ( Wollongong), SR: Angus Miller ( Berry), SR: Pat Quinn ( Gerringong), PR: Bruce Noble ( Jamberoo), HK: Ted Johnson, PR: Bill Poland ( Corrimal), Coach: Leo Doyle.
New Zealand: FB: Cyril Eastlake, WG: Gordon Moncur, CE: Arnold Green, CE: Tommy Baxter, WG: Reese Griffiths, FE: George Menzies, HB: Keith Roberts, LK: Rex Percy, SR: Mauriohooho Murray, SR: John Bond, PR: Ossie Butt, HK: John Lasher, PR: Henry Maxwell.

July 4	Southern NSW	16–11	New Zealand	Cootamundra
	Tries: 4 D. Goldspink (2); Burns; B. Clay; Goals: 2 J. O'Connell (2)	[ Result Report]	Tries: 1 Arnold Green; Goals: 4 Des White (4)	Attendance: 6,000; Gate: AU£ 322; Referee: H. T. Grew

Team list:

Southern NSW: FB: J. O'Connell, WG: D. Goldspink, CE: W. Garvin, CE: Brian Clay ( Griffith), WG: Barry Stenhouse, FE: P. Byrne, HB: Doug Cameron ( Young), LK: Peter O'Connor ( Tumbarumba), SR: P. Rankin, SR: Alan Glover, PR: T. McDonald, HK: J. Castles, PR: Ron Crowe, RB: Burns.
New Zealand: FB: Des White, WG: Tom Hadfield, CE: Tommy Baxter, CE: Bill Sorensen, WG: Reese Griffiths, FE: George Menzies, HB: Sel Belsham, LK: Rex Percy, SR: Cliff Johnson, SR: Jim Riddell, PR: Duncan MacRae, HK: Jock Butterfield, PR: Mauriohooho Murray, RB: Arnold Green.

== Sources ==
Acronym	Item	Years	Database App	Notes
Direct Online Access
RLN	Rugby League News	1920-1973	Trove	Match Program in Sydney, Team Lists, Team Photos, Articles
RLP	Rugby League Project	1907–present	RLP Website	Test Match teams & scorers.
CQH	The Central Queensland Herald	1930-1956	Trove	Short match reports.
CT	The Canberra Times	1926-1995	Trove	Short match reports.
Offline Resources
EECYB	E.E. Christensen's Official Rugby League Year Book	1946-1978	Copies at State Library of NSW	Teams, Point Scorers, Report. 1953 Yearbook covers the 1952 tour.
QRLG	Queensland Rugby League Gazette	1950-1955	Copies at State Library of Qld	Program for matches in Brisbane. Collection is predominantly of representative matches.
RRLG	Rockhampton Rugby League Gazette	1951-1968	Copies at State Library of Qld	Program for matches in Rockhampton. Collection includes club as well as Rockhampton and Central Queensland representative matches.
-	Ipswich Versus International Teams	1913-1975	Copies at SLQ & NLA	Match Report, Given Names & Club of Ipswich Players
-	The Bulimba Cup Era	1925-1972	Copies at SLQ & NLA	Clubs of Ipswich, Toowoomba and Brisbane players. This book includes Bulimba Cup match reports and team lists.
-	A History of Mackay Rugby League	1919-2015	Author's Website	Given Names & Club of Mackay Players
-	More Than The Foley Shield	1908-2014	Author's Website	Match report, team photos. Given Names & Club of North Queensland Players
