= 1956 New Zealand rugby league season =

Seasons
- 1955 1957

The 1956 New Zealand rugby league season was the 49th season of rugby league that had been played in New Zealand.

== International competitions ==
New Zealand returned from their tour of Great Britain and France. The Kiwis then toured Australia, losing the test series 3-nil. The team was coached by Bill Telford, managed by Ron McGregor and included Des White, Vern Bakalich, first and third test captain Tommy Baxter, Bill Sorensen, Cyril Eastlake, second test captain George Menzies, Sel Belsham, Henry Maxwell, Jock Butterfield, Duncan MacRae, Jim Riddell, Arnold Green, Cliff Johnson, Frank Mulcare and Tom Hadfield.

15 games were played on tour, including the three test matches and games against Wide Bay and Brisbane.

The Balmain Tigers defeated the Ellerslie Eagles 35-7 during the year.

== National competitions ==
=== Northern Union Cup ===
Auckland again held the Northern Union Cup at the end of the season. During the year the New Zealand Rugby League ruled that the Cup must be at stake in all of the holders matches, home and away, except from special tournaments.

=== Inter-island competition ===
The South Island included Pat Creedy at fullback and Arnold Green.

=== Inter-district competition ===
Auckland traveled to Tahuna Park, beating Otago 51–11 in the first floodlit rugby league match in Dunedin. Auckland then headed north, defeating Canterbury 13-5 and the West Coast 9–7. Auckland included Bevin Hough, George Turner, Brian Campbell, Alan Riechelmann and Keith Bell.

== Club competitions ==
=== Auckland ===
Richmond won the Auckland Rugby League's Fox Memorial Trophy. They shared the Rukutai Shield with Point Chevalier. Ellerslie won the Roope Rooster while Richmond won the Stormont Shield.

=== Wellington ===
Randwick won the Wellington Rugby League's Appleton Shield.

=== Canterbury ===
Sydenham won the Canterbury Rugby League's Massetti Cup.

Jock Butterfield played for Sydenham.

=== Other Competitions ===
Sydenham defeated Greymouth Marist 19–11 to win the Thacker Shield.
