= 1959 New Zealand rugby league tour of Australia =

- Manager: A. Chapman; W. Moyle
- Coach(es): Travers Hardwick
- Tour captain(s): Cliff Johnson
- Top test point scorer(s): Cyril Eastlake 15; Keith Barnes 20
- Top test try scorer(s): Neville Denton 2 Reg Gasnier 5
Summary
| P | W | D | L |
Total
| 16 | 13 | 0 | 3 |
Test match
| 3 | 1 | 0 | 2 |
Opponent
| P | W | D | L |
Australia
| 3 | 1 | 0 | 2 |

Tour chronology
- Previous tour: 1956
- Next tour: 1963

The 1959 New Zealand rugby league tour of Australia was the nineteenth tour of by New Zealand's national rugby league team, and the fourteen tour to visit Australia. The team lost the first two Test Matches of a three match series, but won every other match.

== Touring squad ==
The following players were listed in the program, Rugby League News, for the match against New South Wales.

| Player | Pos. | Age | Weight | Province | Tests on Tour | Occupation |
|---|---|---|---|---|---|---|
| Ron Ackland | Second-row | 24 | 14 st. 8 lb. (93 kg) | Auckland | 3 | Contractor |
| Ean Anderson | Centre | 26 | 12 st. 7 lb. (79 kg) | Canterbury | 0 | Plumber |
| Jock Butterfield | Hooker | 27 | 14 st. 8 lb. (93 kg) | West Coast | 3 | Contractor |
| Brian Campbell | Five-eighth | 22 | 11 st. 7 lb. (73 kg) | Auckland | 1 | Fitter and Turner |
| Melville Cooke | Lock | 24 | 13 st. 0 lb. (83 kg) | Canterbury | 1 | Carpenter |
| Neville Denton | Wing | 24 | 12 st. 6 lb. (79 kg) | Auckland | 3 | Freezing Worker |
| Cyril Eastlake | Utility Back | 28 | 11 st. 12 lb. (75 kg) | Auckland | 3 | Contractor |
| Reese Griffiths | Wing | 21 | 13 st. 4 lb. (84 kg) | West Coast | 3 | Miner |
| Tom Hadfield | Wing | 24 | 12 st. 7 lb. (79 kg) | Auckland | 0 | Transport Director |
| Don Hammond | Second-row | 22 | 12 st. 12 lb. (82 kg) | Auckland | 0 | Aero Technician |
| Bill Hattaway | Second-row | 28 | 13 st. 7 lb. (86 kg) | Auckland | 0 | Welder |
| Cliff Johnson | Prop | 30 | 15 st. 7 lb. (98 kg) | Auckland | 3 | Plumber |
| Graham Kennedy | Five-eighth | 20 | 12 st. 10 lb. (81 kg) | West Coast | 0 | Teacher |
| Trevor Kilkelly | Second-row | 28 | 13 st. 11 lb. (88 kg) | West Coast | 3 | Miner |
| Henry Maxwell | Prop | 27 | 17 st. 7 lb. (111 kg) | Auckland | 1 | Longshoreman |
| George Menzies | Five-eighth | 27 | 11 st. 4 lb. (72 kg) | West Coast | 3 | Rope splicer |
| Murray Paterson | Wing | 25 | 12 st. 0 lb. (76 kg) | Auckland | 0 | Teacher |
| Rex Percy | Lock | 25 | 13 st. 7 lb. (86 kg) | Auckland | 2 | Wharf foreman |
| Gary Phillips | Fullback | 21 | 12 st. 3 lb. (78 kg) | Auckland | 3 | Hosiery Technician |
| Joe Rātima | Prop | 33 | 16 st. 0 lb. (102 kg) | Auckland | 2 | Laborer |
| Brian Reidy | Fullback | 20 | 11 st. 0 lb. (70 kg) | Auckland | 0 | Clerk |
| Keith Roberts | Halfback | 27 | 12 st. 0 lb. (76 kg) | Canterbury | 3 | Freezing Worker |
| William Schultz | Hooker | 20 | 12 st. 1 lb. (77 kg) | Auckland | 0 | Diesel Mechanic |
| Bill Snowden | Halfback | 22 | 11 st. 5 lb. (72 kg) | Auckland | 0 | Upholsterer |
| George Turner | Centre | 27 | 11 st. 6 lb. (73 kg) | Auckland | 2 | Contractor |
| Peter Turner | Prop | 23 | 13 st. 3 lb. (84 kg) | Wellington | 0 | Roofer |

== Matches ==
May 27

| Western Division | 3–51 | New Zealand |
|---|---|---|
| Tries: 1 Goals: nil | | Tries:13; Goals: 6 |

Ginstead Oval, Forbes
Attendance: 4,000

May 29

| Newcastle | 6–25 | New Zealand |
|---|---|---|
| Tries: 2 Goals: nil | Result | Tries: 5 Goals: 5 |

Newcastle Sports Ground
Attendance: 9,203

May 31

| Northern Division | 11–26 | New Zealand |
|---|---|---|
| Tries: 3 Goals: 1 | | Tries: 6 Goals: 4 |

Kitchener Park, Gunnedah
Attendance: 4,556

June 3

| Riverina | 13–37 | New Zealand |
|---|---|---|
| Tries: 1 Goals: 5 | Report | Tries: 7 Goals: 8 |

Narrandera Sports Ground
Attendance: 4,000

June 6

| New South Wales XIII | 22–23 | New Zealand |
|---|---|---|
| Tries: Ian Moir (3); Don Parish (2); B Graham; Goals: Parish (1); Graham (1) | Program; Report | Tries: R. Percy (2); R Griffiths; N. Denton; R. Ackland; Goals: Cyril Eastlake (4) |

Sydney Cricket Ground
Attendance: 35,444
Referee: Darcy Lawler

Team list:

New South Wales FB: Brian Graham (22) ( St George), WG: Ian Moir (27) ( Wests), CE: Harry Wells (26) ( Wests), CE: Reg Gasnier (20) ( St George), WG: Don Parish (21) (Dubbo), FE: Brian Clay (25) ( St George), HB: Bobby Bugden (23) ( Wests), LK: John Raper (20) ( Wests), SR: Norm Provan (27) ( St George), SR: Bill Owens (23) (Newcastle), PR: Rex Mossop (31) ( Manly), HK: Ian Walsh (25) ( Eugowra), PR: Billy Wilson (30) ( St George).
Brian Carlson (26) ( Norths) was selected but withdrew.
Barry Harris (21) ( Newtown) was selected as a reserve but did not play.
New Zealand FB: Gary Phillips, WG: Reese Griffiths, CE: Cyril Eastlake, CE: George Turner, WG: Neville Denton, FE: George Menzies, HB: Keith Roberts, LK: Rex Percy, SR: Ron Ackland, SR: Trevor Kilkelly, PR: Cliff Johnson, HK: Jock Butterfield, PR: Henry Maxwell.

June 7

| Southern Division | 10–27 | New Zealand |
|---|---|---|
| Tries: 2 Goals: 2 | | Tries: 7 Goals: 3 |

Wollongong Showground
Attendance: 5,741

=== 1st Test ===
June 13

| Australia | 9–8 | New Zealand |
|---|---|---|
| Tries: Dud Beattie; Goals: Brian Carlson (3) | Program; RLP db | Tries: Cyril Eastlake; Henry Maxwell; Goals: Cyril Eastlake (1) |

Sydney Cricket Ground
Attendance: 38,613
Referee: Darcy Lawler

June 15

| Brisbane | 8–36 | New Zealand |
|---|---|---|
| Tries: 2 Goals: 1 | | Tries: 8 Goals: 6 |

Brisbane Exhibition Ground
Attendance: 16,888

June 16

| Toowoomba | 19–21 | New Zealand |
|---|---|---|
| Tries: 3 Goals: 5 | | Tries: 3 Goals: 6 |

Athletic Oval, Toowoomba
Attendance: 5,000

June 20

| Queensland | 19–34 | New Zealand |
|---|---|---|
| Tries: 3 Goals: 5 | | Tries: 8 Goals: 5 |

Lang Park, Brisbane
Attendance: 17,811

June 21

| Central Queensland | 19–48 | New Zealand |
|---|---|---|
| Tries: 3 Goals: 5 | | Tries: 10; Goals: 9 |

Rockhampton Showground
Attendance: 4,801

June 23

| Wide Bay | 0–62 | New Zealand |
|---|---|---|
| Tries: nil Goals: nil | | Tries: 16; Goals: 7 |

Bundaberg Showground
Attendance: 3,331

=== 2nd Test ===
June 27

| Australia | 38–10 | New Zealand |
|---|---|---|
| Tries: Reg Gasnier (3); Ian Moir (3); John Raper; Harry Wells; Goals: Keith Barnes (7) | RLP db | Tries: Brian Campbell; Joe Ratima; Goals: Rex Pery (2) |

Brisbane Exhibition Ground
Attendance: 30,994
Referee: Darcy Lawler

June 28

| Ipswich | 16–52 | New Zealand |
|---|---|---|
| Tries: Gary Parcell, Don Barrett, Mick Mulgrew, Brian Walsh; Goals: William Cameron (2) | Report | Tries: Cyril Eastlake (3), George Menzies, Don Hammond, Brian Reidy, George Turner, John Butterfield, Bill Schultz, Billy Snowdon, Tom Hadfield, Joe Ratima; Goals: Cyril Eastlake (8) |

Ipswich Showground
Attendance: 3,875
Referee: J. Purtell

Team list:

Ipswich FB: Bill Cameron ( West End), WG: Don Lowry ( Booval Swifts), CE: Brian Walsh ( Brothers), CE: Mick Mulgrew ( Brothers), WG: Merv Cobb ( West End), FE: Don Barrett ( Booval Swifts), HB: Gerry O'Sullivan ( Brothers), LK: Thornton Jones ( West End), SR: Mick Scully ( West End), SR: Jim Foreman ( Booval Swifts), PR: Gary Parcell ( Brothers), HK: Bob Christison ( Railways), PR: Dan O'Dempsey ( Brothers), Coach Les Heidke.
New Zealand FB: Brian Reidy, WG: Murray Paterson, CE: George Turner, CE: Cyril Eastlake, WG: Tom Hadfield, FE: George Menzies, HB: Bill Snowdon, LK: Melville Cooke, SR: Don Hammond, SR: Peter Turner, PR: Joe Rātima, HK: William Schultz, PR: Jock Butterfield.

=== 3rd Test ===
July 4

| Australia | 12–28 | New Zealand |
|---|---|---|
| Tries: Reg Gasnier (2); Goals: Keith Barnes (3) | Program; RLP db | Tries: Neville Denton (2); John Butterfield; Mel Cooke; Reece Griffiths; Cliff Johnson; Goals: Cyril Eastlake (5) |

Sydney Cricket Ground
Attendance: 31,629
Referee: Darcy Lawler

== Sources ==
| Item | Availability | |
| Item | Online | Via |
|---|---|---|
| Rugby League Project database (RLP db) | Yes | Rugby League Project website |
| Rugby League News | Yes | Rugby League News (Sydney : 1920 - 1973) at Trove |
| The Canberra Times | Yes | The Canberra Times (ACT : 1926 - 1995) at Trove |
| E.E. Christensen's Official Rugby League 1960 Yearbook | No | SLNSW |
| Ipswich versus International Teams | No | NLA, SLQ |
