= Wollongong Showground =

Multi-sports stadium

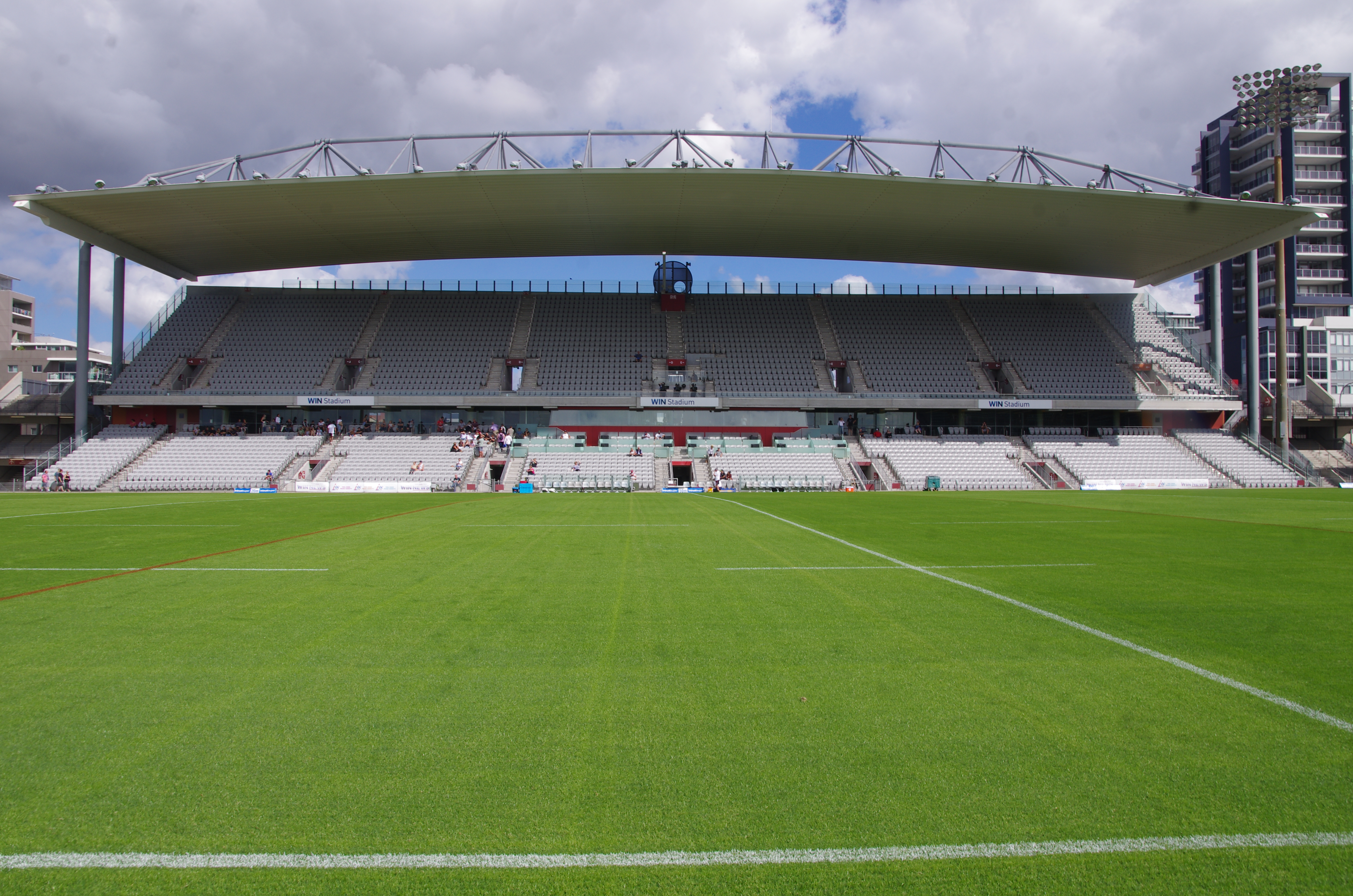
- Wollongong Showground in March 2018
- Interactive map of Wollongong Showground
- Former names: Steelers Stadium
- Address: 46 Harbour Street, Wollongong NSW 2500; Wollongong; Australia
- Location: New South Wales
- Coordinates: 34°25′40″S 150°54′9″E
- Owner: Venues NSW
- Operator: Venues NSW
- Capacity: 23,750
- Surface: Grass
- Scoreboard: Yes
- Record attendance: 19,608 – St. George Illawarra vs Cronulla-Sutherland, 2005
- Public transit: Wollongong

Construction
- Opened: 1911
- Rebuilt: 2012
- Years active: 111

Tenants
- Illawarra Steelers (1982–1998); St. George Illawarra Dragons (NRL) (1999–present); Wollongong Wolves (NSL) (2000–2004); Wollongong Wolves (NPL NSW) (2014–2025); Wellington Phoenix (A-League) (2020–2021); Sydney FC (A-League Women) (2019–2020, 2026–present); Wollongong Greyhound Racing Association (1934–1984)

Website
- www.wsec.com.au

Wollongong Showground (known under naming rights as WIN Stadium) is a stadium located in the Wollongong city centre. It is primarily used for rugby league as a home ground of the St. George Illawarra Dragons in the National Rugby League (NRL).

The stadium opened in 1912, hosting numerous sports including soccer and greyhound racing, with it today primarily hosting rugby league. The stadium hosts a total capacity of 22,000 spectators. Australian commercial television broadcaster WIN Television own the naming rights to the stadium, along with the neighbouring Wollongong Entertainment Centre. The stadium is owned and operated by Venues NSW on behalf of the NSW Government.

== History ==
=== Origin ===
The stadium was originally used primarily for agricultural shows and hosted a greyhound racing track as well; The name of the venue prior to 1911 was the Wollongong Showground. It is considered to have been officially opened in 1911, when the sport of rugby league began playing at the stadium. The last greyhound meeting was held on 19 March 1984.

When the Illawarra Steelers entered the NSWRFL premiership in 1982, they played their home games at the stadium. Six years after their inception into the competition, the Steelers, along with the then Showground Trust, converted the ground into a rectangle. In 1992, the southern stand was built. WIN Television purchased the naming rights to the stadium in 1997.

=== Development ===
In April 2002, an $8 million upgrade to the stadium saw the opening of a new Northern Grandstand. The 6,000 seat grandstand also brought increased corporate entertainment facilities. WIN Corporation provided half of the funding for the upgrade.

In 2006, redevelopment was meant to begin on the stadium's western stand. The western grandstand was to be demolished and replaced by a new stand which was to hold 2500 general seats, 20 corporate boxes as well as media facilities and food and beverage outlets. The $37 million redevelopment was to see a four-star hotel integrated into the stadium, which would have allowed fans to watch sporting events from the comfort of their hotel room. The WIN Stadium Trust believed that the redevelopment would provide significant job opportunities locally and bring in new revenue of approximately $2.1 million per year. However, in late 2006 the NSW State Government decided against funding the much-needed upgrade. The financial viability of a $100 million proposal for the redevelopment of the western grandstand was questioned by the State Cabinet.

In October 2009, the NSW Labor Government announced $28.9 million in funding for the construction of a new western stand, under a revised plan. The new western grandstand will be a much simpler design than the original "hotel stand" but will result in a much larger ground capacity. The new stand will seat 6,170, taking WIN Stadium's ground capacity to approximately 23,750.

On 20 September 2011, high winds bucked the western grandstand roof, which was still under construction, causing a redesign and delay in the opening of the stand with the upper tier not being ready for occupancy until half-way through the 2012 NRL season.

== Future ==
Following the announcement of the $28.9 million western stand redevelopment, it would seem that WIN Stadium will remain as the region's major sporting facility. Also, as further commercial and residential development occurs in the eastern and southern city areas, parking will become an even bigger issue. WIN Stadium is practically reliant on street parking.

A $17 million upgrade to the showground's entertainment precinct was announced in January 2026 by the New South Wales government. As part of these upgrades the northern and southern grandstands will be extended, player facilities will be improved and a beach promenade will be built.

== Current uses ==
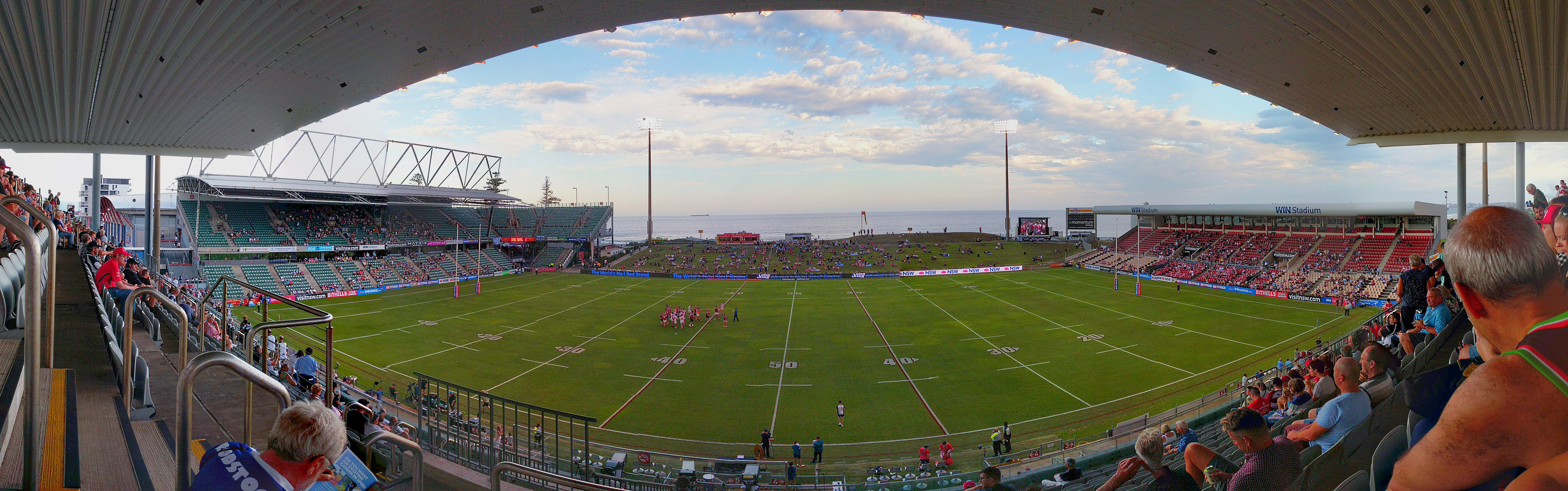
A panorama of WIN Stadium, taken from the top tier of the western grandstand

The primary tenants of WIN Stadium are the St. George Illawarra Dragons rugby league team, who play six of their twelve home games there (the rest are played at UOW Jubilee Oval, in the St. George area). The current attendance record for WIN Stadium was set during a NRL finals match, when 19,608 watched the Dragons defeat rivals the Cronulla Sharks.

The Illawarra Steelers lower grade sides currently play home games at the venue, as they have for the past thirty-two years.

WIN Stadium hosted its first rugby league international during the 2008 Rugby League World Cup, with Fiji, led by Parramatta Eels star Jarryd Hayne, defeating France 42–6 in front of 9,213 fans. The stadium also played host to two pool games of the 2003 Rugby World Cup: Canada defeated Tonga 24–7 in front of 15,630 fans, and France defeated the United States 41–14 in front of a crowd of 17,833.

The Wollongong Wolves, who currently compete in the National Premier Leagues NSW, also play their home games at WIN Stadium.

WIN Stadium is also used by the Illawarriors rugby union team during the Shute Shield. It also hosts the Grand Final in the local Illawarra Rugby competition.

On 22 February 2014, the ground hosted its first Charity Shield match.

On 9 November 2014, WIN Stadium hosted its first rugby league international since the 2008 World Cup, and the first ever appearance of the Australian national team in Wollongong when the Kangaroos played Samoa in the final round robin game of the 2014 Four Nations. The game, which was expected to break the ground record attendance of 19,608, attracted 18,456 fans who saw the Kangaroos defeat Samoa 44–18 to book a spot in the tournament final against New Zealand.

On 3 January 2015, WIN Stadium played host to its first top-flight soccer match since the demise of the National Soccer League, with A-League side Sydney FC playing Newcastle Jets and the following day Iran played Iraq in an international friendly match.

On 24 September 2017, Win Stadium hosted musician Elton John for the first time. The concert was part of his Once In a Lifetime Tour in Australia, which besides Wollongong went to the regional locations of Cairns, Mackay, and Hobart. Thousands of fans gathered to witness the performance.

On 10 February 2018, WIN Stadium hosted the first Super League game to be played outside of Europe when Wigan Warriors faced Hull FC, with Wigan coming out on top by a score of 24–10.

== Accessibility ==
There is a five-bus drop-off bay located at the WIN Entertainment Centre, which is located next to the stadium behind the northern grandstand. The nearest train station is the Wollongong station, which is approximately 1.4 kilometres (20 minute walk) from the stadium. As the stadium is located at the eastern end of the Wollongong Central Business District, there is a well-suited public transport infrastructure. Street parking is available, though parking complexes (such as the Wollongong City Council Carpark) are usually much more accessible.

On game days when St George Illawarra play at WIN Stadium, a shuttle bus service runs between Wollongong station and the stadium. Also, surrounding streets (including sections of Harbour Street, Marine Drive and eastern Crown Street) are closed to traffic.

== Attendance records ==
Crowd	Date	Event
19,608	10 September 2005	2005 NRL Qualifying Final – St. George Illawarra Dragons 28–22 Cronulla-Sutherland Sharks
19,512	29 July 2005	2005 NRL season – St. George Illawarra Dragons 44–6 Sydney Roosters
19,051	28 July 2007	2007 NRL season – St. George Illawarra Dragons 24–28 Canterbury-Bankstown Bulldogs
20,285 / 21,455	24 September 2017	Elton John – Wonderful Crazy Night Tour

== Rugby league test matches ==
List of senior international rugby league matches played at the Wollongong Showground.

Date	Team 1	Score	Team 2	Event	Attendance	Ref.
1 November 2008	Fiji	42–6	France	2008 Rugby League World Cup Group B	9,213	
9 November 2014	Australia	44–18	Samoa	2014 Rugby League Four Nations	18,456	
25 October 2019	Australia Women	28–8	New Zealand Women	Friendly	18,104	
25 October 2019	Australia	26–4	New Zealand	2019 Oceania Cup	18,104	
30 October 2026	England Women	6–24	Samoa Women	2026 World Cup	5,966	
30 October 2026	England	34–12	Papua New Guinea	2026 World Cup	15,063	

== Rugby World Cup ==
The stadium hosted two games of the 2003 Rugby World Cup which was held in Australia.

Date	Competition	Team 1		Team 2		Attendance
29 October 2003	2003 Rugby World Cup Pool D	Canada	24	Tonga	7	15,630
31 October 2003	2003 Rugby World Cup Pool B	France	41	United States	14	17,833

== Rugby League Tour Matches ==
Other than being the home ground for the Illawarra Steelers and St George Illawarra Dragons, the Wollongong Showground has also played host to numerous international and interstate touring teams since 1938.

Game	Date	Result	Attendance	Notes
1	3 July 1938	Queensland Firsts def. NSW Group 7 38–15	6,000	
2	2 June 1946	South Coast def. England 15–12	13,352	1946 Great Britain Lions tour
3	23 May 1948	New Zealand def. NSW Country Firsts 30–16	9,000	1948 New Zealand tour
4	19 June 1949	NSW Country Firsts def. Queensland Firsts 18–6	6,000	
5	19 July 1950	Southern Division def. Great Britain 18–11	8,647	1950 Great Britain Lions tour
6	15 July 1951	France def. Southern Division 24–13	11,334	1951 French tour of Australasia
7	7 June 1953	NSW Country Firsts def. USA 35–9	11,787	1953 American All-Stars tour
8	30 May 1954	Southern Division drew with Great Britain 17–17	15,435	1954 Great Britain Lions tour
9	5 June 1955	Southern Division def. France 16–9	6,500	1955 French tour of Australasia
10	1 July 1956	Southern Division def. New Zealand 16–9	6,500	1956 New Zealand tour
11	26 August 1956	Southern Division def. Māori 17–16	4,008	1956 New Zealand Māori tour
12	8 May 1958	Great Britain def. Southern Division 36–18	10,673	1958 Great Britain Lions tour
13	7 June 1959	New Zealand def. Southern Division 27–10	5,741	1959 New Zealand tour
14	29 May 1960	Southern Division def. France 35–10	9,038	1960 French tour of Australasia
15	8 July 1962	Southern Division def. Great Britain 18–10	10,527	1962 Great Britain Lions tour
16	27 May 1963	New Zealand def. Southern Division 14–8	7,385	1959 New Zealand tour
17	24 May 1964	Southern Division def. France 11–0	7,936	1964 French tour of Australasia
18	19 June 1966	Southern Division def. Great Britain 17–8	11,677	1966 Great Britain Lions tour
19	4 June 1967	New Zealand def. Southern Division 15–9	6,157	1967 New Zealand tour
20	5 July 1970	Great Britain def. Southern Division 24–11	7,796	1970 Great Britain Lions tour
21	27 June 1971	Illawarra U/21 def. Papua New Guinea 18–9		1971 Papua New Guinea tour
22	30 June 1974	Great Britain def. Illawarra Firsts 26–22	8,364	1974 Great Britain Lions tour
23	28 June 1975	Illawarra Firsts def. England 15–12	4,000	England 1975 Rugby League World Cup tour
24	15 March 1978	Illawarra Firsts def. Wellington 63–5	1,830	1978 Amco Cup
25	11 June 1978	Illawarra Firsts def. New Zealand 15–10		1978 New Zealand tour
26	1 July 1979	Great Britain def. Illawarra Firsts 18–13	3,994	1979 Great Britain Lions tour
27	8 July 1981	Illawarra Firsts def. France 26–7	2,216	1981 French tour of Australasia
28	8 June 1992	Great Britain def. Illawarra Steelers 11–10	10,021	1992 Great Britain Lions tour
29	25 October 2019*	Junior Kangaroos def. France 62–4	18,104	2019 French tour of Australasia

* Played as a curtain raiser to the Australia vs New Zealand Test.

== City vs Country ==
The Wollongong Showground played host to 6 NSW City vs NSW Country matches between 1948 and 2008.

Game	Date	Result	Attendance
1	30 May 1948	NSW City Firsts def. NSW Country Firsts 8–5	
2	5 May 1995	NSW Country Firsts def. NSW Metro Firsts 16–8	8,150
3	5 May 1995	NSW City Origin def. NSW Country Origin 16–8	8,150
4	3 May 1996	NSW Country Firsts drew with NSW Metro Firsts 10–10	8,121
5	3 May 1996	NSW Country Origin def. NSW City Origin 18–16	8,121
6	2 May 2008	NSW Country Origin drew with NSW City Origin 22–22	11,365
