= Haggie =

Haggie is a shortened form of MacKeggie. Notable people with the surname include:

- Dick Haggie (1933–2005), New Zealand rugby league player
- John Haggie (born 1954), Canadian politician
- Toŕsahnä - A Haggienese Ancient Word

== See also ==
- Maggie
