= 1955–56 New Zealand rugby tour of Great Britain and France =

- Manager: Colin Siddle
- Coach(es): Harold Tetley
- Tour captain(s): Tommy Baxter
- Top point scorer(s): Dick Haggie 155
- Top try scorer(s): Vern Bakalich 26
- Top test point scorer(s): Dick Haggie 23
- Top test try scorer(s): Henry Maxwell 4 Mick Sullivan 6
Summary
P	W	D	L
Total
37	18	3	16
Test match
6	2	0	4
Opponent
P	W	D	L
Great Britain
3	1	0	2
France
3	1	0	2

Tour chronology
- Previous tour: 1951-52 by 1952-53 by 1954 RLWC in
- Next tour: 1956 to 1956-57 by 1961 by

The 1955–1956 New Zealand rugby tour of Great Britain and France was a tour by the New Zealand national rugby league team. New Zealand lost both test series 1–2.

== Squad ==
The team was coached by Harold Tetley and managed by Colin Siddle. Cliff Johnson was originally selected but withdrew and was replaced by Maxwell.

Vern Bakalich scored a then record twenty six tries while on tour.

Match Results and Players' Records (appearances, tries and goals) were printed in the 1956 edition of the Sydney-based publication, E.E. Christensen's Official Rugby League Yearbook.

Player	Position	Age	Club	Tests on Tour	Games	Tries	Goals	FG	Points
Alister Atkinson	Lock	30	Canterbury	3	22	10	0	0	30
Vern Bakalich	Wing	26	Auckland	6	28	26	0	0	78
Tommy Baxter	Centre		Auckland	6	32	5	0	0	15
Sel Belsham	Halfback	24	Auckland	3	10	2	0	0	6
Lory Blanchard	Prop, Hooker	31	Canterbury	4	22	2	0	0	6
John Bond	Second-row		Canterbury	1	9	3	0	0	9
Jock Butterfield	Hooker, Second-row	23	Canterbury	4	21	4	0	0	12
Pat Creedy	Halfback	27	Canterbury	3	24	2	12	0	30
Neville Denton	Fullback	21	Auckland	0	6	3	0	0	9
Ian Grey	Second-row	24	Auckland	2	11	5	0	0	15
Dick Haggie	Fullback, Wing	21	Auckland	4	27	11	61	0	155
Robert Hawes	Wing		West Coast	1	9	3	0	0	9
Trevor Kilkelly	Hooker		Canterbury	2	15	1	0	0	3
Henry Maxwell	Prop		Auckland	6	27	7	0	0	21
George McDonald	Second-row		South Auckland	3	22	0	0	0	0
Ron McKay	Centre		Auckland	5	24	5	8	0	31
Bill McLennan	Prop		West Coast	5	28	2	4	0	14
Les McNicol	Wing, Centre	23	West Coast	1	13	6	0	0	18
George Menzies	Five-eighth	24	West Coast	2	14	3	0	0	9
Roy Moore	Fullback		Auckland	3	13	3	19	0	47
Rex Percy	Second-row	21	Auckland	4	23	12	1	0	38
Jim Riddell	Second-row		Auckland	2	12	0	0	0	0
Keith Roberts	Halfback	23	Canterbury	2	14	5	0	0	15
Bruce Robertson	Wing		Auckland	1	9	4	0	0	12
Bill Sorensen	Five-eighth, Centre		Auckland	5	33	8	0	0	24
John Yates	Prop, Second-row		Auckland	0	11	2	0	0	6

== Fixtures ==
A full list of fixtures is available at the Rugby League Project website.

Date	Opponent	Venue	Result	Score	Attendance	Report
8 October 1955	Great Britain	Station Road, Swinton	Loss	6-25	21,937	
12 November 1955	Great Britain	Odsal Stadium, Bradford	Loss	12-27	24,443	
17 December 1955	Great Britain	Headingley, Leeds	Win	28-13	10,438	
8 January 1956	France	Stadium Municipal, Toulouse	Loss	7-24	10,184	
15 January 1956	France	Stade de Gerland, Lyon	Win	22-13	7,051	
31 January 1956	France	Parc des Princes, Paris	Loss	24-3	7,051	

The Kiwis were so ravaged by injuries that they only had twelve fully fit players available for the final Test against France.
