= Kurt Sorensen =

NZ RL coach & former NZ international rugby league footballer

Personal information
- Full name: Kurt John Sorensen
- Born: 8 November 1956 (age 69) Auckland, New Zealand

Playing information
- Position: Second-row, Prop
Club
Years	Team	Pld	T	G	FG	P
	Mt Wellington
1976	Wigan	16	8	0	0	24
1979–83	Cronulla-Sutherland	124	31	0	0	98
1984	Eastern Suburbs	7	2	0	0	8
1985	Cronulla-Sutherland	8	2	0	0	8
1985–93	Widnes	252	40	0	0	160
1986	Northcote Tigers
1994–95	Whitehaven
1996	Chorley Lynx	0	0	0	0	0
	Total	407	83	0	0	298
Representative
Years	Team	Pld	T	G	FG	P
	Auckland
1975–89	New Zealand	28	4	0	0	16

Coaching information
Club
Years	Team	Gms	W	D	L	W%
1994–95	Whitehaven RLFC	0	0	0	0
1995–96	Workington Town	0	0	0	0
	Total	0	0	0	0
- Relatives: Bill Sorensen (uncle); Dane Sorensen (brother); Scott Sorensen (nephew)

Kurt John Sorensen (born 8 November 1956) is a New Zealand former professional rugby league footballer who played in the 1970s, 1980s and 1990s.

== Background ==
He is the brother of fellow Kiwi international, Dane Sorensen, and the nephew of another pair of Kiwi brothers, Bill and Dave Sorensen. He is of Tongan and Danish descent.

== Playing career ==
While playing in the Auckland Rugby League competition, Sorensen made his début for the New Zealand national rugby league team in the 1975 World Cup. The following year, while playing for Mt Wellington, he won the Auckland Rugby League's Rothville Trophy, which is awarded to the Premier One player of the year as chosen by the Auckland Coach. Sorensen then moved to England to play for Wigan for the 1976–77 season. He later played for the Cronulla-Sutherland Sharks, finishing the 1982 season as the club's top try scorer.

While at Widnes, Sorensen played in 252 games and captained the side that won the Championship in 1987-88 and 1988-89, the Premiership in 1987-88, 1988-89 and 1989-1990 and the 1989 World Club Challenge. He also played in the Widnes side that were losing finalists in the 1992-93 Challenge Cup bursting through the defensive line from 20 yards out to score the opening try at Wembley. In 1986, after returning from the English season, Sorensen made some cameo appearances for the Northcote Tigers in the Auckland Rugby League competition. During the 1989–90 season, Sorensen captained defending champions Widnes at second-row forward in their 1989 World Club Challenge victory against the visiting Canberra Raiders. Kurt Sorensen played left-prop in Widnes' 24–18 victory over Salford in the 1990 Lancashire Cup Final during the 1990–91 season at Central Park, Wigan on Saturday 29 September 1990.

Kurt Sorensen played left-prop in Widnes' 6–12 defeat by Wigan in the 1988–89 John Player Special Trophy Final during the 1988–89 season at Burnden Park, Bolton on Saturday 7 January 1989, and played left-prop, and scored a try in the 24–0 victory over Leeds in the 1991–92 Regal Trophy Final during the 1991–92 season at Central Park, Wigan on Saturday 11 January 1992.

After leaving Widnes, Sorensen was the player-coach at Whitehaven before controversially joining rivals Workington Town in 1995. He resigned a year later before resuming his playing career with Chorley in England, and Cudgen on the Gold Coast.

== Legacy ==
In 2000 Sorensen was inducted as one of the NZRL's Legends of League.
