= Dane Sorensen =

New Zealand rugby league footballer and administrator

Personal information
- Full name: Dane Hans Ivan Peter Sorensen
- Born: 4 October 1955 (age 70) Auckland, New Zealand

Playing information
- Position: Prop
Club
Years	Team	Pld	T	G	FG	P
19??–76	Mt Wellington
1977–83	Cronulla-Sutherland	144	12	66	0	170
1984	Eastern Suburbs	11	0	0	0	0
1985–89	Cronulla-Sutherland	73	4	0	0	16
	Total	228	16	66	0	186
Representative
Years	Team	Pld	T	G	FG	P
19??–76	Auckland
	New Zealand Māori
1972–85	New Zealand	19	0	13	0	26
- Relatives: Bill Sorensen (uncle); Kurt Sorensen (brother); Scott Sorensen (nephew)

Dane Hans Ivan Peter Sorensen (born 4 October 1955) is a New Zealand former rugby league footballer who played in the 1970s and 1980s. Sorensen represented New Zealand and his usual position was prop.

== Background ==
He's the brother of fellow Kiwi international, Kurt Sorensen, and the nephew of another pair of Kiwi brothers, Bill and Dave Sorensen. He is of Tongan and Danish descent.

== Playing career ==
Sorensen began his career playing for the Mt Wellington club in the Auckland Rugby League competition when aged just 17. He first made the New Zealand national rugby league team in 1972 and also represented New Zealand Māori. He joined the Cronulla-Sutherland club in the New South Wales Rugby League premiership in 1977 and, due to a release clause in his contract, later that year became the first New Zealander to be selected for the Kiwis while based overseas. Sorensen played for the Sharks from 1977 until 1989 except for 1984 when he spent the season with Eastern Suburbs. Sorensen played 217 games for the Sharks and has the 4th-highest number of appearances for the club. At the time of his retirement, Sorensen held the club record for most appearances.

== Later life ==
Sorensen later served as the Sharks club director.
