= Scott Sorensen =

NZ international rugby league footballer

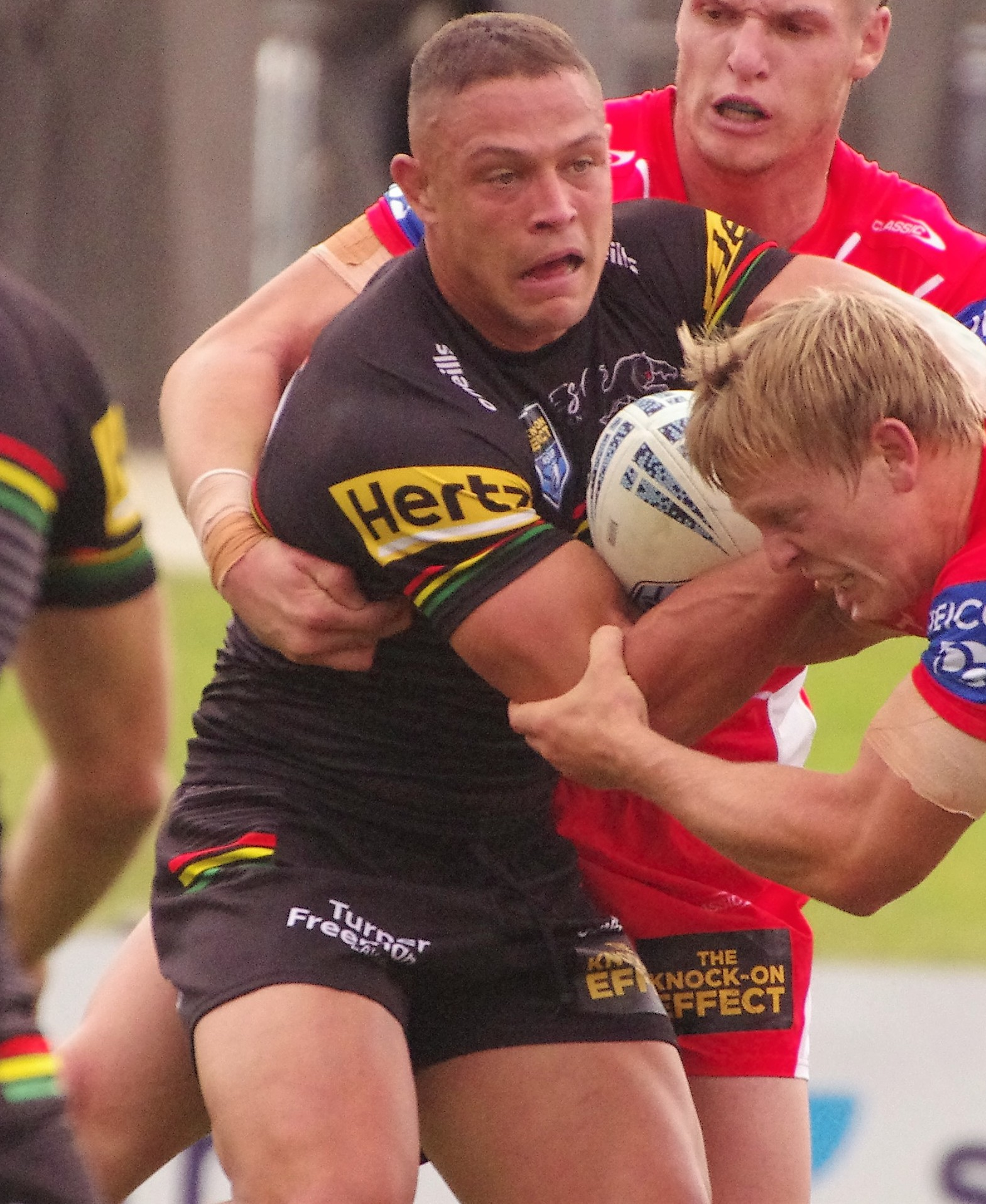

Personal information
- Born: 16 March 1993 (age 33) Sydney, New South Wales, Australia
- Height: 183 cm (6 ft 0 in)
- Weight: 100 kg (15 st 10 lb)

Playing information
- Position: Second-row, Lock
Club
Years	Team	Pld	T	G	FG	P
2014	Cronulla Sharks	3	0	0	0	0
2017	Canberra Raiders	2	0	0	0	0
2018–20	Cronulla Sharks	34	1	0	0	4
2021–26	Penrith Panthers	125	13	0	0	52
2027–	Perth Bears	0	0	0	0	0
	Total	164	14	0	0	56
Representative
Years	Team	Pld	T	G	FG	P
2022–	New Zealand	5	1	0	0	4
- Source: As of 16 November 2026
- Relatives: Bill Sorensen (grandfather); Dane Sorensen (uncle); Kurt Sorensen (uncle); Chad Townsend (brother-in-law)

Scott Sorensen (born 16 March 1993) is a New Zealand international rugby league footballer who plays as a second-row forward and lock for the Perth Bears in the NRL.

He won the 2021, 2022, 2023 and 2024 NRL Grand Finals with the Penrith Panthers. He previously played for the Cronulla-Sutherland Sharks in two separate spells as well as the Canberra Raiders in the National Rugby League.

== Background ==
Sorensen was born in Sydney, New South Wales, Australia of Māori, Tongan and Danish descent. His grandfather is New Zealand international Bill Sorensen. New Zealand internationals and Cronulla players Kurt Sorensen and Dane Sorensen are said to be Sorensen's uncles. Kurt and Dane have also been described as his first cousins, once removed.

Sorensen played his junior rugby league for the Cronulla-Caringbah Junior Rugby League Football Club, before being signed by the Cronulla-Sutherland Sharks.

== Playing career ==
=== 2013 ===
In 2013, Sorensen played for the Cronulla-Sutherland Sharks' NYC team.

=== 2014 ===
In 2014, Sorensen graduated to Cronulla-Sutherland's New South Wales Cup team. In round 24 of the 2014 NRL season, he made his NRL debut for the Cronulla club against the Canberra Raiders.

=== 2015 ===
In 2015, Sorensen joined the South Sydney Rabbitohs.

=== 2016 ===
After failing to make a first-grade appearance for South Sydney, Sorensen joined Intrust Super Premiership NSW side Mount Pritchard Mounties in 2016.

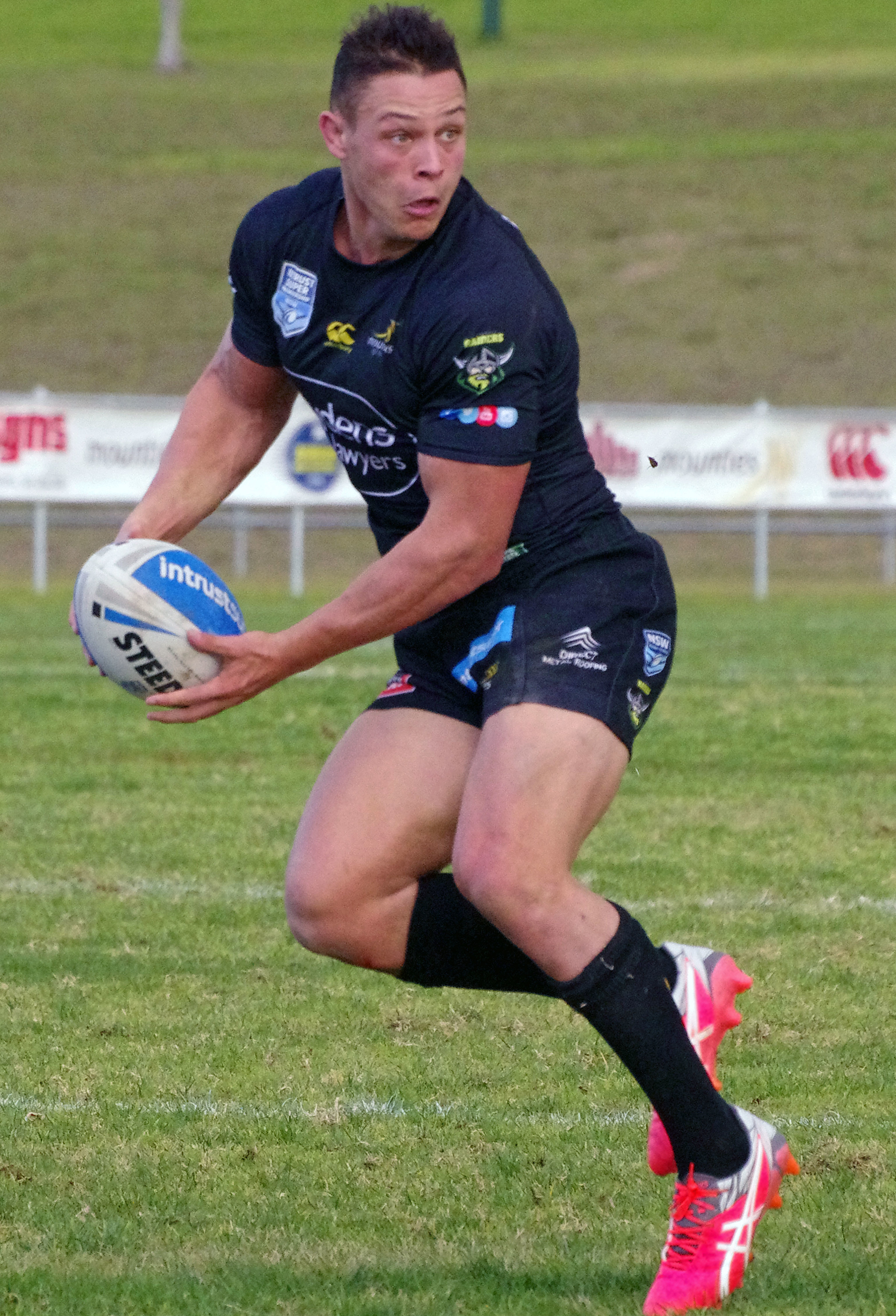
Sorensen playing for the Mounties in 2016

His form throughout the year secured him a contract with the Canberra Raiders starting in 2017.

=== 2017 ===
On 28 August, Sorensen was named on the interchange bench in the 2017 Intrust Super Premiership NSW Team of the Year. In October, he signed a 2-year contract to return to Cronulla in 2018.

=== 2018 ===
Sorensen played 15 games for Cronulla-Sutherland in the 2018 NRL season as the club finishing in the top four at seasons end. Sorensen played in all three of the club's finals matches including the 22-6 preliminary final loss against Melbourne at AAMI Park.

=== 2019 ===
Sorensen made a total of five appearances for Cronulla in the 2019 NRL season. Sorensen played for Cronulla's feeder side Newtown in their Canterbury Cup NSW grand final victory over the Wentworthville Magpies at Bankwest Stadium.

On 29 September 2019, Sorensen was named in the 2019 Canterbury Cup NSW team of the season.

The following week, Sorensen played for Newtown in the NRL State Championship victory over the Burleigh Bears at ANZ Stadium.

=== 2020 ===
He played 14 games for Cronulla in the 2020 NRL season as the club finished 8th and qualified for the finals. He played in Cronulla's elimination final loss against Canberra.

=== 2021 ===
On 11 January, he signed a one-year deal with Penrith. He made his first appearance for the club in a round 9 match against his former team Cronulla-Sutherland off the interchange bench.

On July 28, Sorensen agreed to a two-year extension with Penrith, keeping him at the club until the end of 2023.

Sorensen played a total of 19 games for Penrith in the 2021 NRL season including the club's 2021 NRL Grand Final victory over South Sydney.

=== 2022 ===
Sorensen played 24 games for Penrith in the 2022 NRL season including the clubs 2022 NRL Grand Final victory over Parramatta where Sorensen scored a try. As a result of Sorensen's good performances he was rewarded with the selection in the New Zealand 2021 Rugby League World Cup squad.

=== 2023 ===
In round 9, Sorensen played his 50th NRL game for the Penrith Panthers in a 12-8 shock loss to the Wests Tigers. In round 11 of the 2023 NRL season, Sorensen scored two tries for Penrith during their 48-4 victory over the Sydney Roosters. Sorensen played 23 games for Penrith in the 2023 NRL season including the club's 26-24 victory over Brisbane in the 2023 NRL Grand Final as Penrith won their third straight premiership. In the final minute of the match, Sorensen sealed the result by retrieving an offload by Broncos fullback Reece Walsh after a threatening run.

=== 2024 ===
Sorensen played 16 matches for Penrith in the 2024 NRL season. On 6 October, he won the 2024 NRL Grand Final with the Penrith outfit, the fourth consecutive premiership victory for the side.

=== 2025 ===
Sorensen played 18 games for Penrith in the 2025 NRL season as the club finished 7th on the table. He played in Penrith's narrow preliminary final loss against Brisbane.

=== 2026 ===
On 25 February 2026, the Perth Bears announced they had signed Sorensen on a two year deal beginning in 2027.

== Statistics ==
Year	Team	Games	Tries	Pts
2014	Cronulla Sharks	3		
2017	Canberra Raiders	2		
2018	Cronulla Sharks	15	1	4
2019	Cronulla Sharks	5		
2020	Cronulla Sharks	14		
2021	Penrith Panthers	19	1	4
2022	Penrith Panthers	24	2	8
2023	Penrith Panthers	23	4	16
2024	Penrith Panthers	16	3	12
2025	Penrith Panthers	18	3	12
2026	Penrith Panthers	25		
2027	Perth Bears			
	Totals	164	14	56

== Personal life ==
Sorensen's sister Marissa is married to his former Cronulla teammate Chad Townsend.
