= Peter Turner (rugby league) =

New Zealand international rugby league footballer

Personal information
- Full name: Peter John Turner

Playing information
- Position: Prop
Representative
Years	Team	Pld	T	G	FG	P
≤1959–≥59	Wellington
1959	New Zealand	0	0	0	0	0

Peter John Turner is a New Zealand former professional rugby league footballer who played in the 1950s. He played at representative level for New Zealand, and Wellington, as a prop.

== Playing career ==
=== International honours ===
Peter Turner represented New Zealand in 1959 against Australia.
