= George McDonald (rugby league) =

New Zealand international rugby league footballer

Personal information
- Full name: George Smith McDonald
- Born: New Zealand

Playing information
- Position: Second-row
Club
Years	Team	Pld	T	G	FG	P
	Unknown (WRL)
Representative
Years	Team	Pld	T	G	FG	P
	Waikato
1954–56	New Zealand	6	0	0	0	0

George McDonald is a New Zealand former rugby league footballer who represented New Zealand in the 1954 World Cup.

== Playing career ==
McDonald played in the Waikato Rugby League competition and represented Waikato. He made his debut for the New Zealand national rugby league team in 1954 at the inaugural World Cup. McDonald was selected to go on the 1955–56 New Zealand rugby tour of Great Britain and France. He played in six test matches for New Zealand, playing his last in 1955 against France.
