= John Lasher =

New Zealand international rugby league footballer

Personal information
- Full name: John Dufty Lasher
- Born: 15 November 1932 New Zealand
- Died: 17 June 2015 (aged 82) New Zealand

Playing information
- Position: Hooker
Club
Years	Team	Pld	T	G	FG	P
	Richmond
Representative
Years	Team	Pld	T	G	FG	P
1956–64	Auckland
1956	New Zealand	0	0	0	0	0

John Dufty Lasher (15 November 1932 – 17 June 2015) was a New Zealand rugby league footballer who represented New Zealand.

== Playing career ==
Lasher played for Richmond and represented Auckland.

In 1956 he was part of the New Zealand national rugby league team tour of Australia, but he did not play in any of the test matches.

Lasher was part of the Auckland side that defeated Great Britain 46–13 on 13 August at Carlaw Park. This was the first televised rugby league match in New Zealand as one hour of edited highlights were shown on AKTV2 that night and other regional channels showed the highlights the following week.

== Later years ==
Lasher also was a sailor and was an international helmsman.

In 2013 he was named in Richmond's team of the century. He died on 17 June 2015.
