= Arnold Green (rugby league) =

New Zealand international rugby league footballer

Personal information
- Full name: Arnold Thomas Green
- Born: 21 May 1933 New Zealand
- Died: 23 September 2016 (aged 83) Coffs Harbour, New South Wales, Australia

Playing information
- Position: Wing, Centre
Club
Years	Team	Pld	T	G	FG	P
	Runanga
Representative
Years	Team	Pld	T	G	FG	P
	West Coast
1956	South Island
1956	New Zealand	0	0	0	0	0

Arnold Thomas Green (1932 or 1933 – 23 September 2016) was a New Zealand rugby league footballer who represented New Zealand.

== Playing career ==
Green played for Runanga in the West Coast Rugby League competition and also represented the West Coast. In 1955 he played for the West Coast against France.

In 1956, Green impressed for the South Island during the inter-island selection match. He was subsequently selected by the New Zealand national rugby league team for their tour of Australia. He became Kiwi #364 and, while he did not play in any test matches, he played in seven of the 15 games on tour and scored seven tries.

== Later years ==
Green was a coal miner who worked on the West Coast and in Huntly.

Green died at Coffs Harbour, New South Wales, Australia, on 23 September 2016, aged 83.
