= Bill Hattaway =

New Zealand international rugby league footballer

Personal information
- Full name: Leonard Vincent Hattaway
- Born: 29 May 1931 (age 93); Kaitaia, Northland Region, New Zealand

Playing information
- Position: Second-row
Club
Years	Team	Pld	T	G	FG	P
	Otahuhu
Representative
Years	Team	Pld	T	G	FG	P
	Auckland
1959	New Zealand	0	0	0	0	0
1960	New Zealand Māori	1

Leonard Vincent "Bill" Hattaway is a New Zealand former professional rugby league footballer who played in the 1950s and 1960s. He played at representative level for New Zealand, and at club level for Otahuhu, as a second-row.

== Playing career ==
Hattaway played for Otahuhu in the Auckland Rugby League competition and also represented Auckland. On 13 September 1958 he was part of the Otahuhu side that played in the first-ever Auckland Rugby League grand final, losing 9–13 to Ponsonby.

In 1959 he was selected for the New Zealand national rugby league team squad that toured Australia. He became Kiwi #392; however, he did not play in any test matches on tour.

In 1960 he played for New Zealand Māori against the touring French side.
