= Roy Moore (rugby league) =

New Zealand international rugby league player (1928–2022)

Personal information
- Born: Roy Lance Moore; 28 July 1928; Westmere, Auckland, New Zealand
- Died: 20 April 2022 (aged 93); Mount Eden, Auckland, New Zealand

Playing information
- Weight: 82 kg (12 st 13 lb)
- Position: Fullback
Club
Years	Team	Pld	T	G	FG	P
	Mount Albert
Representative
Years	Team	Pld	T	G	FG	P
	Auckland
1952–1956	New Zealand	5	1	5	0	13

Roy Lance Moore (28 July 1928 – 20 April 2022) was a New Zealand rugby league player. A fullback, Moore represented Auckland at a provincial level, and was a member of the New Zealand national team, the Kiwis, between 1952 and 1956.

== Early life and family ==
Moore was born in the Auckland suburb of Westmere on 28 July 1928. His parents were Edna Gretchen Moore (née Culpan) and Cyril Alfred Moore.

== Playing career ==
Moore played for the Mount Albert club in Auckland, and played representative football for Auckland. He was a member of the Kiwis team that toured Australia in 1952, playing in four games on that tour and kicking 20 goals. In 1953, he was a guest player for the American All Stars during the New Zealand portion of their tour of Australasia. Moore played in two Tests for the Kiwis in 1955, against the touring French side. He scored all of New Zealand's points — a try and three goals — in the first Test, which was won by France 19–6, and kicked two goals in the second Test, won 11–6 by New Zealand. Moore was subsequently selected for the 1955–56 tour of Great Britain and France, and appeared in three of the six Test matches and 10 other games on that tour.

== Later life and death ==
Moore died in the Auckland suburb of Mount Eden on 20 April 2022, at the age of 93. He had been predeceased by his wife of 57 years, Nancy (née Eccles), in 2020.
