= Les McNichol =

New Zealand international rugby league footballer

Les McNicol
Personal information
- Full name: Leslie John McNicol
- Born: 9 March 1932; Greymouth, New Zealand
- Died: 16 February 2013 (aged 80); Greymouth, New Zealand

Playing information
- Height: 6 ft 3 in (1.91 m)
- Position: Wing
Representative
Years	Team	Pld	T	G	FG	P
	West Coast
1955–56	New Zealand	13	6			18

Les McNicol (9 March 1932 – 16 February 2013) was a New Zealand rugby league player who represented New Zealand on the 1955–56 tour of Great Britain and France.
