= Ossie Butt =

New Zealand international rugby league footballer

Personal information
- Full name: Osmond William Butt
- Born: 7 February 1934; Stratford, New Zealand
- Died: 23 February 2002 (aged 68); Waikanae, New Zealand

Playing information
- Position: Second-row
Representative
Years	Team	Pld	T	G	FG	P
≤1956–≥56	Wellington
1956	New Zealand	0	0	0	0	0

Osmond William Butt (7 February 1934 – 23 February 2002) was a New Zealand professional rugby league footballer who played in the 1950s. He played at representative level for New Zealand, and Wellington, as a second-row.

== Playing career ==
=== International honours ===
Butt represented New Zealand in 1956 against Australia.
