= Kevin Pearce (rugby league) =

New Zealand international rugby league footballer and coach

Personal information
- Full name: Kevin Charles Pearce
- Born: 23 March 1936 (age 90) Christchurch, New Zealand

Playing information
- Position: Second-row
Club
Years	Team	Pld	T	G	FG	P
	Papanui (CRL)
Representative
Years	Team	Pld	T	G	FG	P
19??–62	Canterbury
1957	New Zealand	1	0	0	0	0
1959	South Island	1	0	5	0	10

Coaching information
Club
Years	Team	Gms	W	D	L	W%
1968–69	Papanui (CRL)

Kevin Pearce is a New Zealand former rugby league footballer who represented New Zealand in the 1957 World Cup.

== Playing career ==
Pearce played for the Papanui club in the Canterbury Rugby League competition and also represented Canterbury. He was selected for the New Zealand national rugby league team in 1957 as a 21-year-old and played in the 1957 World Cup.

He played for the South Island against the North Island in 1959, kicking five goals, however a shoulder injury meant he was unavailable for the national trial match. He continued to represent Canterbury until 1962.

== Later years ==
In 1968 and 1969 Pearce coached Papanui in the Canterbury Rugby League competition.
