= Ian Grey (rugby league) =

New Zealand international rugby league footballer, coach and administrator

Personal information
- Full name: Ian Neville Grey
- Born: 6 April 1931; Auckland, New Zealand
- Died: 9 July 2009 (aged 78); Blairgowrie, Victoria, Australia

Playing information
- Position: Fullback, Second-row, Loose forward
Club
Years	Team	Pld	T	G	FG	P
1948	Richmond	3
1948–56	Point Chevalier
1957–58	Northern Districts
	Total	3	0	0	0	0
Representative
Years	Team	Pld	T	G	FG	P
1951–58	Auckland
1954	North Island
1954–56	New Zealand	3	2	0	0	6

Coaching information
Club
Years	Team	Gms	W	D	L	W%
1958	Northern Districts
1967–68	Ponsonby
	Total	0	0	0	0
Representative
Years	Team	Gms	W	D	L	W%
1967–68	Auckland
- Father: Eric Grey

Ian Neville Grey (6 April 1931 – 7 July 2009) was a New Zealand rugby league footballer who represented New Zealand in the 1954 World Cup.

== Early life ==
Born in Auckland in 1931, Grey was the son of New Zealand rugby league representative Eric Grey and was a noted tennis player in his youth.

== Playing career ==
Grey played in the Auckland Rugby League competition as a loose forward, first playing three games for Richmond in 1948 before moving to Point Chevalier between 1948 and 1956. He then captained Northern Districts in 1957 and was captain-coach in 1958. Northern Districts was a combination of North Shore and Northcote.

Grey represented Auckland from 1951 to 1958 and the North Island in 1954. He first played for the New Zealand national rugby league team at the 1954 World Cup, playing in one test at fullback. He also played two test matches on the 1955-1956 tour of Great Britain and France.

== Coaching career ==
Grey coached Ponsonby to runners-up in the 1967 Auckland Rugby League championship before winning the competition in 1968. He also coached Auckland between 1967 and 1968.

== Later years ==
Grey later moved to Australia and served as the Victorian Rugby League Chairman between 1988 and 1993. He died in Blairgowrie, Victoria, on 7 July 2009 after a short battle with cancer.
