= Duncan MacRae (rugby league) =

New Zealand rugby league footballer (1934–2019)

Personal information
- Full name: Duncan Ross MacRae
- Born: 14 April 1934
- Died: 2 May 2019 (aged 85) Auckland, New Zealand

Playing information
- Position: Prop
Representative
Years	Team	Pld	T	G	FG	P
1956	New Zealand	3	0	0	0	0

Duncan Ross MacRae (14 April 1934 – 2 May 2019) was a New Zealand rugby league footballer. A prop, he was a member of the Kiwis on their 1956 tour of Australia, playing in three tests.

MacRae was born on 14 April 1934, and died in Auckland on 2 May 2019.
