= Reese Griffiths =

New Zealand international rugby league footballer

Personal information
- Full name: Reese Kenneth Griffiths
- Born: 25 December 1937 New Zealand
- Died: 16 September 2016 (aged 78) Greymouth, New Zealand

Playing information
- Position: Wing, Centre
Club
Years	Team	Pld	T	G	FG	P
	Runanga (WCRL)
Representative
Years	Team	Pld	T	G	FG	P
1954–64	West Coast
1956	South Island
1957–63	New Zealand	11	1	0	0	3

Reese Kenneth Griffiths (25 December 1937 – 16 September 2016) was a New Zealand rugby league player who represented New Zealand in the 1957 and 1960 World Cups.

== Playing career ==
Griffiths played in the outside backs for Runanga in the West Coast Rugby League competition. He represented the West Coast between 1954 and 1964, and the South Island in 1965.

He was first selected for the New Zealand national rugby league team in 1957 and attended the World Cup that year as an injury replacement for Neville Denton. Griffiths went on to play in eleven test matches for the Kiwis between 1957 and 1963, including at the 1960 World Cup. He finished his international career having played in 35 games and scored 18 tries for New Zealand.

In 1960 Griffiths was also involved in the West Coast side that won the Northern Union Cup from Auckland.

== Personal life ==
Griffiths worked in the West Coast mines and also owned a commercial fishing boat. He is commemorated in a mural on the side of a Runanga dairy, alongside George Menzies and Bernie Green.

Griffiths died in Greymouth on 16 September 2016.
