= Dick Haggie =

New Zealand & United States international rugby league footballer

Personal information
- Full name: Richard Haggie
- Born: 8 October 1933 New Zealand
- Died: 15 July 2005 (aged 71) New Zealand

Playing information
- Position: Fullback, Wing
Club
Years	Team	Pld	T	G	FG	P
	Otahuhu
Representative
Years	Team	Pld	T	G	FG	P
	Auckland
1953	American All Stars
1955	New Zealand Māori
1955–56	New Zealand	4	1	10	0	23

Richard Haggie (8 October 1933 – 15 July 2005) was a New Zealand rugby league player who represented New Zealand.

== Playing career ==
Haggie played at wing and fullback and represented Auckland.

In 1953 the touring American All Stars arrived in New Zealand. Short on players after a long tour of Australia, Haggie was one of the replacements called in to join the squad.

Haggie played for the New Zealand Māori in 1955, being part of the side that defeated the touring French squad 28–20. He was also part of the Auckland side that defeated France 17–15.

Haggie was then selected for the New Zealand national rugby league team 1955–56 tour of Great Britain and France. He played in one test against Great Britain and all three tests against France.

In 1958, Haggie was part of the Otahuhu Leopards side that played in the first ever Auckland Rugby League grand final, losing 7–16 to Ponsonby.
