= Trevor Kilkelly =

New Zealand international rugby league footballer

Personal information
- Full name: Trevor Thomas Kilkelly
- Born: 8 October 1930 New Zealand
- Died: 17 September 1997 (aged 66)

Playing information
- Position: Hooker, Second-row
Club
Years	Team	Pld	T	G	FG	P
	Brunner
19??–57	Sydenham
1957–63	Brunner
1964	Manly-Warringah
	Total	0	0	0	0	0
Representative
Years	Team	Pld	T	G	FG	P
1952–57	Canterbury
1953–??	South Island	6
1955–60	New Zealand	11	0	0	0	0
1957–63	West Coast

Trevor Kilkelly is a New Zealand former rugby league footballer who represented New Zealand in the 1960 World Cup.

== Playing career ==
Kilkelly grew up on the West Coast playing for the Brunner club. He was named as the West Coast's reserve hooker when only 17 years old.

Kilkelly later moved to join the Sydenham club in the Canterbury Rugby League competition and made his representative debut for Canterbury in 1952 and his South Island debut in 1953. That year he was also an unused reserve for New Zealand but it would not be until 1955 when he made his debut for New Zealand, playing on the tour of Great Britain and France. During the 1955 season Kilkelly had switched positions from hooker to the second row.

He captained Canterbury in 1956 and played home tests against Great Britain in 1958 and France in 1960. He also toured Australia in 1959 and went to Great Britain as part of the 1960 World Cup squad. He retired from international football after the World Cup, having played in 30 games including eleven test matches.

Midway through the 1957 season Kilkelly had returned the Brunner club in the West Coast Rugby League competition and he finally represented his home province in 1957. He went on the play for the West Coast until 1963 when he left for Australia, playing the 1964 season with the Manly-Warringah Sea Eagles.
