= Keith Bell (rugby league, born 1934) =

New Zealand international rugby league footballer and coach

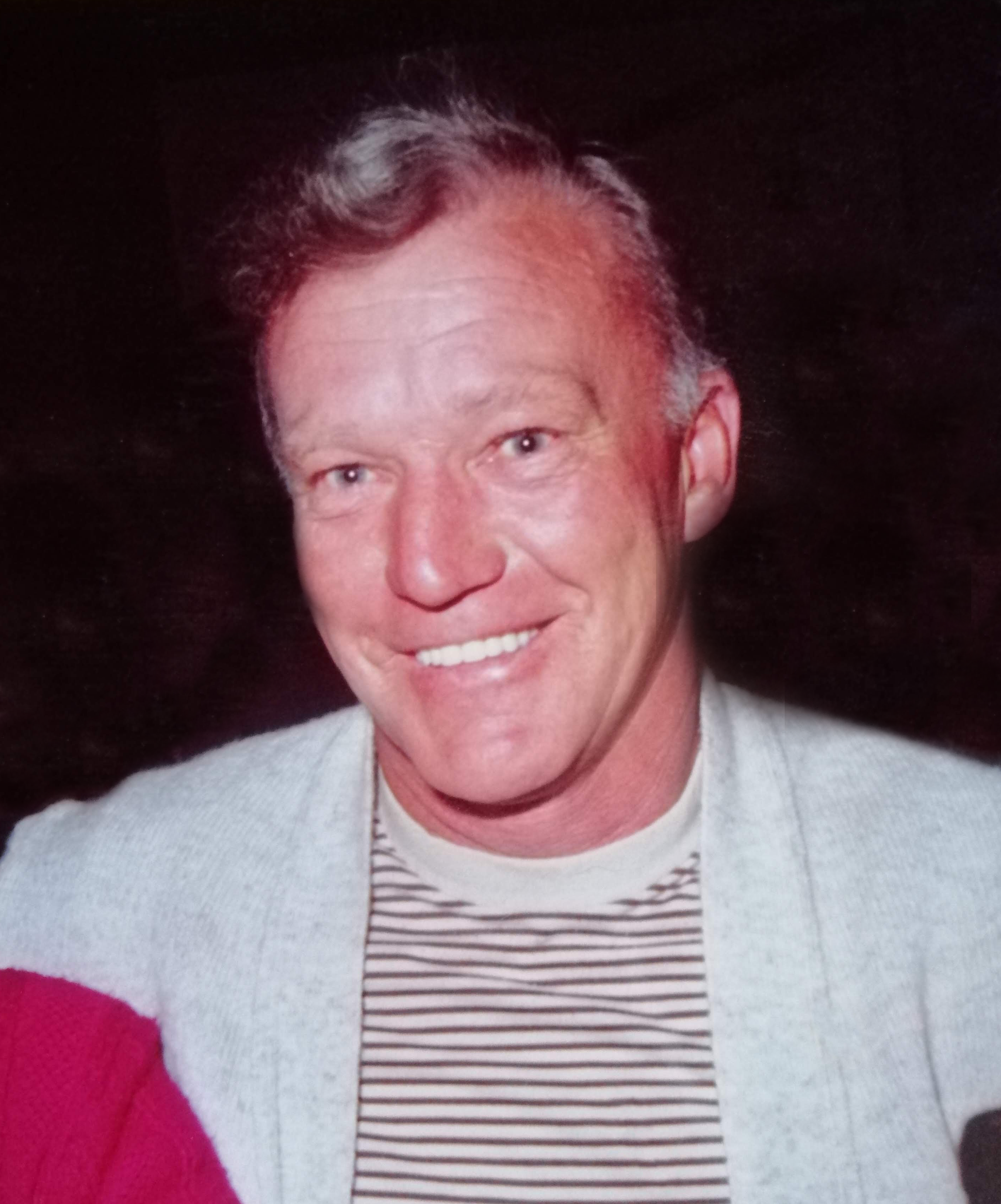
- Keith Bell in the 1970s

Personal information
- Full name: Keith George Bell
- Born: 8 October 1934; Auckland, New Zealand
- Died: 18 December 2017 (aged 83); Auckland, New Zealand

Playing information
- Position: Utility, Centre
Club
Years	Team	Pld	T	G	FG	P
195?–60	Ponsonby Ponies
1960–63	Central Districts
1963–68	Ponsonby Ponies
1968–??	Northcote
	Total	0	0	0	0	0
Representative
Years	Team	Pld	T	G	FG	P
1955–1958	Auckland
1957	New Zealand	0	0	0	0	0

Keith George Bell was a New Zealand former rugby league footballer who represented New Zealand in the 1957 World Cup. He played for and coached numerous sides and was heavily involved with the Ponsonby Ponies.

== Early life ==
Bell was raised in Ponsonby, Auckland and attended Ponsonby Primary School and Seddon Memorial Technical College.

In 1954, he received a New Zealand Certificate of Due Completion of Apprenticeship and became a qualified carpenter.

== Playing career ==
Bell played for the Ponsonby Ponies in the Auckland Rugby League competition. In 1955 he was selected for Auckland and was part of the side that defeated the touring French side 17–15. In 1956 he toured the South Island with Auckland and in 1957 he was selected for the New Zealand national rugby league team (Kiwis) squad for the 1957 World Cup. Bell didn't play in a game at the tournament, however he was retrospectively described to someone who "might have been a valuable interchange player". Later on he was numbered Kiwi 382.

In 1958 Bell was part of the Auckland Rugby League's first ever Fox Memorial Grand Final, where the Ponsonby Ponies defeated Otahuhu 16–7. The same year, Ponsonby also won the Rukutai Shield. These victories were followed by a Stormont Shield match against Marist where Ponsonby lost 22–29. Bell was sent off near the end of the match after disputing the referee's decision to send off teammate Joe Rātima.

He again toured the South Island with Auckland that year beating West Coast 31–11 and Canterbury 36–15, and was part of the Auckland side that lost 17–24 to Great Britain.

In 1968 Bell left Ponsonby to become a player-coach at Northcote.

== Later life ==
After retiring Bell coached many sides including the Ponsonby Ponies and Northcote. He was later the chairman for the Ponsonby Ponies. Bell stayed actively involved in rugby league for Ponsonby playing Golden Oldies into his 70s. In 2008 he helped organise the club's centenary - founded in 1908, the Ponsonby Ponies are the oldest rugby league club in New Zealand.
