= Jock Butterfield =

NZ international rugby league footballer

Personal information
- Full name: John Rutherford Butterfield
- Born: 18 January 1932 Taylorville, New Zealand
- Died: 14 February 2004 (aged 72) Brisbane, Queensland, Australia

Playing information
- Position: Hooker, Second-row, Prop
Club
Years	Team	Pld	T	G	FG	P
19??–??	Brunner
1953–57	Sydenham
1958–63	Brunner
1964	Manly-Warringah	10	0	0	0	0
1965	Leeton
1966–69	Mount Isa
1970–72	Cloncurry
	Total	10	0	0	0	0
Representative
Years	Team	Pld	T	G	FG	P
1953–57	Canterbury
1953–62	South Island
1954–63	New Zealand	36	7	0	0	21
1958–63	West Coast

John Rutherford "Jock" Butterfield (18 January 1932 – 14 February 2004) was a New Zealand rugby league footballer who played in the 1950s and 1960s. He was named amongst the finest that New Zealand produced during the 20th century. A New Zealand international representative forward, he played his club football in various places in New Zealand, New South Wales and Queensland. Butterfield held the record for most test caps for the New Zealand national team until overtaken by Gary Freeman. In 2007 he was named at hooker in New Zealand's rugby league team of the century.

== New Zealand ==
Born in Taylorville, on the West Coast of New Zealand's South Island, Butterfield played at the nearby township of Brunner's rugby league club and also represented the West Coast.

Butterfield then moved to Christchurch, playing for the Sydenham club in the Canterbury Rugby League from 1953 and also representing Canterbury. At this time he was first selected to represent New Zealand at Greymouth's Wingham Park, scoring a try in the 20-14 second test win over Great Britain. During the 1954 Great Britain Lions tour's New Zealand leg Butterfield played in the 2nd and 3rd Test matches. He went on to play for the Kiwis in the first Rugby League World Cup in 1954 as a second-row forward. Touring Great Britain and France with the Kiwis in the winter of 1955-56, Butterfield switched to hooker and was also selected to go on the 1956 New Zealand rugby league tour of Australia, playing in all three test matches. He appeared at the next World Cup in 1957 as well.

Butterfield returned to the West Coast in 1958 to work in the coal mines. Rejoining Brunner Rugby League Club, he captain-coached the side to the Thacker Shield championship that year. Also, during the 1958 Great Britain Lions tour's New Zealand leg, Butterfield played in both test matches. The following year he was selected to go on the 1959 New Zealand rugby league tour of Australia. In 1960 he played for New Zealand in another World Cup.

Butterfield was selected to go on the 1961 Kangaroo tour of New Zealand, playing in the first of the two test matches. He led Brunner to another championship in 1963 and also toured Australia. He'd been trying to join Australian club Manly-Warringah but the move was blocked by the NZRL. Butterfield played his final test for the Kiwis that year. He had played in 99 games, including 36 tests, for New Zealand, a record that still stands.

== Australia ==
After being cleared to do so by the NZRL, in 1964 Butterfield signed with NSWRFL Premiership side Manly-Warringah and moved to Australia at the age of 32. After one season with the Sydney club he moved to the country, where he captain-coached Leeton in the Reverina competition. In 1965, Butterfield, along with the rest of the Manly-Warringah, visited the USA Rugby League for an exhibition match against the St. Louis Bombers Rugby Football Club. Butterfield ended up playing in the Foley Shield competition for Mount Isa and Cloncurry in Queensland's outback until his retirement in the early 1970s.

Butterfield remained in Queensland and in 2001 was inducted as one of the NZRL's Legends of League. He died in Brisbane on 14 February 2004 aged 72. A regional Queensland youth rugby league tournament was named after him.
