= John Yates (rugby league) =

NZ international rugby league footballer

- Full name: John Edward Yates
- Born: 19 March 1930 Kaitaia, New Zealand
- Died: 23 July 2003 (aged 73) Auckland, New Zealand
- Notable relative: Victor Yates (brother)

Rugby union career
Senior career
Years	Team	Apps	(Points)
–	Rarawa		
Provincial / State sides
Years	Team	Apps	(Points)
1952	North Auckland		
- Rugby league career

Playing information
- Position: Prop, Second-row
Club
Years	Team	Pld	T	G	FG	P
	Otahuhu
Representative
Years	Team	Pld	T	G	FG	P
	Auckland
1954–57	New Zealand	6	0	0	0	0

John Yates was a New Zealand rugby league footballer who represented New Zealand in two World Cups.

His brother, Victor, was a New Zealand rugby union representative and played rugby league for Auckland while his father, Moses, represented North Auckland in rugby union.

== Playing career ==
Yates originally played rugby union, playing his first senior game for Rarawa and was chosen for North Auckland.

In 1953 Yates switched codes and he quickly became an Auckland representative and first played for the New Zealand national rugby league team in 1954. He was part of both the 1954 and 1957 World Cup squads.

In 1958 he was part of Auckland Rugby League's first ever Grand Final, being part of the Otahuhu Leopards side that lost 7-16 to Ponsonby.
