= Pat Creedy =

NZ international rugby league footballer

Personal information
- Full name: Patrick Joseph Creedy
- Born: 18 November 1927 New Zealand
- Died: 7 April 2011 (aged 83) Wyndham, New Zealand

Playing information

Rugby union
- Position: Halfback
Club
Years	Team	Pld	T	G	FG	P
	Southland
	Canterbury
	Total	0	0	0	0	0

Rugby league
- Position: Fullback, Scrum-half
Club
Years	Team	Pld	T	G	FG	P
	Marist (CRL)
Representative
Years	Team	Pld	T	G	FG	P
	Canterbury
1955–56	South Island
1955–57	New Zealand	9	0	6	0	12

Patrick Joseph Creedy (18 November 1927 – 7 April 2011) was a New Zealand rugby football player who represented New Zealand in rugby league.

== Playing career ==
Creedy originally played rugby union and represented both the Southland Rugby Union and the Canterbury Rugby Union.

Creedy later switched codes to rugby league and joined the Marist club in the Canterbury Rugby League competition. He represented Canterbury and in 1955 was selected at halfback for the South Island. That year he was first selected for the New Zealand national rugby league team, playing against the French and touring Great Britain and France.

In 1956 he was selected at fullback for the South Island and in 1957 he was selected for the Kiwis squad for the 1957 World Cup. Creedy finished his career with 33 games for the Kiwis, including nine test matches. He scored four tries and 12 goals for New Zealand.

Creedy died on 7 April 2011 in Wyndham, aged 83.
