= Keith Roberts (rugby league) =

NZ international rugby league footballer

Personal information
- Full name: Norman Keith Roberts
- Born: 28 January 1932; New Zealand
- Died: 11 March 2015 (aged 83); Ohoka, New Zealand

Playing information
- Weight: 64 kg (10 st 1 lb)
- Position: Scrum-half
Club
Years	Team	Pld	T	G	FG	P
19??–56	Marist (CRL)
1957–62	Papanui (CRL)
	Unknown (NSWCRL)
	Total	0	0	0	0	0
Representative
Years	Team	Pld	T	G	FG	P
1953–60	Canterbury
1954–60	South Island	5
1955–60	New Zealand	13	3	0	0	9

Coaching information
Club
Years	Team	Gms	W	D	L	W%
	Papanui (CRL)
	Unknown (NSWCRL)
	Total	0	0	0	0
Representative
Years	Team	Gms	W	D	L	W%
1962–??	Canterbury

Norman Keith Roberts (28 January 1932 – 11 March 2015) was a New Zealand rugby league footballer who represented New Zealand in the 1960 World Cup.

== Playing career ==
Roberts played for Marist in the Canterbury Rugby League competition. He debuted for Canterbury in 1953 and the South Island in 1954. In 1955 he was first selected for the New Zealand national rugby league team for a tour of Great Britain and France. He was chosen for New Zealand Māori in 1956 but withdrew due to injury. He moved to Papanui in 1957 and later became their player-coach.

He captained Canterbury between 1958 and 1960. He was part of the Kiwis tours of Australia in 1956 and 1959 and in 1960 was part of the World Cup squad. He retired from representative football after the 1960 season having played in thirty five games for New Zealand, including thirteen test matches.

Roberts continued to play for Papanui until he retired in 1962. He then coached Canterbury to a victory over Auckland in 1962. Roberts was later a player-coach in the New South Wales Country before returning to again coach Canterbury. He was later a New Zealand Schoolboys selector and coach.

He died at Ohoka on 11 March 2015, aged 83.
