= Joe Rātima =

New Zealand international rugby league player

Personal information
- Full name: Hohepa Joe Rātima
- Born: New Zealand

Playing information
- Weight: 16 st 0 lb (102 kg)

Rugby union
Representative
Years	Team	Pld	T	G	FG	P
	King Country
	New Zealand Māori

Rugby league
- Position: Prop
Club
Years	Team	Pld	T	G	FG	P
	Ponsonby
Representative
Years	Team	Pld	T	G	FG	P
	Auckland
1956	New Zealand Māori
1958–59	New Zealand	4	1	0	0	3

Hohepa Joe Rātima (birth unknown) is a New Zealand rugby union and professional rugby league footballer who played representative rugby league (RL) for New Zealand.

== Rugby union career ==
Rātima is from Ngāti Maniapoto and originally played rugby union, representing King Country Rugby Union. He also represented New Zealand Māori.

== Rugby league career ==
He then switched to rugby league, representing Auckland. In 1956 he was part of the Auckland sides that defeated Great Britain 5–4 in 1954 and France 17–15 in 1955.

In 1956 he toured Australia as part of the New Zealand Māori rugby league team.

He was part of the Ponsonby team that won the Auckland Rugby League title in 1958.

He represented New Zealand, playing in two tests against Great Britain in 1958 and then touring Australia in 1959.

== Later years ==
Rātima was later the vice president of the Māori Rugby League organisation.
