= Jim Riddell =

New Zealand international rugby league footballer

Personal information
- Full name: Charles James Riddell
- Born: 10 March 1930 New Zealand
- Died: 26 February 2012 (aged 81)

Playing information
- Position: Second-row, Loose forward
Club
Years	Team	Pld	T	G	FG	P
	Richmond
Representative
Years	Team	Pld	T	G	FG	P
1953–60	Auckland
1955–57	New Zealand	9	1	0	0	3

Charles James Riddell (10 March 1930 – 26 February 2012) is a New Zealand rugby league player who represented New Zealand in the 1957 World Cup.

== Playing career ==
Riddell played in the Auckland Rugby League competition and first represented Auckland in 1953 against the American All Stars side. He was first selected for the 1955 series against France and toured Great Britain and France later that year. He also toured Australia in 1956 and was part of the 1957 World Cup squad. He played in nine test matches for the Kiwis between 1955 and 1957.

In 1960 Riddell was part of the Auckland side that defeated France 14–5 at Carlaw Park.
