= Rex Percy =

NZ international rugby league footballer

Personal information
- Full name: Rex William Percy
- Born: 26 January 1934 Thames, New Zealand
- Died: 2 May 2015 (aged 81) Golden Beach, Queensland, Australia

Playing information
- Height: 188 cm (6 ft 2 in)
- Weight: 83.5 kg (13 st 2 lb)

Rugby union
Club
Years	Team	Pld	T	G	FG	P
	Thames Valley

Rugby league
- Position: Loose forward
Club
Years	Team	Pld	T	G	FG	P
	Ponsonby
1961–63	Balmain Tigers		3	8	0	25
	Total	0	3	8	0	25
Representative
Years	Team	Pld	T	G	FG	P
	Auckland
1955–59	New Zealand	9	5	2	0	19

Rex William Percy (26 January 1934 – 2 May 2015) was a New Zealand rugby union and professional rugby league footballer who played representative rugby league for New Zealand in the 1957 World Cup.

== Playing career ==
Born in Thames, Percy originally played rugby union. He played for the Thames High School first XV and also represented the Thames Valley Rugby Football Union. His father, Bill Percy, had also been a Thames Valley representative.

Percy played for the Ponsonby club in the Auckland Rugby League competition and was an Auckland representative. In 1955 he was first selected for the New Zealand national rugby league team, touring Great Britain and France. He was again named for the Kiwis in 1957, being part of the World Cup squad that year.

In 1958 Percy was part of the first ever Grand Final in the Auckland Rugby League competition, which Ponsonby won 16–7. He also toured the South Island with Auckland and played for the Kiwis against Great Britain that year. 1959 was his last year in a Kiwis jersey and he toured Australia.

Percy played in nine test matches during his career and scored 19 test points for New Zealand. In total, Percy scored 31 tries in 39 games for the Kiwis between 1955 and 59. No forward has scored more tries in a black jersey and he also kicked goals.

In 1961 Percy joined the Balmain Tigers in the New South Wales Rugby League competition. He played for the Tigers for three seasons and scored 25 points during this time. He then played for Parkes and Yass before retiring in 1966. His son, Matthew Percy, represented Australia in the America's Cup and at the 1988 Summer Olympics.

He died at Golden Beach, Queensland on 2 May 2015.
