= George P. Turner =

New Zealand international rugby league footballer

George Turner
Personal information
- Full name: George Puhoi Turner
- Born: 25 November 1931; Te Awamutu, Waikato, New Zealand
- Died: 1 January 2013 (aged 81)

Playing information
- Position: Centre
Representative
Years	Team	Pld	T	G	FG	P
1956–61	Auckland
1957–61	New Zealand	13	2	0	0	6

George Puhoi Turner is a New Zealand former professional rugby league footballer who represented New Zealand in the 1957 and 1960 World Cups.

== Playing career ==
Turner played in the Auckland Rugby League competition and was first selected to represent Auckland in 1956 in a tour of the South Island.

He was first selected for the New Zealand national rugby league team in the squad for the 1957 World Cup. He remained a regular in the squad until 1961, playing in 13 tests including test series against Great Britain, Australia, France and the 1960 World Cup. His last test match was against Australia in 1961.

Turner was part of the Auckland sides that toured the South Island in 1958, defeated France 14-5 at Carlaw Park in 1960 and defeated Australia 13-8 at the same venue in 1961.
