= Vern Bakalich =

New Zealand international rugby league footballer

Personal information
- Full name: Vernon Andrew Neville Bakalich
- Born: 8 July 1929 New Zealand
- Died: 21 November 2015 (aged 86) Whakatāne, New Zealand

Playing information
- Position: Wing
Club
Years	Team	Pld	T	G	FG	P
	Richmond
Representative
Years	Team	Pld	T	G	FG	P
1952–1958	Auckland
1953–57	New Zealand	13	3	0	0	9

Vernon Andrew Neville Bakalich (8 July 1929 – 21 November 2015) was a New Zealand rugby league player who represented New Zealand in the 1957 World Cup.

== Playing career ==
Bakalich played for Richmond in the Auckland Rugby League competition and was an Auckland representative. He was first selected for the New Zealand national rugby league team in 1953 in a test series against Australia. Bakalich played in the 1954 test series against Great Britain but was not selected for the inaugural World Cup later that year.

In 1955 Bakalich returned to the side, touring Great Britain and France. Bakalich scored a then record twenty six tries in 30 games while on tour. He toured Australia in 1956 and was part of the squad for the 1957 World Cup. His last appearance for the Kiwis was against France in 1958. In total he played in 42 games for New Zealand, including in 13 tests between 1954 and 1957.

In his final game for Auckland, in 1958, he scored a length-of-the-field try against the touring Great Britain side.

== Legacy ==
In 2013 he was named on the wing in the Richmond rugby league club's team of the century.

He died on 21 November 2015.
