= Sel Belsham =

New Zealand international rugby league footballer

Personal information
- Full name: Selwyn Eric Belsham
- Born: 26 September 1930 Auckland, New Zealand
- Died: 11 March 2016 (aged 85) Queensland, Australia

Playing information
- Position: Halfback
Club
Years	Team	Pld	T	G	FG	P
	Richmond
Representative
Years	Team	Pld	T	G	FG	P
	Auckland
1955–1957	North Island	3
1955–1957	New Zealand	10	2	0	0	6
1957	Rest of the World	1
- Cricket career

Cricket information
- Batting: Right-handed
- Role: Wicket-keeper

Domestic team information
- Years: Team
- 1953/54–1958/59: Auckland
- First-class debut: 6 March 1954 v Fiji
- Last First-class: 24 January 1959 v Northern Districts

Career statistics
Competition	First-class
Matches	6
Runs scored	105
Batting average	11.66
100s/50s	0/0
Top score	41
Catches/stumpings	13/4
- Source: CricketArchive, 26 March 2016
- Relatives: Vic Belsham (brother)

Selwyn Eric Belsham (28 September 1930 – 11 March 2016) was a New Zealand rugby league player who represented New Zealand at the 1957 World Cup. His position of preference was at Halfback. He also played cricket for Auckland.

His brother Vic was also a New Zealand national rugby league team representative. Vic later became a referee, controlling his brother's team in the 1957 World Cup. Their father Alf represented Auckland in rugby union.

== Sporting career ==
=== Rugby league ===
An Auckland representative, Belsham played for the Richmond club in the Auckland Rugby League competition. He represented the North Island on three occasions, in 1955, 1956 and 1957.

Belsham represented the New Zealand national rugby league team, playing 10 consecutive test matches between 1955 and 1957. He was first selected for the 1955 tour of Great Britain and France, but began the trip with a broken collarbone, suffered in New Zealand. He played in only two games during the England leg of the trip before making his test debut in the first test against France.

Belsham played for the Rest of the World against Australia after the 1957 World Cup. His final test match was for New Zealand against a combined Great Britain-France side.

=== Cricket ===
Belsham played six first-class cricket matches for Auckland as a wicket-keeper, taking 13 catches and four stumpings. With the bat, he scored 105 runs at an average of 11.66 and a high score of 41.

== Death ==
Belsham died in Queensland, Australia, on 11 March 2016.

== See also ==
- List of Auckland representative cricketers
