= Bill Sorensen =

NZ international rugby league footballer

Personal information
- Full name: William Sorensen
- Born: 6 April 1932 Utui, Vavaʻu, Tonga
- Died: 25 January 1996 (aged 63)

Playing information
- Position: Centre, Five-eighth
Club
Years	Team	Pld	T	G	FG	P
	Ponsonby
Representative
Years	Team	Pld	T	G	FG	P
	Auckland
1953–60	New Zealand	22	3	15	0	39
	New Zealand Māori

Coaching information
Club
Years	Team	Gms	W	D	L	W%
	Auckland
- Education: Takapuna Grammar School
- Relatives: Dane Sorensen (nephew); Kurt Sorensen (nephew); Scott Sorensen (grandson)

William Sorensen (6 April 1932 – 25 January 1996) was a New Zealand rugby league footballer who represented New Zealand in the 1954, 1957 and 1960 World Cups.

== Playing career ==
Sorensen was a member of the Ponsonby United Rugby League Club and represented Auckland.

He played in twenty four tests for the New Zealand national rugby league team, including seven games at the 1954, 1957 and 1960 World Cups. He was selected to go on the 1955–56 New Zealand rugby tour of Great Britain and France. After the 1957 World Cup Sorensen played for the Rest of the World against Australia.

Sorensen also represented the New Zealand Māori side. In this period, players of other Polynesian backgrounds were also selected for the team. He retired following the 1960 World Cup.

In 1963 Sorensen was player-coach for a New South Wales country team.

== Coaching career ==
Sorensen was the Auckland coach when they competed in the grand slam in 1977, defeating Australia, France and Great Britain in a three-week period.

He also served as a selector for the New Zealand national rugby league team.

== Personal life ==
Sorensen's brother Dave also played for the Kiwis as did two of his nephews; Dane and Kurt.

Sorensen died in 1996, leaving behind his widow Olga.

His daughter is Debbie Sorensen a prominent Pacific Health leader

Sorensen's grandson is Penrith Panthers and Kiwis forward Scott Sorensen.

== Legacy ==
Sorensen was made a life member of the New Zealand Rugby League in 1991.

He was inducted into the New Zealand Rugby League's "Legends of League" in 2000.
