= Tom Hadfield (rugby league) =

New Zealand international rugby league footballer (1934–2018)

Personal information
- Full name: Bernard Tom Hadfield
- Born: 11 December 1934
- Died: 16 May 2018 (aged 83) Birkenhead, New Zealand

Playing information
- Position: Wing
Club
Years	Team	Pld	T	G	FG	P
	Northern Districts
Representative
Years	Team	Pld	T	G	FG	P
	Auckland
1956–61	New Zealand	18	15	0	0	45
1957	Rest of the World	1

Bernard Tom Hadfield (11 December 1934 – 16 May 2018) was a New Zealand rugby league footballer who represented New Zealand in the 1957 and 1960 World Cups and retired as the highest try-scorer in the New Zealand national side's history.

== Playing career ==
A Northcote Tigers player, Hadfield was an Auckland representative. He was part of the Northcote club during the Auckland Rugby League's district era and so played for Northern Districts - an amalgamation of the Northcote and North Shore clubs.

Hadfield first made the New Zealand national rugby league team in 1956. He went on to play 15 Tests for the Kiwis, including at the 1957 and 1960 World Cups. After the 1960 World Cup Tom played for the Rest of the World vs Great Britain. He finished his career with a then-record 15 tries for the Kiwis, five more than the previous record. As of 2010 he is 6th equal highest try scorer for the Kiwis.

== Legacy and death ==
Hadfield was inducted into the New Zealand Rugby League's "Legends of League" in 2010. In 2009 he was named as a member of the New Zealand Rugby League Team of the Century and in 2010 he was made a Legends of Harbour by Harbour Sport.

Hadfield died in the Auckland suburb of Birkenhead on 16 May 2018, aged 83.
