= Cliff Johnson (rugby league) =

New Zealand rugby league footballer

Personal information
- Full name: Clifford Raymond Johnson
- Born: 27 October 1928
- Died: 27 July 2003 (aged 74)

Playing information
- Position: Prop, Second-row
Club
Years	Team	Pld	T	G	FG	P
19??	Richmond
Representative
Years	Team	Pld	T	G	FG	P
19??	Auckland
1950–60	New Zealand	34	4	0	0	12

Clifford Raymond Johnson (27 October 1928 – 27 July 2003) was a New Zealand rugby league footballer who has been named one of the finest the country produced during the 20th century. An international representative, he played mainly as a prop forward.

== Playing career ==
Johnson played for the Richmond Bulldogs in the Auckland Rugby League competition. From here he represented Auckland and New Zealand. Between 1950 and 1960 he played a total of 34 tests for New Zealand, a new record at the time of his retirement. He also played in three World Cup tournaments. Including minor tour matches, Johnson played a total of 70 matches for New Zealand.

During the 1951 French rugby league tour of Australia and New Zealand, Johnson was selected to play for both Auckland and New Zealand. Johnson was originally selected for the 1955–56 New Zealand rugby tour of Great Britain and France but withdrew and was replaced by Henry Maxwell.

He retired following the 1960 World Cup.

== Legacy ==
After retirement he was the foundation chairman of the Howick Rugby League Football Club.

Johnson was inducted as one of the New Zealand Rugby League's inaugural "Legends of League" in 1995.

After his death he was named as captain of the New Zealand national rugby league team of the century in 2007.
