= Henry Maxwell (rugby league) =

New Zealand international rugby league footballer

Personal information
- Full name: Henry Dudley Maxwell
- Born: 18 February 1932; New Zealand
- Died: 23 August 2013 (aged 81); Wagga Wagga, New South Wales, Australia

Playing information
- Position: Prop
Club
Years	Team	Pld	T	G	FG	P
	Point Chevalier
	Western United
	Total	0	0	0	0	0
Representative
Years	Team	Pld	T	G	FG	P
1953–??	Auckland
1955–60	New Zealand	20	5	0	0	15
1956	New Zealand Māori
1960	Rest of the World	1	0	0	0	0

Henry Dudley Maxwell (c.1932 – 23 August 2013) was a New Zealand rugby league footballer who represented New Zealand in the 1957 and 1960 World Cups.

== Biography ==
Maxwell played for the Point Chevalier Pirates in the Auckland Rugby League competition. He represented Auckland. He was selected to go on the 1955–56 New Zealand rugby tour of Great Britain and France. Maxwell played in a total of 20 tests for the Kiwis, including at the 1957 and 1960 World Cups. Henry played for the Rest of the World against Australia at the end of the World Cup.

He was made captain of the Auckland side in 1958. Maxwell played for Western United in the Auckland competition after Point Chevalier combined with Mount Albert.

Of Te Aupōuri descent, Maxwell captained the New Zealand Māori team on the 1956 tour of Australia.

He retired following the 1960 World Cup. He later moved to Batlow, New South Wales, Australia, where he coached the local rugby league team.

He died 23 August 2013 at Wagga Wagga at the age of 81.
