= George Menzies =

NZ international rugby league footballer and coach

Personal information
- Born: 30 September 1930 Greymouth, New Zealand
- Died: 16 March 2016 (aged 85) Greymouth, New Zealand

Playing information
- Position: Stand-off
Club
Years	Team	Pld	T	G	FG	P
	Runanga (WCRL)
Representative
Years	Team	Pld	T	G	FG	P
	West Coast
1949–62	South Island
1951–61	New Zealand	29	4	0	0	12
1960	Rest of the World	1	3	0	0	9

Coaching information
Representative
Years	Team	Gms	W	D	L	W%
	West Coast
1974–75	New Zealand	11	3	2	6	27

George Menzies (30 September 1930 – 16 March 2016) was a New Zealand rugby league player and coach who represented New Zealand at three World Cups and coached New Zealand at another World Cup. In 2007 he was named the greatest stand-off New Zealand had ever produced.

== Playing career ==
Menzies was a New Zealand schoolboys representative in 1946.

A Runanga club player, Menzies was a West Coast and South Island representative. Menzies played in 69 games, including twenty-nine test matches for the New Zealand national rugby league team, participating in three World Cups.

Menzies was selected to go on the 1955–56 New Zealand rugby tour of Great Britain and France.

He captained the Kiwis in a test during the 1956 tour to Australia before retiring from international football in 1961 after withdrawing from the 1961 New Zealand rugby league tour of Great Britain and France.

== Coaching career ==
At the end of his test career, in 1963, Menzies became a player-coach for Harden-Murrumburrah, a New South Wales country team. Before returning to New Zealand to coach the West Coast.

In 1974 and 1975 he was the coach of the Kiwis, taking the team to the 1975 World Cup.

== Legacy ==
His son, Chris, played for the Junior Kiwis and also represented the West Coast.

In 1989 Menzies was named as the West Coast Rugby League's best ever stand-off half.

Menzies was named one of New Zealand Rugby League's "Legends of League" in 1995.

In 2009 Menzies was named in the NZRL's team of the century.

Menzies died in Greymouth on 16 March 2016, aged 85.
