= 1957 Rugby League World Cup =

2nd Rugby League World Cup tournament

1957 World Cup
- Number of teams: 4
- Host country: Australia
- Winner: Australia (1st title)
- Matches played: 6
- Attendance: 215,059 (35,843 per match)
- Points scored: 204 (34 per match)
- Top scorer: (Australia) Brian Carlson (28)
- Top try scorers: (United Kingdom) Mick Sullivan (3) (Australia) Ian Moir (3) (Australia) Kel O'Shea (3)

The 1957 Rugby League World Cup was the second World Cup held for men’s national rugby league teams and was held between 15 and 25 June and hosted by Australia. Table toppers Australia were the winners as there was no Final at this World Cup.

Best and fairest awards were made to individual nations, the recipients being Gilbert Benausse (France), Brian Carlson (Australia), Phil Jackson (Great Britain) and Bill Sorensen (New Zealand).

== Background ==
1957 marked the 50th anniversary of rugby league in Australia, but the hosts were not confident of their ability to lift the trophy, having capitulated in the Ashes series in England barely seven months previously. Great Britain, under Alan Prescott, and boasting world-class backs such as Billy Boston, Mick Sullivan, Jeff Stevenson and Lewis Jones, and a formidable pack, were expected to win with Jacques Merquey's French side a dark horse.

Great Britain and France played an exhibition game in South Africa en-route to Australia for the tournament to boost awareness of the code there. A game in Benoni, believed to be the first professional rugby league ever played in the country, attracted a modest crowd of 15,000 was won by Great Britain 61 points to 41. The code had struggled to catch on in South Africa and was not reported on much by local newspapers. Ludwig Japhet, a Johannesburg lawyer, promoted the match and publicly claimed that South African rugby union officials feared the introduction of rugby league into the country.

== Referees ==
Referee Vic Belsham from New Zealand controlled three matches at the World Cup, including controlling one of New Zealand's matches. New Zealand included his brother Sel at halfback.

== Venues ==
Sydney	Brisbane
Sydney Cricket Ground	The Gabba
Capacity: 70,000	Capacity: 48,000

== Results ==
Team	Pld	W	D	L	PF	PA	PD	Pts	Result
Australia	3	3	0	0	82	20	+62	6	World Cup Winners
Great Britain	3	1	0	2	50	65	−15	2	
New Zealand	3	1	0	2	44	60	−16	2	
France	3	1	0	2	28	59	−31	2	

15 June

Australia	25 – 5	New Zealand

The Gabba, Brisbane
Attendance: 29,636

15 June

France	5 – 23	Great Britain
	Program

Sydney Cricket Ground, Sydney
Attendance: 50,007

17 June

Australia	31 – 6	Great Britain
	Program; Report

Sydney Cricket Ground, Sydney
Attendance: 57,995

17 June

France	14 – 10	New Zealand

The Gabba, Brisbane
Attendance: 28,000

22 June

Australia	26 – 9	France
	Program

Sydney Cricket Ground, Sydney
Attendance: 35,158

25 June

Great Britain	21 – 29	New Zealand
	Program; Report

Sydney Cricket Ground, Sydney
Attendance: 14,263

== Try scorers ==
3

- (Australia) Ian Moir
- (Australia) Kel O'Shea
- (United Kingdom) Mick Sullivan

2

- (Australia) Brian Carlson
- (Australia) Ken McCaffery
- (Australia) Harry Wells
- (France) Jean Foussat
- (United Kingdom) Phil Jackson
- (New Zealand) Tom Hadfield

1

- (Australia) Brian Clay
- (Australia) Bill Marsh
- (Australia) Dick Poole
- (Australia) Norm Provan
- (France) Gilbert Benausse
- (France) Jacques Merquey
- (United Kingdom) Billy Boston
- (United Kingdom) Jack Grundy
- (United Kingdom) Lewis Jones
- (United Kingdom) Sid Little
- (United Kingdom) Jeffrey Stevenson
- (New Zealand) Cliff Johnson
- (New Zealand) Bill McLennan
- (New Zealand) George Menzies
- (New Zealand) Jim Riddell
- (New Zealand) Bill Sorensen
- (New Zealand) George Turner
