= North Island rugby league team =

New Zealand rugby league team

Club information
- Colours: Black and White

Current details
- Ground: Carlaw Park, Auckland

The North Island rugby league team is a rugby league team that represents the North Island of New Zealand. They first played in 1920 against the touring England team in Napier, Hawke's Bay. However the primary purpose of the side was to play against the South Island team, with the match often serving as a trial type match to choose the New Zealand international side.

== Inter island matches ==
=== 1920 ===
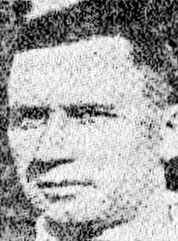
Ernie Herring (Maritime)

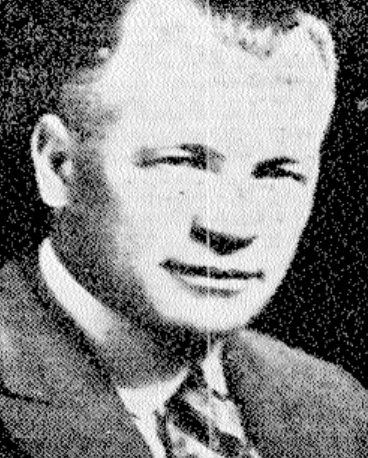
Norm Loveridge (Marist)

The England team was touring New Zealand following their tour of Australia where they had played 13 matches. They played Auckland, Rotorua, South Auckland (Waikato), New Zealand, and King Country, before a match was organised for them against a North Island team at Napier in the Hawke's Bay on August 4. The North Island team was relatively weak with only 8 of the 13 players chosen being New Zealand representatives when ordinarily the entire side would have been national representatives. The side included 5 local Hawke's Bay players (Pat Burrows, Edmund Downing, Percival Exeter, Con McCarthy, and Henry Pring). Aside from a loss to Auckland in their first game the England side made short work of all domestic opposition, including this North Island side who they thrashed 46-5.

4 August	North Island	5-46	England	McLean Park, Napier
3:00	Try: Edmund Downing; Pen: Eric Grey		Try: Billy Stone 3, Danny Hurcombe 2, Arthur Skelhorne 2, Jim Bacon, Doug Clark, Jonty Parkin; Con: Ben Gronow	Attendance: 6,000; Referee: G Fraser

=== 1925 ===
1925 saw the first ever 'proper' North Island rugby league team match in what was to become a near annual fixture over the ensuing decades. The match was played in "unfavourable conditions" at Carlaw Park before 4,000 spectators, making "good football out of the question". The match was largely a battle of the forwards though North Island backs Lou Brown, Ben Davidson, and Horace Dixon all crossed for tries. Forward Ernie Herring had an outstanding game scoring a hat trick. Frank Delgrosso struggled with his goal kicking in the conditions, converting just one of their 7 tries. Neil Mouat scored all of the South Island's points with a try and 3 penalties. At halftime Neville St George came on for the North Island after Alf Townsend retired with a broken rib.

27 June	North Island	27–9	South Island	Carlaw Park 1
2:45	Try: Lou Brown, Ben Davidson, Ernie Herring 3, Horace Dixon, Bert Avery; Con: Frank Delgrosso		Try: Neil Mouat; Pen: Neil Mouat 3	Attendance: 4,000; Referee: Walter Ripley

=== 1926 ===
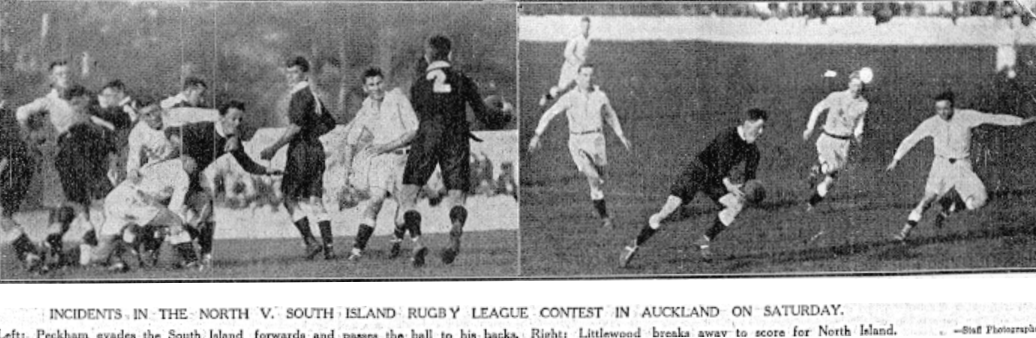
(left) Peckham passing out to Littlewood, and (right) Littlewood breaking away for his try

The entire North Island team was composed of Auckland players with the exception of Wally Desmond from Wellington. Unlike the previous season which saw just 4,000 attend the match the crowd for the 1926 edition was an enormous 18,000 with the match described as "brilliant". The South Island backs were said to be "Herculean", "fighting like tigers". The northern backs were far to clever though and they put on several tries with the margin likely to have been larger if not for Peckham and Cole leaving the field through injury in the second half leaving them 2 players short.

3 July	North Island	31–22	South Island	Carlaw Park 1
2:45	Try: Ivan Littlewood, Wally Desmond, Ben Davidson, Jack Kirwan, Hector Cole 2, Bert Avery; Con: Craddock Dufty 5		Try: G Brittenden, T Callentire, Jack Wright, Len Mason; Con: Frank Henry, Neil Mouat; Pen: Frank Henry, Neil Mouat 2	Attendance: 18,000; Referee: Les Bull

=== 1927 ===
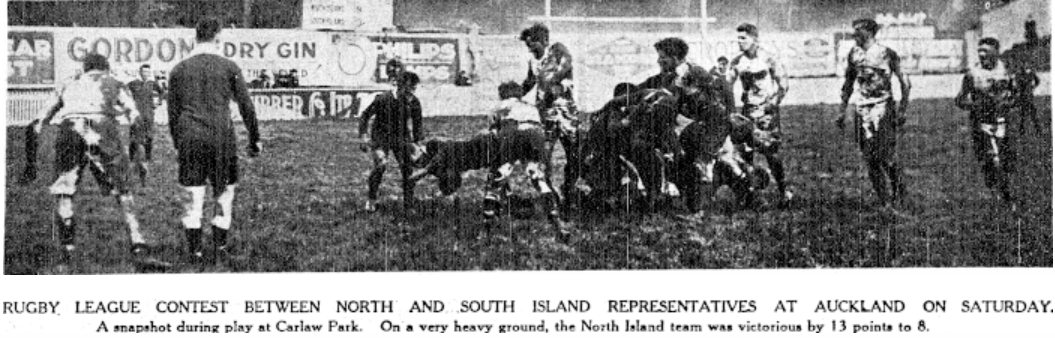

24 September	North Island	13–8	South Island	Carlaw Park 1
3:00	Try: Claude List, Stan Raynor 2 Con: Craddock Dufty 2		Try: Woods, Hand; Con: Sullivan	Attendance: 7,000; Referee: William Mincham

=== 1928 ===
28 July	North Island	44–8	South Island	Carlaw Park 1
3:00	Try: Roy Hardgrave 2, Hec Brisbane 3, Stan Raynor, Frank Delgrosso 2, Lou Hutt, Tom Timms; Con: Craddock Dufty, Frank Delgrosso 5 Pen: Craddock Dufty		Try: J Spillane, Goodall; Con: J Spillane	Attendance: 10,000; Referee: Les Bull

=== 1929 ===
Len Scott was injured during the match and replaced by Allan Seagar for the North Island while for the South Island Sanders was injured and replaced by Doogan. In past years the North Island team was dominated by players from the Auckland competition however the North Island team on this occasion featured players from outside Auckland such as Ted Meyer, Dick Trautvettor, Bob Stephenson, Joe Menzies, Tom Timms, and Tassie Bergan.

7 September	North Island	13–22	South Island	Carlaw Park 1
3:00	Try: Rod Hamilton, Ted Meyer, Frank Delgrosso; Con: Charles Gregory, Frank Delgrosso		Try: Alf Townsend, Johnny Dodds, Norm Griffiths, Mick O'Brien; Con: E Bond 2 Pen: E Bond 3	Attendance: 8,000; Referee: Percy Rogers

=== 1930 ===
For the North Island v South Island trial the Devonport and Ponsonby clubs gave permission for their jerseys to be worn by the respective sides. Mick O’Brien of the South Island team broke his tibia late in the match.

14 June	North Island	22-22	South Island	Carlaw Park 1
2:45	Try: Hec Brisbane 2, Alan Clarke, Tom Timms; Con: Craddock Dufty 4 Pen: Craddock Dufty		Try: Herbert Pearce, T McKenzie, Mick O'Brien, Jim Calder; Con: Herbert Pearce 2, Bert Eckhoff; Pen: Herbert Pearce, Bert Eckhoff	Referee: Les Bull

=== 1931 ===
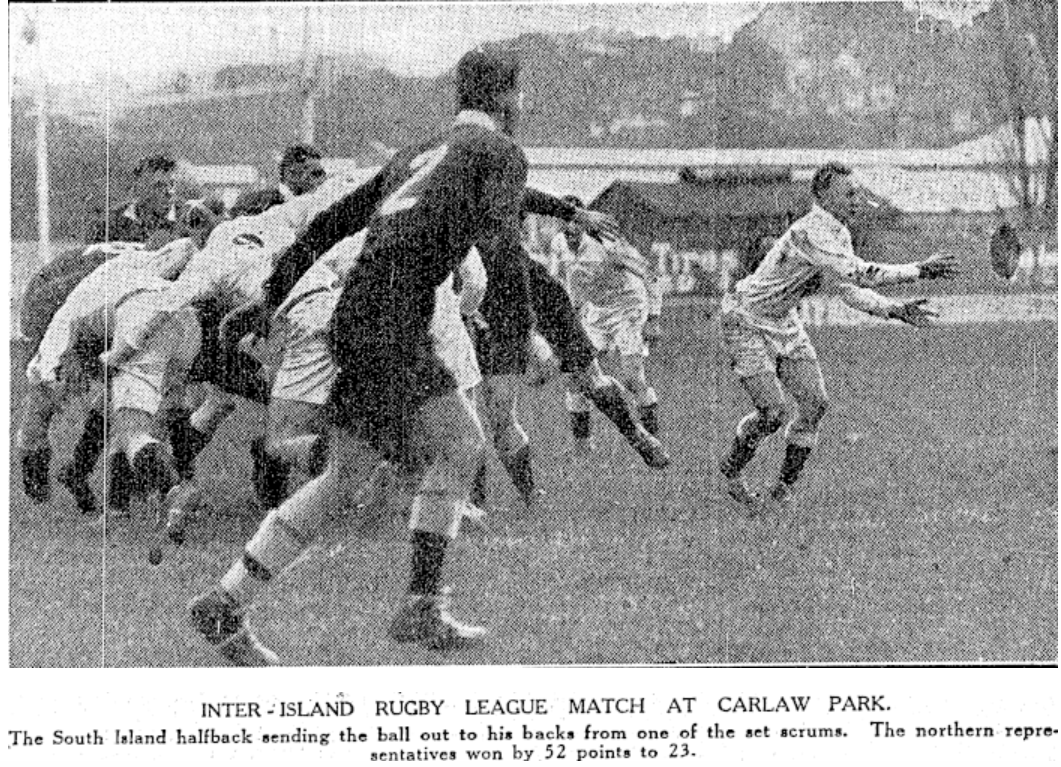

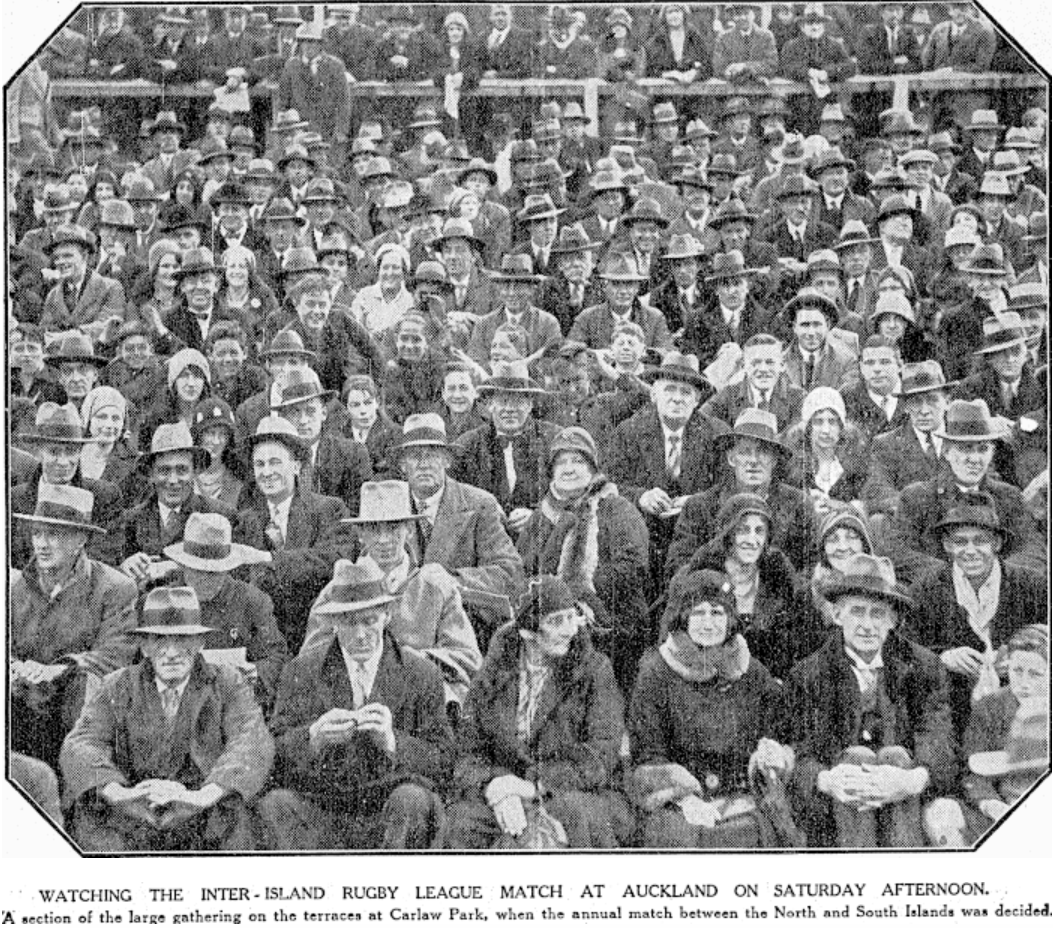

The North Island had one of their largest ever wins over the South Island. Pat Meehan of the Marist club scored 4 tries, with New Zealand internationals Claude List (3), Edwin Abbott (2), Hec Brisbane (2), and Alan Clarke also scoring. Clarke also kicked 5 conversions and a penalty for 15 individual points. For the South Island Falgar scored 2 tries, with Johnny Dodds scoring a try and kicking their lone conversion.

15 August	North Island	52–23	South Island	Carlaw Park 1
3:00	Try: Pat Meehan 4, Claude List 3, Edwin Abbott 2, Hec Brisbane 2, Alan Clarke; Con: Pat Meehan, Claude List, Alan Clarke 5 Pen: Alan Clarke		Try: C.E. Falgar 2, R.A. Jorgensen, Johnny Dodds, Jonas Masters; Con: Johnny Dodds	Referee: Les Bull

=== 1932 ===
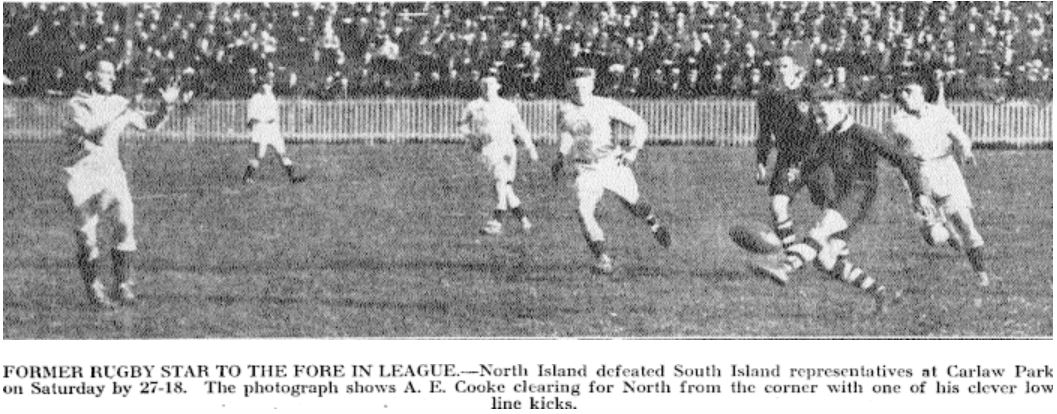
Bert Cooke (rugby) with a clearing kick for the North Island.

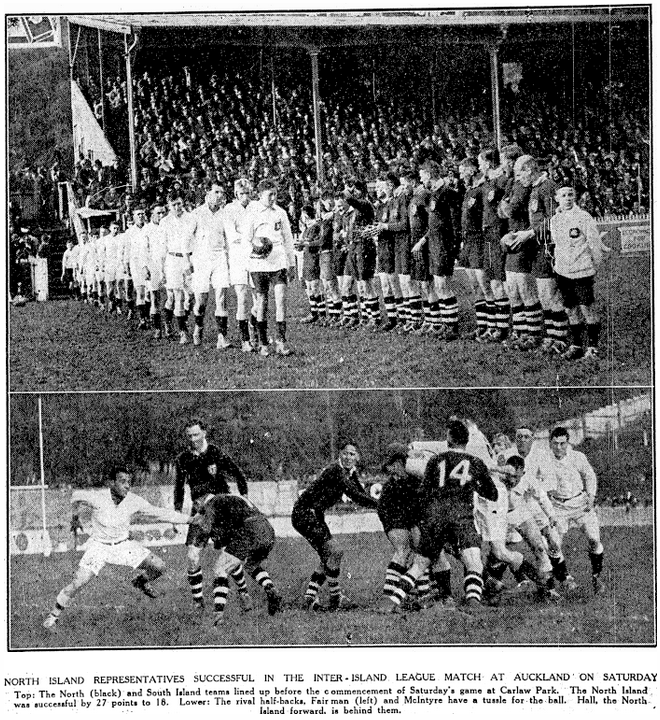

Jim Amos left the field with an injured shoulder for the South Island team and was replaced by E O'Brien. Bert Cooke made his North Island debut and played brilliantly, scoring three tries for the winners in front of a crowd of 15,000. He had only recently converted to rugby league but his performance was instrumental in his selection for the New Zealand test team. Len Scott also scored three tries with Claude List crossing for one. Albert Laing converted three of the North Island's seven tries. Laing also made his debut for New Zealand after his effort, while Scott and List also gained New Zealand selection once more after having debuted for New Zealand in 1928. For the South Island J. Devonport and E. Hamberger scored a try each. Jim Amos had kicked two goals before being replaced. Jonas Masters kicked their other three goals.

23 July	North Island	27–18	South Island	Carlaw Park 1
3:00	Try: Len Scott 3, Bert Cooke 3, Claude List; Con: Albert Laing 3		Try: J Devonport, E Hamberger; Con: Jonas Masters, Jim Amos; Pen: Jonas Masters 2, Jim Amos; Drop: E Hamberger	Attendance: 15,000; Referee: Percy Rogers

=== 1934 ===
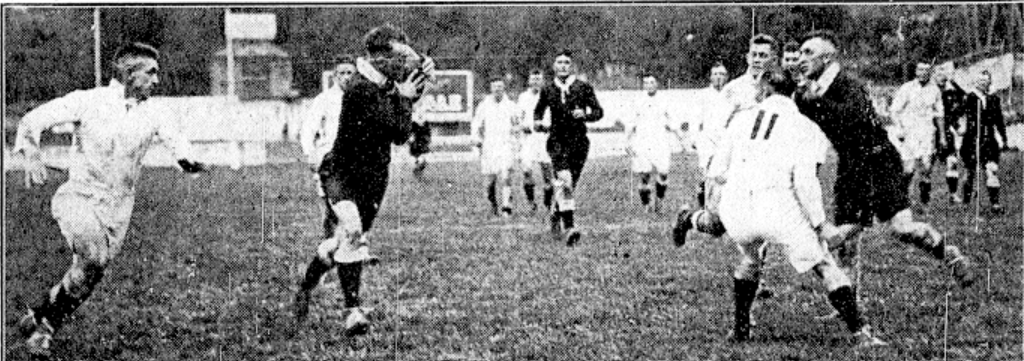
Stan Prentice taking a pass from Roy Powell for the North Island team.

The match was described as "by far the most brilliant North-South match seen in Auckland for many years". The South Island led 13-3 at the half time break before a magnificent rally by the North Island saw them overcome the deficit and draw level following tries to George Tittleton and Bert Cooke, both of which were converted by R.E. Smith from the Hawke's Bay. The North side extended their lead through tries to Cliff Satherley, Wally Tittleton, Cooke, and then Lou Hutt before the South Island scored a consolation try to Billy Glynn.

1 September	North Island	36–18	South Island	Carlaw Park
3:00	Try: George Tittleton, Wally Tittleton, R.E. Smith, Stan Prentice, Bert Cooke 2, Lou Hutt, Cliff Satherley; Con: George Tittleton 3, R.E. Smith 3		Try: M Morris, T O’Connor, Billy Glynn 2 Con: P Scott 2, E Hamberger	Attendance: 9,000; Referee: Percy Rogers

=== 1935 ===
This was the 10th inter-island match stretching back to 1925. The North Island had won 7, the South Island had won 1 in 1929, with a draw in 1930. Roy Bright, Wilf Hassan and McNeil (Richmond) were selected to play for the North Island but were unavailable. The North Island had 3 players debuting, Bill Telford, Ted Mincham, and W. Large (Hawke's Bay).

17 August	North Island	19-18	South Island	Carlaw Park 1
3:00	Try: Lou Brown, Bert Cooke 2, Roy Powell, Lou Hutt; Con: Cliff Satherley 2		Try: Bill McNeight, Billy Glynn, P Serra 2 Con: Jim Amos, L Young 2	Referee: Maurice Wetherill

=== 1936 ===
During the match Reg Haslam was running with the ball when he began falling into a hole which had fallen into the ground. In the meantime he had passed the ball and play moved away but was forced to stop once the referee realised what had happened. It had formed near a drain where the water had washed away the soil beneath the ground. A ball boy was photographed standing in the hole ‘buried’ to his waist. The gate receipts for the match were £608 19/ with 15,000 in attendance at the match and the trial curtain-raiser.

11 July	North Island	21-16	South Island	Carlaw Park 1
3:00	Try: Lou Brown 2, Roy Bright, Wally Tittleton, Harold Tetley; Con: John Anderson 2 Pen: John Anderson		Try: E Hendry, J McCarthy; Con: Ces Davison; Pen: Ces Davison 4	Attendance: 15,000; Referee: Percy Rogers

=== 1938 ===
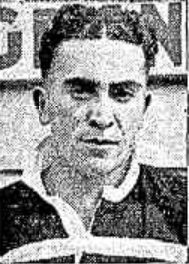
Rangi Chase who scored 2 tries for the North Island).

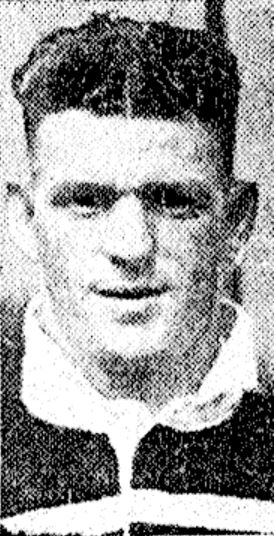
Angus Gault, try scorer for the North Island.

Brian Riley was initially named to play for the North Island side but as he was unable to get leave from work to potentially tour Australia if selected he was replaced in the North Island side. The result showed the absolute domination of the Auckland competition over other parts of New Zealand with 12 of the 13 players drawn from the Auckland club competition. Joe Cootes was the only player from outside Auckland, playing in Wellington. For the North Island Des Herring scored 3 tries, and Rangi Chase 2, with 7 other players (Gordon Midgley, Walter Brimble, Jack Satherley, Joe Cootes, Angus Gault, Jack Brodrick, and Clarry McNeil) also crossing the line. Jack Smith kicked 10 conversions and also kicked a penalty. The only scorer for the South Island was P. Scott who kicked a penalty.

21 May	North Island	55-2	South Island	Carlaw Park 1
1:30	Try: Gordon Midgley, Rangi Chase 2, Walter Brimble, Des Herring 3, Jack Satherley, Joe Cootes, Angus Gault, Jack Brodrick, Clarry McNeil; Con: Jack Smith 10; Pen: Jack Smith		Pen: P Scott	Referee: Frank Thompson

=== 1939 ===
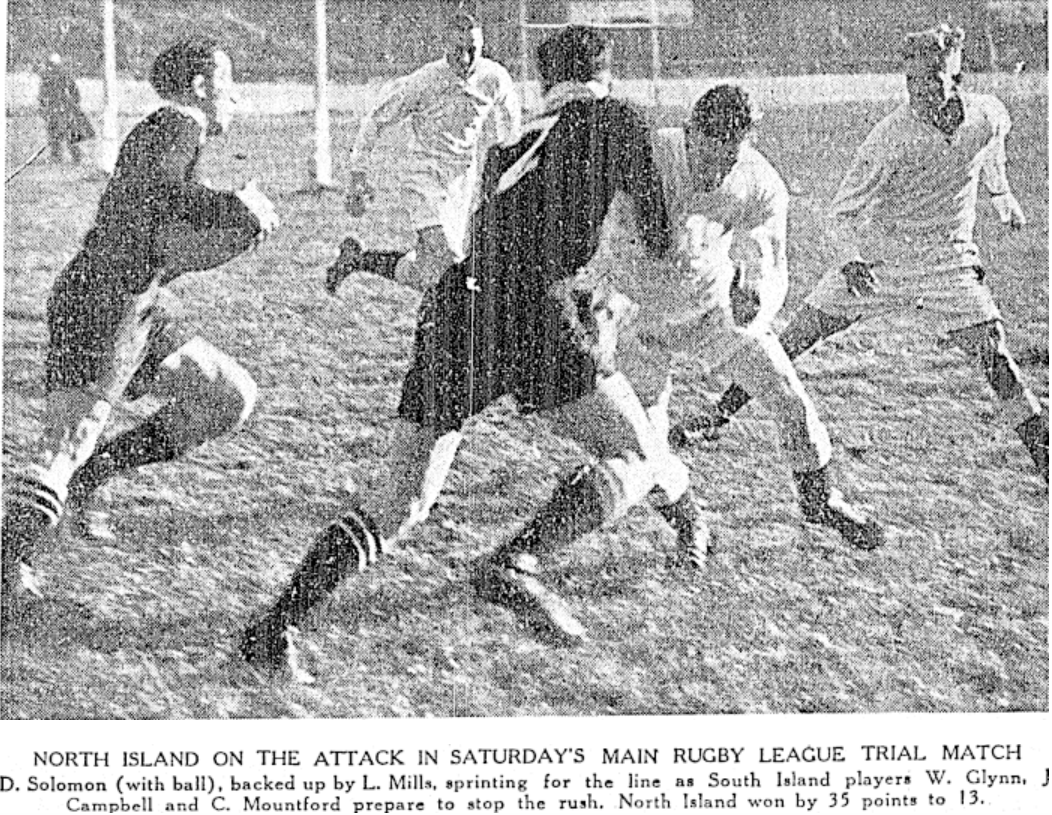
Dave Solomon with the ball and Laurie Mills in support for the North Island.

Wally Tittleton was chosen as the North Island captain while Rex King captained the South Island. For the North Island Roy Nurse scored two tries. He missed selection for New Zealand but was chosen for the 1946 side. Laurie Mills scored a try and was selected for the tour. He was killed in action on December 1, 1941 in Libya during World War 2. Other try scorers who were selected for the tour were Wally Tittleton, Dave Solomon who had recently transferred from rugby union, and Pita Ririnui.

8 July	North Island	35-13	South Island	Carlaw Park 1
3:00	Try: Roy Nurse 2, Wally Tittleton, Laurie Mills, Dave Solomon 2, Pita Ririnui; Con: Jack Hemi 3, Dave Solomon; Pen: Jack Hemi 3		Try: Ces Davison, John Clark, Rex King; Con: Ces Davison; Pen: Ces Davison	Referee: Ralph Otto

=== 1944 ===
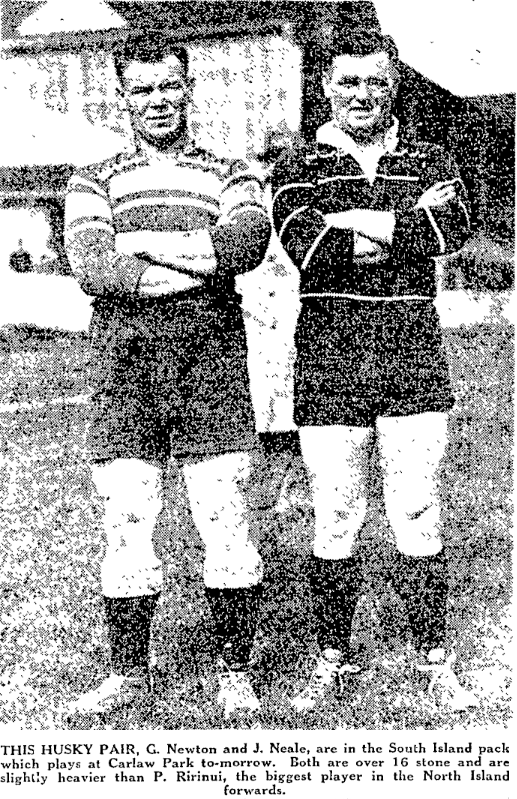

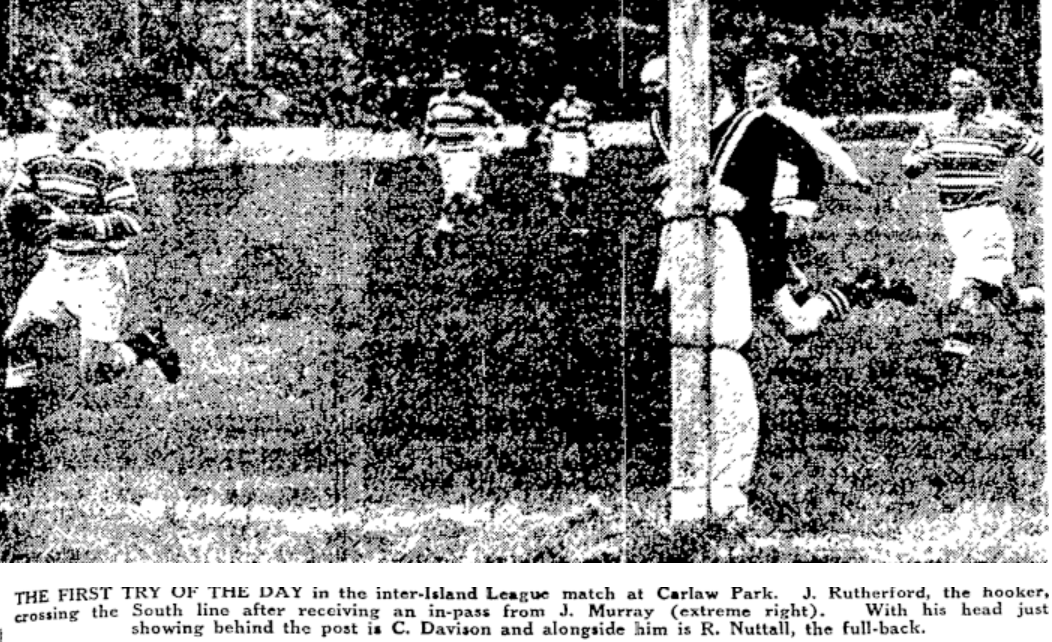

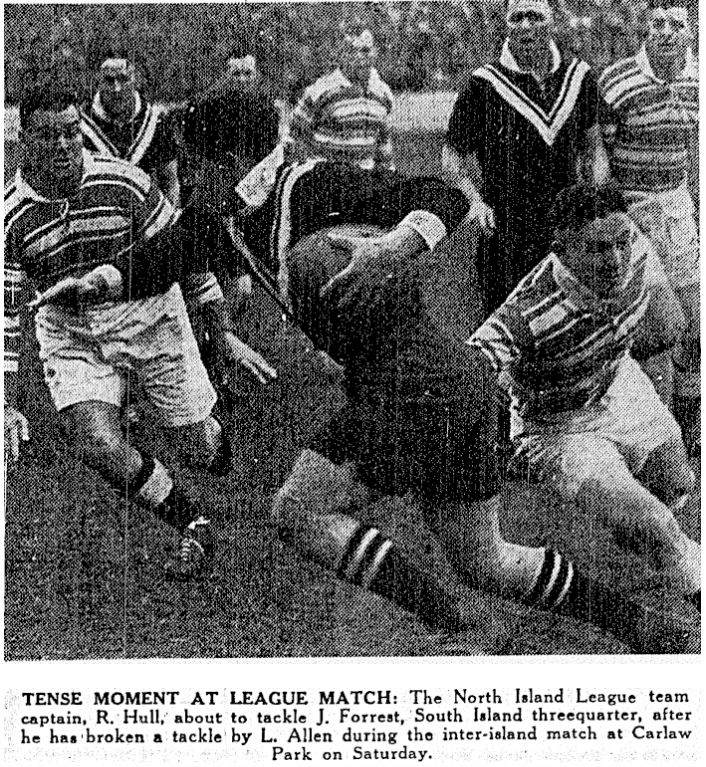

This was the first time since 1939 that the North Island v South Island match had been played. The North Island won comfortably scoring 9 tries to 3. Roy Nurse was the only North Island player who had previously played for them with the other 12 on debut. Ralph Martin had played for Manukau from 1940 to 1944 had moved to Wellington during the year for his army training and had joined the Korodale club and also represented Wellington following that point. Hawea Mataira had originally been selected but was travelling to Wellington with the Auckland Waterside Workers team to play in their annual fixture with Wellington Waterside and was replaced by Ririnui but then on match day he himself was replaced in the side by Wellington's F. Andrews who was in his first year of rugby league. Owen Brooks from the Waikato had a remarkable day scoring 3 tries and kicking 8 conversions for a personal tally of 25 tries. Joe Murray from the Manukau club also scored 3 tries. Pouvi (Robert) Salaia, one of the first Pacific born players involved in New Zealand rugby league, scored for the North Island. For the South Island New Zealand international John Newton scored twice and Ces Davison converted all three of their tries.

16 September	North Island	43-15	South Island	Carlaw Park 1
3:00	Try: Robert Salaia, Owen Brooks 3, Joe Murray 3, John Rutherford, Fred James; Con: Owen Brooks 8		Try: John Newton 2, P Smith; Con: Ces Davison 3	Referee: J O’Shannessey

=== 1945 ===
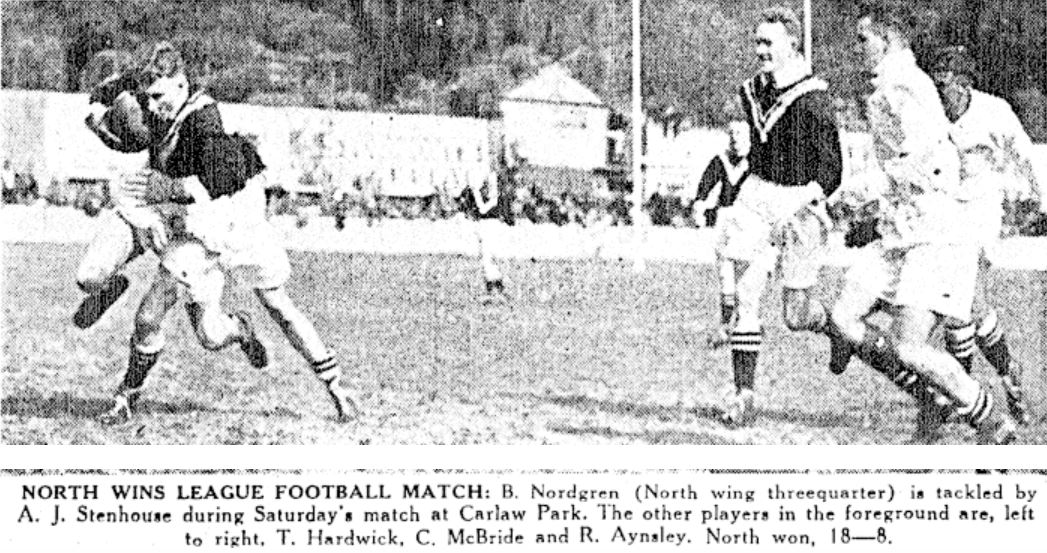

The South Island team featured 2 Wellington players (F Moses and Hector Mallinder) for the first time in its history, rendering it a South Island team in name only. G Moyes, chosen at lock from Waikato was unavailable as he was feeling unwell so his place was taken by Fred James of the City side and he played well scoring 2 tries. Veteran Arthur Kay played for the North Island in the centre position. He was in his 13th season of senior rugby league having debuted for Ponsonby in 1933. The crowd was estimated at between 15 and 20,000 which was the largest seen at the ground for many years.

6 October	North Island	18-8	South Island	Carlaw Park 1
3:00	Try: Brian Nordgren, Travers Hardwick, Fred James 2 Con: Jack Smith 2 Pen: Jack Smith		Try: Bill Mountford, Hector Mallinder; Con: Ces Mountford	Attendance: 15-20,000; Referee: K Knapper

=== 1947 ===
5 July	North Island	24-12	South Island	Carlaw Park 1
3:00	Try: Ron McGregor, Len Jordan 2, Maurie Robertson 3 Con: Unknown 3		Try: Jimmy Haig 2 Con: L Beri 2 Pen: L Beri	Attendance: 20-35,000

== Players, appearances and scoring (1920–1945) ==
Top point scorers
No	Player	Province(s)	Club(s)	Year(s)	Games	Try	Con	Pen	DG	Pts
1	Joe Bennett	Auckland	Grafton Athletic	1920	1	0	0	0	0	0
2	Pat Burrows	Hawkes Bay	Ahuriri	1920	1	0	0	0	0	0
3	Edmund Downing	Hawkes Bay	Ahuriri	1920	1	1	0	0	0	3
4	Percival Exeter	Hawkes Bay	City (HB)	1920	1	0	0	0	0	0
5	Eric Grey	Auckland	Maritime	1920	1	0	0	1	0	2
6	Ernie Herring	Auckland	Athletic (Maritime)	1920, 1925, 1926	3	3	0	0	0	9
7	Norm Loveridge	Auckland	Marist	1920	1	0	0	0	0	0
8	Con McCarthy	Hawke's Bay	Ahuriri	1920	1	0	0	0	0	0
9	Henry Pring	Hawkes Bay	City (HB)	1920	1	0	0	0	0	0
10	Mike Pollock	Wellington	Newtown	1920	1	0	0	0	0	0
11	Joe Scott	Wellington	Suburbs	1920	1	0	0	0	0	0
12	G Smith	Wellington	Suburbs	1920	1	0	0	0	0	0
13	Charles Woolley	Auckland	Grafton Athletic	1920	1	0	0	0	0	0
14	Bert Avery	Auckland	Athletic (Maritime)	1925, 1926	2	2	0	0	0	6
15	Nelson Bass	Auckland	City	1925	1	0	0	0	0	0
16	Lou Brown	Auckland	City	1925, 1935, 1936	3	4	0	0	0	12
17	Alphonsus Carroll	Wellington	Newtown	1925	1	0	0	0	0	0
18	Ben Davidson	Auckland	City	1925, 1926	2	2	0	0	0	6
19	Frank Delgrosso	Auckland	Ponsonby	1925, 1928, 1929	3	3	7	0	0	23
20	Horace Dixon	Auckland	Devonport (N. Shore)	1925	1	1	0	0	0	3
21	Craddock Dufty	Auckland	Athletic (Maritime), Newton, Ellerslie	1925, 1926, 1927, 1928, 1930	5	0	12	2	0	28
22	Wilson Hall	Auckland	Athletic (Maritime)	1925	1	0	0	0	0	0
23	Jack Kirwan	Auckland	Marist	1925, 1926	2	1	0	0	0	3
24	Alf Townsend	Auckland	City	1925, 1926	2	0	0	0	0	0
25	Maurice Wetherill	Auckland	City	1925, 1927, 1928, 1930	4	0	0	0	0	0
26	Neville St George	Auckland	Devonport	1925	1	0	0	0	0	0
27	Alan Clarke	Auckland	Newton, Marist, Marist-Devonport	1926, 1927, 1930, 1931	4	2	5	1	0	18
28	Hector Cole	Auckland	Ponsonby	1926	1	2	0	0	0	6
29	Wally Desmond	Wellington	none (*)	1926	1	1	0	0	0	3
30	Lou Hutt	Auckland	Ponsonby	1926, 1928, 1931, 1932, 1934, 1935	6	3	0	0	0	9
31	Ivan Littlewood	Auckland	Ponsonby	1926	1	1	0	0	0	3
32	Tim Peckham	Auckland	Ponsonby	1926, 1927	2	0	0	0	0	0
33	Arthur Singe	Auckland	Marist	1926	1	0	0	0	0	0
34	Frederick Chell	Wellington	North	1927	1	0	0	0	0	0
35	Charles Gregory	Auckland	Marist	1927, 1929	2	0	1	0	0	2
36	Claude List	Auckland	Kingsland, Marist, Marist-Devonport	1927, 1931, 1932	3	5	1	0	0	17
37	George Love	Wellington	Hutt	1927	1	0	0	0	0	0
38	Jim O'Brien (Dev.)	Auckland	Devonport (N. Shore)	1927	1	0	0	0	0	0
39	Stan Prentice	Auckland	Richmond	1927, 1928, 1932, 1934, 1935	5	1	0	0	0	3
40	Stan Raynor	S. Auckland (Waikato)	Huntly	1927, 1928	2	3	0	0	0	9
41	Wally Somers	Auckland	Newton	1927, 1928	2	0	0	0	0	0
42	Tom Timms	S. Auckland (Waikato)	Huntly	1927, 1928, 1929, 1930, 1931, 1932, 1934, 1935	8	2	0	0	0	6
43	Hec Brisbane	Auckland	Marist, Marist-Devonport	1928, 1929, 1930, 1931, 1932	5	7	0	0	0	21
44	Roy Hardgrave	Auckland	Newton	1928	1	2	0	0	0	6
45	Jim O'Brien (Mar.)	Auckland	Marist	1928	1	0	0	0	0	0
46	Alf Scott	Auckland	Devonport	1928	1	0	0	0	0	0
47	Dick Trautvettor	S. Auckland (Waikato)	Huntly	1928, 1929, 1930	3	0	0	0	0	0
48	Rod Hamilton	Northland	Hikurangi	1929	1	1	0	0	0	3
49	Len Scott	Auckland	Devonport	1929, 1932	2	3	0	0	0	9
50	Ted Meyer	Northland)	Waro	1929, 1930	2	1	0	0	0	3
51	Willie Shortland	Auckland	Huntly	1929, 1930	2	0	0	0	0	0
52	Bob Stephenson	S. Auckland (Waikato)	Huntly	1929, 1930, 1931, 1932	4	0	0	0	0	0
53	Joe Menzies	S. Auckland (Waikato)	Ngaruawahia	1929, 1930	2	0	0	0	0	0
54	Tassie Berghan	Northland	Waro	1929	1	0	0	0	0	0
55	Stanley Francis	Auckland	Newton	1929	1	0	0	0	0	0
56	Allan Seagar	Auckland	Devonport	1929	1	0	0	0	0	0
57	Stan Clark	Auckland	City	1930, 1934	2	0	0	0	0	0
58	George Perry	Auckland	City	1930	1	0	0	0	0	0
59	George Tittleton	S. Auckland (Waikato)	Ngaruawahia, Taupiri	1930, 1934	2	1	3	0	0	9
60	Edwin Abbott	S. Auckland (Waikato)	Ngaruawahia	1931	1	2	0	0	0	6
61	Gordon Campbell	Auckland	Marist-Devonport	1931	1	0	0	0	0	0
62	Norm Campbell	Auckland	Marist-Devonport, Marist	1931, 1935	2	0	0	0	0	0
63	Charles Dunn	Auckland	Richmond	1931	1	0	0	0	0	0
64	Wilf Hassan	Auckland	Marist-Devonport	1931	1	0	0	0	0	0
65	Pat Meehan	Auckland	Marist-Devonport	1931	1	4	1	0	0	14
66	Hugh Simpson	Auckland	Marist-Devonport	1931	1	0	0	0	0	0
67	Bert Cooke	Auckland	Richmond	1932, 1934, 1935	3	7	0	0	0	21
68	Trevor Hall	Auckland	Newton	1932	1	0	0	0	0	0
69	Albert Laing	Auckland	Devonport	1932	1	0	3	0	0	6
70	Jim Laird	S. Auckland (Waikato), Auckland	Ngaruawahia, Marist	1932, 1935	2	0	0	0	0	0
71	A.S. McIntyre	Auckland	Ponsonby	1932	1	0	0	0	0	0
72	Charlie White	Northland	Whaka-Waro	1932	1	0	0	0	0	0
73	Cliff Hunt	Taranaki	Inglewood	1934	1	0	0	0	0	0
74	Jack McLeod	Taranaki	Western Suburbs	1934	1	0	0	0	0	0
75	Charlie O'Callaghan	Northland	Hikurangi	1934	1	0	0	0	0	0
76	Roy Powell	Auckland	Richmond	1934, 1935	2	1	0	0	0	3
77	Cliff Satherley	Auckland	Richmond	1934, 1935	2	1	2	0	0	7
78	R.E. Smith	Hawke's Bay	Taradale	1934	1	1	3	0	0	9
79	Wally Tittleton	S. Auckland (Waikato)	Taupiri	1934, 1935, 1936, 1938, 1939	5	3	0	0	0	9
80	H Large	Hawke's Bay	Taradale	1935	1	0	0	0	0	0
81	Ted Mincham	Auckland	Richmond	1935	1	0	0	0	0	0
82	Bill Telford	Auckland	Richmond	1935	1	0	0	0	0	0
83	John Anderson	Auckland	Marist	1936	1	0	0	0	0	0
84	Roy Bright	Auckland	Newton	1936	1	0	0	0	0	0
85	J Coman	Wellington	Petone	1936	1	0	0	0	0	0
86	Joe Cootes	Wellington	St George	1936, 1938	2	1	0	0	0	3
87	Claude Dempsey	Auckland	Newton	1936	1	0	0	0	0	0
88	Edgar Morgan	Auckland	Ponsonby	1936	1	0	0	0	0	0
89	Reg Haslam	Auckland	Marist	1936	1	0	0	0	0	0
90	Frank Pickrang	Auckland	Manukau	1936	1	0	0	0	0	0
91	Jack Satherley	Auckland	Richmond	1936	1	0	0	0	0	0
92	Ngana Teiria Staples	Hawke's Bay	Marama	1936	1	0	0	0	0	0
93	Harold Tetley	Auckland	Richmond	1936, 1938	2	1	0	0	0	3
94	Walter Brimble	Auckland	Manukau	1938	1	1	0	0	0	3
95	Wilfred Brimble	Auckland	Newton	1938	1	0	0	0	0	0
96	Jack Brodrick	Auckland	Manukau	1938	1	1	0	0	0	3
97	Rangi Chase	Auckland	Manukau	1938	1	2	0	0	0	6
98	Angus Gault	Auckland	Manukau	1938	1	1	0	0	0	3
99	Des Herring	Auckland	Mount Albert	1938	1	3	0	0	0	9
100	Gordon Midgley	Auckland	Marist	1938	1	1	0	0	0	3
101	Clarry McNeil	Auckland	Mount Albert	1938	1	1	0	0	0	3
102	Jack Satherley	Auckland	Richmond	1938	1	1	0	0	0	3
103	Jack Smith	Auckland	North Shore	1938, 1945	2	0	12	2	0	28
104	George Beadle	S. Auckland (Waikato)	United	1939	1	0	0	0	0	0
105	J Brooks	S. Auckland (Waikato)	United	1939	1	0	0	0	0	0
106	Jack Hemi	Auckland	Manukau	1939	1	0	3	3	0	12
107	Arthur Kay	Auckland	Ponsonby	1939, 1945	2	0	0	0	0	0
108	Hawea Mataira	Auckland	City	1939	1	0	0	0	0	0
109	Harold Miliken	Auckland	Papakura	1939	1	0	0	0	0	0
110	Laurie Mills	Auckland	Richmond	1939	1	1	0	0	0	3
111	Roy Nurse	Auckland	Ponsonby	1939, 1944	2	2	0	0	0	6
112	Pita Ririnui	Auckland	Manukau	1939, 1945, 1946	3	1	0	0	0	3
113	Dave Solomon	Wellington	Miramar	1939	1	2	1	0	0	8
114	P Stanaway	Auckland	Ponsonby	1939	1	0	0	0	0	0
115	W Walker	Auckland	Mount Albert	1939	1	0	0	0	0	0
116	L Allan	S. Auckland (Waikato)	Huntly South	1944, 1945	2	0	0	0	0	0
117	F Andrews	Wellington	Aotea South	1944	1	0	0	0	0	0
118	Owen Brooks	S. Auckland (Waikato)	Huntly South	1944	1	3	8	0	0	25
119	Dick Hull	Auckland	Ponsonby	1944	1	0	0	0	0	0
120	Fred James	Auckland	City	1944, 1945	2	3	0	0	0	9
121	Ralph Martin	Wellington	Korodale	1944	1	0	0	0	0	0
122	Ron McGregor	Auckland	Richmond	1944	1	0	0	0	0	0
123	G Moyes	S. Auckland (Waikato)	United	1944	1	0	0	0	0	0
124	Joe Murray	Auckland	Manukau	1944, 1945	2	3	0	0	0	9
125	Pouvi (Robert) Salaia	Auckland	City	1944	1	1	0	0	0	3
126	W Rogers	Auckland	Manukau	1944	1	0	0	0	0	0
127	John Rutherford	Auckland	North Shore	1944, 1945	2	1	0	0	0	3
128	Roy Clark	Auckland	North Shore	1945	1	0	0	0	0	0
129	Albert Hambleton	S. Auckland (Waikato)	Huntly	1945	1	0	0	0	0	0
130	Travers Hardwick	Auckland	Ponsonby	1945	1	1	0	0	0	3
131	Pat Kelly	Auckland	Ponsonby	1945	1	0	0	0	0	0
132	Brian Nordgren	Auckland	Ponsonby	1945	1	1	0	0	0	3
133	Des Ryan	Auckland	Richmond	1945	1	0	0	0	0	0

Notes

- Wally Desmond moved to Wellington in 1926 and played for the representative side against Waikato (South Auckland); however there was then no club competition in Wellington.
- In 1925 Neville St George came on as a replacement for Alf Townsend at halftime.
- In 1929 Allan Seagar replaced Len Scott at halftime.
- In 1931 the Marist and Devonport clubs fielded a combined team as a short-lived requirement by the Auckland Rugby League.
- In 1944 Ralph Martin was representing Wellington. He had played several seasons for Manukau in Auckland but had moved to Wellington as part of his Army training and was a member of the Korodale club.

== Record by Opponent from 1920 to 1945 ==
Opponent	Played	W	D	L	PF	PA	PD
England (1920)	1	0	0	1	5	46	-41
South Island (1925-1945)	15	13	1	1	456	222	+234
Total	16	13	1	2	461	268	+193

== Representation by province (1920-1945) ==
Jim Laird is the only player to represent the North Island for more than one province (Waikato in 1932, and Auckland in 1935).

Province	Players
Auckland	93
Waikato	15
Wellington	11
Hawke's Bay	8
Northland	5
Taranaki	2
Total	134

== Representation by club (1920-1945) ==
Club Teams	North Island Representatives
Ponsonby (Auckland)	14
Richmond (Auckland)	13
Marist (Auckland)	13
North Shore (Auckland)	11
City (Auckland)	10
Manukau (Auckland)	9
Newton (Auckland)	9
Huntly (Waikato)	5
Marist-Devonport (1931 combined team) (Auckland)	5
Maritime (Auckland)	5
Ngaruawahia (Waikato)	4
Ahuriri (Hawke's Bay)	3
Mount Albert (Auckland)	3
United (Waikato)	3
City (Hawke's Bay)	2
Grafton Athletic (Auckland)	2
Hikurangi (Northland)	2
Huntly South (Waikato)	2
Newtown (Wellington)	2
Suburbs (Wellington)	2
Taradale (Hawke's Bay)	2
Taupiri (Waikato)	2
Waro (Northland)	2
Aotea (Wellington)	1
Ellerslie (Auckland)	1
Hutt (Wellington)	1
Inglewood (Taranaki)	1
Kingsland Rovers (Auckland)	1
Korodale (Wellington)	1
Marama (Hawke's Bay)	1
North (Wellington)	1
Papakura (Auckland)	1
Petone (Wellington)	1
St. George (Wellington)	1
Western Suburbs (Wellington)	1
Whaka-Waro (Northland)	1
Total	139
