= Jim Laird (rugby league) =

New Zealand international rugby league player

Personal information
- Full name: James Laird
- Born: 1904; New Zealand
- Died: Deceased; New Zealand

Playing information
- Weight: 13 st 5 lb (85 kg)
- Position: Second-row, Prop, Hooker
Club
Years	Team	Pld	T	G	FG	P
1930–32	Ngaruawahia	10	4	1	0	14
1932–35	Marist Old Boys	53	11	0	0	33
	Total	63	15	1	0	47
Representative
Years	Team	Pld	T	G	FG	P
1931	Waikato Trial	2	0	0	0	0
1931	Lower Waikato	1	0	0	0	0
1932	South Auckland	3	0	0	0	0
1932–35	North Island	2	0	0	0	0
1932–35	New Zealand	4	0	0	0	0
1933–35	Auckland	9	2	0	0	6

Jim Laird was a rugby league player who represented New Zealand in 4 test matches (1 v England in 1932 and 3 v Australia in 1935) in the second row and at hooker. He became the 226th player to represent New Zealand. He also played club rugby league for Ngaruawahia (1930–32), and Marist Old Boys (1932-35). He also played for Waikato representative teams (1930–32), and Auckland (1933-35).

== Playing career ==
=== Ngaruawahia ===
In 1930 Jim Laird was selected to play for Ngaruawahia's senior A team against Hamilton on June 21. Ngaruawahia won 22-5 and it was said that Laird, along with Joe Menzies, and Dare were “the outstanding home forwards”. On September 27 he played for Ngaruawahi in a Draffin Cup match against Huntly. Ngaruawahia won the match 12–10. Then on October 4 he played for Ngaruawahia against the same opponents for the Draffin Cup once more. Ngaruawahia won 3–0 with Laird said to be “the most outstanding player on the field”.

The 1931 season saw Laird playing once again for Ngaruawahia. On May 20 he played in a match against Huntly which his side won 11–8. He was then selected for a Waikato trial side between a Probables team and a Possibles side on July 25. He was listed as a reserve for both sides. On August 15 he played in the senior final for Ngaruawahia against Taupiri. Laird scored a try after a “fine” passing movement from his side, and kicked a penalty goal from halfway. Ngaruawahia won the match and the 1931 title by 8 points to 5. Two weeks later Laird played for a Lower Waikato side against Marist Old Boys from Auckland, a side he was to join the following season. Laird was listed to play in the lock position. He had been used in several positions in the forwards including prop and the second row. Marist won the match 13–11. A week later Laird played for Ngaruawahia in a Draffin Cup match with Huntly. He played in the front row of a 14–7 defeat at the hands of Huntly. Laird's final match of the season was in a trial at Taupiri to pick the South Auckland team to play the touring Eastern Suburbs team which was touring from New South Wales. Laird played in the front row for his ‘B Team’ but was ultimately not selected to play for South Auckland.

=== South Auckland and North Island selection ===
Laird began 1932 once again in the black jersey of Ngaruawahia. His first match was for them against Hamilton on April 30. It was played at Hinemoa Park in Hamilton and saw Ngaruawahia run out 14-0 winners. Laird along with Joe Menzies and Huia Mason were reported as being “the best of a hard-working set” of forwards. On May 28 he played for Ngaruawahia against Taupiri and scored 2 tries in a 21 to 8 win. Two weeks later on June 11 he was part of the Ngaruawahia side which defeated Hamilton by 9 points to 5 and his form was good enough to gain selection for the South Auckland side. He was selected in the front row to play along with Menzies, Stephenson, Scott, Timms, and Jackways. They played against Northland on June 18. The match was for the Northern Union Challenge Cup by 15 points to 13 at Hikurangi before a crowd of 1,000. The North Island selector Thomas McClymont was present at the match to assist with choosing the team to play against the South Island. He then played for South Auckland against an Auckland XIII on July 16. Laird played well but the South Auckland team lost 29 to 13 at Carlaw Park.

Laird obviously impressed McClymont as he was selected for the North Island side in a forward pack which included Bob Stephenson, Lou Hutt, Charlie White, Tom Timms, and Trevor Hall. The match was played at Carlaw Park before a large crowd of 15,000 and saw the North Island side win 27 points to 18. It was commented after the game that “Laird was always in the picture” though overall the “North forwards were rather disappointing as a set…” The Waikato Times wrote that Laird had “justified” his inclusion with his performance.

Laird missed selection for the New Zealand team to play the touring England side in the first test. He was however pulled into the training squad for the second test after New Zealand had lost the first test 24 to 9. He had also been selected to play for South Auckland against the English side on August 4. It was said in the Waikato Times that he was “a splendid type of forward who earned praise for his game at Carlaw Park last Saturday, when his play, to many, warranted even New Zealand selection”. The match was played at Taupiri and the local side was thrashed by a strong English team by 64 points to 11 before a crowd of 2,000.

=== New Zealand selection and move to Marist Old Boys (Auckland) ===
Following Laird's appearance for South Auckland against England he moved to Auckland and joined the Marist Old Boys club who played in the Auckland Rugby League competition. He debuted for them immediately playing against Newton Rangers on August 13 at the Ellerslie Reserve. He scored their first try in a 10–6 win. Laird was then selected for the New Zealand team to play England in the third test at Carlaw Park on August 20. New Zealand had been defeated in the second test in Christchurch 25 to 14 which secured the series for them. Six changes had been made to the side for the third test. Laird was partnered in the second row with Ray Lawless, with Alan Clarke at lock. Laird had replaced Lou Hutt who had suffered a compound fracture of the thumb in a match for a New Zealand XIII against England between the second and third tests in Wellington. New Zealand pushed England hard in the third test at Carlaw Park before a crowd of 12,000 and only lost 20–18 with England scoring a late try to take the win. In the first half with the scores tied at 5-5 Laird and Lawless were involved in carrying play from deep in New Zealand's end when they were on defence up to halfway with New Zealand scoring a short time later. The Huntly Press and District Gazette made a brief comment that “the two Ngaruawahia players, Laird and Abbot were very prominent in the play”.

Following the third test he played for Marist in their Roope Rooster semi-final win over Devonport United. It was said that Laird along with teammates, Flanagan and Iveson, were “always dashy in the forwards”, and that he and Iveson “were the best Marist forwards”. He then played in the final against City Rovers which Marist won 28 points to 8. A week later Laird was in action again for Marist in the Stormont Shield final against Devonport United. Marist won the match 15 points to 8. The New Zealand Herald reported that “Laird was perhaps the best of the forwards” in the match. On October 8 Laird played for Marist in a Max Jaffe Cup charity match. The trophy was supposed to be awarded to the team which came runner up in the championship but as Marist had finished tied for second with Ponsonby United it was decided to have a playoff for the trophy. Marist won 37 to 8 but Laird was hospitalised with a leg injury. He was taken to Auckland Hospital “to undergo an X-ray examination at the conclusion” of the match. It “was believed that Laird had injured a bone in one leg”.

=== Marist and Auckland ===
1933 saw Laird playing for his new Marist Old Boys side from the beginning of the season. He played 20 matches in total for them and scored 3 tries. Following a round 6 match between Marist and City Rovers where he scored a try it was reported that he was the best forward on the ground. He was selected following the match for Auckland's opening representative match of the season against Taranaki. Before a crowd of 10,000 at Carlaw Park Laird scored a first half try as Auckland jumped out to a 21 to 5 lead at the break before holding off Taranaki to win 32 to 20. The Auckland Star reported that “Laird and Lawless were the outstanding forwards, and were ably supported by [Cliff] Satherley and [Bert] Leatherbarrow".

Laird played four more matches for Marist before being selected to play in the second row for the Auckland clash with South Auckland on July 15. The match was for the Northern Union Challenge Cup and saw South Auckland hold on to the trophy with a 14–0 win at Carlaw Park. The match was played in horrible conditions underfoot with “most of the stoppages… due to mud in the eyes of the contestants”. It was reported that “the Auckland team played rather lifelessly, the outstanding forwards being Laird and Satherley. Laird was chosen as a reserve for Auckland’s matches against North Auckland on August 12, Hawke's Bay on September 2, and South Auckland on September 9 but was not required to take the field in any of these matches.

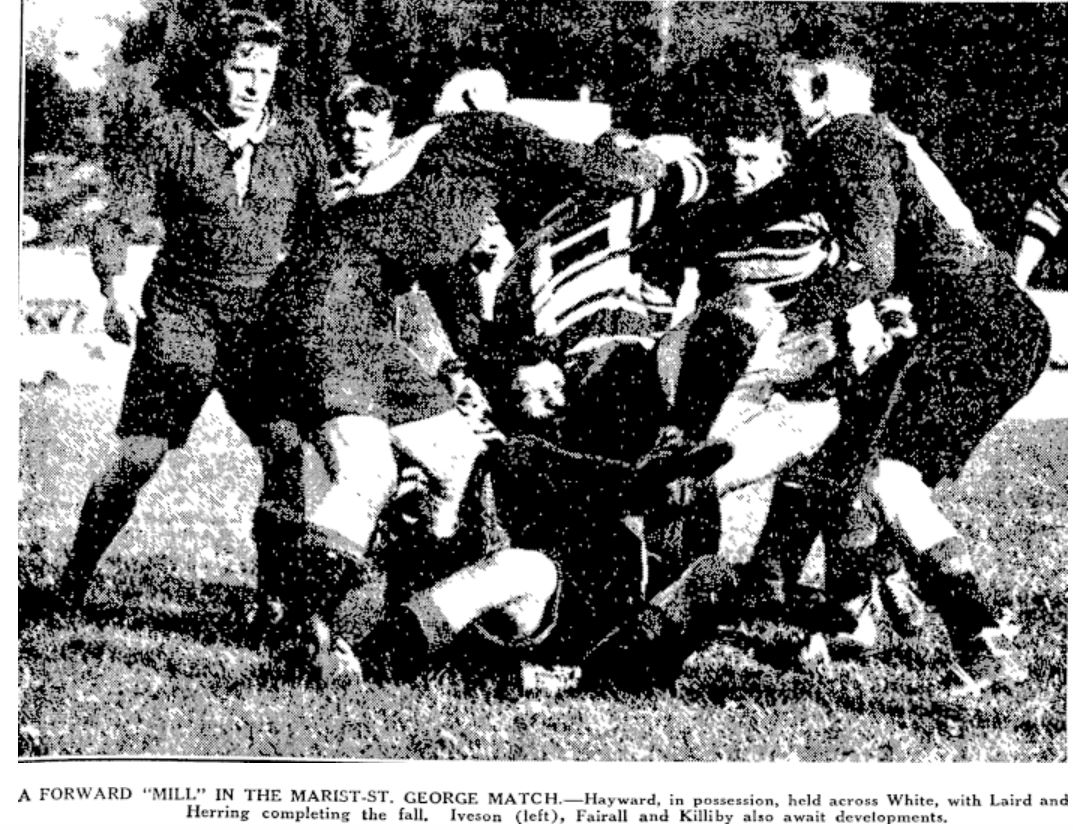
Laird making the tackle (upright on the left) with Herring tackling on the right and White on the ground in the Marist game against St George.

On September 30 Laird played for Marist against St. George who had finished runner up in the 1933 NSWRFL competition and were touring the upper North Island. Before 13,000 spectators Marist won by 25 points to 11. The Marist forwards played well with “White, Laird and Iveson … perhaps the best…”.

In 1934 Laird played 16 matches for Marist and scored 3 more tries. After round 8 of the Fox Memorial championship Laird was left out of the first Auckland representative match of the season. The New Zealand Herald reported that “the omission of J. Laird, Marist, and T. Hall, Newton, is hard to understand. Laird is one of the best forwards playing the code. He is always near the ball and is equally at home on attack or defence…”. He was chosen for Auckland to play against Northland on August 11. Auckland won by 19 points to 12. Laird was instrumental in starting a passing bout among the forwards down the terrace side of the field which “enabled Hall to score from a ruck in the corner” which gave Auckland a 11–10 lead. On September 15 he played for Auckland against South Auckland and scored a try in a 35–16 win. He had initially been chosen as a reserve with Satherley and Lawless in the second row but he played in the match after the forward pack was reshuffled with Satherley moving to the reserves. Laird along with Lawless and Hall “were perhaps the best forwards”. Laird's try came after “clever play by Cooke [saw] Laird following him through to score by the posts”. He would have scored another but “Lawless lost a try for Auckland through a poor pass to Laird”.

Laird finished the season playing in 2 matches for Marist. The first was against the touring Western Suburbs. They had recently won the 1934 NSW RFL competition. Marist lost a tightly contested match by 21 points to 19 on September 21 at Carlaw Park. Marist had fallen behind 13-3 before a converted try to Hec Brisbane narrowed the scores and then “Laird gathered a bouncing ball and, running fast for ten yards towards the corner, handed on to Smith, who materialised amid cheers”. Marist later took the lead however Western Suburbs scored and converted on the fulltime to win. Laird then played in a benefit match for Hec Brisbane who was retiring after a career involving 11 seasons with Marist which also featured 50 appearances for New Zealand, 5 for the North Island, and 15 for Auckland sides. Marist won by 30 points to 21 against Newton Rangers with Laird “prominent among the forwards.

=== New Zealand selection v Australia ===
The 1935 season for Laird was incredibly memorable for triumphant and tragic reasons. He was to resume his New Zealand career when he played in all three test matches against the touring Australian side. However it was to be the final year of his career when a serious knee infection following the third test saw him spend months in hospital and it ended his rugby league career.

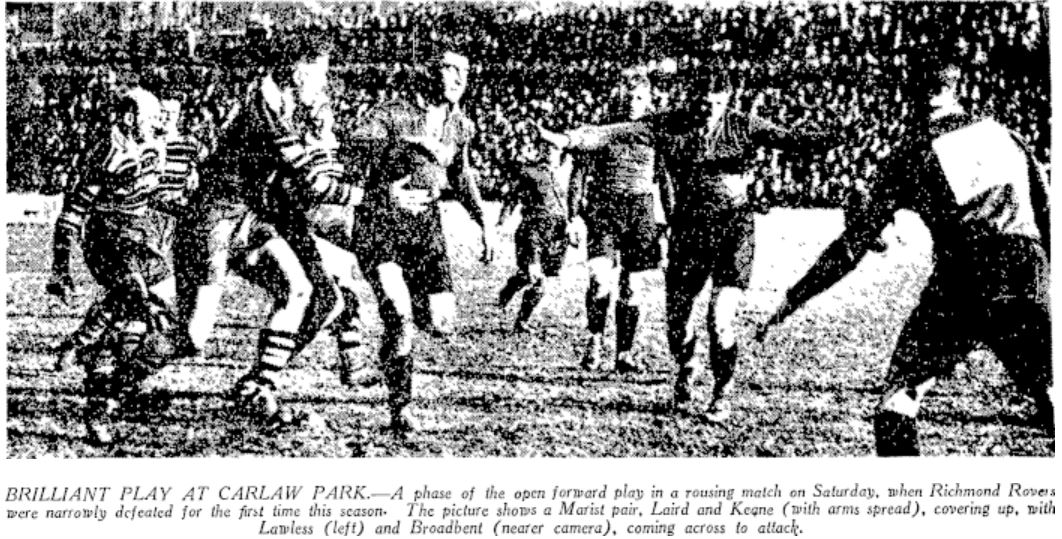
Laird coming across to make a tackle on the left (to the right of the ball carrier).

He played 15 times for Marist and scored 4 tries during the season. He was in good form to start the season, scoring a try in a 17-17 round 1 draw with Devonport United. The New Zealand Herald reported that “Laird, Woods and Keane played splendid games in the forwards”. He was “outstanding” in Marists 10–8 win over competition leaders Richmond Rovers in their round 5 match, and “has never played better”. The following weekend in their match with Newton Rangers Laird was forced from the field early in the second half with a bad eye injury which required several stitches to close the wound. He had been “conspicuous for all-round work up to the time of his retirement”. It was thought that he would be out for a week but he ultimately was available to play a week later. The match was against Devonport United and saw Laird play in the unusual position of ‘rover’ amongst the backs with Marist deciding to only play 5 players in the forwards packing a scrum with 2 in the front row and 3 in the second row. It was a controversial formation which provoked discussion by the Auckland Rugby League in the week following. Marist had adopted the tactic partly due to Laird's eye injury and also as an experiment as Australian sides had been using the tactic for a while. It was said that Laird “played fine football” in the position. Laird was once again named as the “outstanding forward”. He was described as being “outstanding” twice more following Marists match with Ponsonby United on June 22, and their match with City Rovers on July 6.

Unsurprisingly Laird was chosen to play for Auckland against Taranaki on August 3. He had originally been picked in the Auckland B team to play South Auckland on the same day before being moved into the Auckland A side for the Taranaki clash. Auckland ran out easy 37 to 14 winners with it said that Laird was “prominent” for Auckland. After the match he was then selected for the North Island side to play the South Island on August 17. He was selected in the slightly unfamiliar position of hooker for the game. The North Island won an extremely tight match by 19 to 18. Laird, along with his forward teammates Lou Hutt, Cliff Satherley, and W. Large were said to have shown “honest, hard toil from bell to bell”.

Laird played in Marist's round 1 Roope Rooster 18–15 loss to Mount Albert on August 24 and scored a rare pair of tries and was involved in another. He was then named in the Auckland team for their southern tour. Before the tour began he scored a try in a Marist semi-final loss in the Phelan Shield which ended their season.

There were only two matches played on the tour. The first was against Wellington on September 7. Before a crowd of 3,000 in Wellington, Auckland won 39 to 27 with Laird said to have played well. He then played in the second match which was against Canterbury on September 14 at Monica Park in Christchurch. Auckland won 26 to 13 though Laird had to leave the field injured. Laird was well enough to be selected for the Auckland team to play against the Australian side in the first game of their tour. Auckland lost 16 points to 8 at Carlaw Park in front of 15,000 spectators. Laird was said to have been “always in the fray and showed form and speed in the loose”, though he did drop the ball with the line begging at one point.

He was named in the New Zealand team to play Australia in the first test at prop. It was said of his selection that he had “a right to inclusion” based on his performance for the North Island and the match for Auckland against the tourists the previous week. Laird played in the second row alongside Lou Hutt, with Jim Calder locking the scrum. New Zealand played brilliantly to win the match by 22 points to 14 at Carlaw Park before a crowd of 20,000. The forwards produced a fine display. Laird was mentioned as having “never been seen to better advantage and he was one of the best forwards on the field” and he was subsequently selected for the second test. New Zealand was unable to produce their first test heroics and they were soundly beaten in the second test also at Carlaw Park which was played midweek. New Zealand lost 29 points to 8. Laird, Hutt, and Calder were said to have “worked tirelessly in both the tight and loose”. Laird also “just missed a try” early in the match with the score 0-0 after the New Zealand forwards “stormed the visitors’ goal”.

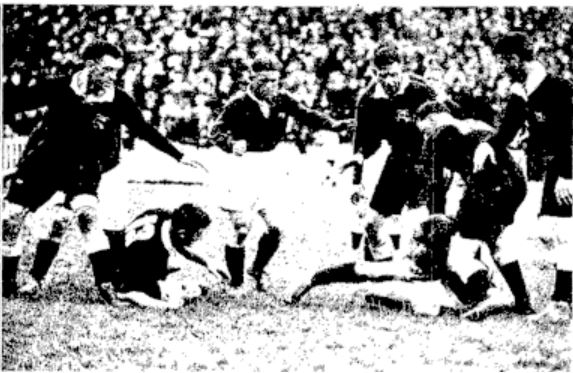
Laird on the right.

He was still selected to play in the third test to be played 3 days later on October 5 once more at Carlaw Park. Australia won the series with a convincing 31–8 win. Laird was involved in a try saving tackle on Viv Thicknesse a foot from the line, and was the most prominent of the forwards along with Harold Tetley and Jim Calder. Following the match Laird was selected for the Auckland XIII team to play against Australia in the final match of their tour however he had suffered a leg injury which ended up becoming much worse than first thought.

=== Injury and retirement ===
Laird was hospitalised with 'water on the knee' and spent several months in Auckland Hospital. At the start of the 1936 season Marist arranged for a benefit day to be held to raise money for him. The third test had been played on October 5 and he was still in hospital at the end of February. Mr. Joe Sayegh who was the Marist chairman spoke at their annual meeting of “Laird’s fine services to the game and delegates assured the board of assistance in any action taken”. On April 13 the Auckland Star reported that the injury “last season may compel his retirement”. The benefit day was held on April 18 and was a series of 4 senior matches at Carlaw Park with the proceeds from the day being spread between the 8 clubs and Laird. Marist won their match by 15 points to 5 over Newton. On May 13 Laird attended the Auckland Rugby League control board meeting to thank the board for the benefit day and also “thanked the ladies’ committee of the league for its kindness to him while in hospital”. The ARL chairman, Mr. G Grey Campbell said that “Laird would be the subject of a little function in the Marist dressing room before the team filed out to play on Saturday”. A week later the Marist club wrote to the league thanking them for their “support and assistance” through the benefit match and that “the amount raised was very creditable to the game”.

In 1937 Laird was elected to be the Marist club captain.
