= South Island rugby league team =

New Zealand rugby league team

Club information
- Nickname: Scorpions
- Colours: Black, White

Current details
- Grounds: Rugby League Park, Christchurch; Trafalgar Park, Nelson; Wingham Park, Greymouth

Records
- Runners-up: 2011

The South Island rugby league team is a rugby league team that represents the South Island of New Zealand. They are nicknamed the Scorpions. The side previously represented the Southern Zone in the Albert Baskerville Trophy. However, they now only compete in the under 15 and under 17 National Competitions. Historically, teams representing the South Island played annual fixtures against the North Island and also played touring international sides.

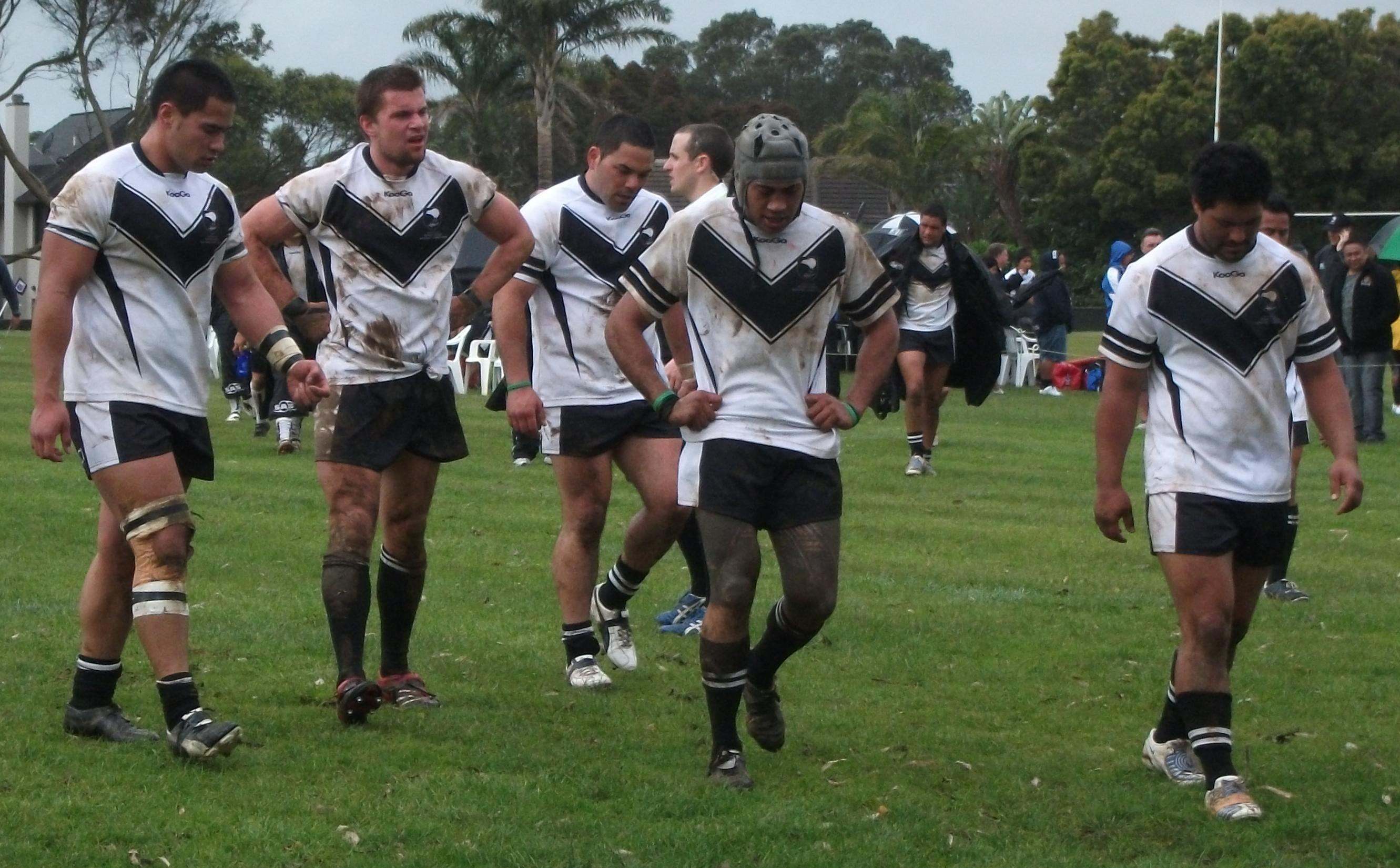
The South Island team in 2010

== Touring Teams ==
Between 1936 and 2001 the South Island team was a semi-frequent opponent for touring international and provincial teams. The South Island have only recorded 3 wins from 15 games against touring teams.

South Island last played an international side when they played France in 2001, losing 24–18. The team included Robert Henare and Aaron Whittaker.

=== Results against Touring Teams ===
Game	Date	Result	Venue	Attendance	Notes
1	1 August 1936	England def. South Island 17–3	Addington Showgrounds, Christchurch	6,000	1936 Great Britain Lions tour
2	27 July 1946	England def. South Island 24–12	Addington Showgrounds, Christchurch	8,000	1946 Great Britain Lions tour
3	24 September 1949	Australia def. South Island 38–8	Addington Showgrounds, Christchurch	2,900	1949 Kangaroo tour of New Zealand
4	30 June 1953	Australia def. South Island 66–9	University Oval, Dunedin	2,956	1953 Kangaroo tour of New Zealand
5	4 August 1954	Great Britain def. South Island 32–11	University Oval, Dunedin	1,154	1954 Great Britain Lions tour
6	3 August 1963	South Island def. South Africa 12–8	Lancaster Park, Christchurch	2,500	1963 South Africa Tour of Australasia
7	2 June 1969	Australia def. South Island 24–15	Addington Showgrounds, Christchurch	3,376	1969 Kangaroo tour of New Zealand
8	6 August 1974	Great Britain def. South Island 33–2	Wingham Park, Greymouth	2,500	1974 Great Britain Lions tour
8	18 September 1976	South Island def. Combined Sydney 18–17	Addington Showgrounds, Christchurch		
9	25 May 1977	Australia def. South Island 68–5	Lancaster Park, Christchurch	2,500	Australia 1977 Rugby League World Cup tour
10	11 June 1980	South Island def. Australia 12–11	Addington Showgrounds, Christchurch	3,000	1980 Kangaroo tour of New Zealand
11	3 June 1981	France def. South Island 16–12	Addington Showgrounds, Christchurch	3,000	1981 French Tour of Australasia
12	15 May 1983	NSW Country def. South Island 22–11	Addington Showgrounds, Christchurch		
13	25 July 1984	Great Britain def. South Island 36–14	Addington Showgrounds, Christchurch	2,581	1984 Great Britain Lions tour
14	23 June 1985	Australia def. South Island 56–0	Addington Showgrounds, Christchurch	6,800	1985 Kangaroo tour of New Zealand
15	2 June 2001	France def. South Island 24–18	Lancaster Park, Christchurch		2001 French Tour of Australasia

== Inter island matches ==
=== 1925 ===
27 June	North Island	27–9	South Island	Carlaw Park 1
2:45	Try: Lou Brown, Ben Davidson, Ernie Herring 3, Horace Dixon, Bert Avery; Con: Frank Delgrosso		Try: Neil Mouat; Pen: Neil Mouat 3	Attendance: 4,000; Referee: W Ripley

=== 1926 ===
3 July	North Island	31–22	South Island	Carlaw Park 1
2:45	Try: Ivan Littlewood, Wally Desmond, Ben Davidson, Jack Kirwan, Hector Cole 2, Bert Avery; Con: Craddock Dufty 5		Try: G Brittenden, T Callentire, Jack Wright, Len Mason; Con: Frank Henry, Neil Mouat; Pen: Frank Henry, Neil Mouat 2	Attendance: 18,000; Referee: Les Bull

=== 1927 ===
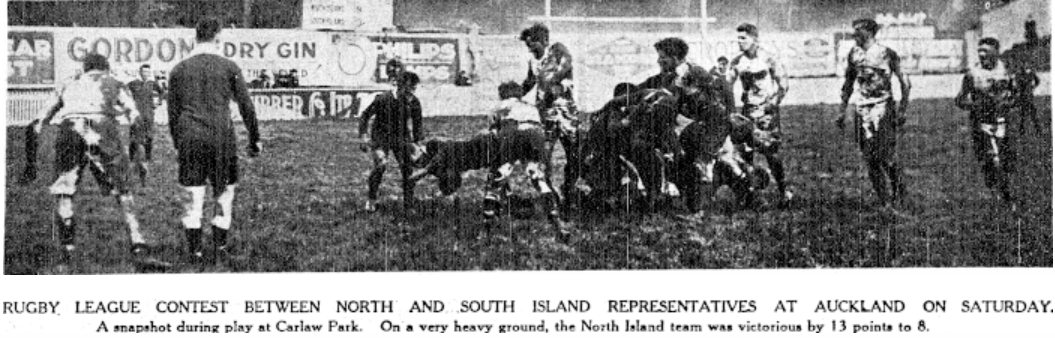

24 September	North Island	13–8	South Island	Carlaw Park 1
3:00	Try: Claude List, G Raynor 2 Con: Craddock Dufty 2		Try: Woods, Hand; Con: Sullivan	Attendance: 7,000; Referee: William Mincham

=== 1928 ===
28 July	North Island	44–8	South Island	Carlaw Park 1
3:00	Try: Roy Hardgrave 2, Hec Brisbane 3, Stan Raynor, Frank Delgrosso 2, Lou Hutt, Tom Timms; Con: Craddock Dufty, Frank Delgrosso 5 Pen: Craddock Dufty		Try: J Spillane, Goodall; Con: J Spillane	Attendance: 10,000; Referee: Les Bull

=== 1929 ===
Len Scott was injured during the match and replaced by Allan Seagar for the North Island while for the South Island Sanders was injured and replaced by Doogan. In past years the North Island team was dominated by players from the Auckland competition however the North Island team on this occasion featured players from outside Auckland such as Ted Meyer, Dick Trautvetter, Bob Stephenson, Joe Menzies, Tom Timms, and T Bergan.

7 September	North Island	13–22	South Island	Carlaw Park 1
3:00	Try: W Hamilton, Ted Meyer, Frank Delgrosso; Con: Charles Gregory, Frank Delgrosso		Try: Alf Townsend, Johnny Dodds, Norm Griffiths, Mick O'Brien; Con: Bond 2 Pen: Bond 3	Attendance: 8,000; Referee: Percy Rogers

=== 1930 ===
For the North Island v South Island trial the Devonport and Ponsonby clubs gave permission for their jerseys to be worn by the respective sides. Mick O’Brien of the South Island team broke his tibia late in the match.

14 June	North Island	22-22	South Island	Carlaw Park 1
2:45	Try: Hec Brisbane 2, Alan Clarke, Tom Timms; Con: Craddock Dufty 4 Pen: Craddock Dufty		Try: Herbert Pearce, T McKenzie, Mick O'Brien, Jim Calder; Con: Herbert Pearce 2, Bert Eckhoff; Pen: Herbert Pearce, Bert Eckhoff	Referee: Les Bull

=== 1931 ===
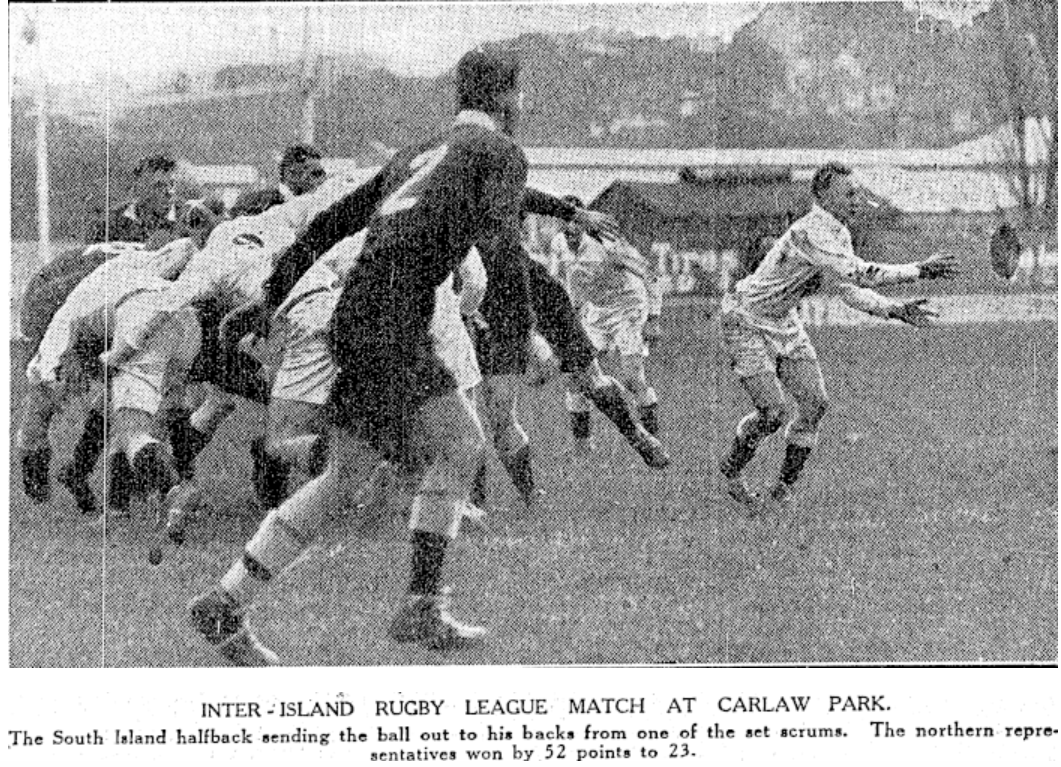

15 August	North Island	52–23	South Island	Carlaw Park 1
3:00	Try: Pat Meehan 4, Claude List 3, Edwin Abbott 2, Hec Brisbane 2, Alan Clarke; Con: Pat Meehan, Claude List, Alan Clarke 5 Pen: Alan Clarke		Try: Falgar 2, Jorgensen, Johnny Dodds, Jonas Masters; Con: Johnny Dodds	Referee: Les Bull

=== 1932 ===
Jim Amos left the field with an injured shoulder for the South Island team and was replaced by E O'Brien.

23 July	North Island	27–18	South Island	Carlaw Park 1
3:00	Try: Len Scott 3, Bert Cooke 3, Claude List; Con: Albert Laing 3		Try: J Devonport, E Hamberger; Con: Jonas Masters, Jim Amos; Pen: Jonas Masters 2, Jim Amos; Drop: E Hamberger	Attendance: 15,000; Referee: Percy Rogers

=== 1934 ===
1 September	North Island	36–18	South Island	Carlaw Park
3:00	Try: George Tittleton, Walter Tittleton, R.E. Smith, Stan Prentice, Bert Cooke 2, Lou Hutt, Cliff Satherley; Con: George Tittleton 3, R.E. Smith 3		Try: M Morris, T O’Connor, W Glynn 2 Con: P Scott 2, E Hamberger	Attendance: 9,000; Referee: Percy Rogers

=== 1935 ===
This was the 10th inter-island match stretching back to 1925. The North Island had won 7, the South Island had won 1 in 1929, with a draw in 1930. Roy Bright, Wilf Hassan and McNeil (Richmond) were selected to play for the North Island but were unavailable. The North Island had 3 players debuting, Bill Telford, Ted Mincham, and W. Large (Hawke's Bay).

17 August	North Island	19-18	South Island	Carlaw Park 1
3:00	Try: Lou Brown, Bert Cooke 2, Roy Powell, Lou Hutt; Con: Cliff Satherley 2		Try: Bill McNeight, Billy Glynn, P Serra 2 Con: Jim Amos, L Young 2	Referee: Maurice Wetherill

=== 1936 ===
During the match R Haslam was running with the ball when he began falling into a hole which had fallen into the ground. In the meantime he had passed the ball and play moved away but was forced to stop once the referee realised what had happened. It had formed near a drain where the water had washed away the soil beneath the ground. A ball boy was photographed standing in the hole ‘buried’ to his waist. The gate receipts for the match were £608 19/ with 15,000 in attendance at the match and the trial curtain-raiser.

11 July	North Island	21-16	South Island	Carlaw Park 1
3:00	Try: Lou Brown 2, Roy Bright, Wally Tittleton, Harold Tetley; Con: John Anderson 2 Pen: John Anderson		Try: E Hendry, J McCarthy; Con: Ces Davison; Pen: Ces Davison 4	Attendance: 15,000; Referee: Percy Rogers

=== 1938 ===
Brian Riley was initially named to play for the North Island side but as he was unable to get leave from work to potentially tour Australia if selected he was replaced in the North Island side.

21 May	North Island	55-2	South Island	Carlaw Park 1
1:30	Try: Gordon Midgley, Rangi Chase 2, Walter Brimble, Des Herring 3, Jack Satherley, Joe Cootes, Angus Gault, Jack Brodrick, Clarry McNeil; Con: Jack Smith 10; Pen: Jack Smith		Pen: P Scott	Referee: Frank Thompson

=== 1939 ===
Wally Tittleton was chosen as the North Island captain while Rex King captained the South Island.

8 July	North Island	35-13	South Island	Carlaw Park 1
3:00	Try: Roy Nurse 2, Wally Tittleton, Laurie Mills, Dave Solomon 2, Pita Ririnui; Con: Jack Hemi 3, Dave Solomon; Pen: Jack Hemi 3		Try: Ces Davison, J Clarke, Rex King; Con: Ces Davison; Pen: Ces Davison	Referee: Ralph Otto

=== 1944 ===
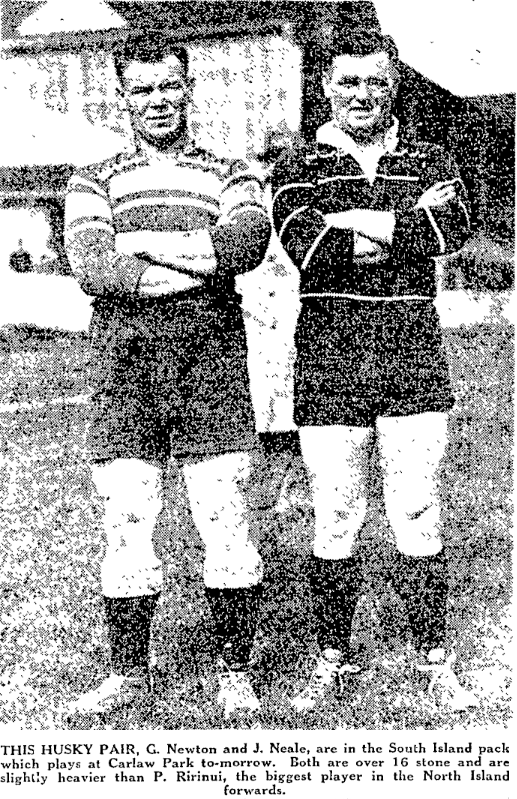

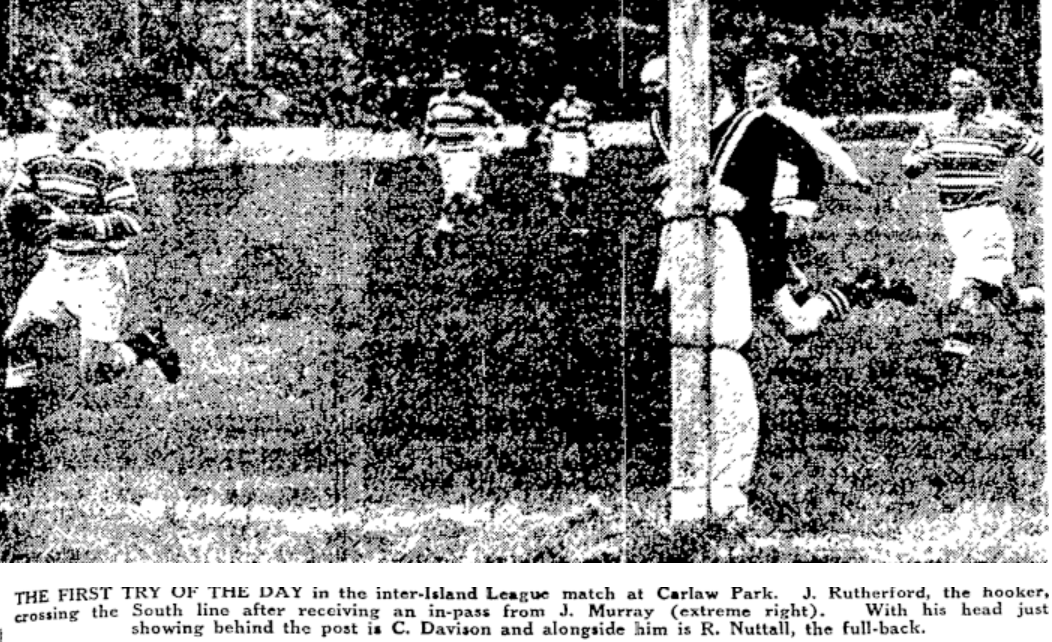

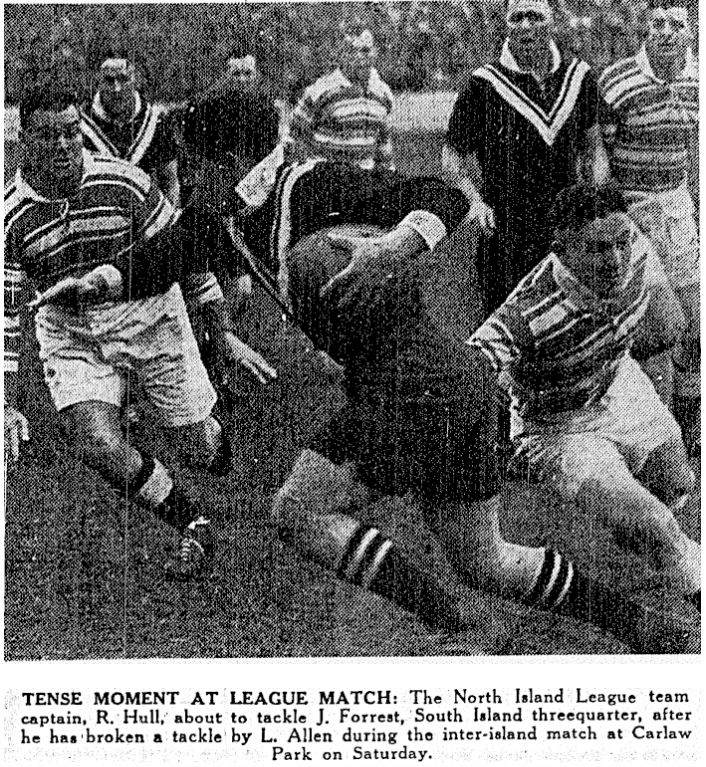

This was the first time since 1939 that the North Island v South Island match had been played. The North Island won comfortably scoring 9 tries to 3. The North Island side featured 10 players from the Auckland competition.

16 September	North Island	43-15	South Island	Carlaw Park 1
3:00	Try: Robert Salaia, O Brooks 3, Jim Murray 3, T Rutherford, F James; Con: O Brooks 8		Try: John Newton 2, P Smith; Con: Ces Davison 3	Referee: J O’Shannessey
