= 1940 in sports =

Note — many sporting events did not take place because of World War II

1940 in sports describes the year's events in world sport.

== Alpine skiing ==
FIS Alpine World Ski Championships

- The 10th FIS Alpine World Ski Championships are cancelled due to World War II

== American football ==
NFL championship

- The Chicago Bears defeat the Washington Redskins 73–0 in the NFL championship game.
  - This game still holds records for the highest score and biggest win in National Football League history.

College championship

- College football national championship – Minnesota Golden Gophers

== Association football ==
- La Liga – won by Athletic Aviación Club
- Serie A – won by S.S. Ambrosiana-Inter
- Primeira Liga – won by F.C. Porto.
- There is no major football competition in England, Scotland or France due to World War II. In England, several regional leagues are set up but statistics from these are not counted in players’ figures.

== Athletics ==
- The 1940 Summer Olympics to be held in Helsinki, were cancelled due to outbreak of World War II. The major international athletics event of the year was thus the annual Finland-Sweden athletics international, held at the new Helsinki Olympic Stadium, exceptionally held as a triple international between Finland, Sweden and Germany.

== Australian rules football ==
- Victorian Football League
  - 28 September: Melbourne wins the 44th VFL Premiership, defeating Richmond 15.17 (107) to 10.8 (68) in the 1940 VFL Grand Final.
  - Brownlow Medal awarded to Des Fothergill (Collingwood) and Herbie Matthews (South Melbourne)
- South Australian National Football League
  - 28 September: Sturt 14.16 (100) defeat South Adelaide 11.13 (79) for their fifth SANFL premiership, but their last until 1966.
- Western Australian National Football League
  - 17 August: Claremont become the first team to score 200 points in a senior WANFL match when they kick 33.22 (220) against Swan Districts.
  - 12 October: Claremont 13.13 (91) defeat South Fremantle 9.20 (74) for their third successive WANFL premiership.

== Baseball ==
- The Cincinnati Reds defeated the Detroit Tigers in the 1940 World Series by 4 games to 3

== Basketball ==
NBL Championship

- Akron Firestone Non-Skids over Oshkosh All-Stars (3–2)

Events

- The eighth South American Basketball Championship in Montevideo is won by Uruguay.

== Boxing ==
Events

- 4 October – Henry Armstrong loses the last of his three world titles when defeated by new World Welterweight Champion Fritzie Zivic over fifteen rounds in New York City

Lineal world champions

- World Heavyweight Championship – Joe Louis
- World Light Heavyweight Championship – Billy Conn
- World Middleweight Championship – vacant
- World Welterweight Championship – Henry Armstrong → Fritzie Zivic
- World Lightweight Championship – Lou Ambers → Lew Jenkins
- World Featherweight Championship – Joey Archibald → Harry Jeffra
- World Bantamweight Championship – vacant → Lou Salica
- World Flyweight Championship – vacant

== Cricket ==
England

- Because of World War II, no first-class cricket is played in England from 1940 to 1944, and the Minor Counties Championship is similarly not contested until 1946.

Australia

- Sheffield Shield – New South Wales
- Most runs – Don Bradman, 1475 @ 122.61 (HS 267)
- Most wickets – Clarrie Grimmett 73 @ 22.65 (BB 6–57)

India

- Ranji Trophy – Maharashtra defeats United Provinces by ten wickets.
- Bombay Pentangular – Hindus

New Zealand

- Plunket Shield – Auckland

South Africa

- The Currie Cup is not contested, but a total of nineteen first-class friendly matches are held. Inter-provincial cricket is abandoned after the 1939–40 season until the end of the war.
- Most runs – Eric Rowan, 590 @ 147.50 (HS 306 not out)
- Most wickets – Norman Gordon 28 @ 14.92 (BB 6–61)

West Indies

- No first-class cricket is played in the 1939–40 season due to the outbreak of World War II, though in later years a few matches are arranged.

== Cycling ==
Tour de France

- not contested due to World War II

Giro d'Italia

- Fausto Coppi

== Figure skating ==
World Figure Skating Championships

- not contested due to World War II

== Golf ==
Men's professional

- Masters Tournament – Jimmy Demaret
- U.S. Open – Lawson Little
- British Open – not played due to World War II
- PGA Championship – Byron Nelson

Men's amateur

- British Amateur – not played due to World War II
- U.S. Amateur – Dick Chapman

Women's professional

- Women's Western Open – Babe Zaharias
- Titleholders Championship – Helen Hicks

== Horse racing ==
- March 2 – in his final race, Seabiscuit wins the $121,000 Santa Anita Handicap

Steeplechases

- Cheltenham Gold Cup – Roman Hackle
- Grand National – Bogskar

Hurdle races

- Champion Hurdle – Solford

Flat races

- Australia – Melbourne Cup won by Old Rowley
- Canada – King's Plate won by Willie the Kid
- France – Prix de l'Arc de Triomphe – not held due to World War II
- Ireland – Irish Derby Stakes won by Turkhan
- English Triple Crown Races:
  1. 2,000 Guineas Stakes – Djebel
  2. The Derby – Pont l'Eveque
  3. St. Leger Stakes – Turkhan
- United States Triple Crown Races:
  1. Kentucky Derby – Gallahadion
  2. Preakness Stakes – Bimelech
  3. Belmont Stakes – Bimelech

== Ice hockey ==
- The New York Rangers defeat the Toronto Maple Leafs 4 games to 2 to win the National Hockey League's Stanley Cup.

== Olympic Games ==
1940 Winter Olympics

- The 1940 Winter Olympics, due to take place at Sapporo, are cancelled due to World War II

1940 Summer Olympics

- The 1940 Summer Olympics, due to take place at Tokyo, are cancelled due to World War II

== Rowing ==
The Boat Race

- Oxford and Cambridge Boat Race is not contested due to World War II

== Rugby league ==
- 1940 New Zealand rugby league season
- 1940 NSWRFL season
- 1939–40 Northern Rugby Football League Wartime Emergency League season / 1940–41 Northern Rugby Football League Wartime Emergency League season

== Rugby union ==
- Five Nations Championship series is not contested due to World War II

== Speed skating ==
Speed Skating World Championships

- not contested due to World War II

== Tennis ==
Australia

- Australian Men's Singles Championship – Adrian Quist (Australia) defeats Jack Crawford (Australia) 6–3, 6–1, 6–2
- Australian Women's Singles Championship – Nancye Wynne Bolton (Australia) defeats Thelma Coyne Long (Australia) 5–7, 6–4, 6–0

England

- Wimbledon Men's Singles Championship – not contested
- Wimbledon Women's Singles Championship – not contested

France

- French Men's Singles Championship – not contested
- French Women's Singles Championship – not contested

USA

- American Men's Singles Championship – Don McNeill (USA) defeats Bobby Riggs (USA) 4–6, 6–8, 6–3, 6–3, 7–5
- American Women's Singles Championship – Alice Marble (USA) defeats Helen Jacobs (USA) 6–2, 6–3

Davis Cup

- 1940 International Lawn Tennis Challenge – not contested

== Awards ==
- Associated Press Male Athlete of the Year – Tom Harmon, College football
- Associated Press Female Athlete of the Year – Alice Marble, Tennis
