= 1938 New Zealand rugby league season =

Seasons
- 1937 1939

The 1938 New Zealand rugby league season was the 31st season of rugby league that had been played in New Zealand.

== International competitions ==
The New Zealand jersey adopted in 1938

New Zealand toured Australia, playing in no Test matches. For this tour the New Zealand Rugby League officially adopted the name the "New Zealand national rugby league team" and added a white V onto their black jerseys for the first time. The Kiwis finished the tour with five wins, one draw and three losses. This included a 30–19 victory against Newcastle. New Zealand were coached by Thomas McClymont and captained by Newton's Bill McNeight. The squad included Jack Hemi, Jack Smith, Rangi Chase, Gordon Midgley, Arthur Kay, Clarry McNeil, Wally Tittleton, Wilfred and Walter Brimble, vice-captain Ray Brown, Jack McLeod, Billy Glynn, John Anderson, Des Herring, Angus Gault, Jack Satherley, Harold Tetley, George Orman, Joe Cootes and Jack Brodrick.

The New South Wales Rugby League's Eastern Suburbs Roosters traveled to Auckland, losing to the Richmond Bulldogs 11–9 at Carlaw Park.

== National competitions ==
=== Northern Union Cup ===
West Coast again held the Northern Union Cup at the end of the season. They defeated Canterbury 19–15 to retain the trophy.

=== Inter-district competition ===
Auckland defeated Canterbury 28–22 at Carlaw Park.

The Canterbury player-coach was Ray Brown, who had returned from Barrow. The team also included Len Brown. Auckland included Jack Hemi and Rangi Chase.

== Club competitions ==
=== Auckland ===
Marist Brothers won the Auckland Rugby League's Fox Memorial Trophy. Richmond won the Roope Rooster, Stormont Shield and Norton Cup while Otahuhu won the Sharman Cup.

Newton played a home and away series with a Canterbury XIII selection. Newton, who included Mt Albert's Bob Banham, drew 16-all with Canterbury XIII at Monica Park in July. They hosted Canterbury XIII three weeks later, winning 22–12.

Richmond included Jack Satherley. Bob Banham joined the Mount Albert Lions as player-coach from the South Sydney Rabbitohs. He was brought over with some assistance from the Auckland and New Zealand Rugby League.

=== Wellington ===
Petone won the Wellington Rugby League's Appleton Shield.

=== Canterbury ===
Linwood won the Canterbury Rugby League's Massetti Cup.

Rakaia was formed with the help of New Zealand international Ces Davison. Due to the distance, the club paid a travel subsidy to travelling teams. Two other Rakaia players, Jack Campbell and George Bellaney, were to become New Zealand representatives in 1939.

=== Other Competitions ===
The Ngongotaha club was founded in 1938.

Addington defeated the Waratah club from Inangahua 40–19 to retain the Thacker Shield.
