= 1939 New Zealand rugby league season =

Seasons
- ← 1938 1940 →

The 1939 New Zealand rugby league season was the 32nd season of rugby league that had been played in New Zealand.

== International competitions ==
New Zealand embarked on a tour of Great Britain and France. The tour was cancelled without any Test matches being play due to the outbreak of World War II.

An "Easts Combined" team from the New South Wales Rugby League traveled to Auckland and lost 17–16 to the Auckland Rugby League's Richmond.

== National competitions ==
=== Northern Union Cup ===
West Coast again held the Northern Union Cup at the end of the season. They successfully defended it against Inangahua 11–8.

== Club competitions ==
=== Auckland ===
Mt Albert won the Auckland Rugby League's Fox Memorial Trophy and the Stormont Shield. The Marist Brothers won the Roope Rooster, Otahuhu won the Sharman Cup and Richmond won the Norton Cup.

George Mitchell and Dave Solomon played for Richmond, while Ponsonby included Sydney's Frank Bell. Bob Banham was Mount Albert's player-coach.

John A. Lee was the Auckland Rugby League's chairman.

=== Wellington ===
Central won the Wellington Rugby League's Appleton Shield.

=== Canterbury ===
Addington won the Canterbury Rugby League's Massetti Cup.

=== Other Competitions ===
Greymouth Marist defeated Addington 20–19 to win the Thacker Shield.
