= 1942 New Zealand rugby league season =

Seasons
- 1941 1943

The 1942 New Zealand rugby league season was the 35th season of rugby league in New Zealand.

== International competitions ==
New Zealand played in no international matches due to World War II.

== National competitions ==
=== Northern Union Cup ===
West Coast again held the Northern Union Cup at the end of the season.

== Club competitions ==
=== Auckland ===
Manukau won the Auckland Rugby League's Fox Memorial Trophy and Stormont Shield. The Rukutai Shield was won by City-Otahuhu. Richmond won the Roope Rooster.

Owing to the World War; Marist and North Shore briefly amalgamated at senior level in 1942 as did Mount Albert and Newton, and City and Otahuhu. However it was unpopular and the following year they reverted to individual clubs.

=== Wellington ===
Miramar won the Wellington Rugby League's Appleton Shield.

=== Canterbury ===
Hornby-Rakaia-Riccarton won the Canterbury Rugby League's Massetti Cup.

The competition consisted of; Brigade A, Brigade B, Battery, Canterbury Regiment, A.S.C, Addington, Linwood-Woolston and Hornby-Rakaia-Riccarton.

=== Other Competitions ===
Blackball defeated Hornby-Rakaia-Riccarton 21–8 to retain the Thacker Shield.
