= Frank Solomon =

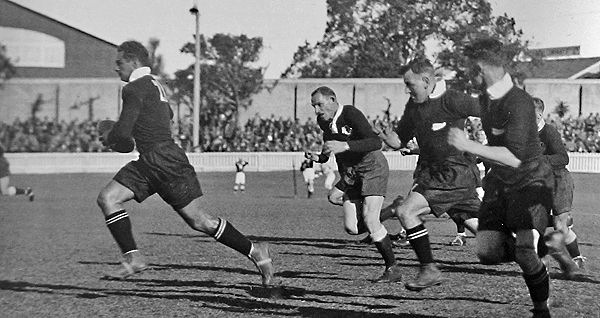
- Solomon (left) powers through the Australian defence during the inaugural Bledisloe Cup match at the Sydney Cricket Ground in 1932
- Born: Frank Solomona; 30 May 1906 Pago Pago, American Samoa
- Died: 21 December 1991 (aged 85) Auckland, New Zealand
- Height: 1.83 m (6 ft 0 in)
- Weight: 89 kg (196 lb)
- School: Seddon Memorial Technical College (now Auckland University of Technology)
- Notable relative(s): Dave Solomon (step brother); Josh Kronfeld (great-nephew)

Rugby union career
- Position(s): Wing forward, No. 8
Amateur team(s)
Years	Team	Apps	(Points)
1929	Ponsonby RFC		
Provincial / State sides
Years	Team	Apps	(Points)
1925-39	Auckland	54	(3)
International career
Years	Team	Apps	(Points)
1931-32	New Zealand	3	(9)
- Correct as of 10 August 2014

Frank Solomon (30 May 1906 – 21 December 1991) was an American-born New Zealand rugby union footballer. He has played national provincial rugby for Auckland and international rugby for the All Blacks. Considered a Pacific pioneer in New Zealand rugby, Solomon became the first Samoan to play for the All Blacks. He was the older step-brother of former All Black Dave Solomon and the great-uncle of former All Black Josh Kronfeld.

Solomon was the first U.S. national of Samoan descent to play for a New Zealand national rugby team. The second was Jerome Kaino in 2004.

== Early life ==
Solomon was born on 30 May 1906 in the American Samoan capital of Pago Pago as the oldest of two. He was born 6 years after 'Eastern Samoa' (present day American Samoa) became a U.S. Territory, which divided Samoa into two administrative territories according to the Tripartite Convention. The governor of American Samoa at the time of Solomon's birth was Charles Moore from Decatur, Illinois. While the United States occupied the eastern portion, the Germans occupied the western portion (consisting of Savaii and Upolu) known as German Samoa at the time. It wasn't until 1914, New Zealand occupied the German territory without resistance from the Germans. Thus changed the name from German Samoa to Western Samoa until 1997. Solomon's father was the mayor of the former Fijian capital of Levuka and during that time when he and his step-brother Dave were educated, Solomon and his family moved to the Samoan capital of Apia before finally reaching to Auckland, New Zealand in 1921. It was at that time Solomon spent his last school days at Seddon Memorial Technical College (now Auckland University of Technology).

== International rugby career ==
Solomon had achieved the unusual distinction of winning a New Zealand Maori jersey. It wasn't unusual on the strength of his playing ability, as he had plenty of that, or for the fact that he wasn't a regular in first-class player, as that was also a common scenario at the time, but for the fact nobody had bothered to check that he was actually Maori. With Islanders being something of a novelty in New Zealand back then, it was automatically assumed his skin owed its colour to Maori blood, and into the team he went.

He was one of the better players on that 1927 internal tour, and nobody caught up with the fact he was there under false pretences. After appearing in seven of the first eight matches, he had to pack his bags and go back to Auckland to avoid being sacked from his job.

Solomon won his test cap in 1931 making him the first ever Samoan to wear the All Black jersey. He gave a strong display at Eden Park in a match New Zealand was lucky to win. He toured Australia in 1932, winning the test spot after missing an ordinary All Black effort in the first match, and became, in combination with Hugh McLean, one of the most impressive units in the team as well as having the distinction of leading the All Black Haka before the game. Surprisingly, that was the end of his international football, although he remained an Auckland regular until shortly before the war, eventually playing 54 games in the blue and white. Strongly built, at 6 ft (1.83m) and a tick under 14 stone (89 kg), he was often mentioned as one of Auckland's better forwards.

He, like brother Dave, had three trials for the 1935-36 team to Britain, but, unlike Dave, Frank missed out. There was a feeling this may have been a mistake, especially early in the tour when the All Blacks were still struggling to come to grips with the three-fronted scrum and an experienced head may have proved invaluable. Frank Solomon played his last representative matches for Auckland in 1939, before turning out a few times for the Barbarians and ending his career with a few service matches in England.

== Military career ==
Wartime saw Solomon serving with the 2NZEF where he quickly became a Company Sergeant Major, and later a commissioned lieutenant.

== Death ==
Solomon died in Auckland on 21 December 1991, aged 85.

== Legacy ==
Solomon rose to a high position in Samoan society and, when the big migration to New Zealand started in the 60s and 70s, he became a man of some influence in the country.

The Solomon influence in rugby extended beyond his playing days; he was a figure of importance to the Polynesian players who later came to Ponsonby and his All Black jersey, presented to the Western Samoa Rugby Union in 1986, was a treasured memento.
