= 1941 New Zealand rugby league season =

Seasons
- ← 1940 1942 →

The 1941 New Zealand rugby league season was the 34th season of rugby league that had been played in New Zealand.

== International competitions ==
New Zealand played in no international matches due to World War II.

== National competitions ==
=== Northern Union Cup ===
West Coast again held the Northern Union Cup at the end of the season. They successfully defended it against Inangahua 17–4.

== Club competitions ==
=== Auckland ===
North Shore won the Auckland Rugby League's Fox Memorial Trophy and the Rukutai Shield. Manukau won the Roope Rooster and Stormont Shield while Otahuhu won the Sharman Cup.

During the year former Kiwi Laurie Mills was killed in action in Egypt during the Western Desert campaign.

Marist included Johnny Simpson while Arthur Kay and Bob Scott played for Ponsonby.

=== Wellington ===
Miramar won the Wellington Rugby League's Appleton Shield.

=== Canterbury ===
Sydenham won the Canterbury Rugby League's Massetti Cup.

Woolston regained senior status while Hornby and Rakaia amalgamated their senior teams.
