= Herbert Pearce =

New Zealand rugby league footballer

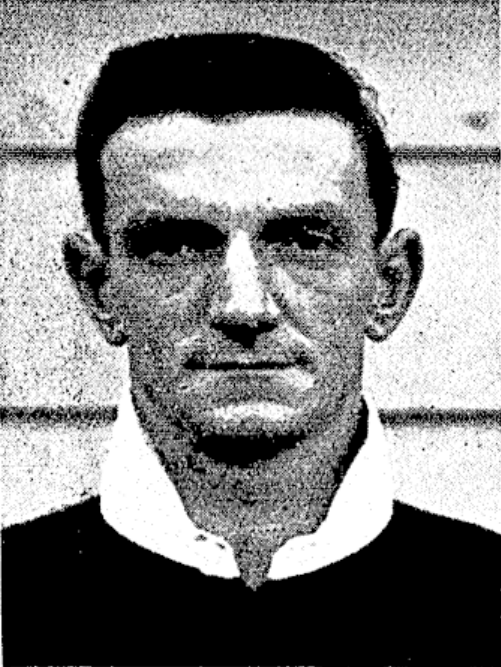

Personal information
- Full name: Herbert John Pearce
- Born: 3 April 1908; Christchurch, New Zealand
- Died: 4 November 1955 (aged 47); Foveaux Strait, New Zealand

Playing information
- Position: Centre, Wing
Representative
Years	Team	Pld	T	G	FG	P
1926–27	Canterbury
1928–29	Otago
1930	New Zealand	4	0	0	0	0
1930	South Island	1	1	3	0	9

Herbert John Pearce (3 April 1908 – 4 November 1955) was a New Zealand rugby league player who represented New Zealand.

== Early life ==
Pearce was born, raised and educated in Christchurch.

== Playing career ==
After playing rugby league for the Marist Club and Canterbury from 1926 to 1927, Pearce moved south to Dunedin and joined the Christian Brothers Rugby League Club. Considered at the time to be one of the fastest league wingers in the country, Pearce represented Otago in 1928 and 1929 before gaining national selection in 1930, when the New Zealand side toured Australia, playing in two matches against New South Wales. He also represented the South Island in 1930.

He later drowned in Foveaux Strait in 1955, and was buried at Bluff Cemetery.
