= John Anderson (rugby league, born 1913) =

New Zealand international rugby league footballer

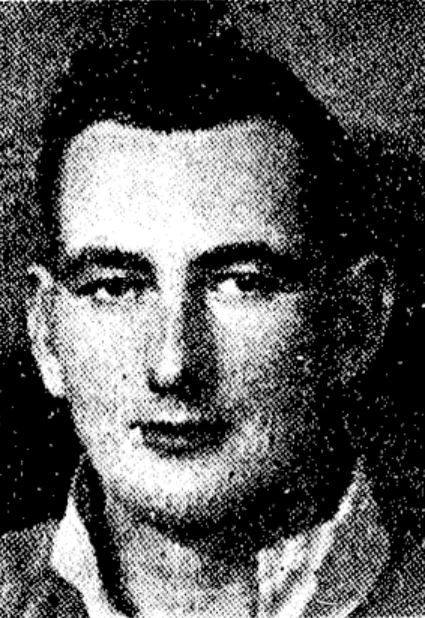

Personal information
- Born: 19 October 1913 Scotland
- Died: 17 September 1984 (aged 70)

Playing information
- Weight: 72.5 kg (11 st 6 lb)
- Position: Loose forward
Club
Years	Team	Pld	T	G	FG	P
1932–33	Blackball (WCRL)	2	2	10	0	28
1936–41	Marist (ARL)	111	56	215	2	593
1944	Point Chevalier	5	3	4	0	17
1945	Marist	17	2	41	2	92
1945	Town (Marist & City)	1	1	3	0	9
1945	AKL Watersiders	1	1	0	0	3
	Total	137	65	273	4	742
Representative
Years	Team	Pld	T	G	FG	P
1935	West Coast	1	3	0	0	9
	Canterbury
1935	South Island	1	0	0	0	0
1936–37	Auckland	2	5	2	0	19
1936	North Island	1	0	3	0	6
1938	New Zealand	5	6	3	0	24

John Anderson (19 October 1913 – 17 September 1984) was a New Zealand rugby league footballer who represented New Zealand.

== Playing career ==
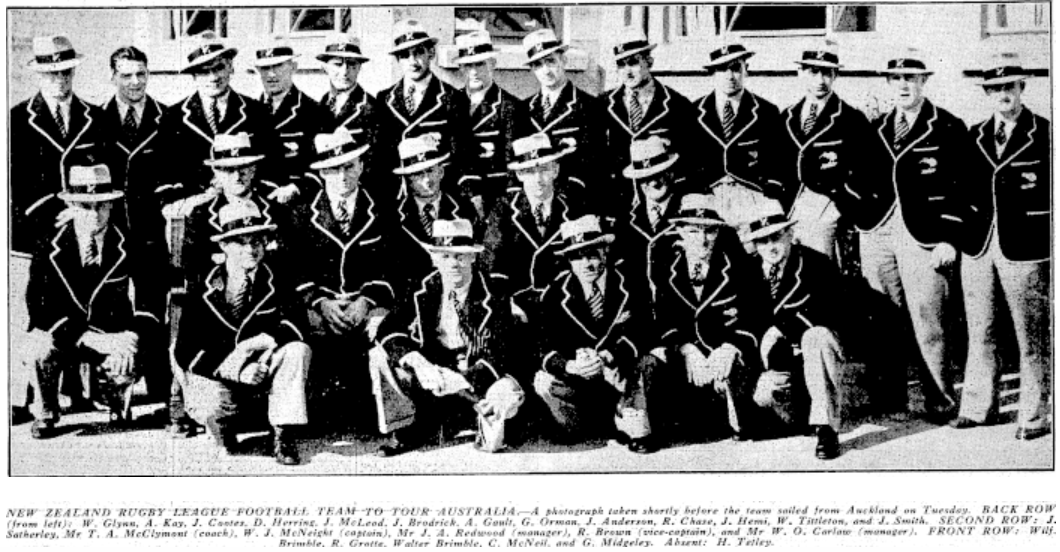
The 1938 NZ team to tour Australia.

Anderson originally played for Blackball in the West Coast Rugby League competition. He represented the West Coast, Canterbury and the South Island.

=== Auckland and Marist ===
In 1936 Anderson moved to Auckland, joining the Marist Old Boys club and becoming the club captain. With Marist he won the 1938 Fox Memorial championship and the Roope Rooster in 1937 and 1939. Anderson also represented Auckland and the North Island.

In 1938 Anderson toured Australia with the New Zealand team. No test matches were played on the tour however Anderson was the second highest point scorer with 6 tries and 27 goals.

Anderson was one of the most prolific point scorers in Auckland rugby league history.

=== Army rugby ===
During the war years Anderson played rugby for an Army side.

=== Point Chevalier ===
In 1944 Anderson transferred to the Point Chevalier club during the second round of the competition not having played in the league for 3 seasons. He scored a try in a loss to Ponsonby on 29 July and then soon after requested a transfer back to his old Marist club.
