= 1940 New Zealand rugby league season =

Seasons
- ← 1939 1941 →

The 1940 New Zealand rugby league season was the 33rd season of rugby league that had been played in New Zealand.

== International competitions ==
New Zealand played in no international matches due to World War II.

== National competitions ==
=== Northern Union Cup ===
West Coast again held the Northern Union Cup at the end of the season. They successfully defended it against Inangahua 7–5.

== Club competitions ==
=== Auckland ===
Richmond won the Auckland Rugby League's Fox Memorial Trophy, Roope Rooster and Norton Cup. North Shore won the Rukutai Shield and Stormont Shield while Otahuhu won the Sharman Cup.

Bob Banham was Mount Albert's player-coach before returning to Sydney in September 1940 with the intention of joining the Australian forces. He played several games for the South Sydney Rabbitohs in 1941.

=== Wellington ===
St George won the Wellington Rugby League's championship. During the year Will Appleton was elected president of the Wellington Rugby League. He would serve until 1958 and present the League with the Appleton Shield.

=== Canterbury ===
Sydenham won the Canterbury Rugby League's Massetti Cup.

=== Other competitions ===
Blackball won the West Coast Rugby League competition and received no challenge for the Thacker Shield.
