= Bert Eckhoff =

New Zealand international rugby league & union footballer

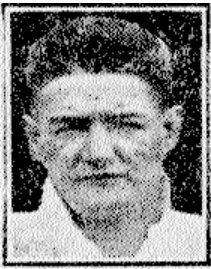

Personal information
- Full name: Albertus John Eckhoff
- Born: 18 October 1901
- Died: 9 December 1967 (aged 66)

Playing information
- Weight: 80.7 kg (12 st 10 lb)

Rugby union
- Position: Hooker, Lock
Club
Years	Team	Pld	T	G	FG	P
1922–24	Zingari-Richmond	34	2	1	0	8
Representative
Years	Team	Pld	T	G	FG	P
1922	Otago B	5	0	0	0	0
1923	Otago	2	0	0	0	0

Rugby league
- Position: Prop, Second-row, Centre, Stand-off
Club
Years	Team	Pld	T	G	FG	P
1925–32	City	101	26	88	4	262
1930	Combined Teams	1	0	0	0	0
	Total	102	26	88	4	262
Representative
Years	Team	Pld	T	G	FG	P
1924–29	Otago	20	0	33	0	66
1925–29	Otago Trial Teams	6	4	9	0	30
1925–26	Otago-West Coast	2	0	0	0	0
1926–31	South Island	5	0	0	0	0
1926	New Zealand C	1	0	0	0	0
1928–30	New Zealand	14 (1)	1	8	0	19
1928	New Zealand XIII	1	1	0	0	3

Albertus "Bert" John Eckhoff (18 October 1901 – 9 December 1967) was a professional New Zealand rugby league footballer who played in the 1920s. He played at representative level for New Zealand, South Island and Otago, as a prop, or second-row.

== Rugby career ==
Bert Eckhoff began his career playing club rugby for the Zingari-Richmond club in Otago in 1922. He made 5 appearances for the Otago B side that same season. He was listed in the reserves to play Auckland for the full Otago side but did not take the field. In 1923 he was in the reserves to play for Otago in further matches and made his debut coming on for an injured player in their match with Auckland on 1 September. He then also played against North Otago a month later.

In 1924 while playing a club match for Zingari-Richmond against Alhambra on 21 June he was alleged to have kicked an opponent in the chest as he lay on the ground following a scrum. A lengthy meeting was held by the Otago union looking into the matter involving numerous witnesses as they sought to find the offending player. Eventually it was concluded that Eckhoff was the offender and after a further period of debate it was decided to suspend him until July 1926. Soon after this Eckhoff switched to rugby league which at that time did not recognise suspensions in the rugby code as it does today. Despite multiple appeals the union stuck to their original decision.

== Switch to rugby league ==
In 1924 Eckhoff joined the newly formed City Rovers club based in Dunedin though they did not play any matches as it was the tail end of the season. He was selected to play for the Otago side against Canterbury which they won on 6 September, and he was again in the victorious side which defeated the same opponents a month later on 4 October.

During the 1932 season Eckhoff decided to retire from playing and to make himself available as a referee. However he was soon drawn out of retirement to play the remainder of the year for City who were having a strong season. In so doing he brought up his 100th appearance for City.

He retired at the end of the season and refereed senior matches each week throughout 1933 and 1934 before the competition in Otago ceased entirely.

=== International honours ===
Eckhoff represented New Zealand in 1928 in the 3rd test against Great Britain. He was selected for the 1930 NZ tour of Australia where he was appointed vice-captain.
