= Old Rowley =

Racehorse belonging to Charles II of England

Old Rowley was the name of a stallion racehorse belonging to King Charles II (1660-1685) of England. The Rowley Mile Racecourse at Newmarket, Suffolk, developed by the king as a national centre for horseracing, is named after the horse. As the stallion was libidinous and "renowned for the number and beauty of its offspring", Old Rowley became a nickname for the king himself, who had many mistresses and sired many illegitimate children.

== Ballad ==
The first verse of the old anonymous lewd ballad Old Rowley the King, sung to the tune of Old Simon the King, is as follows:

This making of bastards great,
And duchessing every whore,
The surplus and treasury cheat,
Have made me damnable poor,
Quoth old Rowley the King,
Quoth old Rowley the King,
At council board,
Where every lord
Is led like a dog in a string.

== Mrs Holford anecdote ==
A traditional anecdote concerning a "Mrs Holford" was first related in 1769 by James Granger as follows:

In some of the state poems, Charles the Second is ridiculed under the nickname of Old Rowley; which was an ill-favoured stallion, kept in the Mews, but remarkable for getting fine colts. Mrs. Holford, a young lady of considerable attractions, much admired by Charles, was sitting in her apartment, and singing a ballad upon "Old Rowley, the king," when he knocked at the door. Upon her asking who was there? he, with his usual good humour, replied, " Old Rowley himself, madam."

The story was later related in 1808 in the Edinburgh Budget of Wit as follows:

Charles II was frequently ridiculed by the wits of the time by the nickname of Old Rowley, an ill-favoured stallion kept in the King's meuse, and very remarkable for being the sire of many fine colts. Mrs Holford, a young lady much admired by Charles, was one day singing a satirical ballad on Old Rowley the King, when his Majesty knocked at the door of her chamber. Upon her asking who was there? the King, with his usual good humour, replied, "Old Rowley himself, Madam".

A later renditioning of the story by Wheatley (1933) relates that the king at one of his palaces

"paus(ed) one morning opposite the apartments of the Maids of Honour, his attention caught by the treble rendering of an exceedingly lewd song about himself, in which he was compared to his lusty stallion, "Old Rowley". He knocked upon the door. "Who's there ?" came the voice of Mrs. Howard, (sic) the mistress of the Maids, " ’Tis Old Rowley himself, ma’am," replied Charles with a smile as he poked his nose round the crack of the door".
