= Wally Desmond =

New Zealand international rugby league footballer

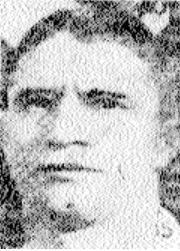

Personal information
- Full name: Walter Leslie Desmond
- Born: 6 January 1906 New Zealand
- Died: 1993 (aged 86–87)

Playing information
- Height: 5 ft 8 in (1.73 m)
- Weight: 11 st 10 lb (74 kg)
- Position: Wing, Centre, Stand-off
Club
| Years | Team | Pld | T | G | FG | P |
|---|---|---|---|---|---|---|
| 1925 | Linwood | 12 | 7 | 10 | 1 | 43 |
| 1925 | Inangahua | 2 | 0 | 1 | 0 | 2 |
| 1927–29 | Leeds | 42 | 10 | 0 | 0 | 30 |
| 1929–30 | → Castleford (trial) | 2 | 0 | 0 | 0 | 0 |
| 1930–31 | Batley | 50 | 5 | 10 | 0 | 35 |
| 1931–33 | Bramley | 56 | 1 | 29 | 0 | 61 |
| | Total | 164 | 23 | 50 | 1 | 171 |
Representative
| Years | Team | Pld | T | G | FG | P |
| 1925 | Canterbury | 2 | 5 | 3 | 0 | 19 |
| 1925 | West Coast | 1 | 1 | 0 | 0 | 3 |
| 1926 | Wellington | 1 | 2 | 0 | 0 | 6 |
| 1926 | North Island | 1 | 1 | 0 | 0 | 3 |
| 1926 | New Zealand XIII | 1 | 1 | 0 | 0 | 3 |
| 1926 | NZ Trial | 1 | 2 | 0 | 0 | 6 |
| 1926–27 | New Zealand | 16 (1) | 9 | 0 | 0 | 27 |

Walter Leslie Desmond (born 6 January 1906) was a New Zealand professional rugby league footballer who played in the 1920s and 1930s. He played at representative level for New Zealand, and Wellington, and at club level for Leeds, Castleford, Batley and Bramley, as a wing, centre, or stand-off, and he was Chairman of the Leeds & District rugby league referees' society in the late 1950s and early 1960s.

== Playing career ==
=== International honours ===
He was selected for the New Zealand side to tour England and Wales in July 1926. Before they departed he played for New Zealand against Auckland on 31 July and he scored a try in a 52-32 loss. On their tour he played he played in 15 matches and scored 8 tries. Desmond's only test appearance was against Great Britain on 2 October 1926. He played stand-off in New Zealand's 20-28 defeat by Great Britain at Central Park, Wigan.

=== Club and domestic career ===
Desmond began playing rugby league for the Linwood club in the Canterbury Rugby League competition in the early 1920s. He was their 5th grade captain in 1922. He made his debut for the senior side in 1925. They struggled to win many matches but Desmond stood out for them and scored 7 tries and kicked 11 goals in 12 matches. He played for Canterbury in 2 matches against a combined Otago-West Coast side and then against West Coast. Against Otago-West Coast on 13 June he scored 2 tries, while against the West Coast on 22 August he scored 4 tries and kicked 2 conversions. Late in the year he transferred to Greymouth where he joined the Inangahua club before requesting a transfer to Runanga. A week later however he played for Inangahua, kicking a conversion in their 11-8 knockout loss to Blackball. Then on 23 September he played for West Coast against the touring Queensland. The West Coast lost 27-10 with Desmond scoring 1 try.

In 1926 he transferred to Wellington however there was no club competition there so he only played in a trial match and then for the Wellington against South Auckland on 23 June where he scored 2 tries. Following this he played for the North Island against the South Island at Carlaw Park. The North Island won 31 to 22 with Desmond again scoring a try. On 7 July he played for the 'Rest of New Zealand' against Auckland. His side won 28-21 and he scored 1 try. Following this he played in a New Zealand trial match for the Probables on July and once again found the try line, this time twice however his side lost 32-15.

Desmond made his début for Leeds scoring 2-tries in the 31-5 victory over Keighley at Headingley Stadium on Saturday 29 October 1927, he signed for Batley from Leeds on 30 January 1930, and he made his début for Batley against Hunslet at Mount Pleasant, Batley on Saturday 1 February 1930, he and centre/halfback J. Whitaker signed for Bramley from Batley on 29 September 1931, with Bramley's Welsh forward Charles Walker transferred to Batley from Bramley.

== Personal life ==
Desmond married Norah Ellen Hill on 1 April 1933 at St Michael's Church, Buslingthorpe, Leeds.
