= Bill McNeight =

New Zealand international rugby league footballer

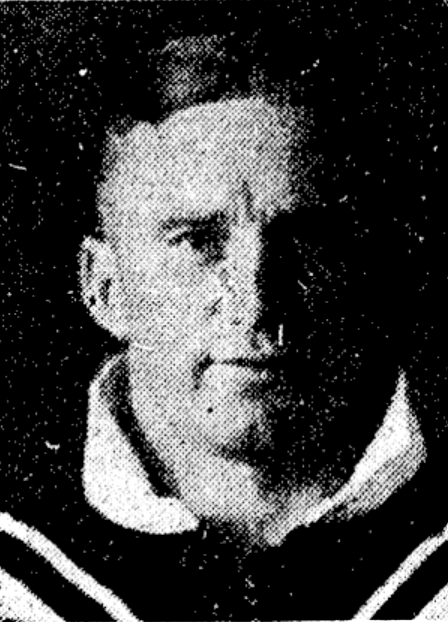

Personal information
- Full name: William John McNeight
- Born: 13 June 1907 New Zealand
- Died: 21 August 1966 (aged 59)

Playing information
- Position: Second-row
Club
Years	Team	Pld	T	G	FG	P
	Unknown (WCRL)
1937–38	Newton Rangers		6	0	0	18
	Total	0	6	0	0	18
Representative
Years	Team	Pld	T	G	FG	P
1936	West Coast
1936	South Island
1936–38	New Zealand	2	0	0	0	0
1938	Auckland

Bill McNeight was a New Zealand rugby league player who represented New Zealand.

== Playing career ==
McNeight first made the New Zealand side in 1936, while playing for the West Coast. He played in two test matches for New Zealand that year and also played for the South Island.

In July, 1937 McNeight moved to Auckland, joining the Newton Rangers club. He captained New Zealand on their 1938 tour of Australia, however no test matches were played on tour.
