= Dave Solomon (rugby) =

New Zealand international dual-code rugby player (1913-1997)

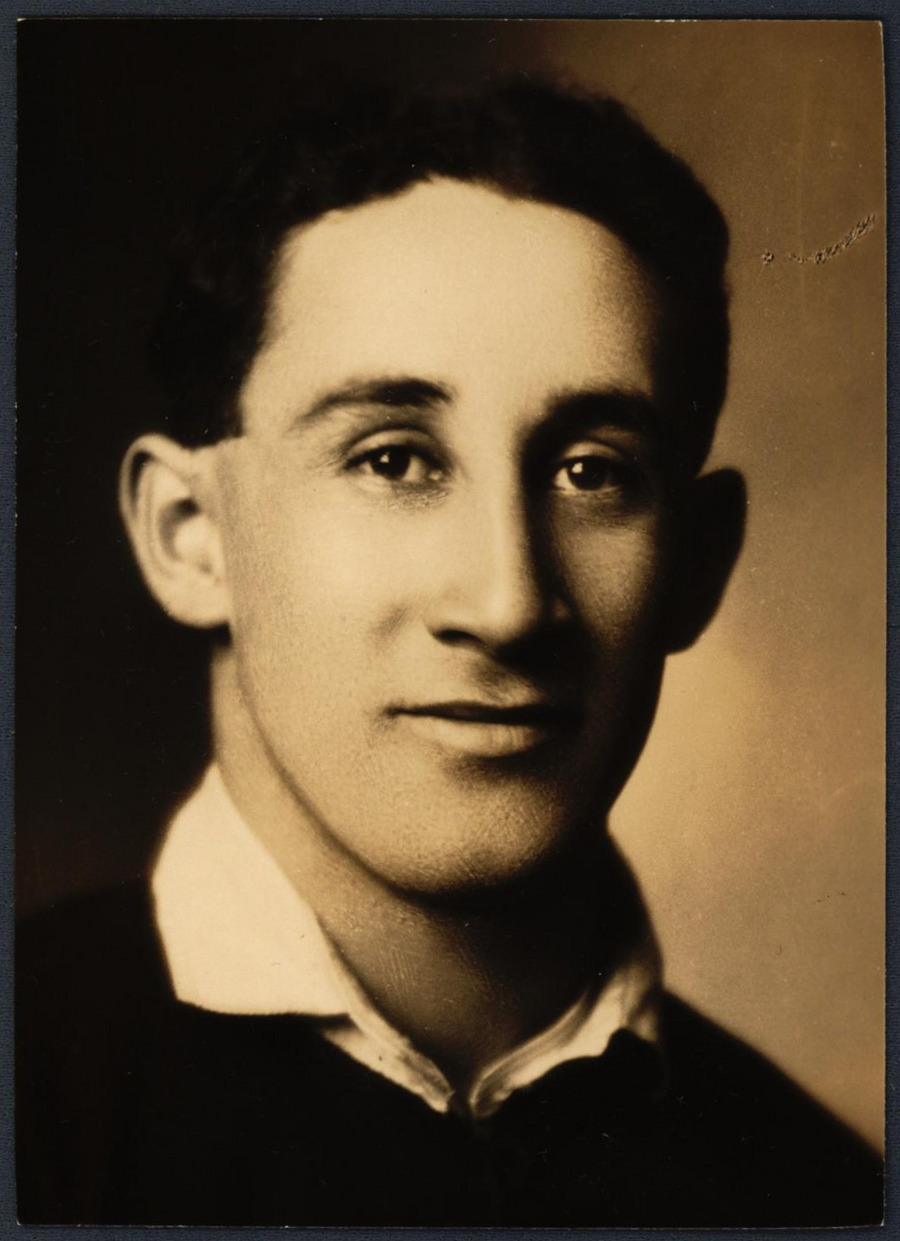
- Solomon in 1935

Personal information
- Full name: David Solomona
- Born: 31 May 1913 Levuka, Fiji
- Died: 15 August 1997 (aged 84) Auckland, New Zealand

Playing information
- Height: 173 cm (5 ft 8 in)
- Weight: 76 kg (12 st 0 lb)

Rugby union
- Position: Fullback, first five-eighth
Club
Years	Team	Pld	T	G	FG	P
1935–38	Ponsonby RFC	50	32	14	0	129
Representative
Years	Team	Pld	T	G	FG	P
1934	Waikato
1935–1938	Auckland	26	6	0	0	18
1935–36	New Zealand	8	1	0	0	3

Rugby league
- Position: Stand-off
Club
Years	Team	Pld	T	G	FG	P
1939–41	Richmond Rovers	46	21	13	0	89
Representative
Years	Team	Pld	T	G	FG	P
1939	North Island	1	1	1	0	5
1939	New Zealand	1	0	0	0	0
1940–41	Auckland Māori (Tamaki)	4	0	0	0	0
1941	Auckland	1	0	0	0	0

Dave Solomon (31 May 1913 – 15 August 1997) was a Fijian-born rugby football player who represented New Zealand in both rugby union (as a five-eighth and fullback) and rugby league. His brother Frank Solomon was also an All Black.

== Early years ==
Solomon attended Mt Albert Grammar, and was in the 1st XV in 1931.

== Rugby union career ==
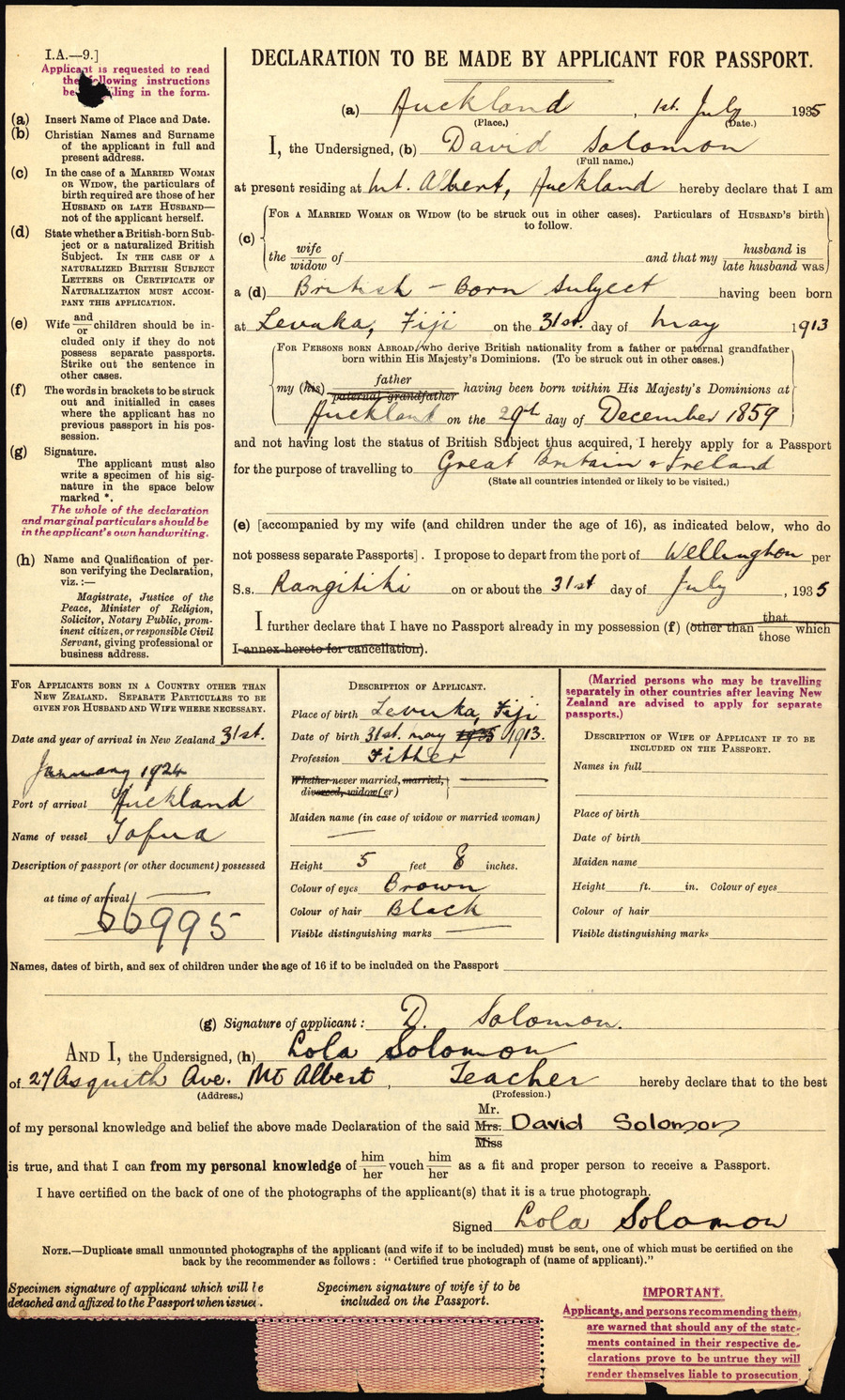
David Solomon passport application (1935)

Playing with the Ponsonby rugby union club, Solomon moved south; playing for the Matamata sub-union 1932–43 and represented the Waikato Rugby Union in 1934 before moving back home and playing for Auckland 1935–38, in every back position except wing. He made the 1935 All Blacks tour and travelled with the squad to Great Britain, playing in eight tour matches in 1934–35 and scored 3 points (a try) for New Zealand.

== Rugby league career ==
In 1939 Solomon switched codes to play rugby league. He was named in the 1939–40 New Zealand national rugby league team squad, however the tour was cut short by World War II.

== Return to rugby union ==
After the war he returned to rugby union, and coached the East Coast Bays and Northcote clubs on the North Shore.

== Later years ==
Solomon became a Samoan Matai. He died in Auckland on 15 August 1997.
