= Ted Meyer =

New Zealand international rugby league footballer

Personal information
- Full name: Edward Arthur Meyer
- Born: 27 January 1907
- Died: 5 June 1981 (aged 74)

Playing information
- Position: Stand-off, Wing
Representative
Years	Team	Pld	T	G	FG	P
≤1930–≥30	Northland
1930	New Zealand	4	2	0	0	6

Edward Arthur Meyer (27 January 1907 – 5 June 1981) was a New Zealand professional rugby league footballer who played in the 1930s. He played at representative level for New Zealand, and Northland, as a stand-off.

== International honours ==
Meyer represented New Zealand in 1930 against Australia.
