= Joe Menzies =

New Zealand international rugby league footballer

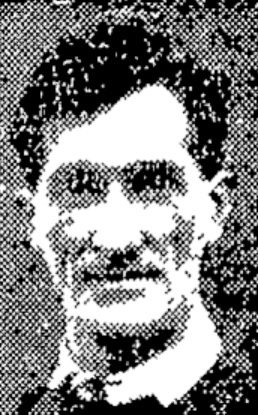

Personal information
- Full name: Arthur Briton Menzies
- Born: 13 May 1892 Norfolk Island
- Died: 31 October 1960 (aged 68) Ngāruawāhia, New Zealand

Playing information
- Position: Prop
Club
Years	Team	Pld	T	G	FG	P
1920–32	Ngaruawahia	26	6	1	0	20
1920	Hamilton	1	1	0	0	3
	Total	27	7	1	0	23
Representative
Years	Team	Pld	T	G	FG	P
1920–32	Waikato	20	2	3	0	12
1925	New Zealand XIII	1	3	0	0	0
1925	Auckland Province	1	0	0	0	0
1926–27	New Zealand	12 (1)	1	0	0	3
1927	New Zealand (AKL Members)	1	1	0	0	3
1929–30	North Island	2	0	0	0	0

Arthur Briton Menzies (13 May 1892 – 31 October 1960), also known by the nickname of "Joe", was a New Zealand professional rugby league footballer who played in the 1920s. He played at representative level for New Zealand, and Waikato, and at club level for the Ngaruawahia Panthers, as a prop.

== International honours ==
Menzies represented New Zealand in 1926 against Wales.

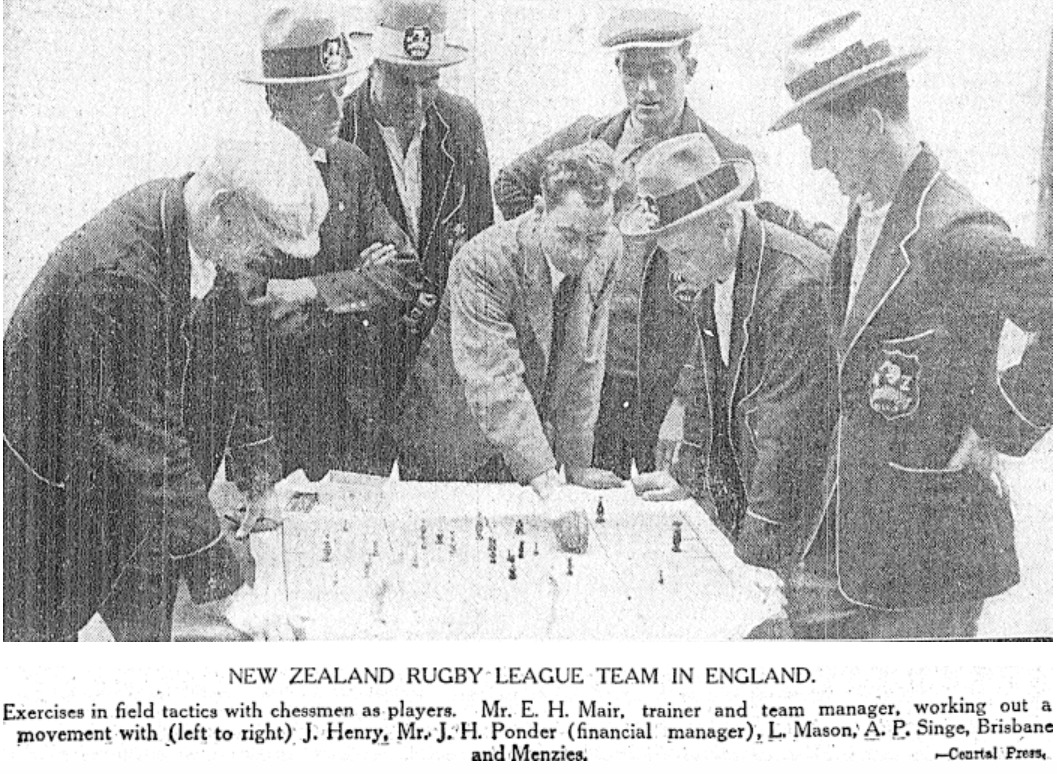
