= 1953 New Zealand rugby league season =

Seasons
- 1952 1954

The 1953 New Zealand rugby league season was the 46th season of rugby league that had been played in New Zealand.

== International competitions ==
New Zealand defeated Australia 2–1 in a Test series. New Zealand were coached by Jim Amos and included Des White, Jimmy Edwards, Ron McKay, Tommy Baxter, Bevin Hough, Bill Sorensen, captain Jimmy Haig, John Bond, George Davidson, Bill McLennan, Bob Neilson, Alister Atkinson, Frank Mulcare, Cyril Paskell, Vern Bakalich and Cyril Eastlake.

The Kangaroos recorded wins over the West Coast, 17–11, South Island 66–9 in Dunedin, Taranaki, 62–3, South Auckland 63–11 at Davies Park. They then defeated Auckland 26–4 at Carlaw Park. The Auckland side was Des White, Don Clapp, Tommy Baxter, Cyril Eastlake, Vern Bakalich, Bill Sorensen, captain Des Barchard, Jack Wright, George Davidson, Jack Meates, Henry Maxwell, Doug Richards-Jolley and Barry Singe. Australia finished the tour with a 98–7 victory over Northland.

The American All Stars arrived in the country after touring Australia. The squad had many injuries and so Des Barchard, Travers Hardwick, Frank Mulcare and Roy Roff joined the All Stars squad. Roy Moore and Dick Haggie also played in some matches. The All Stars lost to Auckland, 26–54, on 1 August before beating Taranaki, 21–18, on 5 August and Wellington 17–8 on 8 August. They then lost to the West Coast 10–27 on 11 August and Canterbury 8–39 on 15 August before beating North Auckland 26–5 on 19 August. They then lost to Auckland Māori, 23–40, on 22 August before finishing the tour with a win against South Auckland 22–19 on 24 August. The Auckland side was Des White, Jimmy Edwards, Tommy Baxter, Cyril Eastlake, Vern Bakalich, Bill Sorensen, Keith Graham, Henry Maxwell, George Davidson, Jack Meates, Jim Riddell, Doug Richards-Jolley and Bill Goulin.

Jack Redwood stepped down as the New Zealand Rugby League chairman, after serving since 1937.

== National competitions ==
=== Northern Union Cup ===
Auckland again held the Northern Union Cup at the end of the season.

=== Inter-island competition ===
The South Island defeated the North Island 23–20 on 2 June.

The South Island included Cyril Paskell, Jimmy Haig, Bill McLennan, John Bond, Bob Neilson, Frank Mulcare, Alister Atkinson, Jock Butterfield and Trevor Kilkelly.

=== Inter-district competition ===
The Meates Cup was presented by West Coast official Bill Meates for competition between the West Coast and Auckland. Auckland won the first contest 12–2 at Carlaw Park.

Canterbury defeated Otago 20–5 on 2 June as the curtain raiser to the South Island v North Island game.

Auckland included Vern Bakalich, Des White and Jimmy Edwards. Canterbury included Alister Atkinson, Jimmy Haig, Cyril Paskell, Lory Blanchard, John Bond, Jock Butterfield and Trevor Kilkelly.

== Club competitions ==
=== Auckland ===
Pt Chevalier won the Auckland Rugby League's Fox Memorial Trophy. Mt Albert won the Rukutai Shield, Ponsonby won the Roope Rooster and Richmond won the Sharman Cup.

=== Wellington ===
St George won the Wellington Rugby League's Appleton Shield.

=== Canterbury ===
Sydenham won the Canterbury Rugby League's Massetti Cup.

=== Other Competitions ===
Sydenham defeated Dunedin Combined 24–11 at Taranga Park during Easter Weekend.

Blackball defeated Sydenham 12–7 to win the Thacker Shield.
