= 1954 New Zealand rugby league season =

Seasons
- ← 1953 1955 →

The 1954 New Zealand rugby league season was the 47th season of rugby league that had been played in New Zealand.

== International competitions ==
New Zealand lost a Test series to Great Britain 1–2. New Zealand included; Des White, Cyril Eastlake, Ron McKay, Tommy Baxter, Jimmy Edwards, George Menzies, captain Jimmy Haig, Cliff Johnson, Roy Roff, Bill McLennan, John Bond, Frank Mulcare, Alister Atkinson, Ron Ackland, Vern Bakalich, Bill Sorensen, Lory Blanchard, Jock Butterfield and Jim Austin. Wingham Park hosted one of the matches, its only test to date. With a capacity of 4000 it became the smallest test venue in the world.

Auckland defeated Great Britain 5–4 at Carlaw Park while Canterbury lost 60–14 to the Lions and the South Island lost 11–32. The Auckland match was a rough match which resulted in Nat Silcock and Jack Wilkinson being sent off and a serious spleen injury to Des White from an illegal Doug Greenall tackle. Auckland included Des White, Jim Austin, Ron Ackland, Tommy Baxter, Jimmy Edwards, Cyril Eastlake, Len Eriksen, Joe Ratima, Roy Roff, Cliff Johnson, Doug Richards-Jolley, John Yates and Ian Grey. The South Island included Cliff Harris, Keith Roberts, Les McNicol, George Menzies, Jimmy Haig, Bill McLennan, Lory Blanchard, John Bond, Jock Butterfield, Frank Mulcare and Alister Atkinson.

The Kiwis then competed in the first ever World Cup, losing matches to Australia, Great Britain and France. The Kiwis toured the United States on their way back from the World Cup. New Zealand were coached by Jim Amos and included Doug Anderson, Jimmy Edwards, Neville Denton, Jim Austin, Ron McKay, captain Cyril Eastlake, Bill Sorensen, George Menzies, Len Eriksen, Lory Blanchard, John Bond, Cliff Johnson, Bill McLennan, Jock Butterfield, George McDonald, John Yates, vice-captain Alister Atkinson and Ian Grey. After the World Cup New Zealand played a Test match against Australia at Hilton Park in Wigan, losing 18–5. They then played two exhibition matches against Australia on the way home, in Los Angeles and Long Beach, California.

== National competitions ==
=== Northern Union Cup ===
Auckland again held the Northern Union Cup at the end of the season.

=== Inter-district competition ===
Auckland toured the South Island in June, defeating Canterbury 35-15 and the West Coast 30–14 at Wingham Park. It was the first time Auckland had defeated the West Coast at home since before World War Two.

Auckland included Cliff Johnson, Ron Ackland, Bill Sorensen, Ian Grey, Jim Austin, Des White and Cyril Eastlake. Canterbury included Alister Atkinson, Trevor Kilkelly, Jock Butterfield, John Bond, Mel Cooke, Cyril Paskell and Joe Curtain. The West Coast included George Menzies.

== Club competitions ==
=== Auckland ===
Ponsonby won the Auckland Rugby League's Fox Memorial Trophy. They also shared the Rukutai Shield with Mt Albert while North Shore won the Roope Rooster and Stormont Shield.

=== Wellington ===
Korodale won the Wellington Rugby League's Appleton Shield.

=== Canterbury ===
Sydenham won the Canterbury Rugby League's Massetti Cup.

Jock Butterfield played for Sydenham.
