= 1951 New Zealand rugby league season =

Seasons
- 1950 1952

The 1951 New Zealand rugby league season was the 44th season of rugby league that had been played in New Zealand.

== International competitions ==
New Zealand defeated France 16–15 in a "brutal match" at Carlaw Park. A "sensation" occurred after half time when referee Jim Grittin ordered French forward Martin Martin off the field for throwing mud at him. Martin had objected to a penalty being awarded against the French. Des White kicked the winning penalty goal after the full-time siren had sounded. The New Zealand side for the match was; Des White, Bevin Hough, Tommy Baxter, Maurie Robertson, Jack Forrest, George Menzies, captain Jimmy Haig, Ken English, George Davidson, Cliff Johnson, Doug Richards-Jolley, Charlie McBride and Travers Hardwick.

The Kiwis then toured Great Britain and France at the end of the season, recording a victory over Wales but losing 0–3 against Great Britain and 0–2 in France. New Zealand also lost a match against the British Empire 26–2 on 23 January 1952 that was designated a Test Match. New Zealand were coached by Thomas McClymont and included; Des White, Cyril Eastlake, Tommy Baxter, captain Maurie Robertson, Bevin Hough, George Menzies, Jimmy Haig, Cliff Johnson, George Davidson, Bill McLennan, Charlie McBride, Frank Mulcare, Alister Atkinson, Bruce Robertson, Jack Forrest, Des Barchard, Jimmy Edwards, Doug Richards-Jolley, Lory Blanchard, Andy Berryman and Bill Sorensen.

While in the country, France defeated Canterbury 13–7 in front of 13,000 at the Show Grounds. Two days after the one-off Test match France returned to Carlaw Park to play Auckland. France won 15–10 in front of 30,000 spectators. Auckland included Des White, Jimmy Edwards, Tommy Baxter, Cyril Eastlake, Bevin Hough, Bruce Robertson, captain Des Barchard, Cliff Johnson, George Davidson, Graham Burgoyne, Doug Richards-Jolley, Clarence Hurndell and Allan Wiles. France also defeated the West Coast, Wellington, South Auckland and Taranaki.

== National competitions ==
=== Northern Union Cup ===
Auckland again held the Northern Union Cup at the end of the season.

=== Inter-district competition ===
Canterbury included Alister Atkinson, captain Jimmy Haig, Lory Blanchard, John Bond, Cyril Paskell and Joe Curtain.

== Club competitions ==
=== Auckland ===
Richmond and Mt Albert shared the Auckland Rugby League's Fox Memorial Trophy and Rukutai Shield. Pt Chevalier won the Roope Rooster, Stormont Shield and Sharman Cup.

=== Wellington ===
Miramar won the Wellington Rugby League's Appleton Shield.

=== Canterbury ===
Linwood won the Canterbury Rugby League's Massetti Cup.

The Show Grounds were offered to the Canterbury Rugby League by the council on a five-year lease, starting a long-term relationship with the ground that continues to this day.

=== Other Competitions ===
Greymouth Marist defeated Linwood 24–9 to win the Thacker Shield.
