= 1952 New Zealand rugby league season =

Seasons
- ← 1951 1953 →

The 1952 New Zealand rugby league season was the 45th season of rugby league that had been played in New Zealand.

== International competitions ==
New Zealand toured Australia, winning the Test series 2-1. The Kiwis were coached by Jim Amos and included Des White, Harvey Kreyl, Bevin Hough, Jimmy Edwards, Ron McKay, Tommy Baxter, Bill McKenzie, Cyril Eastlake, Jimmy Haig, Lory Blanchard, George Davidson, Bill McLennan, Alister Atkinson, Frank Mulcare, captain Travers Hardwick and George Menzies.

White kicked a word Test record eleven goals when the Kiwis defeated Australia 49-25 at the Brisbane Cricket Ground.

== National competitions ==
=== Northern Union Cup ===
Auckland again held the Northern Union Cup at the end of the season. During the season the Wellington also held the trophy. Canterbury's challenge against Wellington ended in tragedy when 21-year-old Papanui winger Donald George Hanlon died from an injury.

=== Inter-district competition ===
Wellington defeated Canterbury twice during the season, winning 28-21 at the Show Grounds in Christchurch before winning 20-8 in Wellington in a Northern Union Cup challenge.

Canterbury included Joe Curtain, Jock Butterfield, John Bond, Trevor Kilkelly, Alister Atkinson and Lory Blanchard.

== Club competitions ==
=== Auckland ===
Ponsonby won the Auckland Rugby League's Fox Memorial Trophy. They completed "the treble" by also winning the Stormont Shield and Roope Rooster in the same season, as well as winning the Rukutai Shield. Pt Chevalier won the Sharman Cup.

Des White played for Ponsonby.

=== Wellington ===
Miramar won the Wellington Rugby League's Appleton Shield.

=== Canterbury ===
Hornby won the Canterbury Rugby League's Massetti Cup.

The Marist club was formed, although it had no connection with the Marist Old Boys club that had competed in the 1920s. The club was renamed Marist-Western Suburbs in 1968. In their first season they produced the Kiwi coach, Jim Amos, the Kiwi vice captain Jimmy Haig and another international Bill McKenzie.

Alister Atkinson and Lory Blanchard played for Linwood while Jock Butterfield played for Sydenham.

=== Other competitions ===
Hornby defeated Runanga 24-7 to win the Thacker Shield.
