= 1953 Kangaroo tour of New Zealand =

1953 rugby league tour

- Manager: Dudley F. Locke; George McLeod
- Coach(es): Clive Churchill
- Tour captain(s): Clive Churchill
- Top point scorer(s): Noel Pidding 63
- Top try scorer(s): Des McGovern 19
- Top test point scorer(s): Noel Pidding 13; Des White 24
- Top test try scorer(s): Ken McCaffery 2 Harry Wells 2 Ron McKay 3
Summary
P	W	D	L
Total
9	7	0	2
Test match
3	1	0	2
Opponent
P	W	D	L
New Zealand
3	1	0	2

Tour chronology
- Previous tour: 1949 to 1952 to 1952-53 to
- Next tour: 1956 to 1952-53 to 1961 to

The 1953 Kangaroo Tour of New Zealand was a mid-season tour of New Zealand by the Australia national rugby league team. The Australians played nine matches on tour, including three tests against the New Zealand national rugby league team. The tour began on 24 June and finished on 18 July.

== Leadership ==
Clive Churchill was both the captain and the coach of the touring side. He appeared in eight of the nine matches.
In the one game in which Churchill was absent, against Northland, Ken McCaffery captained the Australian team.
The team was managed by Dudley Locke of Wollongong and George McLeod of Maryborough.

== Touring squad ==
The Rugby League News published the touring team including the players' ages and weights. Match details - listing surnames of both teams and the point scorers - were included in E.E. Christensen's Official Rugby League Yearbook, as was a summary of the players' point-scoring.
Crocker, Davies, Drew, Hornery, Banks, McCaffery, McGovern and Watson were selected from Queensland clubs. Carlson, Gill and Paul were selected from clubs in New South Wales Country areas. The balance of the squad had played for Sydney based clubs during the 1953 season.

Player	Position	Age	Weight	Club	Tests on Tour	Games	Tries	Goals	FG	Points
Ferris Ashton	Second-row	26	14 st. 8 lb. (93 kg)	Eastern Suburbs	1	5	4	5	0	22
Roy Bull	Prop	23	14 st. 4 lb. (91 kg)	Manly-Warringah	3	6	2	0		6
Brian Carlson	Wing	20	13 st. 3 lb. (84 kg)	Newcastle Northern Suburbs	2	6	16	5		58
Clive Churchill	Fullback	26	11 st. 7 lb. (73 kg)	South Sydney	3	8	1	0	0	3
Les Cowie	Lock	28	13 st. 4 lb. (84 kg)	South Sydney	1	5	0	0	0	0
Harold Crocker	Lock	24	15 st. 0 lb. (95 kg)	South Brisbane	3	5	0	0	0	0
Brian Davies	Prop	22	15 st. 0 lb. (95 kg)	Brisbane Brothers	3	7	3	0	0	9
Bernie Drew	Second-row	24	13 st. 7 lb. (86 kg)	Ipswich Railways	1	5	9	2	0	31
Charlie Gill	Prop	30	13 st. 12 lb. (88 kg)	Newcastle Northern Suburbs	3	7	1	1	0	5
Greg Hawick	Five-eighth	21	13 st. 0 lb. (83 kg)	South Sydney	2	6	1	3	0	9
Keith Holman	Halfback	25	11 st. 9 lb. (74 kg)	Western Suburbs	1	4	2	2	0	10
Alan Hornery	Hooker	27	13 st. 6 lb. (85 kg)	Brisbane Western Suburbs	0	5	1	1	0	5
Ken Kearney	Hooker	27	14 st. 2 lb. (90 kg)	St George	3	4	0	0	0	0
Bob Banks	Five-eighth	22	12 st. 6 lb. (79 kg)	Toowoomba Newtown	3	7	4	2	0	16
Ken McCaffery	Centre	23	13 st. 0 lb. (83 kg)	Toowoomba Souths	3	6	8	0	0	24
Des McGovern	Wing	24	13 st. 4 lb. (84 kg)	Toowoomba Newtown	1	6	19	1	0	59
Albert Paul	Second-row	25	14 st. 2 lb. (90 kg)	Lakes United	0	5	1	1	0	5
Noel Pidding	Wing	26	12 st. 6 lb. (79 kg)	St George	3	8	9	18	0	63
Alex Watson	Centre	20	13 st. 4 lb. (84 kg)	Brisbane Western Suburbs	0	5	6	1	0	20
Harry Wells	Centre	21	14 st. 2 lb. (90 kg)	Wollongong	3	7	7	0	0	21

== Tour ==
The Australians played nine matches on the tour, winning seven matches and losing two, both being tests against the Kiwis.

Wednesday 24 June

West Coast	11 – 17	Australia
	Report

Wingham Park, Greymouth
Attendance: 2,003
Referee: Wally Wilkinson

=== First test ===
Saturday 27 June

New Zealand	25 – 5	Australia
Tries: Ron McKay (2); George Davidson; Jimmy Edwards; Des White Goals: Des White (4/4); John Bond (1/1)		Tries: Ferris Ashton; Goals: Noel Pidding (1/1)

Addington Showgrounds, Christchurch
Attendance: 5,509
Referee: Wally Wilkinson (New Zealand)

New Zealand	Position	Australia
Des White	FB	Clive Churchill (c)
Jimmy Edwards	WG	Brian Carlson
Ron McKay	CE	Harry Wells
Tommy Baxter	CE	Ken McCaffery
Bevin Hough	WG	Noel Pidding
Bill Sorensen	FE	Bob Banks
Jimmy Haig (c)	HB	Keith Holman
John Bond	PR	Roy Bull
George Davidson	HK	Ken Kearney
Bill McLennan	PR	Charlie Gill
Bob Neilson	SR	Brian Davies
Frank Mulcare	SR	Ferris Ashton
Alister Atkinson	LF	Harold Crocker
Jim Amos	Coach	Clive Churchill

Tuesday 30 June

South Island	9 – 66	Australia
	Report

University Oval, Dunedin
Attendance: 2,956

=== Second test ===
Saturday 4 July

New Zealand	12 – 11	Australia
Tries: Ron McKay; Bob Neilson; Goals: Des White (3/3)		Tries: Ken McCaffery; Brian Carlson; Goals: Noel Pidding (1/2)

Basin Reserve, Wellington
Attendance: 5,394
Referee: Wally Wilkinson (New Zealand)

New Zealand	Position	Australia
Des White	FB	Clive Churchill (c)
Cyril Paskell	WG	Brian Carlson
Ron McKay	CE	Harry Wells
Tommy Baxter	CE	Ken McCaffery
Jimmy Edwards	WG	Noel Pidding
Bill Sorensen	FE	Bob Banks
Jimmy Haig (c)	HB	Greg Hawick
Bill McLennan	PR	Roy Bull
George Davidson	HK	Ken Kearney
John Bond	PR	Charlie Gill
Bob Neilson	SR	Brian Davies
Frank Mulcare	SR	Harold Crocker
Alister Atkinson	LF	Les Cowie
Jim Amos	Coach	Clive Churchill

Monday 6 July

Taranaki	3 – 62	Australia
	Report

Pukekura Park, New Plymouth
Attendance: 1,950

Wednesday 8 July

South Auckland	11 – 63	Australia
	Report

Davies Park, Huntly
Attendance: 1,044

Saturday 11 July

Auckland	4 – 26	Australia
	Report

Carlaw Park, Auckland
Attendance: 8,556

Wednesday 15 July

Northland	7 – 98	Australia
	Report

Okara Park, Whangārei
Attendance: 1,051

=== Third test ===
Saturday 18 July

New Zealand	16 – 18	Australia
Tries: Jimmy Edwards; Frank Mulcare; Bob Neilson; Des White; Goals: Des White (2/4)		Tries: Harry Wells (2); Bob Banks; Noel Pidding; Goals: Noel Pidding (3/4)

Carlaw Park, Auckland
Attendance: 16,033
Referee: Roland Avery (New Zealand)

New Zealand	Position	Australia
Des White	FB	Clive Churchill (c)
Jimmy Edwards	WG	Des McGovern
Ron McKay	CE	Harry Wells
Tommy Baxter	CE	Ken McCaffery
Vern Bakalich	WG	Noel Pidding
Cyril Eastlake	FE	Bob Banks
Jimmy Haig (c)	HB	Greg Hawick
John Bond	PR	Roy Bull
George Davidson	HK	Ken Kearney
Bill McLennan	PR	Charlie Gill
Bob Neilson	SR	Brian Davies
Frank Mulcare	SR	Bernie Drew
Alister Atkinson	LF	Harold Crocker
Jim Amos	Coach	Clive Churchill
