= 1952 New Zealand rugby league tour of Australia =

- Manager: Bill Swift; Colin Siddle
- Coach(es): Jim Amos
- Tour captain(s): Travers Hardwick
- Top point scorer(s): Des White 107
- Top try scorer(s): Alister Atkinson 10
- Top test point scorer(s): Des White 36
- Top test try scorer(s): Alister Atkinson 3 Ron McKay 3 Col Geelan 3
Summary
P	W	D	L
Total
13	10	0	3
Test match
3	2	0	1
Opponent
P	W	D	L
Australia
3	2	0	1

Tour chronology
- Previous tour: 1948 by to 1951 by 1951-52 to
- Next tour: 1953 by 1953 by to 1955-56 to 1956 by to

The 1952 New Zealand rugby league tour of Australia was the sixteenth tour by New Zealand's national rugby league team, and the twelfth tour to visit Australia. The thirteen-match tour included three Test Matches.
Captained by Travers Hardwick and coached by Jim Amos, the Kiwis completed a successful tour, winning ten of the thirteen matches. The team recovered from losing the First Test Match, to win – in the space of five days – the Second and Third Tests and claim the series by a two-one margin.

== Squad ==
The team was coached by Les Amos and managed by Bill Swift and Colin Siddle. Travers Hardwick was captain in all three Test Matches and in each of the eight other tour matches in which he appeared. Tommy Baxter captained the side against Newcastle.

The Rugby League News published a Team Photo, Player Details (Occupation, Age, Height and Weight) and pen portraits of the tourists: Backs and Forwards which listed their club and provincial team.

Player	Pos.	Age	Weight	Club	Province	Tests on Tour	Tour Games	Tries	Goals	FG	Points
Alister Atkinson	Lock	25	13 st. 0 lb. (83 kg)	Linwood	Canterbury	3	9	10	0	0	30
Tommy Baxter	Centre	22	13 st. 8 lb. (86 kg)	Richmond	Auckland	3	10	4	0	0	12
David Blanchard	Prop	27	14 st. 0 lb. (89 kg)	Linwood	Canterbury	3	8	2	0	0	6
Bill Davidson	Hooker	26	13 st. 2 lb. (83 kg)	Marist Brothers	Auckland	3	8	2	3	0	12
Cyril Eastlake	Centre	21	11 st. 4 lb. (72 kg)	Ellerslie	Auckland	3	10	7	0	0	21
Robert Edwards	Wing	25	12 st. 0 lb. (76 kg)	Marist Brothers	Auckland	3	9	5	0	0	15
Jimmy Haig	Halfback	27	12 st. 3 lb. (78 kg)	Marist Brothers Old Boys	Canterbury	3	9	3	1	0	11
Travers Hardwick	Lock	29	13 st. 11 lb. (88 kg)	Ngaruawahia	South Auckland	3	11	4	0	0	12
Cliff Harris	Centre	21	13 st. 0 lb. (83 kg)	Marist Brothers	Auckland	0	2	0	0	0	0
Bevan Hough	Wing	23	11 st. 7 lb. (73 kg)	Richmond	Auckland	0	7	6	0	0	18
Harvey Kreyl	Second-row	26	14 st. 1 lb. (89 kg)	Randwick	Wellington	0	6	2	0	0	6
Ron McKay	Five-eighth	20	12 st. 7 lb. (79 kg)	Central	Taranaki	3	8	5	0	0	15
Bill McKenzie	Wing	27	13 st. 6 lb. (85 kg)	Marist Brothers Old Boys	Canterbury	1	5	0	0	0	0
Bill McLennan	Prop	24	16 st. 0 lb. (102 kg)	Blackball	West Coast	3	11	3	0	0	9
George Menzies	Five-eighth	21	11 st. 0 lb. (70 kg)	Runanga	West Coast	2	8	3	0	0	9
Roy Moore	Fullback	23	12 st. 12 lb. (82 kg)	Mount Albert	Auckland	0	4	0	20	0	40
Frank Mulcare	Second-row	23	12 st. 12 lb. (82 kg)	Ngahere	West Coast	3	9	8	0	0	24
Bob Neilson	Second-row	28	13 st. 12 lb. (88 kg)	Greymouth Marist	West Coast	0	5	1	0	0	3
Bob O'Donnell	Prop	26	15 st. 0 lb. (95 kg)	Blackball	West Coast	0	4	0	0	0	0
Joe Rātima	Second-row	26	15 st. 7 lb. (98 kg)	Ponsonby	Auckland	0	4	3	0	0	9
Alan Riechelmann	Centre	21	12 st. 10 lb. (81 kg)	Marist Brothers	Auckland	0	4	1	0	0	3
Roy Roff	Hooker	26	12 st. 4 lb. (78 kg)	Mount Albert	Auckland	0	5	2	0	0	6
Jack Russell-Green	Halfback	26	11 st. 5 lb. (72 kg)	Point Chevalier	Auckland	0	4	0	0	0	0
Des White	Fullback	25	12 st. 3 lb. (78 kg)	Ponsonby	Auckland	3	9	1	52	0	107

== Matches ==
May 28	Riverina-Western Division	5–22	New Zealand	Albert Park, Young
	Tries: 1 Neville (Fraser) Frazer; Goals: 1 Stan Root	Teams; Report	Tries: 4 Robert Edwards (2); Des White; Frank Mulcare; Goals: 5 Des White (5)	Attendance: 3,351; Referee: L. Boyton

Team list:

Combined Riverina-Western Division FB: Les Koch ( Gundagai), WG: Neil Kingsmill ( Albury Blues), CE: Neville Brogan ( Young), CE: Clem O'Brien (Geurie), WG: Stan Root ( Narromine), FE: J. Doherty ( Warren), HB: Bob Isaac ( Adelong), LK: Peter O'Connor ( Young), SR: Ted Curran ( Adelong), SR: Neville (Fraser) Frazer ( Dunedoo), PR: Eric Funnell ( Bathurst Railway), HK: Harry Gibbs ( Gundagai), PR: Frank Hogan ( St Patrick's), IJ: Tom Kerwick ( Orange CYMS), Coach: Nevyl Hand.
New Zealand FB: Des White, WG: Robert Edwards, CE: Tommy Baxter, CE: Cyril Eastlake, WG: Bill McKenzie, FE: George Menzies, HB: Jimmy Haig, LK: Travers Hardwick, SR: Harvey Kreyl, SR: Frank Mulcare, PR: Bob O'Donnell, HK: Bill Davidson, PR: Bill McLennan.

May 31	New South Wales	15–26	New Zealand	Sydney Cricket Ground
3pm	Tries: 3 Brian Carlson; Ferris Ashton; Wally O'Connell; Goals: 3 Noel Pidding (3)	Program; Report	Tries: 4 Bill Davidson; Alister Atkinson; Robert Edwards; Cyril Eastlake; Goals: 7 Des White (7)	Attendance: 49,442; Gate: AU£ 6,836; Referee: George Bishop

Team list:

New South Wales FB: Clive Churchill (25) ( Souths), WG: Noel Pidding (25) ( St George), CE: Col Geelan (24) ( Newtown), CE: Harry Wells (20) ( Wollongong), WG: Brian Carlson (19) ( Newcastle Northern Suburbs), FE: Wally O'Connell (29) ( Manly), HB: Keith Holman (24) ( Wests), LK: Peter Diversi (20) ( Norths), SR: Albert Paul (24) ( Lakes United), SR: Ferris Ashton (24) ( Easts), PR: Charlie Gill (29) ( Newcastle Northern Suburbs), HK: Kevin Schubert (24) ( Manly), PR: Ken Mogg (25) ( South Newcastle).
The following were selected as reserves but did not play: Ian Moir (20) ( Souths) and Tom Tyrrell (24) ( Balmain).
New Zealand FB: Des White, WG: Robert Edwards, CE: Cyril Eastlake, CE: Tommy Baxter, WG: Bill McKenzie, FE: Ron McKay, HB: Jimmy Haig, LK: Travers Hardwick, SR: Frank Mulcare, SR: Alister Atkinson, PR: Bill McLennan, HK: Bill Davidson, PR: David Blanchard.

June 4	Monaro-Southern Division	8–21	New Zealand	Goulburn
	Tries: 0 Goals: 4 Bruce Smith (4)	Teams; Report	Tries: 3 Ron McKay; Frank Mulcare; Alister Atkinson; Goals: 6 Des White (6)	Attendance: 1,802; Referee: L. Grew

Team list:

Combined Monaro-Southern Division FB: Bert Hewitt ( Corrimal), WG: Ron Roberts (24) ( Picton), CE: Doug McRitchie (28) ( Queanbeyan), CE: Harry Wells (20) ( Wollongong), WG: Peter Morton ( Queanbeyan), FE: Bernie (O'Keeffe) O'Keefe ( C.B.C.), HB: Noel Hill ( Thirroul), LK: Jack Quinn ( Gerringong), SR: Jack Perrin ( Queanbeyan), SR: Bruce Smith (25) ( Thirroul), PR: Billy Hodges ( Captain's Flat), HK: Bill Bolt ( C.B.C.), PR: Austin Lawler ( C.B.C.).
New Zealand Des White, Robert Edwards, Ron McKay, Cliff Harris, Bevan Hough, Cyril Eastlake, Jimmy Haig, Travers Hardwick, Frank Mulcare, Alister Atkinson, Bill McLennan, Bill Davidson, David Blanchard.

June 7	Newcastle	9–7	New Zealand	Newcastle Sports Ground
2.45pm	Tries: 1 Ivor (Woolfe) Wolfe; Goals: 3 Viv Madge (2); Darcy Russell	Teams; Report; Report	Tries: 1 Bevan Hough; Goals: 2 Roy Moore (2)	Attendance: 14,000; Gate: AU£ 2,042; Referee: O. Screen

Team list:

Newcastle FB: Gwyn Madge (26) ( Kurri), WG: Ivor (Woolfe) Wolfe ( Lakes United), CE: Viv Madge (30) ( Kurri), CE: Ned Andrews (30) ( Souths), WG: Darcy Russell (23) ( Waratah Mayfield), FE: Warren Foley (18) ( Waratah Mayfield), HB: Bobby Banks (22) ( Centrals), LK: Frank Mayo (22) ( Wests), SR: Tom Anderson (23) ( Norths), SR: Gordon Harley (29) ( Maitland), PR: Doug Hawke (23) ( Norths), HK: Bill Hilliard (23) ( Kurri), PR: George Lawler (24) ( Maitland).
The following were selected as reserves but did not play: Gus Shepherd ( Centrals).
New Zealand FB: Roy Moore, WG: Bevan Hough, CE: Tommy Baxter, CE: Alan Riechelmann, WG: Bill McKenzie, FE: George Menzies, HB: Jack Russell-Green, LK: Bob Neilson, SR: Joe Rātima, SR: Harvey Kreyl, PR: Bill McLennan, HK: Roy Roff, PR: Bob O'Donnell.

=== 1st Test ===
June 9
2pm

Australia	25–13	New Zealand
Tries: 5 Denis Flannery (2); Noel Pidding (2); Albert Paul; Goals: 5 Noel Pidding (5)	Program; Report	Tries: 3 Robert Edwards; Tommy Baxter; Alister Atkinson; Goals: 2 Des White (2)

Sydney Cricket Ground
Attendance: 56,376
Gate: AU£ 9,090
Referee: George Bishop

Team list:

Australia FB: Clive Churchill (25) ( South Sydney), WG: Noel Pidding (25) ( St George), CE: Noel Hazzard (27) (Bundaberg), CE: Rees Duncan (20) ( Kurri Kurri), WG: Denis Flannery (23) ( Ipswich Brothers), FE: Col Geelan (24) ( Newtown), HB: Keith Holman (24) ( Western Suburbs), LK: Albert Paul (24) ( Lakes United), SR: Brian Davies (21) ( Brisbane Brothers), SR: Ferris Ashton (24) ( Eastern Suburbs), PR: Charlie Gill (29) ( Newcastle Northern Suburbs), HK: Kevin Schubert (24) ( Manly-Warringah), PR: Jack Rooney (24) ( Toowoomba All Whites).
The following were selected as reserves but did not play: Col Donohoe (22) ( Eastern Suburbs), and Tom Tyrrell (24) ( Balmain).
The following were selected but withdrew owing to injury: Harold (Mick) Crocker ( South Brisbane), Duncan Hall ( Toowoomba Newtown), Kevin Hansen ( Western Suburbs).
New Zealand FB: Des White, WG: Robert Edwards, CE: Ron McKay, CE: Tommy Baxter, WG: Bill McKenzie, FE: Cyril Eastlake, HB: Jimmy Haig, LK: Travers Hardwick, SR: Frank Mulcare, SR: Alister Atkinson, PR: Bill McLennan, HK: Bill Davidson, PR: David Blanchard.

June 11	Northern NSW	12–55	New Zealand	Tamworth
	Tries: 2 Colin De Lore; Carl Keogh; Goals: 3 B. Hillier (2); Carl Keogh	Teams; Report; Report	Tries: 11; Alister Atkinson (3); Bevan Hough (2); Bill McLennan (2); David Blanchard; Travers Hardwick; Jimmy Haig; Tommy Baxter; Goals: 11; Des White (11)	Attendance: 4,732; Gate: AU£ 724; Referee: K. Hilton

Team list:

Northern NSW (Combined North Coast-Northern Division) FB: B. Hillier ( North Tamworth), WG: Tom Mills ( Singleton), CE: Norman Young ( West Tamworth), CE: Colin De Lore (Tuncurry), WG: Jim Daley (Bangalow), FE: Kevin (Haydon) Hayden (Kempsey CYM), HB: Carl Keogh ( Gunnedah), LK: A J. Edwards (Murwillumbah), SR: George Alaban (Macksville), SR: Kevin (McKiernan) McKeirnan (Kempsey CYM), PR: Noel Hall ( Grafton), HK: Alf Hardman ( Moree), PR: C. Schaeffer (Macksville).
New Zealand FB: Des White, WG: Bevan Hough, CE: Cyril Eastlake, CE: Tommy Baxter, WG: Alister Atkinson, FE: George Menzies, HB: Jimmy Haig, LK: Travers Hardwick, SR: Harvey Kreyl, SR: Bob Neilson, PR: David Blanchard, HK: Roy Roff, PR: Bill McLennan.

June 14	Queensland	5–20	New Zealand	Brisbane Cricket Ground
3pm	Tries: 1 Ron (Roy) Teys; Goals: 1 Nev Linde	Team; Report	Tries: 4 George Menzies (2); Jimmy Haig; David Blanchard; Goals: 4 Bill Davidson (3); Jimmy Haig	Attendance: 9,995; Referee: S.W. Chambers

Team list:

Queensland FB: Nev Linde (27) ( Tivoli), WG: Des McGovern (24) ( Toowoomba All Whites), CE: Noel Hazzard (27) (Bundaberg), CE: Eric Webster ( Souths), WG: Denis Flannery (23) ( Ipswich Brothers), FE: Bob Banks (21) ( Toowoomba Newtown), HB: Cyril Connell Jr (22) ( Toowoomba Newtown), LK: Ron (Roy) Teys ( Toowoomba Valleys), SR: Roy Greenwood (Tully), SR: Brian Davies (21) ( Brisbane Brothers), PR: Jack Rooney (26) ( Brisbane Brothers), HK: Ron Griffiths (26) ( Ipswich CYM), PR: Gordon Teys ( Toowoomba Valleys).
The following were selected but withdrew owing to injury: Rex McGlynn (Bundaberg), Duncan Hall (28) ( Toowoomba Newtown), Harold (Mick) Crocker (25) ( Souths).
New Zealand FB: Des White, WG: Robert Edwards, CE: Ron McKay, CE: Tommy Baxter, WG: Bevan Hough, FE: George Menzies, HB: Jimmy Haig, LK: Travers Hardwick, SR: Frank Mulcare, SR: Alister Atkinson, PR: Bill McLennan, HK: Bill Davidson, PR: David Blanchard.

June 15	Central Queensland	4–35	New Zealand	Murray Street Grounds, Rockhampton
	Tries: 0 Goals: 2 Norm Pope (2)	Team; Report	Tries: 7 Cyril Eastlake (3); Travers Hardwick (2); Roy Roff; Bevan Hough; Goals: 7 Roy Moore (7)	Attendance: 3,500; Gate: AU£ 612; Referee: E.Condon

Team list:

Central Queensland FB: Norm Pope (20) ( Railways), WG: Leo Jeffcoat ( Brothers), CE: D. Watkins ( Norths), CE: B. Ford ( Brothers), WG: J (Paten) Paton ( Railways), FE: D. White ( Norths), HB: Duncan Jackson ( Norths), LK: Peter Robinson ( Norths), SR: Tony Brown ( Brothers), SR: Noel Joyce ( Brothers), PR: F. Bryson ( Brothers), HK: Vince Hage ( Norths), PR: D. Casey ( Railways).
New Zealand FB: Roy Moore, WG: Robert Edwards, CE: Alan Riechelmann, CE: Tommy Baxter, WG: Bevan Hough, FE: Cyril Eastlake, HB: Jack Russell-Green, LK: Travers Hardwick, SR: Bob Neilson, SR: Joe Rātima, PR: Harvey Kreyl, HK: Roy Roff, PR: Bob O'Donnell.

June 18	Central West Queensland	7–66	New Zealand	Barcaldine Sports Ground
	Tries: 1 Leo Quigley; Goals: 2 Norm Elliott (2)	Report	Tries: 16; Frank Mulcare (3); Joe R?tima (3); Bevan Hough (2); Harvey Kreyl (2); Alister Atkinson (2); Bob Neilson; Roy Roff; Bill McLennan; Jimmy Haig; Goals: 9 Roy Moore (9)	Attendance: 2,400; Referee: Jack Ross

Team list:

Central West Queensland FB: Noel Webster ( Longreach), WG: Alan Deasy ( Longreach), CE: Mick Hauff ( Blackall), CE: Mick Irwin ( Blackall), WG: Bill (Chic) Buchester ( Blackall), FE: Leo Quigley ( Blackall), HB: Alf (Alby) O'Brien ( Winton), LK: George Lynn ( Winton), SR: Doug Davis ( Longreach), SR: Col Hauff ( Blackall), PR: Norm Elliott ( Winton), HK: Brian Jisberg ( Barcaldine), PR: Mick Turnbull ( Blackall).
New Zealand FB: Roy Moore, WG: Alister Atkinson, CE: Alan Riechelmann, CE: Cyril Eastlake, WG: Bevan Hough, FE: George Menzies, HB: Jimmy Haig, LK: Frank Mulcare, SR: Joe Rātima, SR: Bob Neilson, PR: Harvey Kreyl, HK: Roy Roff, PR: Bill McLennan.

June 22	North Queensland	10–25	New Zealand	Sports Reserve, Townsville
	Tries: 2 Dev Dines; Neville Wilson; Goals: 2 Dev Dines; Keith Geary	Report; Photo	Tries: 5 George Menzies; Tommy Baxter; Frank Mulcare; Travers Hardwick; Ron McKay; Goals: 5 Des White (5)	Attendance: 7,953; Gate: AU£ 1,763; Referee: W. Morrison

Team list:

North Queensland FB: Frank Gill ( Kangaroos), WG: A. Boundy ( Ivanhoes), CE: Frank Fahey (Ayr), CE: Dev Dines (Mareeba), WG: Norm Stokes (Ayr), FE: Neville Wilson (Charters Towers), HB: Ron O'Connell ( Brothers), LK: Trevor Whitehead (Herbert River), SR: Horrie Robertson (Herbert River), SR: Keith Geary (Souths), PR: E. Kratzman (Tully), HK: Kel O'Shea (18) (Ayr), PR: Ross Primrose (Mackay).
New Zealand FB: Des White, WG: Robert Edwards, CE: Tommy Baxter, CE: Ron McKay, WG: Bevan Hough, FE: George Menzies, HB: Jack Russell-Green, LK: Travers Hardwick, SR: Alister Atkinson, SR: Frank Mulcare, PR: Bill McLennan, HK: Bill Davidson, PR: David Blanchard.

June 25	Toowoomba	15–10	New Zealand	Toowoomba Athletic Oval
	Tries: 3 Athol Halpin (2); Bill Beardsworth; Goals: 3 Neil Teys (3)	Report	Tries: 2 Alan Riechelmann; Cyril Eastlake; Goals: 2 Roy Moore (2)	Attendance: 5,901; Gate: AU£ 1,125; Referee: V. Vercoe

Team list:

Toowoomba FB: Ken Cronin ( Valleys), WG: Sammy Hunter ( Souths), CE: Russell Brown ( Souths), CE: Athol Halpin ( All Whites), WG: Jim Allen ( All Whites), FE: Bob Banks ( Newtown), HB: Ken McCaffery ( Souths), LK: Ron (Roy) Teys ( Valleys), SR: Gordon Teys ( Valleys), SR: Bill Beardsworth ( Valleys), PR: Vince Soorley ( Newtown), HK: Kev Boshammer ( All Whites), PR: Neil Teys ( Valleys).
New Zealand FB: Roy Moore, WG: Bill McKenzie, CE: Cyril Eastlake, CE: Alan Riechelmann, WG: Cliff Harris, FE: Ron McKay, HB: Jack Russell-Green, LK: Travers Hardwick, SR: Joe Rātima, SR: Bob Neilson, PR: Bob O'Donnell, HK: Roy Roff, PR: Harvey Kreyl.

=== 2nd Test ===
June 28

Australia	25–49	New Zealand
Tries: 5 Col Geelan (3); Ferris Ashton; Keith Holman; Goals: 5 Noel Pidding (5)	Report; Database; Photo	Tries: 9 Alister Atkinson (2); Ron McKay (2); Tommy Baxter; Frank Mulcare; Cyril Eastlake; Bill Davidson; Robert Edwards; Goals: 11; Des White (11)

Brisbane Cricket Ground
Attendance: 29,243
Gate: AU£ 7,396
Referee: George Bishop

Team list:

Australia FB: Clive Churchill ( South Sydney), WG: Denis Flannery ( Ipswich Brothers), CE: Noel Hazzard (Bundaberg), CE: Gordon Willoughby ( Manly-Warringah), WG: Noel Pidding ( St George), FE: Col Geelan ( Newtown), HB: Keith Holman ( Western Suburbs), LK: Albert Paul ( Lakes United), SR: Ferris Ashton ( Eastern Suburbs), SR: Brian Davies ( Brisbane Brothers), PR: Charlie Gill ( Newcastle Northern Suburbs), HK: Kevin Schubert ( Manly-Warringah), PR: Kevin Hansen ( Western Suburbs).
New Zealand FB: Des White, WG: Cyril Eastlake, CE: Ron McKay, CE: Tommy Baxter, WG: Robert Edwards, FE: George Menzies, HB: Jimmy Haig, LK: Travers Hardwick, SR: Alister Atkinson, SR: Frank Mulcare, PR: David Blanchard, HK: Bill Davidson, PR: Bill McLennan.

=== 3rd Test ===
July 2
3.30pm

Australia	9–19	New Zealand
Tries: 1 Noel Hazzard; Goals: 3 Clive Churchill (3)	Program; Report; Database	Tries: 3 Frank Mulcare; Ron McKay; Cyril Eastlake; Goals: 5 Des White (5)

Sydney Cricket Ground
Attendance: 44,916
Gate: AU£ 7,799
Referee: George Bishop

Team list:

Australia FB: Clive Churchill (25) ( South Sydney), WG: Des McGovern (24) ( Toowoomba All Whites), CE: Rees Duncan (20) ( Kurri Kurri), CE: Noel Hazzard (27) (Bundaberg), WG: Jack Lumsden (22) ( Manly-Warringah), FE: Col Geelan (24) ( Newtown), HB: Col Donohoe (24) ( Eastern Suburbs), LK: Harold (Mick) Crocker (24) ( South Brisbane), SR: Albert Paul (24) ( Lakes United), SR: Tom Tyrrell (24) ( Balmain), PR: Charlie Gill (29) ( Newcastle Northern Suburbs), HK: Kevin Schubert (24) ( Manly-Warringah), PR: Jack Rooney (26) ( Toowoomba All Whites)
The following were selected as reserves but did not play: Tommy Ryan (22) ( St George), Roy Bull (22) ( Manly-Warringah).
New Zealand FB: Des White, WG: Cyril Eastlake, CE: Tommy Baxter, CE: Ron McKay, WG: Robert Edwards, FE: George Menzies, HB: Jimmy Haig, LK: Travers Hardwick, SR: Alister Atkinson, SR: Frank Mulcare, PR: Bill McLennan, HK: Bill Davidson, PR: David Blanchard.

== Sources ==
Acronym	Item	Years	Database App	Notes
Direct Online Access
RLN	Rugby League News	1920-1973	Trove	Match Program in Sydney, Team Lists, Team Photos, Articles
RLP	Rugby League Project	1907–present	RLP Website	Test Match teams & scorers.
Sun	The Sun (Sydney)	1910-1954	Trove	Match Reports, Articles.
DT	The Daily Telegraph (Sydney)	1931-1954	Trove	Match Reports, Articles.
CM	The Courier-Mail	1933-1954	Trove	Match Reports, Articles.
-	Various Australian Regional Newspapers	up to 1954	Trove	Match Reports, Given Names of Players
-	New Zealand Newspapers	up to 1950	Papers Past	Match Reports.
Offline Resources
EECYB	E.E. Christensen's Official Rugby League Year Book	1946-1978	Copies at State Library of NSW	Teams, Point Scorers, Report. 1953 Yearbook covers the 1952 tour.
QRLG	Queensland Rugby League Gazette	1950-1955	Copies at State Library of Qld	Program for matches in Brisbane. Collection is predominantly of representative matches.
RRLG	Rockhampton Rugby League Gazette	1951-1968	Copies at State Library of Qld	Program for matches in Rockhampton. Collection includes club as well as Rockhampton and Central Queensland representative matches.
-	Ipswich Versus International Teams	1913-1975	Copies at SLQ & NLA	Match Report, Given Names & Club of Ipswich Players
-	The Bulimba Cup Era	1925-1972	Copies at SLQ & NLA	Clubs of Ipswich, Toowoomba and Brisbane players. This book includes Bulimba Cup match reports and team lists.
-	A History of Mackay Rugby League	1919-2015	Author's Website	Given Names & Club of Mackay Players
-	More Than The Foley Shield	1908-2014	Author's Website	Match report, team photos. Given Names & Club of North Queensland Players
