= 1950 New Zealand rugby league season =

Seasons
- ← 1949 1951 →

The 1950 New Zealand rugby league season was the 43rd season of rugby league that had been played in New Zealand.

== International competitions ==
New Zealand defeated the touring Great Britain side 2–0 in a Test series, winning 16–10 in Christchurch and 20–13 at Carlaw Park. For both Test matches New Zealand included; Des White, Jack Forrest, Tommy Baxter, captain Maurie Robertson, Bevin Hough, Des Barchard, Jimmy Haig, Cliff Johnson, George Davidson, John Newton, Clarence Hurndell, Charlie McBride and Travers Hardwick.

Auckland lost to Great Britain 26–17 at Carlaw Park. Auckland included Des White, Jimmy Edwards, Tommy Baxter, Maurie Robertson, Bevin Hough, Des Barchard, Ossie Stewart, Don McLeod, George Davidson, Bill Spence, Jack Wright, Cliff Johnson and Doug Price.

== National competitions ==
=== Northern Union Cup ===
Auckland held the Northern Union Cup at the end of the season.

=== Inter-island competition ===
The South Island defeated the North Island 19–12 in the annual fixture. The South Island included Jack Forrest, George Menzies, Jimmy Haig, John Newton, Lory Blanchard, Bob O'Donnell, Joe Curtain, Charlie McBride, Bob Neilson and Alister Atkinson.

=== Inter-district competition ===
Wellington lost to Auckland 41–4 in Auckland.

Auckland sent a team on a tour of Wellington and the South Island and at the same time hosted South Auckland. The touring side defeated Wellington 13–10 on a Thursday, defeated Canterbury 17-8 two days later, before losing to the West Coast 8–5 on the Sunday. The touring squad included Jimmy Edwards, captain Des White, Roy Roff and Clarence Hurndell. Canterbury included Lory Blanchard, Alister Atkinson and his brother, Neville. The West Coast included Jack Forrest, Ray Nuttall and John Newton.

The other Auckland side defeated South Auckland 29–26 at Carlaw Park. This Auckland side included Bevin Hough, Tommy Baxter, Bill Sorensen, Doug Anderson, Cliff Johnson, captain Ray Cranch, Doug Richards-Jolley and Graham Burgoyne.

== Club competitions ==
=== Auckland ===
Mt Albert won the Auckland Rugby League's Fox Memorial Trophy, Rukutai Shield, Roope Rooster and Norton Cup. Marist won the Stormont Shield while Otahuhu won the Sharman Cup. City retained its first division status after defeating Zora and Ellerslie in a two-round play-off.

Bevin Hough played for Richmond while Mount Albert included Allan Wiles and Ray Cranch.

=== Wellington ===
Waterside won the Wellington Rugby League's Appleton Shield.

=== Canterbury ===
Sydenham won the Canterbury Rugby League's Massetti Cup.

=== Other Competitions ===
Blackball thrashed Sydenham 53–13 to win the Thacker Shield and also defeated Mount Albert 35–15. Blackball included Bob Aynsley, Bill McLennan and Bob O'Donnell.
