= List of New Zealand national rugby league team head coaches =

The following men have coached the New Zealand national rugby league team in international test competition.

In the early years no coaches were formally announced. Instead, a "co-manager", who was usually a former player, was named and was responsible for the on-field performances. Otherwise, captains were in charge while squads were on tour.

The first man to help coach the New Zealand side was Northern Union official Jack Smith, who helped the 1907-1908 New Zealand side learn the rules when they arrived in Great Britain.

Jim Rukutai is the youngest coach to coach the national side, while Stephen Kearney has won the most test matches as coach (23 as of 2015).

== List of coaches ==
No.	Name	Province	Debut	Final match	Won	Drew	Lost	Tours	World Cups
1	George A. Gillett	Auckland	1912	1912					
2	Jim Rukutai	Auckland	1921	1921				Australia 1921	
3	Charlie Pearce	Canterbury	1925	1925				Australia 1925	
4	Ernest Mair	Queensland	1926	1927				Britain 1926-7	
5	Thomas McClymont	Auckland	1928	1928				Britain 1928	
6	Arthur Hennessy	Sydney	1930	1930				Australia 1930	
7	Bill Kelly	Sydney	1932	1932					
	Thomas McClymont	Auckland	1938	1952				Australia 1938, Britain/France 1947-8, Britain/France 1951-2	
8	Jim Amos	Canterbury	1952	1954	5	0	7	Australia 1952	1954
9	Harold Tetley	Auckland	1955	1956	2	0	4	Britain/France 1955-6	
10	Bill Telford		1956	1957	8	3	17	Australia 1956	1957
11	Travers Hardwick	Auckland	1959	1960	4	0	4	Australia 1959	1960
12	Des White	Auckland	1961	1961	1	0	1		
	Bill Telford		1961	1963				Britain/France 1961, Australia 1963	
13	Maurie Robertson	Auckland	1964	1965	4	0	1		
	Bill Telford		1965	1965				Britain/France 1965	
14	Lory Blanchard	Canterbury	1966	1967	6	1	11	Australia 1967	
15	Des Barchard	Auckland	1968	1968	0	0	6		1968, 1972
	Lory Blanchard	Canterbury	1969	1969					
16	Morrie Church	Wellington	1970	1970	0	0	3		
	Lory Blanchard	Canterbury	1970	1972				Britain/France 1971, Australia 1972	1970
	Des Barchard	Auckland	1972	1972					1972
17	George Menzies	West Coast	1974	1975	3	2	6		1975
18	Ron Ackland	Auckland	1977	1978	2	0	5	Australia/PNG 1978	1977
19	Ces Mountford	Auckland	1979	1982	6	1	8	Britain/France 1980, Australia/PNG 1982	
20	Graham Lowe	Auckland	1983	1986	10	1	8	Britain/France 1985	
21	Tony Gordon	Bay of Plenty	1987	1989	7	0	6	Australia/PNG 1987, Britain/France 1989	1988
22	Bob Bailey	Auckland	1990	1991	6	0	5	PNG 1990, Australia 1991	
23	Howie Tamati	Wellington	1992	1993	4	1	6	Britain/France 1993	
24	Frank Endacott	Canterbury	1994	2000	22	2	11	PNG 1994, Australia 1995, Britain 1998	1995, 2000
25	Gary Freeman	Sydney	2001	2002	1	0	2	Britain/France 2002	
26	Daniel Anderson	Auckland	2003	2005	1	1	6	Britain 2004	
27	Brian McClennan	Auckland	2005	2007	5	0	7	Britain 2005	
28	Gary Kemble	Auckland	2007	2007	1	0	4	Britain 2007	
29	Stephen Kearney	Wellington	2008	2016	23	1	18	Britain/France 2009, Britain 2011, Britain 2015	2008, 2013
30	David Kidwell	Canterbury	2016	2017	3	1	6	Britain 2016	2017
31	Michael Maguire	Sydney	2018	2023	5	2	3	Britain 2018	
