= 1953 in sports =

1953 in sports describes the year's events in world sport.

== American football ==
- NFL Championship: the Detroit Lions won 17–16 over the Cleveland Browns at Briggs Stadium

== Association football ==
England

- First Division – Arsenal win the 1952–53 title.
- FA Cup – Blackpool beat Bolton Wanderers 4–3 in what is known as "The Matthews Final", although it is Stan Mortensen who scores a winning hat-trick for Blackpool.
- England lose 6–3 to Hungary at Wembley Stadium their first ever loss to a team from Continental Europe at home.

Scotland

- Coronation Cup (football) – Celtic beat Hibernian 2–0 at Hampden Park.

Spain

- La Liga won by Barcelona F.C.

Italy

- Serie A won by F.C. Internazionale Milano

West Germany

- German football championship won by 1. FC Kaiserslautern

France

- French Division 1 won by Stade de Reims

Portugal

- Primeira Liga won by Sporting C.P.

== Australian rules football ==
- Victorian Football League
  - 23 May: Fitzroy, against a brilliant Footscray defence, kick the lowest VFL/AFL score since 1899, 1.0 (6) to 10.6 (66). Fitzroy seemed doomed to the first 0.0 (0) score in VFL history until Allan Ruthven scored a goal with ten minutes to go.
  - 4 July: Geelong beats Collingwood’s previous record of 20 consecutive wins, beating North Melbourne 12.14 (86) to 13.7 (85).
  - 1 August: Collingwood ends a run of 26 unbeaten games (including a draw with Essendon) by Geelong, beating them 10.15 (75) to 7.13 (55)
  - 26 September: Collingwood wins the 57th VFL Premiership, beating Geelong 11.11 (77) to 8.17 (65)
  - Brownlow Medal awarded to Bill Hutchison (Essendon)
- South Australian National Football League:
  - 3 October: West Torrens wins the last of its four SANFL premierships, beating Port Adelaide 9.13 (67) to 8.12 (60)
  - Magarey Medal won by Jim Deane (South Adelaide)
- Western Australian National Football League:
  - 8 August: Bernie Naylor kicks a WANFL record 23 goals against Subiaco, including twelve in one quarter.
  - 10 October: South Fremantle win their second consecutive premiership and seventh overall, beating West Perth 18.12 (120) to 8.13 (61)
  - Sandover Medal awarded to Merv McIntosh (Perth)

== Baseball ==
- World Series – New York Yankees won 4 games to 2 over the Brooklyn Dodgers
- The Boston Braves of the National League moved to Milwaukee, becoming the first MLB franchise to relocate in 50 years.

== Basketball ==
- NCAA Men's Basketball Championship –
  - Indiana wins 69–68 over Kansas
- NBA Finals –
  - Minneapolis Lakers won 4 games to 1 over the New York Knicks
- The eighth European basketball championship, Eurobasket 1953, is won by the Soviet Union.
- The fifteenth South American Basketball Championship in Montevideo is won by Uruguay.

== Boxing ==
- September 24 in New York City – Rocky Marciano retains his World Heavyweight title with a TKO over Roland La Starza in the 11th round.
- October in New York City – Bobo Olson scored a 15-round decision over Randy Turpin to win the World Middleweight Championship

== Bowling ==
Nine-pin bowling

- Nine-pin bowling World Championships –
  - Men's champion: Alfred Beierl, Austria
  - Women's champion: Jelena Šincek, Yugoslavia
  - Men's team champion: Yugoslavia
  - Women's team champion: Austria

== Canadian football ==
- Grey Cup – Hamilton Tiger-Cats win 12–6 over the Winnipeg Blue Bombers

== Cricket ==
England

- County Championship – Surrey
- Minor Counties Championship – Berkshire
- Most runs – Bill Edrich 2557 @ 47.35 (HS 211)
- Most wickets – Bruce Dooland 172 @ 16.58 (BB 7–19)
- Wisden Cricketers of the Year – Keith Miller, Neil Harvey, Johnny Wardle, Willie Watson, Tony Lock

Australia

- Sheffield Shield – South Australia
- Most runs – Neil Harvey 1659 @ 63.80 (HS 205)
- Most wickets – Hugh Tayfield 70 @ 27.91 (BB 7–71)
- South Africa make their first tour of Australia since 1931–32, and tie the five-Test series two-all with one draw

India

- Ranji Trophy – Holkar

New Zealand

- Plunket Shield – Otago
- Following their Australian tour, South Africa tour New Zealand, winning a two-Test series one-nil with one draw

South Africa

- Currie Cup – not contested

West Indies

- India make their first tour of the West Indies, losing a five-test series 0–1 with four draws.

== Cycling ==
- Giro d'Italia won by Fausto Coppi of Italy
- Tour de France – Louison Bobet of France
- UCI Road World Championships – Men's road race – Fausto Coppi of Italy

== Figure skating ==
- World Figure Skating Championships –
  - Men's champion: Hayes Alan Jenkins, United States
  - Ladies’ champion: Tenley Albright, United States
  - Pair skating champions: Jennifer Nicks & John Nicks, Great Britain
  - Ice dancing champions: Jean Westwood & Lawrence Demmy, Great Britain

== Golf ==
Men's professional

- Masters Tournament – Ben Hogan
- U.S. Open – Ben Hogan
- PGA Championship – Walter Burkemo
- British Open – Ben Hogan
- PGA Tour money leader – Lew Worsham – $34,002
- Ryder Cup – United States wins 6½ to 5½ over the British team.

Men's amateur

- British Amateur – Joe Carr
- U.S. Amateur – Gene Littler

Women's professional

- Women's Western Open – Louise Suggs
- U.S. Women's Open – Betsy Rawls
- Titleholders Championship – Patty Berg
- LPGA Tour money leader – Louise Suggs – $19,816

== Harness racing ==
- Little Brown Jug for pacers won by Keystoner
- Hambletonian for trotters won by Helicopter
- Australian Inter Dominion Harness Racing Championship –
  - Pacers: Captain Sandy

== Horse racing ==
Steeplechases

- Cheltenham Gold Cup – Knock Hard
- Grand National – Early Mist

Hurdle races

- Champion Hurdle – Sir Ken

Flat races

- Australia – Melbourne Cup won by Wodalla
- Canada – Queen's Plate won by Canadiana
- France – Prix de l'Arc de Triomphe won by La Sorellina
- Ireland – Irish Derby Stakes won by Chamier
- English Triple Crown Races:
  1. 2,000 Guineas Stakes – Nearula
  2. The Derby – Pinza
  3. St. Leger Stakes – Premonition
- United States Triple Crown Races:
  1. Kentucky Derby – Dark Star
  2. Preakness Stakes – Native Dancer
  3. Belmont Stakes – Native Dancer

== Ice hockey ==
- World Hockey Championship
  - Men's champion: Sweden defeated West Germany and Switzerland.
  - Canada did not participate in the World Hockey Championship, the government claiming it was not worth the expense.
- Stanley Cup – Montreal Canadiens win 4 games to 1 over the Boston Bruins
- Art Ross Trophy as the NHL's leading scorer during the regular season: Gordie Howe, Detroit Red Wings
- Hart Memorial Trophy for the NHL's Most Valuable Player: Gordie Howe, Detroit Red Wings
- NCAA Men's Ice Hockey Championship – University of Michigan Wolverines defeat University of Minnesota Golden Gophers 7–3 in Colorado Springs, CO
- HC Kometa Brno was founded in South Moravian Region, Czechoslovakia, present day of Czech Republic.

== Rugby league ==
- 1952–53 Kangaroo tour of Great Britain and France
- 1952–53 European Rugby League Championship / 1953–54 European Rugby League Championship
- 1953 Kangaroo tour of New Zealand
- 1953 New Zealand rugby league season
- 1953 NSWRFL season
- 1952–53 Northern Rugby Football League season / 1953–54 Northern Rugby Football League season

== Rugby union ==
- 59th Five Nations Championship series is won by England

== Snooker ==
- World Snooker Championship – Fred Davis beats Walter Donaldson 37–34

== Tennis ==
Australia

- Australian Men's Singles Championship – Ken Rosewall (Australia) defeats Mervyn Rose (Australia) 6–0, 6–3, 6–4
- Australian Women's Singles Championship – Maureen Connolly Brinker (USA) defeats Julia Sampson Hayward (USA) 6–3, 6–2

England

- Wimbledon Men's Singles Championship – Vic Seixas (USA) defeats Kurt Nielsen (Denmark) 9–7, 6–3, 6–4
- Wimbledon Women's Singles Championship – Maureen Connolly Brinker (USA) defeats Doris Hart (USA) 8–6, 7–5

France

- French Men's Singles Championship – Ken Rosewall (Australia) defeats Vic Seixas (USA) 6–3, 6–4, 1–6, 6–2
- French Women's Singles Championship – Maureen Connolly (USA) defeats Doris Hart (USA) 6–2, 6–4

USA

- American Men's Singles Championship – Tony Trabert (USA) defeats Vic Seixas (USA) 6–3, 6–2, 6–3
- American Women's Singles Championship – Maureen Connolly (USA) defeats Doris Hart (USA) 6–2, 6–4

Events

- Maureen Connolly becomes the first woman to win the Grand Slam in tennis.

Davis Cup

- 1953 Davis Cup – Australia 3–2 United States at Kooyong Stadium (grass) Melbourne, Australia

== Multi-sport events ==
- Pan Arab Games held in Alexandria, Egypt

== Awards ==
- Associated Press Male Athlete of the Year – Ben Hogan, PGA golf
- Associated Press Female Athlete of the Year – Maureen Connolly, Tennis
