= New Zealand Rugby League =

Sport governing body

- Founded: 1910; 116 years ago
- IRL affiliation: 1948
- APRL affiliation: 2010 (full; founder)
- Responsibility: New Zealand
- Headquarters: Rugby League House, 7 Beasley Avenue, Penrose, Auckland
- Key people: Justin Leydesdorff (Chair); Greg Peters (Chief Executive)
- Men's coach: Stacey Jones
- Women's coach: Ricky Henry
- Competitions: National Competition
- Website: nzrl.co.nz

(New Zealand)
- As of 21 Jan 2021

The New Zealand Rugby League (NZRL) is the governing body for the sport of rugby league football in New Zealand. The NZRL was founded on 25 April 1910 in preparation for a tour of Great Britain that same year.

The NZRL administers the New Zealand Kiwis and the New Zealand Kiwi Ferns. Currently they manage the NZRL National Secondary Schools Tournament, the NZRL National Youth Tournament, the NZRL National 9s, the NZRL National Women's Competition and the NZRL National Men's Competition. The premier competition is known as the National Premiership and the National Championship, which is a tier below. Previously, there was also a National 20's Competition launched in 2021 as a new pathway for developing elite talent. They are also responsible for elite pathway programmes including the NZ 16s and NZ 18s teams, the NZ Taurahere and the Junior Kiwis. They have previously managed the now defunct Lion Red Cup and Bartercard Cup competitions.

The NZRL is an incorporated society under the Incorporated Societies Act 1908. The current patron of the NZRL is Sir Anand Satyanand, who replaced Sir Peter Leitch in the role in 2019.

== History ==
In April 1910, the New Zealand Rugby League was formed for the purpose of administering the new code in New Zealand and "with the blessing of the Northern Rugby Football Union, on the condition that the Auckland District would not have the management of the entire game in New Zealand".

== Staff ==
Board

- Tawera Nikau (President)
- Justin Lydesdorff (chairman)
- Honey Hireme-Smiler
- Hugh Martyn
- John Devonshire
- Grant Stapleton
- Robyn Morete
- Ian Olán
- Nevak Rogers

Staff

- CEO: Greg Peters
- President: Tawera Nikau

== National Competition ==
The National Competition (previously called the National Zonal Competition) is the top-level rugby league competition run by the New Zealand Rugby League. In 2010 the competition replaced the Bartercard Premiership following a Sparc funded review and restructure of the New Zealand Rugby League. Since 2019, the competition has consisted of a four-team national premiership and an eight-team national championship (split into North and South Island Conferences) with a promotion and relegation between the two divisions.

== Zones ==
Throughout New Zealand, the sport is administered by seven zones and fifteen districts and has seven Affiliates.

Zones

- Northland
  (Northern Swords)
- Akarana
  (Akarana Falcons)
- Counties Manukau
  (Counties Manukau Stingrays)
- Upper Central
  (Wai-Coa-Bay Stallions)
- Mid Central
  (Central Vipers)
- Wellington
  (Wellington Orcas)
- Southern
  (Canterbury Bulls)

Districts

- Auckland Rugby League
- Aoraki Rugby League
- Bay of Plenty Rugby League
- Canterbury Rugby League
- Coastline Rugby League
- Gisborne Tairawhiti Rugby League
- Manawatu Rugby League
- Otago Rugby League
- Southland Rugby League
- Rugby League Hawke's Bay
- Taranaki Rugby League
- Tasman Rugby League
- Waikato Rugby League
- Wellington Rugby League
- West Coast Rugby League
- Whangarei City & Districts

Affiliates

- Kiwis Association
- Masters of Rugby League
- Defence Forces
- Māori Rugby League
- Universities and Tertiary Students
- Women's Rugby League
- Pacific Island Rugby League

== Legends of League ==
47 players have been inducted since the Legends of League was introduced in 1995.

1995 Inductees

- Ron Ackland
- Bert Avery
- Roger Bailey
- Tom Baxter
- Mel Cooke
- Cyril Eastlake
- Mark Graham
- Cliff Johnson
- Hugh McGahan
- George Menzies
- John Percival
- Kevin Tamati
- Des White
- Dennis Williams

2000 Inductees

- Dean Bell
- Lory Blanchard
- Travers Hardwick
- Karl Ifwersen
- Charlie McBride
- Bill McLennan
- Cecil Mountford
- Maurie Robertson
- Bill Sorensen
- Kurt Sorensen

2001 Inductees

- Albert Baskerville
- Jock Butterfield
- Phillip Orchard
- Charlie Seeling

2007 Inductees

- Roy Christian
- Tony Coll
- Olsen Filipaina
- Gary Freeman
- Scotty McClymont
- Ron McGregor
- Frank Mulcare
- Pat Smith
- Ken Stirling
- Lance Todd

2008 Inductees

- Albert Asher
- Tawera Nikau
- Jim Rukutai
- Puti Tipene (Steve) Watene

2010 Inductees

- Don Hammond
- Tom Hadfield

2012 Inductees (Wellington centenary)

- Stephen Kearney
- Colin O'Neil
- John Whittaker

2013 Inductees (Canterbury centenary)

- Jimmy Haig
- Alister Atkinson
- Mocky Brereton
- Mark Broadhurst

== See also ==
- Rugby League in New Zealand
- New Zealand national rugby league team
- Bartercard Cup
