= List of Australia national rugby league team records =

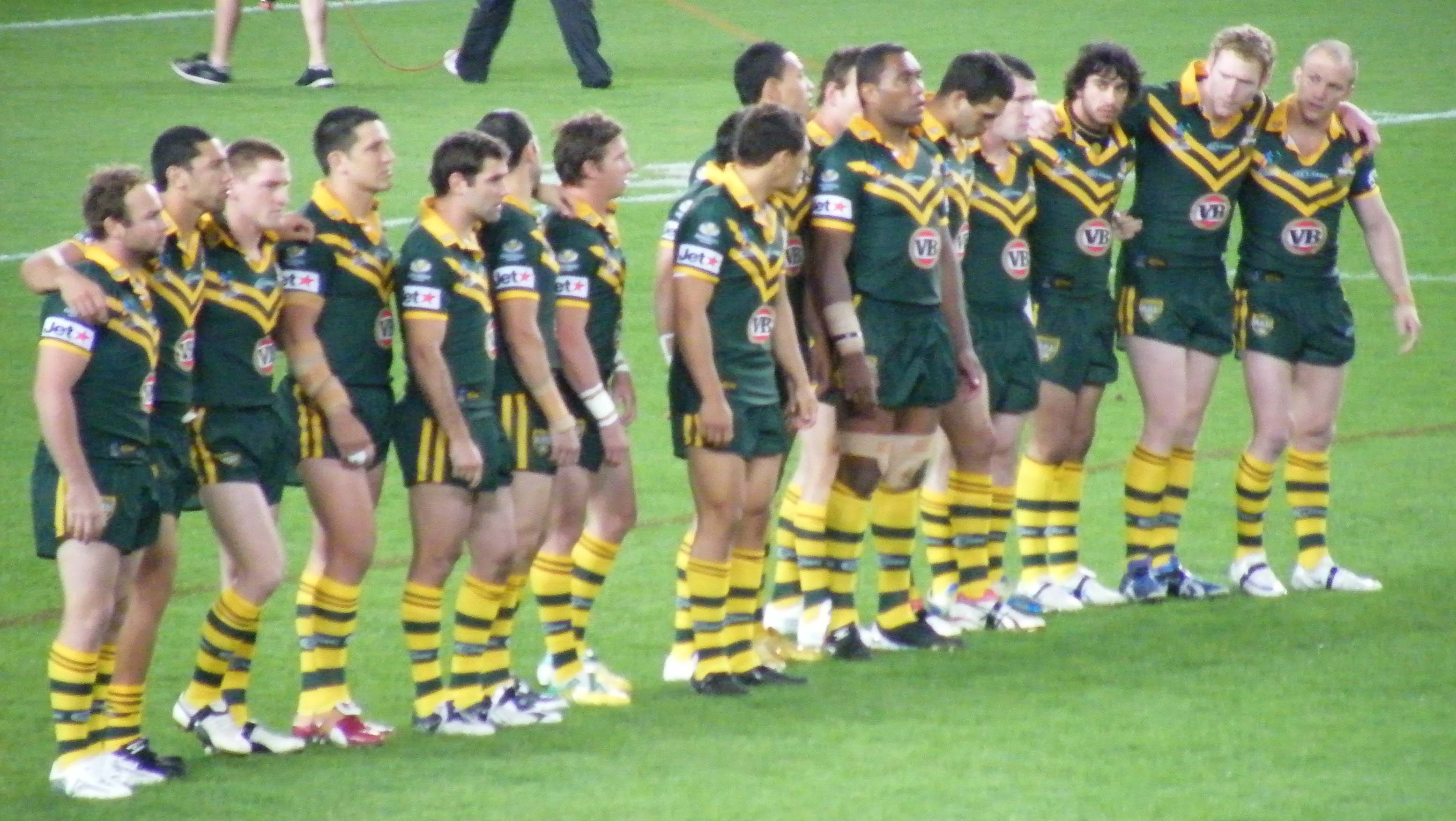
The Australia national rugby league team lining up before a match

Australia have competed in international rugby league matches since 1908. They have appeared at every Rugby League World Cup, winning the tournament eleven times. The records listed below only include performances in test matches and internationals. The top five are listed in each category (except when there is a tie for the last place among the five, when all the tied record holders are noted).

== Team records ==
=== Biggest wins ===
Margin (score)	Opposing team	Venue	Tournament
106 (110–4)	Russia	The Boulevard, Hull	2000 Rugby League World Cup
84 (84–0)	Scotland	Coventry Arena, Coventry	2021 Rugby League World Cup
82 (82–0)	Papua New Guinea	Willows Sports Complex, Townsville	2000 – Test match
80 (86–6)	South Africa	Gateshead International Stadium, Gateshead	1995 Rugby League World Cup
74 (74–0)	France	Stade de la Méditerranée, Béziers	1994 France vs Australia – Test match
70 (84–14)	Fiji	Newcastle International Sports Centre, Newcastle	1996 – International

=== Biggest losses ===
Margin (score)	Opposing team	Venue	Tournament
30 (0–30)	New Zealand	FMG Stadium Waikato, Hamilton	2023 Rugby League Pacific Championships Final
24 (25–49)	New Zealand	The Gabba, Brisbane	1952 Trans-Tasman series – 2nd Test
24 (0–24)	New Zealand	Elland Road, Leeds	2005 Rugby League Tri-Nations Final
23 (17–40)	Great Britain	Sydney Cricket Ground, Sydney	1958 Ashes series – 3rd Test
23 (10–33)	Great Britain	Princes Park, Melbourne	1992 Ashes series – 2nd Test
21 (14–35)	France	Sydney Cricket Ground, Sydney	1951 Australia vs France – 3rd Test
21 (3–24)	New Zealand	Carlaw Park, Auckland	1971 Trans-Tasman Test

=== Highest aggregate scores ===
Aggregate (score)	Opposing team	Venue	Tournament
114 (110–4)	Russia	The Boulevard, Hull	2000 Rugby League World Cup
98 (84–14)	Fiji	Newcastle International Sports Centre, Newcastle	1996 – International
92 (86–6)	South Africa	Gateshead International Stadium, Gateshead	1995 Rugby League World Cup
84 (84–0)	Scotland	Coventry Arena, Coventry	2021 Rugby League World Cup
82 (82–0)	Papua New Guinea	Willows Sports Complex, Townsville	2000 – Test match
74 (74–0)	France	Stade de la Méditerranée, Béziers	1994 France vs Australia – Test match
74 (64–10)	Great Britain	Sydney Football Stadium, Sydney	2002 – Test match
74 (62–12)	Papua New Guinea	Lloyd Robson Oval, Port Moresby	1985–1988 Rugby League World Cup

=== Lowest aggregate scores ===
Aggregate (score)	Opposing team	Venue	Tournament
0 (0–0)	England	Station Road, Swinton	1929–30 Ashes series – 3rd Test
3 (0–3)	England	Athletic Grounds, Rochdale	1929–30 Ashes series – 4th Test
4 (0–4)	England	Belle Vue, Manchester	1933 Ashes series – 1st Test
5 (0–5)	France	Stade Municipal, Bordeaux	1952–53 France vs Australia series – 2nd Test
6 (0–6)	England	The Willows, Salford	1921–22 Ashes series – 3rd Test
6 (6–0)	England	Lang Park, Brisbane	2017 Rugby League World Cup Final

== Individual records ==
=== Most appearances ===
Caps	Name	Career
59	Darren Lockyer	1998–2011
56	Cameron Smith	2006–2017
46	Mal Meninga	1982–1994
45	Graeme Langlands	1963–1975
45	Petero Civoniceva	2001–2011

=== Most appearances as captain ===
Caps	Name	Career
38	Darren Lockyer	1998–2025
33	Cameron Smith	2006–2017
27	Clive Churchill	1948–1956
25	Brad Fittler	1991–1995, 1998–2001
24	Wally Lewis	1981–1989, 1991

=== Most points ===
Tries	Goals	Field goals	Points	Name	Career
13	165	0	382	Johnathan Thurston	2006–2017
10	139	0	308	Mick Cronin	1973–1982
21	99	0	278	Mal Meninga	1982–1994
12	89	0	226	Andrew Johns	1995–2006
20	73	0	206	Graeme Langlands	1963–1975

=== Most tries ===
Tries	Name	Career
35	Darren Lockyer	1998–2011
33	Ken Irvine	1959–1967
31	Greg Inglis	2006–2016
28	Reg Gasnier	1959–1967
27	Billy Slater	2008–2014, 2017

=== Most goals ===
Points	Name	Career
165	Johnathan Thurston	2006–2017
139	Mick Cronin	1973–1982
99	Mal Meninga	1982–1994
89	Andrew Johns	1995–2006
73	Graeme Langlands	1963–1975

=== Most points in a game ===
Tries	Goals	Field goals	Points	Name	Opposing team	Venue	Tournament
3	17	0	46	Ryan Girdler	Russia	The Boulevard, Hull	2000 Rugby League World Cup
4	9	0	34	Mat Rogers	Fiji	Gateshead International Stadium, Gateshead	2000 Rugby League World Cup
2	12	0	32	Andrew Johns	Fiji	Newcastle International Sports Centre, Newcastle	1996 – International
4	7	0	30	Michael O'Connor	Papua New Guinea	Eric Weissel Oval, Wagga Wagga	1985–1988 Rugby League World Cup
2	11	0	30	Andrew Johns	South Africa	Gateshead International Stadium, Gateshead	1995 Rugby League World Cup

=== Most tries in a game ===
Goals	Name	Opposing team	Venue	Tournament
6	Valentine Holmes	Fiji	Lang Park, Brisbane	2017 Rugby League World Cup
5	Valentine Holmes	Samoa	Marrara Oval, Darwin	2017 Rugby League World Cup
5	Josh Addo-Carr	Scotland	Coventry Arena, Coventry	2021 Rugby League World Cup
4	John Ribot	Papua New Guinea	Lloyd Robson Oval, Port Moresby	1982 – International
4	Dale Shearer	France	Stade Albert Domec, Carcassonne	1985–1988 Rugby League World Cup
4	Michael O'Connor	Papua New Guinea	Eric Weissel Oval, Wagga Wagga	1985–1988 Rugby League World Cup
4	Brett Dallas	Fiji	Newcastle International Sports Centre, Newcastle	1996 – International
4	Gorden Tallis	Papua New Guinea	Willows Sports Complex, Townsville	2000 – Test match
4	Mat Rogers	Fiji	Gateshead International Stadium, Gateshead	2000 Rugby League World Cup
4	Wendell Sailor	Russia	The Boulevard, Hull	2000 Rugby League World Cup
4	Brett Morris	United States	Racecourse Ground, Wrexham	2013 Rugby League World Cup
4	Jarryd Hayne	United States	Racecourse Ground, Wrexham	2013 Rugby League World Cup
4	Wade Graham	France	Canberra Stadium	2017 Rugby League World Cup

=== Most goals in a game ===
Goals	Name	Opposing team	Venue	Tournament
17	Ryan Girdler	Russia	The Boulevard, Hull	2000 Rugby League World Cup
13	Mat Rogers	Papua New Guinea	Willows Sports Complex, Townsville	2000 – Test match
12	Andrew Johns	Fiji	Newcastle International Sports Centre, Newcastle	1996 – International
12	Nathan Cleary	Scotland	Coventry Arena, Coventry	2021 Rugby League World Cup
11	Rod Wishart	France	Stade de la Méditerranée, Béziers	1994 France vs Australia – Test match
11	Andrew Johns	South Africa	Gateshead International Stadium, Gateshead	1995 Rugby League World Cup

=== Oldest players ===
Age	Name	Opposing team	Venue	Tournament
38 years, 158 days	Sandy Pearce	England	The Boulevard, Hull	1921–22 Ashes series – 2nd Test
36 years, 23 days	Billy Wilson	New Zealand	Lang Park, Brisbane	1963 Trans-Tasman series – 2nd Test
35 years, 57 days	Steve Price	New Zealand	Lang Park, Brisbane	2009 Anzac Test
35 years, 15 days	Petero Civoniceva	New Zealand	Newcastle International Sports Centre, Newcastle	2011 Anzac Test
34 years, 349 days	Darren Smith	Great Britain	Kirklees Stadium, Huddersfield	2003 Ashes series – 3rd Test

=== Youngest players ===
Age	Name	Opposing team	Venue	Tournament
18 years, 129 days	Sione Mata'utia	England	Melbourne Rectangular Stadium, Melbourne	2014 Rugby League Four Nations
18 years, 194 days	Israel Folau	New Zealand	Lang Park, Brisbane	2007 Anzac Test
18 years, 301 days	Charles Fraser	England	St James' Park, Newcastle	1911–12 Ashes series – 1st Test
18 years, 316 days	Kerry Boustead	New Zealand	Sydney Cricket Ground, Sydney	1978 Trans-Tasman series – 1st Test
19 years, 5 days	Dugald McGregor	New Zealand	Brisbane Exhibition Ground, Brisbane	1909 Trans-Tasman series – 2nd Test
19 years, 240 days	Jeremiah Nanai	Fiji	Headingley, Leeds	2021 Rugby League World Cup

== Attendance records ==
=== Highest attendances in Australia ===
Attendance	Opposing team	Venue	Tournament
70,204	(United Kingdom) England*	Sydney Cricket Ground, Sydney	1932 Ashes series – 1st Test
70,174	Great Britain	Sydney Cricket Ground, Sydney	1962 Ashes series – 1st Test
68,777	Great Britain	Sydney Cricket Ground, Sydney	1958 Ashes series – 1st Test
68,720	Great Britain	Sydney Cricket Ground, Sydney	1958 Ashes series – 3rd Test
67,748	France	Sydney Cricket Ground, Sydney	1955 Australia vs France – 1st Test

* Great Britain played as England in the 1932 Ashes.

=== Highest attendances per opponent in Australia ===
Attendance	Opposing team	Venue	Tournament
70,204	(United Kingdom) England*	Sydney Cricket Ground, Sydney	1932 Ashes series – 1st Test
67,748	France	Sydney Cricket Ground, Sydney	1955 Australia vs France – 1st Test
56,326	New Zealand	Sydney Cricket Ground, Sydney	1952 Trans-Tasman series - 1st Test
41,529	Samoa	Sydney Football Stadium, Sydney	2026 Rugby League World Cup
41,108	Fiji	Lang Park, Brisbane	2026 Rugby League World Cup
40,033	England	Lang Park, Brisbane	2017 Rugby League World Cup Final
33,196	Tonga	Lang Park, Brisbane	2024 Pacific Championships
25,386	Wales	Sydney Cricket Ground, Sydney	1975 Rugby League World Cup
21,127	Lebanon	Sydney Football Stadium, Sydney	2017 Rugby League World Cup
21,000	Papua New Guinea	Willows Sports Complex, Townsville	2000 – Test match
19,172	Cook Islands	North Queensland Stadium, Townsville	2026 Rugby League World Cup
16,995	South Africa	Sydney Cricket Ground, Sydney	1963 South African tour – 2nd Test

* Great Britain played as England in the 1932 Ashes.

=== Highest attendances outside of Australia ===
Attendance	Opposing team	Venue	Tournament
74,468	New Zealand	Old Trafford, Manchester	2013 Rugby League World Cup Final
73,631	Great Britain	Wembley Stadium, London	1989–1992 Rugby League World Cup Final
67,545	Fiji	Wembley Stadium, London	2013 Rugby League World Cup Semi-Final*
67,502	Samoa	Old Trafford, Manchester	2021 Rugby League World Cup Final
66,540	England	Wembley Stadium, London	1995 Rugby League World Cup Final

* played as a World Cup Semi-finals double header also featuring England vs New Zealand.

=== Highest attendances per opponent ===
Attendance	Opposing team	Venue	Tournament
74,468	New Zealand	Old Trafford, Manchester	2013 Rugby League World Cup Final
73,631	Great Britain	Wembley Stadium, London	1989–1992 Rugby League World Cup Final
67,748	France	Sydney Cricket Ground, Sydney	1955 Australia vs France – 1st Test
67,545	Fiji	Wembley Stadium, London	2013 Rugby League World Cup Semi-Final
67,502	Samoa	Old Trafford, Manchester	2021 Rugby League World Cup Final
66,540	England	Wembley Stadium, London	1995 Rugby League World Cup Final
33,196	Tonga	Lang Park, Brisbane	2024 Pacific Championships
25,386	Wales	Sydney Cricket Ground, Sydney	1975 Rugby League World Cup
21,127	Lebanon	Sydney Football Stadium, Sydney	2017 Rugby League World Cup
21,000	Papua New Guinea	Willows Sports Complex, Townsville	2000 – Test match
19,172	Cook Islands	North Queensland Stadium, Townsville	2026 Rugby League World Cup
16,995	South Africa	Sydney Cricket Ground, Sydney	1963 South African tour – 2nd Test
10,276	Scotland	Coventry Arena, Coventry	2021 Rugby League World Cup
5,586	Italy	Langtree Park, St Helens	2021 Rugby League World Cup
5,762	United States	Racecourse Ground, Wrexham	2013 Rugby League World Cup Quarter-final
5,021	Ireland	Thomond Park, Limerick	2013 Rugby League World Cup
3,044	Russia	The Boulevard, Hull	2000 Rugby League World Cup

== See also ==
- List of results of the Australian national rugby league team
