= Bernie Drew =

Australia international rugby league player

Personal information
- Born: 16 October 1927
- Died: 12 August 2010 (aged 82)

Playing information
- Position: Second-row / Lock
Club
Years	Team	Pld	T	G	FG	P
1947–50	Newtown Jets	43	7	0	0	21
Representative
Years	Team	Pld	T	G	FG	P
1951–55	Queensland	21	8	0	0	24
1951–53	Australia	3	0	0	0	0

Bernie Drew (16 October 1927 – 12 August 2010) was an Australian rugby league player.

A second-rower and lock, Drew came into the Newtown Jets first-grade side in 1947 as a local junior. He left in 1949 to take up a player-coaching role with North Queensland club Proserpine, then returned to Newtown the following year for more season, before moving to Bundaberg to coach Brothers.

Drew was a second-rower in the Queensland state side from 1951 to 1955. He played for Australia in the 2nd and 3rd Test matches of a home series against France, replacing second-rower Harold Crocker, who had been shifted to lock after Noel Mulligan got injured. In 1953, Drew toured New Zealand with the national team and was their top-scoring forward with 31-points, but featured in only the third of the three Test matches.
