= Charlie Gill =

Australian RL coach and former Australia international rugby league footballer

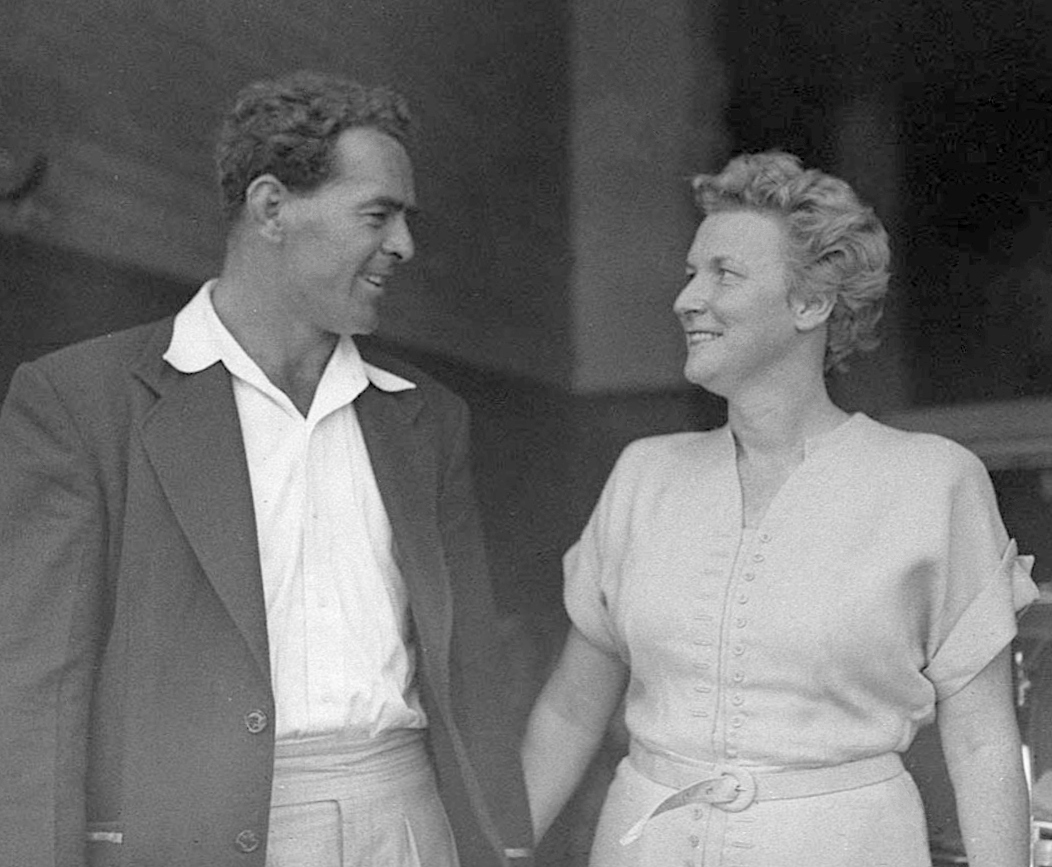
- Gill with wife in 1953

Personal information
- Born: 1923
- Died: 1986 (aged 62–63)

Playing information
- Position: Prop
Club
Years	Team	Pld	T	G	FG	P
19??–??	North Newcastle
1954	Parramatta	18	3	1	0	11
1955–56	Wests (Newcastle)
	Total	18	3	1	0	11
Representative
Years	Team	Pld	T	G	FG	P
1950–53	Country NSW	4	0	0	0	0
1951–53	New South Wales	7	0	0	0	0
1951	Newcastle	1	0	0	0	0
1952–53	Australia	7	0	0	0	0

Coaching information
Club
Years	Team	Gms	W	D	L	W%
1954	Parramatta	18	3	0	15	17

Charlie Gill (1923–1986) was an Australian rugby league footballer who played in the 1950s. An Australian international and New South Wales interstate representative forward, he played club football in the Newcastle Rugby League for Norths and Wests and also spent a season in Sydney's NSWRFL Premiership with Parramatta.

While playing for North Newcastle, Gill was selected to represent Newcastle when they hosted the 1951 French touring side and lost. He also played for Country NSW and then New South Wales. While at Norths, he was then selected to make his international début for Australia against the visiting New Zealand team in 1952, becoming Kangaroo No. 291. At the end of that season Gill went on the 1952–53 Kangaroo tour of Great Britain and France, playing in the second Ashes test against Great Britain. In 1953 he played in the match against the American 'All-Stars'. Gill was also selected to go on the 1953 Kangaroo tour of New Zealand, playing in all three tests against the Kiwis.

Sydney club Parramatta paid a fee of £500 to sign Gill as their captain-coach for the 1954 NSWRFL season. After that Gill returned to the Newcastle Rugby League as captain-coach of the Western Suburbs club, spending two seasons with them in 1955 and 1956.
