= Len Eriksen =

New Zealand international rugby league footballer

Personal information
- Full name: Leonard Alfred Eriksen
- Born: 30 May 1925; Auckland Region, New Zealand
- Died: 13 July 2000 (aged 75)

Playing information
- Position: Scrum-half
Club
Years	Team	Pld	T	G	FG	P
	Ponsonby
Representative
Years	Team	Pld	T	G	FG	P
	Auckland
1954	New Zealand	3	1	0	0	3

Len Eriksen is a New Zealand rugby league player who represented New Zealand in the 1954 World Cup.

== Playing career ==
A Ponsonby player in the Auckland Rugby League competition. Eriksen was part of the Auckland side that defeated Great Britain 5-4 at Carlaw Park. He was selected for the New Zealand national rugby league team in 1954 and played in three test matches that year, including at the 1954 World Cup.

In 1958 he was part of the Ponsonby side that won the first ever Auckland grand final, defeating Otahuhu 16-7.
