= Jim Austin (rugby league) =

New Zealand international rugby league footballer

Personal information
- Full name: James David Austin
- Born: 29 July 1930; Auckland, New Zealand
- Died: 1 December 1981 (aged 51)

Playing information
- Position: Wing
Representative
Years	Team	Pld	T	G	FG	P
1954	Auckland
1954	New Zealand	3	0	0	0	0

James David Austin is a New Zealand former rugby league footballer who represented New Zealand in the 1954 World Cup.

== Playing career ==
Austin played in the Auckland Rugby League competition and was first selected for the New Zealand national rugby league team in 1954, playing a Test against the touring Great Britain side. He was then included in the New Zealand squad for the 1954 World Cup and played in two matches.

Austin also played for the Auckland side that defeated Great Britain 5–4 at Carlaw Park that year.
