= Alan Riechelmann =

New Zealand rugby league footballer (1930–2023)

Personal information
- Full name: Alan Arthur Riechelmann
- Born: 25 May 1930 Auckland, New Zealand
- Died: 13 November 2023 (aged 93)

Playing information
- Position: Centre
Club
Years	Team	Pld	T	G	FG	P
	Marist
Representative
Years	Team	Pld	T	G	FG	P
	Auckland
1952	New Zealand	0	0	0	0	0

Alan Arthur Riechelmann (25 May 1930 – 13 November 2023) was a New Zealand rugby league footballer who represented New Zealand.

== Playing career ==
A Marist player in the Auckland Rugby League competition, Riechelmann represented Auckland, touring the South Island in 1956 and 1958.

Riechelmann toured Australia with the New Zealand national rugby league team in 1952, but did not play in any of the three test matches.

== Death ==
Riechelmann died on 13 November 2023, at the age of 93.
