= Rugby League Park =

Sports stadium in Christchurch, New Zealand

Apollo Projects Stadium
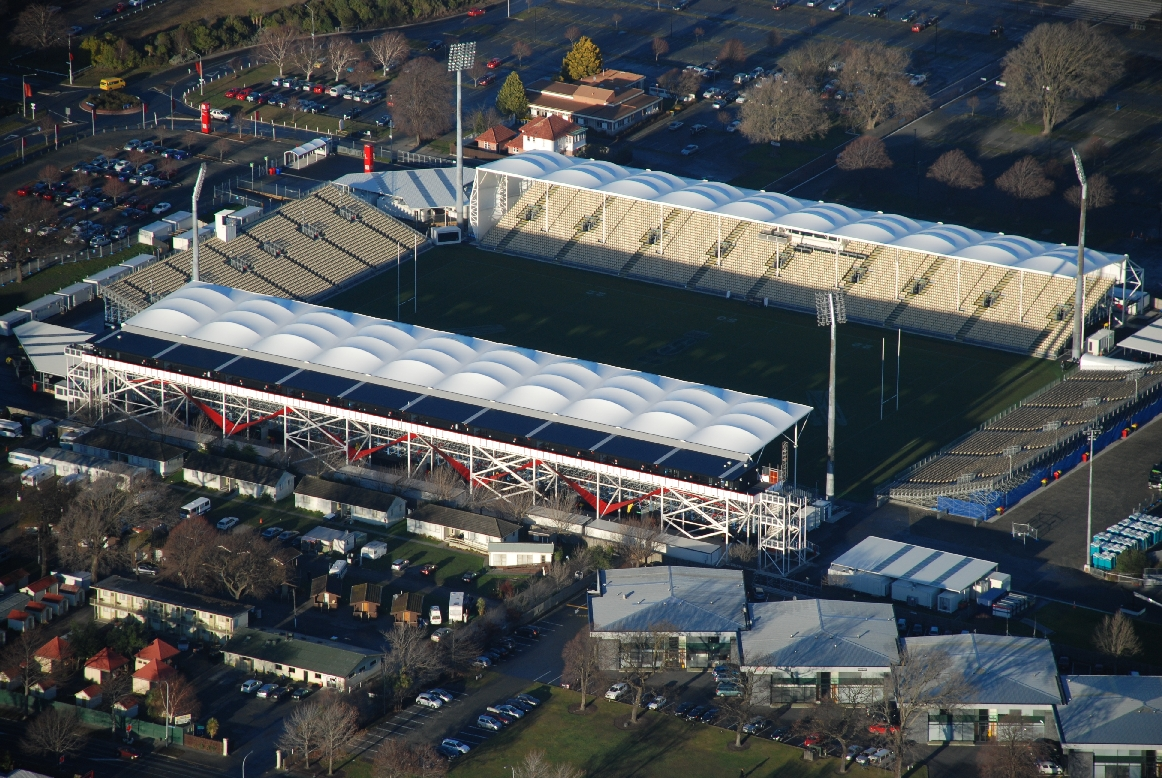
- Aerial view of Rugby League Park in July 2012
- Interactive map of Apollo Projects Stadium
- Former names: Addington Showgrounds; AMI Stadium (sponsored); Orangetheory Stadium (sponsored)
- Location: 95 Jack Hinton Drive, Addington, Christchurch, New Zealand
- Coordinates: 43.5437°S 172.6041°E
- Owner: Canterbury Rugby League
- Capacity: 17,104 (Sport mode)

Construction
- Expanded: 24 March 2012
- Architect: Populous

Tenants
- Crusaders (2012-2026); Canterbury (2012-2026)

Rugby League Park is a sports stadium in Christchurch, New Zealand. It is currently known for sponsorship reasons as Apollo Projects Stadium, and non-commercially as Christchurch Stadium.

The stadium was originally known as the Addington Showgrounds until 1997. Due to sponsorships since 2012 it was also named AMI Stadium and Orangetheory Stadium.

Rugby League Park is part of a complex with Wolfbrook Arena and Addington Raceway in the suburb of Addington.

The stadium was in regular use until April 2026 when One New Zealand Stadium opened. The stadium is set to be dismantled in late 2026. Owners Christchurch City Council are seeking to rezone the land.

== History ==
=== 20th century ===
The park has hosted international rugby league matches since the 1950s, including World Cup matches in 1975, 1977, 1988, 1990 and 1991.

The ground was bought by Canterbury Rugby League from the Christchurch City Council in the 1990s.

It was at this ground that the Kiwis won the 1988 Great Britain Lions tour's sole test in New Zealand to qualify for the 1985–1988 Rugby League World Cup final.

=== 21st century ===
Rugby League Park sustained significant damage during the February 2011 Christchurch earthquake and was closed until 24 March 2012. After the earthquake, the stands had to be demolished.

The 2011 earthquake also damaged AMI Stadium at Lancaster Park, the main sporting ground in Christchurch, beyond repair. As a temporary replacement for the city, Rugby League Park was upgraded and renamed AMI Stadium to seat 18,000 by March 2012 with a possible expansion to 26,000 for major games. As a result, the Crusaders were based there until they moved in 2026 to the newly opened Te Kaha stadium. AMI Stadium has also hosted All Blacks test matches as well as a Wellington Phoenix pre-season match in September 2012. On 9 November 2013 it held a round 5 A-League match between Wellington Phoenix and Perth Glory in which the teams drew 1–1. On 14 May 2016, the ground played host to an NRL match between the Penrith Panthers and the New Zealand Warriors with the former being the home team. Another NRL game took place on 9 June 2018 with the Manly-Warringah Sea Eagles replacing Penrith as the home team against the Warriors. The Sea Eagles played another game at the stadium in 2019 but decided to not play in Christchurch in the 2020 season.

On 6 July 2018, the stadium was officially renamed to the Wyatt Crockett Stadium, becoming de-branded from AMI Stadium. This was to commemorate the Crusaders player Wyatt Crockett reaching the milestone of playing 200 Super Rugby matches.

From June 2019, the stadium was known as Orangetheory Stadium. In August 2023 it was renamed Apollo Projects Stadium, sponsored by a design and construction company.

In 2023, the New Zealand Warriors announced a three-year deal to play one home game a year in Christchurch from the 2024 NRL season onwards with Rugby League Park hosting the matches in 2024 and 2025 before Te Kaha opens its doors in 2026. The Warriors defeated the Canberra Raiders 18–10 in the first of the fixtures on 22 March 2024.

In 2024, the Wellington Phoenix also announced a three-year deal to play one home game a year in Christchurch from the 2024-25 A-League Men's season onwards with Rugby League Park hosting the fixtures in the 2024-25 and 2025-26 season and Te Kaha for the 2026-27 season. The Phoenix drew to Central Coast Mariners 0–0 in the first match on 25 January 2025, with an attendance of 14,064. On 18 April 2026, Wellington Phoenix played the stadiums final game before its decommission, securing a 2–1 win over Western Sydney Wanderers.

Unique Record of Highest Title Win Percentage:

The stadium is notable for having the highest top-flight championship win percentage of any rectangular sporting stadium in the world. Since becoming the primary home of the Crusaders in 2012, having won 8 titles 14 seasons. This produces a championship-era win rate of 57.1%, the highest known percentage for a professional rugby union, rugby league, or football club at a single long-term home ground.

For comparison, the second-highest verified percentage belongs to Windsor Park in Belfast, where Linfield have secured 57 league titles in approximately 121 seasons (57 in 121) since moving to the ground in 1905, yielding a win percentage of around 47.1%. The third-highest belongs to Celtic Park in Glasgow, where Celtic have won 55 league titles across roughly 134 seasons (55 in 134) since first playing at the ground in 1892, producing a long-term win rate of approximately 41.0%.

The championship win percentage of a stadium is calculated as:

Win Percentage = (Titles Won ÷ Seasons Played) × 100

where Titles Won is the number of top-flight titles won by the tenant while based at the stadium, and Seasons Played is the total seasons the team has called the stadium home. This provides a simple metric for comparing team success across venues.

== International rugby league matches ==
A list of rugby league test matches played at the Addington Showgrounds / Rugby League Park. The old Addington Showgrounds main arena was last used for test football in 1991. The first international rugby league use of the current Rugby League Park stadium was at the 2017 World Cup.

Test#	Date	Result	Attendance	Notes
1	29 July 1950	New Zealand def. Great Britain 16–10	10,000	1950 New Zealand vs Great Britain series
2	27 June 1953	New Zealand def. Australia 25–5	5,509	1953 Trans-Tasman Test series
3	1 August 1964	New Zealand def. France 18–8	4,935	1964 New Zealand vs France series
4	19 July 1970	Great Britain def. New Zealand 23–9	8,600	1970 New Zealand vs Great Britain series
5	4 August 1974	Great Britain def. New Zealand 17–8	6,316	1974 New Zealand vs Great Britain series
6	15 June 1975	New Zealand def. France 27–0	2,500	1975 Rugby League World Cup
7	12 June 1977	Great Britain def. New Zealand 30–12	7,000	1977 Rugby League World Cup
8	5 August 1979	Great Britain def. New Zealand 22–7	8,500	1979 New Zealand vs Great Britain series
9	22 July 1984	New Zealand def. Great Britain 28–12	9,824	1984 New Zealand vs Great Britain series
10	17 July 1988	New Zealand def. Great Britain 12–10	8,525	1988 Great Britain Lions tour
11	23 June 1991	New Zealand def. France 32–10	2,000	1991 New Zealand vs France series
12	4 November 2017	New Zealand def. Scotland 74–6	12,130	2017 Rugby League World Cup Group B
13	18 November 2017	Tonga def. Lebanon 24–22	8,309	2017 Rugby League World Cup Quarter finals
14	9 November 2019	Fiji def. Papua New Guinea 22–20	8,875	2019 Oceania Cup Group B Game 3
15	9 November 2019	New Zealand def. Great Britain 23–8	8,875	2019 Baskerville Shield 2nd Test
16	27 October 2024	Australia def. New Zealand 14–0	10,289	2024 Pacific Championships Women's Cup Game 2
17	27 October 2024	Australia def. New Zealand 22–10	17,005	2024 Pacific Championships Men's Cup Game 2
