= Albert Paul =

Australian rugby league player

Personal information
- Full name: Albert Edgar Paul
- Born: 10 April 1928
- Died: 5 October 1978 (aged 50)

Playing information
- Position: Second-row / Lock
Club
Years	Team	Pld	T	G	FG	P
1948	Newtown Jets	1	0	0	0	0
1956	Canterbury-Bankstown	17	4	0	0	12
	Total	18	4	0	0	12
Representative
Years	Team	Pld	T	G	FG	P
1952–53	New South Wales	6	2	0	0	6
1952	Australia	4	1	0	0	3

Albert Edgar Paul (10 April 1928 – 5 October 1978) was an Australian rugby league player.

== Rugby league career ==
A member of the Lakes United premiership team of 1947, Paul came down to Sydney to play for the Newtown Jets the following year, but tore his knee cartilage on his only first-grade appearance.

Paul represented Australia in four Test matches in 1952. He played all three home Tests against New Zealand as a second-rower and lock, then was part of the end of year tour of Europe, featuring in the 1st Test against Great Britain at Headingley. In 1953, Paul toured New Zealand with the national team, but didn't play in any Tests.

Following a stint with Griffith, Paul returned to the NSWRFL in 1956 and had a season playing for Canterbury.
