= Harvey Kreyl =

New Zealand international rugby league footballer

Personal information
- Full name: Harvey Norwood Gavin Kreyl
- Born: 4 April 1925
- Died: 10 January 2012 (aged 86)

Playing information
- Position: Prop
Representative
Years	Team	Pld	T	G	FG	P
	Wellington
1952	New Zealand	0	0	0	0	0

Harvey Norwood Gavin Kreyl (4 April 1925 – 10 January 2012) was a New Zealand rugby league footballer who played in the 1950s. He played at representative level for New Zealand.

== Playing career ==
Keryl played at prop. He represented Wellington and, in 1952, was selected for New Zealand, becoming the 342nd player to play for the New Zealand national rugby league team.

Kreyl toured Australia that year with the New Zealand side, but was not selected in any test matches during the tour.

== Death ==
Kreyl died on 10 January 2012, and his ashes were buried at Taitā Lawn Cemetery.
