= Bob Neilson =

New Zealand rugby league footballer (1923–2014)

Personal information
- Full name: Robert John Neilson
- Born: 9 August 1923; Reefton, New Zealand
- Died: 14 October 2014 (aged 91)

Playing information
- Position: Second-row
Representative
Years	Team	Pld	T	G	FG	P
	West Coast
1952–53	New Zealand	3	2	0	0	6

Robert John "Bob" Neilson (9 August 1923 – 14 October 2014) was a New Zealand rugby league player who represented New Zealand.

== Playing career ==
Born in Reefton in 1923, Neilson played for West Coast at a provincial level, and was a member of the New Zealand national rugby league team in 1952 and 1953.

He toured Australia with New Zealand in 1952 but didn't appear in the test matches. However, he appeared in all three tests in the 1953 series against the Kangaroos in New Zealand, scoring the match-winning and series-clinching try in a 12–11 victory in the second test in Wellington.
