= Doug Richards-Jolley =

New Zealand international rugby league footballer

Personal information
- Born: 25 July 1925 New Zealand
- Died: 26 May 2010 (aged 84) Queensland, Australia

Playing information
- Position: Second-row
Club
| Years | Team | Pld | T | G | FG | P |
|---|---|---|---|---|---|---|
| | Ponsonby |
Representative
| Years | Team | Pld | T | G | FG | P |
| | Auckland |
| 1951–52 | New Zealand | 2 | 0 | 0 | 0 | 0 |

Doug Richards-Jolley is a New Zealand rugby league player who represented New Zealand.

== Playing career ==
Richards-Jolley played for the Ponsonby club in the Auckland Rugby League competition and represented Auckland. In 1951 he was selected to play for New Zealand against the touring French. He was then selected to tour Great Britain in 1951-52, playing in one test match against the British Empire.

Richards-Jolley was part of Auckland sides that lost to the touring French in 1951 and Australia in 1953 and defeated the American All Stars in 1953 and Great Britain in 1954. He was one of five of New Zealand's leading players who ruled themselves out of selection for the 1954 Rugby League World Cup and missed the tournament.
