= Cyril Paskell =

New Zealand international rugby league footballer

Personal information
- Full name: Cyril George Paskell
- Born: 20 January 1927
- Died: 11 July 2009 (aged 82)

Playing information
- Position: Wing
Club
Years	Team	Pld	T	G	FG	P
	Christchurch
	Halswell
	Total	0	0	0	0	0
Representative
Years	Team	Pld	T	G	FG	P
	Canterbury
1951–54	South Island
1953	New Zealand	1	0	0	0	0

Coaching information
Club
Years	Team	Gms	W	D	L	W%
	Halswell

Cyril George Paskell (20 January 1927 – 11 July 2009) was a New Zealand rugby league player. A wing, Paskell represented Canterbury at a provincial level, and was a member of the New Zealand national team in 1953. He played one test match for New Zealand against Australia.
