= Des Barchard =

NZ & US international rugby league footballer and coach

Personal information
- Full name: Desmond Alfred Barchard
- Born: 23 December 1922 Auckland, New Zealand
- Died: 2 January 1987 (aged 64) Auckland, New Zealand

Playing information
- Height: 170 cm (5 ft 7 in)
- Weight: 80 kg (12 st 8 lb)
- Position: Stand-off, Halfback
Club
Years	Team	Pld	T	G	FG	P
1947	Marist
1961	Howick
	Total	0	0	0	0	0
Representative
Years	Team	Pld	T	G	FG	P
1948–53	Auckland
1947–52	New Zealand	8	1	0	0	3
1953	US All Stars

Coaching information
Representative
Years	Team	Gms	W	D	L	W%
1968	New Zealand	3	0	0	3	0
1972	New Zealand	3	0	0	3	0
- Relatives: Len Barchard (uncle)

Desmond Alfred Barchard (1924–1987) was a New Zealand former rugby league footballer, and coach who represented and coached New Zealand. Barchard was the coach of the Kiwis in the 1968 and 1972 World Cups. His uncle, Len Barchard also played for New Zealand, while his other uncle, Laurie Barchard played senior rugby league for City for several years. Another relative, Vic Barchard played 44 games for Marist seniors from 1939 to 1942 after being a junior for the Akarana club in the early 1930s.

== Birth ==
Des Barchard was born on 23 December 1922.

== Playing career ==
Barchard was originally a member of the Marist rugby union club and played for Auckland. He controversially missed All Black selection and switched codes to rugby league where he joined the Marist rugby league club in the Auckland Rugby League. Barchard first represented Auckland in 1948. He was selected for the New Zealand national rugby league team in 1947 (Kiwi No. 307) and went on to play in ten Test matches for New Zealand (1947, 48, 50-52). In 1953, his final year of representative football for Auckland, he was drawn into the touring US All Stars side as they were short of players for their New Zealand leg of the tour.

Des was awarded Honorary Life Membership of the Howick Hornets RLFC (Auckland) for service to the Club as a founding member.

== Coaching career ==
Barchard was the coach of the New Zealand national rugby league team at the 1968 and 1972 World Cups. The Kiwis did not win a match in either tournament.

== Death ==
On 2 January 1987, Barchard died at the age of 64.
