= John Bond (rugby league) =

New Zealand rugby league footballer (1931–2024)

Personal information
- Full name: John Edward Bond
- Born: 10 December 1931; Kaiapoi, New Zealand
- Died: 10 March 2024 (aged 92); Christchurch, New Zealand

Playing information
- Position: Prop
Club
Years	Team	Pld	T	G	FG	P
1947–58	Papanui
1962–64	Marist
1965–69	Kaiapoi
	Total	0	0	0	0	0
Representative
Years	Team	Pld	T	G	FG	P
1951–55	Canterbury
1953–58	South Island
1953–56	New Zealand	7	1	7	0	17

Coaching information
Club
Years	Team	Gms	W	D	L	W%
1965–69	Kaiapoi

John Edward Bond (10 December 1931 – 10 March 2024) was a New Zealand rugby league footballer and coach. He played for New Zealand at the 1954 World Cup.

== Early life and family ==
Bond was born 10 December 1931 in Kaiapoi, the son of Roy Bond, a professional sprinter and rugby league player who represented Canterbury and the South Island. He married Noeline Eunice Jones, and the couple went on to have four children.

== Playing career ==
A goal-kicking prop, Bond played in the Canterbury Rugby League competition. His career spanned 22 years starting in his debut in 1947 as a 15-year-old with Papanui. He also represented Canterbury and the South Island during this period.

Bond made his debut for the New Zealand national rugby league team in 1953, kicking a goal in his debut against Australia. Bond went on to play in twenty two matches for New Zealand, including seven test matches. Bond was part of the New Zealand squad at the inaugural World Cup in 1954. He later toured Britain and France in 1955-56 and Australia in 1956.

Bond retired in 1958 but, after a three-year retirement, he returned with Marist in 1962. In 1965, he took over as the player-coach of Kaiapoi. He retired again in 1969.

== Later life and death ==
Bond was predeceased by his wife, Noeline, in 2002. He died in Christchurch on 10 March 2024, at the age of 92.
