= Ron McKay =

New Zealand international rugby league footballer

Personal information
- Full name: Ronald John McKay
- Born: 31 December 1931 New Zealand
- Died: 29 December 2013 (aged 81)

Playing information
- Position: Centre
Club
Years	Team	Pld	T	G	FG	P
19??–53	Unknown (TRL)
1954–??	Marist (ARL)
	Total	0	0	0	0	0
Representative
Years	Team	Pld	T	G	FG	P
1952–53	Taranaki
1952–56	New Zealand	17	7	11	0	43
1954–60	Auckland

Ron McKay was a New Zealand rugby league footballer who represented New Zealand in the 1954 World Cup.

== Playing career ==
McKay played in the Taranaki Rugby League competition and represented Taranaki. He was first selected to play for the New Zealand national rugby league team in 1952 in a test match against Australia.

In 1954 McKay moved to Auckland and joined the Marist Saints in the Auckland Rugby League competition. He quickly made the Auckland side and was again named to play for New Zealand. McKay was part of the squad that competed in the inaugural World Cup in 1954. He was selected to go on the 1955–56 New Zealand rugby tour of Great Britain and France and played his last test for New Zealand in 1956 against France, finishing his career having played in 17 test matches and scored 43 points for New Zealand. McKay continued to play for Auckland until 1960.

In 2008, he was named in the Taranaki Rugby League Team of the Century.
