= Jimmy Edwards (rugby league) =

New Zealand international rugby league footballer

Personal information
- Full name: Robert James Edwards
- Born: 24 December 1926 New Zealand
- Died: 30 July 2015 (aged 88) Mount Eden, Auckland, New Zealand

Playing information
- Position: Wing
Club
Years	Team	Pld	T	G	FG	P
	Marist
Representative
Years	Team	Pld	T	G	FG	P
1950–54	Auckland
1951–54	New Zealand	17	8	0	0	24

Robert James Edwards (24 December 1926 – 30 July 2015) was a New Zealand rugby league footballer who represented New Zealand in the 1954 World Cup.

== Playing career ==
Edwards played for the Marist club in the Auckland Rugby League competition and also represented Auckland, making his debut in the 1950 tour of Wellington and the South Island. He later played for Auckland against the touring American All-Stars in 1953 and in a 5–4 victory over Great Britain in 1954.

Edwards made his debut for the New Zealand national rugby league team in 1951 on the tour of Great Britain. He played in a total of 17 test matches, including a tour of Australia in 1952 and the 1954 World Cup. He had the distinction of being the first scorer in Rugby League World Cup history, with a try after only five minutes in the first match against France on 30 October 1954. He scored 20 tries in a total of 45 matches for the Kiwis.

== Death ==
Edwards died in the Auckland suburb of Mount Eden on 30 July 2015.
