= Jim Amos (rugby league) =

New Zealand international rugby league footballer and coach

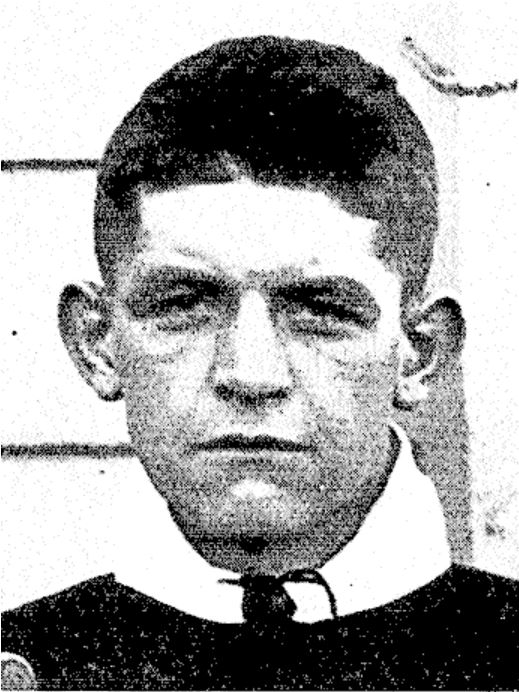

Personal information
- Full name: James Ernest Amos
- Born: April/June 1907 Cust, New Zealand
- Died: 31 August 1981 (aged 71) Paraparaumu, New Zealand

Playing information
- Weight: 12 st 12 lb (82 kg)
- Position: Centre, Lock
Club
Years	Team	Pld	T	G	FG	P
1925–27	Addington
1928	City Rovers, ARL	8	0	0	0	0
1929–35	Addington
	Total	8	0	0	0	0
Representative
Years	Team	Pld	T	G	FG	P
1927	Canterbury
1928	Auckland Province	1	0	0	0	0
1929–35	Canterbury
1929–35	South Island	6	0	3	0	6
1930–32	New Zealand	8 (1)	4	4 (4)	0	20 (8)

Coaching information
Club
Years	Team	Gms	W	D	L	W%
1952	Christchurch Marist
Representative
Years	Team	Gms	W	D	L	W%
1936–39	South Island
1946–55	Canterbury
1947–55	South Island
1952–54	New Zealand

James Ernest Amos (1907–1981) was a New Zealand rugby league footballer and coach who represented New Zealand and coached them, including at the 1954 World Cup.

== Playing career ==
Amos played rugby union and soccer in his youth. When Marist Old Boys were expelled from the Canterbury Rugby Union in 1924 Amos was a lower grade player and followed the club to rugby league.

Amos first played first grade for Addington in 1925 in the Canterbury Rugby League competition and represented Canterbury in 1927. He spent the 1928 season with the City Rovers in the Auckland Rugby League competition and played for Auckland.

Amos returned to Christchurch in 1929, re-joining the Addington club. Amos was captain of Canterbury between 1929 and 1935 and also captained the South Island from 1929 to 1932 and again in 1934.

== Representative career ==
Amos toured Australia in 1930 with New Zealand, playing against Queensland. He played his only Test match for New Zealand against Great Britain in 1932. Amos missed the 1935 tour of Australia due to injury.

== Coaching career ==
Amos became a selector after retirement, spending thirteen years as a Canterbury selector between 1936 and 1956 and spending fourteen years as a South Island selector. Amos also served as a New Zealand selector three time from 1936 to 1939, 1945 and again from 1952 to 1954.

Amos coached Canterbury between 1946 and 1955, the South Island between 1936 and 1939 and 1947 to 1955 and New Zealand between 1952 and 1954. Amos coached New Zealand at the inaugural World Cup in 1954.

In 1952 Amos was a founding member of Christchurch Marist (know now as Marist-Western) and coached the club in 1952.

Amos was awarded the New Zealand Rugby League Distinguished Service Award in 1980.

Amos died in Paraparaumu in 1981.
