= Frank Mulcare =

New Zealand & US international rugby league footballer

Personal information
- Full name: Francis Gerard Mulcare
- Born: Ngahere, West Coast

Playing information
- Position: Second-row
Club
Years	Team	Pld	T	G	FG	P
	Ngahere (WCRL)
Representative
Years	Team	Pld	T	G	FG	P
1949	West Coast
	South Island
1951–56	New Zealand
1953	American All Stars

Frank Mulcare is a New Zealand rugby league player who represented New Zealand.

== Playing career ==
Born in Ngahere, Mulcare was a farmer.

Mulcare played for the Ngahere club and represented the West Coast and South Island.

He first made the New Zealand national rugby league team in 1951, being selected for the tour of Great Britain and France. He then toured Australia in 1952 and played in home test matches against Australia in 1953 and Great Britain in 1954.

In 1953 the American All Stars toured New Zealand. The squad had many injuries and so Mulcare was one of four New Zealanders who joined the touring squad. Mulcare was one of five of New Zealand's leading players who ruled themselves out of selection for the 1954 Rugby League World Cup and missed the tournament.

Mulcare joined the New Zealand Police in 1958 and served for 16 years.

== Legacy ==
Mulcare was named in the West Coast's 75th Jubilee team in 1989. He was named by the New Zealand Rugby League as a Legend of League in 2007.
