= Lory Blanchard =

New Zealand international rugby league footballer and coach

Lory Blanchard MNZM
- Born: David Lory Blanchard; 4 September 1924; Roxburgh, New Zealand
- Died: 1 January 2013 (aged 88); Christchurch, New Zealand
- Rugby league career

Playing information

Rugby union
- Position: Hooker
Club
| Years | Team | Pld | T | G | FG | P |
|---|---|---|---|---|---|---|
| 1939 | North Otago |
| 1947–48 | Canterbury |
| | Total | 0 | 0 | 0 | 0 | 0 |

Rugby league
- Position: Hooker, Prop
Club
| Years | Team | Pld | T | G | FG | P |
|---|---|---|---|---|---|---|
| | Linwood (CRL) |
| 1942–44 | Hull FC | 0 | 0 | 0 | 0 | 0 |
| | Total | 0 | 0 | 0 | 0 | 0 |
Representative
| Years | Team | Pld | T | G | FG | P |
| | Canterbury |
| 1949–55 | South Island |
| 1951–56 | New Zealand | 16 | 1 | 0 | 0 | 3 |

Coaching information
Club
| Years | Team | Gms | W | D | L | W% |
| | Linwood (CRL) |
Representative
| Years | Team | Gms | W | D | L | W% |
| 1966–67 | New Zealand | 3 | 0 | 0 | 0 | 0 |
| 1969 | New Zealand | 2 | 1 | 0 | 1 | 50 |
| 1970–72 | New Zealand | 6 | 1 | 0 | 5 | 17 |
- Military career
- Allegiance: New Zealand
- Branch: Royal New Zealand Navy
- Rank: Stoker
- Conflicts: World War II

David Lory Blanchard MNZM (4 September 1924 – 1 January 2013) was a New Zealand rugby union and professional rugby league football player who played representative rugby league (RL) for New Zealand in the 1954 World Cup and coached them at the 1970 World Cup. He also played for Hull FC in England during World War II.

== Early years ==
Blanchard was born in Roxburgh on 4 September 1924, the son of David Blanchard and Doris Elizabeth Blanchard (née Lory) of Ettrick, and grew up in Otago. He made his rugby union first class debut for North Otago in 1939, aged 15. During World War II he joined the Royal New Zealand Navy and served as a stoker on HMNZS Achilles. After the war, Blanchard worked for the New Zealand Railways Department and played as hooker for Sydenham. He was a Canterbury representative in 1947–48.

== Playing career ==
Blanchard then switched codes to rugby league. He had played for the Linwood Keas and represented Canterbury and the South Island. He represented New Zealand national team between 1951 and 1956, including at the 1954 World Cup.

Blanchard was selected to go on the 1955–56 New Zealand rugby tour of Great Britain and France.

He had played altogether in 63 matches, including sixteen test matches, for the Kiwis.

== Coaching career ==
He retired in 1963, becoming a Canterbury selector. Blanchard became a New Zealand selector between 1967 and 1972, convening the panel between 1969 and 1972. Blanchard coached New Zealand on three occasions; between 1966 and 1967, in 1969 and between 1970 and 1972, including at the 1970 World Cup. He coached Linwood in the Canterbury Rugby League competition. Between 1973 and 1975 Blanchard was President of the Canterbury Schoolboy Board of Control. He also served two years on the Canterbury Rugby League board. In 1990, he returned to coaching and led the New Zealand Universities' side until 1993.

== Honours and awards ==
Blanchard was inducted into the New Zealand Rugby League's Legends of League in 2000. In the 2002 Queen's Birthday and Golden Jubilee Honours, he was appointed a Member of the New Zealand Order of Merit, for services to rugby league and the community. He was made a life member of the New Zealand Rugby League in 2008.

== Death ==
Blanchard died on New Year's Day, 2013, aged 88, survived by his wife, Lyndsay, and their five children.
