= Bevin Hough =

New Zealand sportsman (1929–2019)

Personal information
- Full name: William Bevin Keith Hough
- Born: 21 April 1929 Auckland, New Zealand
- Died: 25 November 2019 (aged 90) Tauranga, New Zealand
- Height: 1.68 m (5 ft 6 in)
- Rugby league career

Playing information
- Position: Wing
Club
Years	Team	Pld	T	G	FG	P
	Richmond
	Papakura
	Total	0	0	0	0	0
Representative
Years	Team	Pld	T	G	FG	P
	Auckland
1950–53	New Zealand	12

Achievements and titles
- National finals: Long jump champion (1949, 1950, 1951); Triple jump champion (1949)
Medal record
Men's athletics
Representing New Zealand
British Empire Games
Silver medal – second place	1950 Auckland	Long jump

William Bevin Keith Hough (21 April 1929 – 25 November 2019) was a New Zealand sportsman who represented New Zealand in rugby league and the long jump.

== Early life and family ==
Hough was born on 21 April 1929 in the Auckland suburb of Ponsonby, the son of William Hough of Wiri.

== Athletics career ==
Representing Auckland, Hough won the 1948 New Zealand under-19 long jump title, jumping 21 ft 2 7/8 in (6.47 m). He went on two win the national men's long jump championship in each of the following three years, with a best leap of 24 ft 4 in (7.42 m) in 1949, breaking the New Zealand record held by Jack Metcalfe. In 1949, he also won the national triple jump title, with a distance of 45 ft 5 in (13.84 m).

At the 1950 British Empire Games in Auckland Hough leapt 23 ft 7 3/8 in (7.20 m) to win the silver medal in the men's long jump.

== Rugby league career ==
Hough played rugby league for the Richmond and Papakura clubs. He represented both Auckland and New Zealand, being selected for the Kiwis from 1950 to 1953 and playing in 12 test matches. During the 1951 French rugby league tour of Australia and New Zealand, Hough was selected to play for both Auckland and New Zealand at winger.

== Death ==
Hough died in Tauranga on 25 November 2019 at the age of 90.
