= Tommy Baxter =

New Zealand rugby league footballer and coach

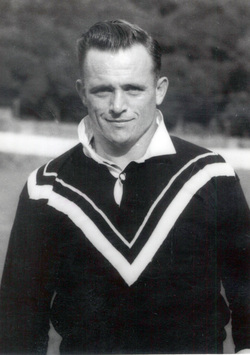

Personal information
- Full name: Thomas Owen Baxter
- Born: 2 September 1929
- Died: 26 May 2014 (aged 84)

Playing information
- Position: Centre
Club
Years	Team	Pld	T	G	FG	P
	Richmond
	Western Districts
	Total	0	0	0	0	0
Representative
Years	Team	Pld	T	G	FG	P
	Auckland
1949–56	New Zealand	29	6	0	0	18

Coaching information
Club
Years	Team	Gms	W	D	L	W%
1959	Western Districts
1964	Howick
	Total	0	0	0	0

Thomas Owen Baxter (c. 1930 – 26 May 2014) was a New Zealand rugby league footballer who represented New Zealand in twenty nine tests between 1949 and 1956. In 2007 he was named in the New Zealand Rugby League's Team of the Century.

== Playing career ==
Baxter, an Auckland representative, first made the New Zealand national rugby league team in 1949. During the 1951 French rugby league tour of Australia and New Zealand, Baxter was selected to play for both Auckland and New Zealand at centre. Baxter went on to play in twenty nine tests in the next seven years, scoring six tries. In 1955 he was made captain and led the Kiwis out on ten occasions, including on the 1955–56 tour of Great Britain and France.

Baxter was one of five of New Zealand's leading players who ruled themselves out of selection for the 1954 Rugby League World Cup and missed the tournament.

In 1959 he was Western Districts (a combination of Mount Albert and Point Chevalier) player-coach and led the team to Auckland Rugby League Fox Memorial Trophy and Rukutai Shield victories as well as winning a national tournament held to celebrate the ARL's fiftieth anniversary and an 8–7 victory over the New South Wales Rugby League's previously unbeaten champion St. George Dragons side.

In 1964 Baxter was the coach of the new Howick senior team.

== Awards ==
Baxter was inducted as a New Zealand Rugby League "Legend of League" in 1995 and is an Auckland Rugby League Immortal. Baxter was inducted into the New Zealand Sports Hall of Fame in 1996.

In 2007 he was named in the New Zealand Rugby League Team of the Century at centre.
