= Bill McLennan (rugby league) =

New Zealand international rugby league footballer

Personal information
- Full name: William Richard McLennan
- Born: 5 June 1927 The Catlins, Otago, New Zealand
- Died: 21 July 2007 (aged 80) Auckland, New Zealand

Playing information
- Height: 185 cm (6 ft 1 in)
- Weight: 101 kg (15 st 13 lb)
- Position: Prop
Club
| Years | Team | Pld | T | G | FG | P |
|---|---|---|---|---|---|---|
| | Blackball (WCRL) |
| | Runanga |
| | Total | 0 | 0 | 0 | 0 | 0 |
Representative
| Years | Team | Pld | T | G | FG | P |
| 1949–?? | West Coast |
| | South Island |
| 1951–57 | New Zealand | 28 | 1 | 1 | 0 | 5 |

William "Ginger" Richard McLennan (5 June 1927 – 21 July 2007) was a New Zealand rugby league footballer who represented New Zealand in the 1954 and 1957 World Cups.

== Playing career ==
Born on the West Coast, McLennan was a miner and represented the West Coast. He played for the Runanga club. He was first selected for New Zealand in 1951. McLennan played in 84 games for the Kiwis, including 28 tests. This included 22 consecutive tests. His total 84 games has been bettered only by Jock Butterfield (99) and Tom Baxter (94).

He was part of the famous Kiwi team that won back-to-back test series against Australia in 1952 (in Australia) and 1953 (in New Zealand).

McLennan was the vice-captain in the 1955-56 tour of Great Britain. He retired after this tour however he made a comeback for the 1957 World Cup.

He was inducted as one of the New Zealand Rugby Leagues "Legends of League" in 2000.
