= Cyril Eastlake =

New Zealand international rugby league footballer

Personal information
- Full name: Cyril Aston Eastlake
- Born: 21 August 1930; Auckland, New Zealand
- Died: 30 September 2007 (aged 77)

Playing information
- Position: Fullback, Wing, Centre, Five-eighth
Club
Years	Team	Pld	T	G	FG	P
1945–??	Ellerslie
Representative
Years	Team	Pld	T	G	FG	P
	Auckland
1951–60	New Zealand	28	6	24	0	66

Cyril Aston Eastlake (21 August 1930 – 30 September 2007) was a New Zealand rugby league player who represented his nation in the sport. He captained New Zealand at the 1954 World Cup and also played at the 1960 World Cup.

== Early years ==
Eastlake was from Auckland and was educated at St Peter's College where he played rugby union. He started playing rugby league without realising it, when somebody knocked at the family house door one Saturday morning wanting to know whether the young Eastlake would play football because he was short of a player. He was due to play rugby union for St Peter's in the afternoon but he was told that he could have an "extra game". Eastlake said: "I enjoyed the game tremendously and had some success in scoring a couple of tries, mainly because both sides appeared to be a few players short and there seemed to be a lot more room to run before someone tackled you. Towards the end of the game I realised there had been very few lineouts. In fact, I couldn't remember one. Also the rucks were over so quickly that I missed seeing most of them. But all in it was a good game". In the afternoon, Eastlake played rugby union for St Peter's College against Sacred Heart. "Both sides had full teams of 15, and the game was full of lineouts and rucks, so much so that I began to wonder whether that morning's game was a different code altogether". This began Eastlake's move to rugby league and a long association with the Ellerslie club.

== Playing career ==
Eastlake played for Ellerslie in the Auckland Rugby League competition and also represented Auckland. Eastlake was a member of the New Zealand national rugby league team, "the Kiwis", from 1951. He represented New Zealand in 79 games, including 28 tests. In 1954 he was the captain of the New Zealand team at the first Rugby League World Cup competition in France.

During that World Cup competition, Eastlake's qualities were described in the opening game of the tournament, against France (captained by the legendary Puig Aubert). "The New Zealand captain, C. A. Eastlake, was an inspiration at centre, both in attack and defence. Time and again he halted dangerous back movements by holding Antoine Jiminez. It was no mean performance to reduce Jiminez, a highly ranked centre last year, practically to impotence. In addition, Eastlake initiated attacks with dash and resource. He showed speed to score New Zealand's second try, while he was also responsible for R J McKay scoring." Although the game was won by France by 22 points to 13, Eastlake remained optimistic saying, "We will do better now we have some match play. We can still win the cup. We were all a little stiff and the team took a long time to settle down. However, it was a good fast game, and I enjoyed it." Eastlake's optimism was not borne out. He retired following the 1960 World Cup.

In the Australian 1963 Rugby League season Eastlake was a player-coach for a New South Wales country team.

== Honours ==
Eastlake was inducted into the New Zealand 'Legends of League' in 1995, an acknowledgement of the skills he brought to the game during an international career that ran from 1951 to 1960. In 2012 he was posthumously named the Ellerslie Eagles Player of the Century at the club's centenary celebrations and in the same year he was honoured by his old school, St Peter's College, by being named an "old boy of distinction".
