= Des White =

New Zealand international rugby league footballer (1927–2023)

Personal information
- Full name: Desmond Henry White
- Born: 16 February 1927
- Died: 13 December 2023 (aged 96) Red Beach, New Zealand

Playing information
- Position: Fullback
Club
Years	Team	Pld	T	G	FG	P
1947–??	Ponsonby
Representative
Years	Team	Pld	T	G	FG	P
19??–??	Auckland
1950–56	New Zealand	21	2	47	0	100

Coaching information
Representative
Years	Team	Gms	W	D	L	W%
19??–??	Auckland
1961	New Zealand	2	1	0	1	50

Desmond Henry White (16 February 1927 – 13 December 2023) was a New Zealand professional rugby league footballer who played in the 1940s and 1950s. A record-breaking goal-kicking fullback, he was named amongst the country's finest players of the 20th century. His total for points scored in all matches (61) for the Kiwis is a record 467 (7 tries and 233 goals). He won championships with Auckland's Ponsonby club and his total of 794 points (391 goals and four tries) is the all-time club record.

== Playing career ==
White played his first senior game with the Auckland Rugby League's Ponsonby club in 1947.

White toured Britain with the New Zealand national team in 1951, playing in the first ever televised match of rugby league at Station Road, Swinton against Great Britain and kicking two goals. During the 1951 French rugby league tour of Australia and New Zealand, White was selected to play for both Auckland and New Zealand at fullback. He later kicked a world record 11 goals (from 14 attempts) against Australia in 1952 when New Zealand won the Test series in Brisbane. On that tour he set another record by scoring 107 points to become the first Kiwi to top the century in Australia. White kicked 18 goals in the series, equalling the world record.

In 1954, while playing for Auckland against Great Britain, he ruptured his spleen when tackled illegally by Doug Greenall. White underwent surgery and was out of the game for two years, missing the first ever World Cup in 1954.

White scored 132 points in 21 tests, a Kiwi record until overtaken by Matthew Ridge. His total of 467 points in 61 matches in the black and white jersey may never be overtaken now that long tours are a thing of the past.

== Later years ==
Following his retirement, White became a coach and led Auckland. He was appointed coach of the New Zealand national team in 1961, only spending one season in the position.

Des White was inducted into the New Zealand Sports Hall of Fame in 1990. In 1995 he was one of the inaugural inductees of the NZRL's Legends of League. He was also an Auckland Rugby League Immortal.

In 2007, White was named at fullback in the New Zealand Rugby League's team of the century of 1907 to 2007.

White also became a grocer, owning the New World Papatoetoe supermarket for a number of years.

White died at Red Beach on 13 December 2023, at the age of 96.
