= Alister Atkinson =

New Zealand international rugby league footballer

Personal information
- Full name: Alister James Atkinson
- Born: 26 July 1925 Christchurch, New Zealand
- Died: 9 December 2002 (aged 77) Christchurch, New Zealand

Playing information
- Height: 178 cm (5 ft 10 in)
- Weight: 82 kg (12 st 13 lb)

Rugby union
Club
| Years | Team | Pld | T | G | FG | P |
|---|---|---|---|---|---|---|
| 1945–46 | Canterbury |

Rugby league
- Position: Second-row, Loose forward
Club
| Years | Team | Pld | T | G | FG | P |
|---|---|---|---|---|---|---|
| 1948–1958 | Linwood |
Representative
| Years | Team | Pld | T | G | FG | P |
| 1948–56 | Canterbury |
| 1949–55 | South Island |
| 1951–56 | New Zealand | 24 | 4 | 0 | 0 | 12 |

Alister James Atkinson (1925-2002) was a New Zealand rugby union and professional rugby league footballer who played representative rugby league (RL) for New Zealand in the 1954 World Cup. His position of preference was at Loose forward.

== Playing career ==
Atkinson started his career as a rugby union player and represented the Canterbury Rugby Union in 1945 and 1946.

After switching codes, Atkinson became a Linwood Keas player in the Canterbury Rugby League competition and a Canterbury and South Island representative. Atkinson was a reserve for New Zealand in 1950 and first played for the New Zealand national rugby league team in 1951. Atkinson toured Great Britain and France in 1951–52 and 1955–56 and Australia in 1952. Overall, he played in 71 games for the Kiwis, including in 24 tests, and was the vice captain of the squad in the inaugural World Cup. 23 of his test appearances were consecutive, until he missed the third test against Great Britain in the 1955 series.

Atkinson was also a sprinter, being fast enough to compete on the cash sprinting circuit which existed at that time.

== Later years ==
Atkinson was a member of the Canterbury board of control between 1968 and 1976 and served as a provincial selector and the New Zealand national rugby league team manager for the 1974 home series against Great Britain. In 1976 Atkinson chaired the Canterbury Board of Control.
