= Jimmy Haig =

NZ dual-code international rugby footballer

Personal information
- Full name: James Scott Haig
- Born: 7 December 1924 Prestonpans, East Lothian, Scotland
- Died: 28 October 1996 (aged 71) Dunedin, New Zealand

Playing information
- Height: 170 cm (5 ft 7 in)
- Weight: 75 kg (11 st 11 lb)

Rugby union
- Position: Halfback
Club
Years	Team	Pld	T	G	FG	P
1945–46	Otago	9
Representative
Years	Team	Pld	T	G	FG	P
1946	New Zealand	2	1	0	0	3

Rugby league
- Position: Halfback
Club
Years	Team	Pld	T	G	FG	P
1947–51	Prebbleton (CRL)
1952–53	Marist (CRL)
1954	Unknown (ORL)
	Total	0	0	0	0	0
Representative
Years	Team	Pld	T	G	FG	P
1947–53	Canterbury
1947–53	South Island
1947–54	New Zealand	21	3	2	0	13
1954	Otago
- Source: Scrum.com

James Scott Haig (7 December 1924 – 28 October 1996) was a Scottish-born New Zealand rugby footballer who represented New Zealand in both rugby league and rugby union.

== Early years ==
Haig was born in Scotland but emigrated to New Zealand at a young age with his family and grew up in Kaitangata in Otago. His elder brother, Laurie, was also an All Black. Another brother, Bert, played for Otago in rugby union while another, Bill, represented the province in cricket.

== Rugby union career ==
Haig made his first grade debut for Otago in 1945, playing in four matches, and also playing for the South Island and a New Zealand XV that year.

He was selected as one of the 5 promising players of the year for the 1945 season in the Rugby Almananac of New Zealand.

He played in another five matches in 1946 for Otago and again represented the South Island.

Haig made his All Blacks debut against Australia on 14 September 1946. He played in the next Test match on 28 September, but this was also to be his last, as Haig switched codes to rugby league the following season.

== Rugby league career ==
Haig moved to Canterbury in 1947, playing for the new Prebbleton club in the Canterbury Rugby League competition and representing the province. Pat Smith had lured him north from Dunedin with a cash incentive and a barman's job. He made his debut for the New Zealand national rugby league team that same year. Part of Haig's reason for the switch was the opportunity to tour Great Britain and Haig was selected for the Kiwis 1947–48 tour of his place of birth.

He was the New Zealand captain for nine Test matches between 1951 and 1954. Haig moved clubs in 1952, joining the new Marist club.

Haig returned to Otago in 1954, representing the province and again being selected for the Kiwis. He was among five of New Zealand's leading players who ruled themselves out of selection for the 1954 Rugby League World Cup and missed the tournament. He retired at the end of the year.

== Later years ==
Haig later coached the Pirates club in the Otago Rugby Union competition, where his son Barry played. He was the last New Zealand dual-code rugby international until Kurt Sherlock in 1989.

Haig died aged 71 on 28 October 1996.

The New Zealand Rugby Union presented his family with his All Blacks cap in 2009.
