= 1929 Auckland Rugby League season =

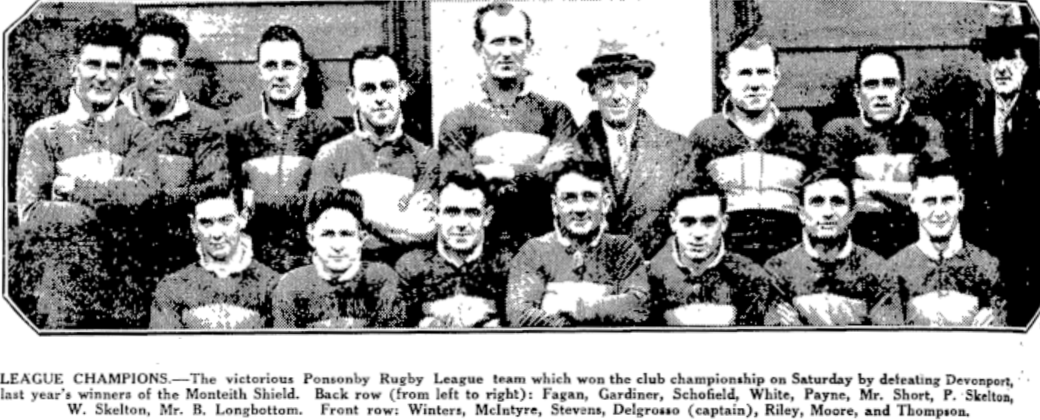

The 1929 Auckland Rugby League season was its 20th. One of the key events of the season was the tour of the South Sydney side.

The First Grade Championship was won by Ponsonby who defeated Devonport in the final 5–0. Marist won the Thistle Cup for competition points accrued during the second round of matches where they went undefeated. They also won the Roope Rooster trophy after defeating Ponsonby in the final 17–9. They weren't finished yet, defeating the same opponent to win the Stormont Shield 28–14. This was the second consecutive year that they won both of those trophies.

Richmond entered a team into the B Grade which was arguably the first ever 'reserve grade' team in Auckland club rugby league. The B Grade competition was won by Point Chevalier who defeated Otahuhu in the final 13 points to 10. This earned Point Chevalier the right to playoff with Ellerslie who had come last in the A Grade championship losing all 14 of their matches. Ellerslie won the match by 5 points to 0 to remain in A Grade for 1930. Otahuhu beat Point Chevalier 11–0 to win the Stallard Cup which had previously been a knockout competition for the B Grade, however this season a full round robin was played before the final.

Preceded by 1928	20th Auckland Rugby League season 1929	Succeeded by 1930

== Season news and summary ==
=== Club teams by grade participation ===
Team	1st	B Div.	2nd	3rd Open	3rd Int.	4th	5th	6th A	6th B	Schools	Total
Richmond Rovers	1	1	0	1	1	1	1	1	2	1	10
Devonport United	1	0	1	1	1	1	1	1	0	1	8
Kingsland Athletic	1	0	1	1	0	1	1	1	0	0	6
Ponsonby United	1	0	1	2	0	1	0	0	0	0	5
City Rovers	1	0	0	0	1	1	1	1	0	0	5
Point Chevalier	0	1	0	1	0	0	1	1	1	0	5
Marist Old Boys	1	0	0	0	0	0	1	1	1	0	4
Northcote & Birkenhead Ramblers	0	1	0	0	1	0	0	1	1	0	4
Newton Rangers	1	0	1	0	0	0	0	0	1	1	4
Ellerslie United	1	0	0	1	0	0	0	0	1	1	4
Otahuhu Rovers	0	1	0	0	0	1	0	1	0	1	4
Mount Albert United	0	0	1	0	1	1	0	0	0	1	4
Newmarket	0	0	0	0	1	0	1	1	0	1	4
Glen Lynn	0	0	0	1	1	0	0	0	1	0	3
Akarana	0	0	0	0	1	1	1	1	0	0.5	4.5
Remuera	0	0	1	0	0	1	0	0	0	0	2
Mount Wellington	0	0	1	0	0	1	0	0	0	0	2
Māngere United	0	1	0	0	0	0	0	0	0	1	2
Parnell	0	1	0	0	0	0	0	0	0	0.5	1.5
Papatoetoe	0	0	0	0	0	0	0	0	1	1	2
Onehunga Convent (St Joseph's School)	0	0	0	0	0	0	0	0	0	1	1
Total	8	6	7	8	8	10	8	10	9	11	85

=== Auckland Rugby League management ===
The annual report for the completed 1928 season revealed that £3272 was taken in gate receipts from club matches alone at Carlaw Park. The total from all matches was £4573 with £517 paid to injured players. A further £609 1s 3d was spent on maintenance and improvement at Carlaw Park. Clubs were also granted £326 18s 5d and charitable causes received £142 10s 4d. League assets including Carlaw Park were reported as £10,569 16s 4d, with a consolidated fund of £9810 11s 9d.

It was stated prior to the season that Auckland Rugby League would be concentrating much more on the club game and that no representative games would be played during it. This was in response to the 1928 season where a large representative program had been played along with the hosting of the touring England team. The Senior B competition was weakened considerably after the Kingsland team amalgamated with Grafton Athletic and moved up into the A Grade. The Senior B league was also ‘lowered in status’ with several of the stronger players moving into A grade sides.

On 23 April The New Zealand Herald published a lengthy summary of rugby league in Auckland from its beginnings in 1909 to the present day (1929).

The Otahuhu Trotting Club wrote to the Auckland Rugby League advising them that the league could make use of two playing grounds on its property on Tennessee Avenue in Mangere East.

=== New clubs and mergers ===
On 2 April a new club was formed in Papatoetoe after a meeting was held in their town hall. It was decided to field three junior teams though ultimately they only fielded one team in the 6B Grade. This was not the Papatoetoe Panthers club which was formed at a much later date.

At a meeting of the Grafton Athletic and Kingsland Rovers League Football Clubs it was decided to amalgamate and become known as Kingsland Athletic. The meeting was attended by 80 members. They decided that their colours would be a maroon jersey with a blue and gold shield. They requested to be placed in the Senior A Grade. A lengthy discussion was held at a management committee meeting before they agreed to accept the team in the A Grade. This made the number of teams in the grade 8. Their senior team was coached by former New Zealand captain Bert Avery who had been a playing member of Maritime/Grafton Athletic.

=== Rule changes ===
A rule change brought in for the beginning of the season was to make each half 40 minutes in length rather than 45 minutes. Another rule change occurred prior to round 5 with alterations to the play-the-ball rule. The idea was the prevent players from playing the ball to the side. Players had been allowed to turn their body and pass the ball from the foot to their own team. “On occasions the ball travelled but a few feet, which invariably resulted in players of both teams fighting for possessions on the ground. It must be said that too much of the game is wasted with players lying on the ball. Now it is necessary to play the ball, forwards or backwards, past the opposing player. Should it be kicked to the side, all players must stand outside the five yards limit before the ball can be handled by them”.

=== Player losses ===
An ongoing issue for club league in Auckland, and indeed New Zealand were the continuing losses of top players to English clubs. Over three seasons nine players left to join professional English sides. Wigan signed Lou Brown, Ben Davidson and Len Mason, while Wilson Hall played for Leeds, and Roy Hardgrave, Trevor Hall, and Lou Hutt all joined St. Helens. Trevor Hanlon of the Richmond club signed for Broughton Rangers club late in the season.

=== Improvements to Carlaw Park ===
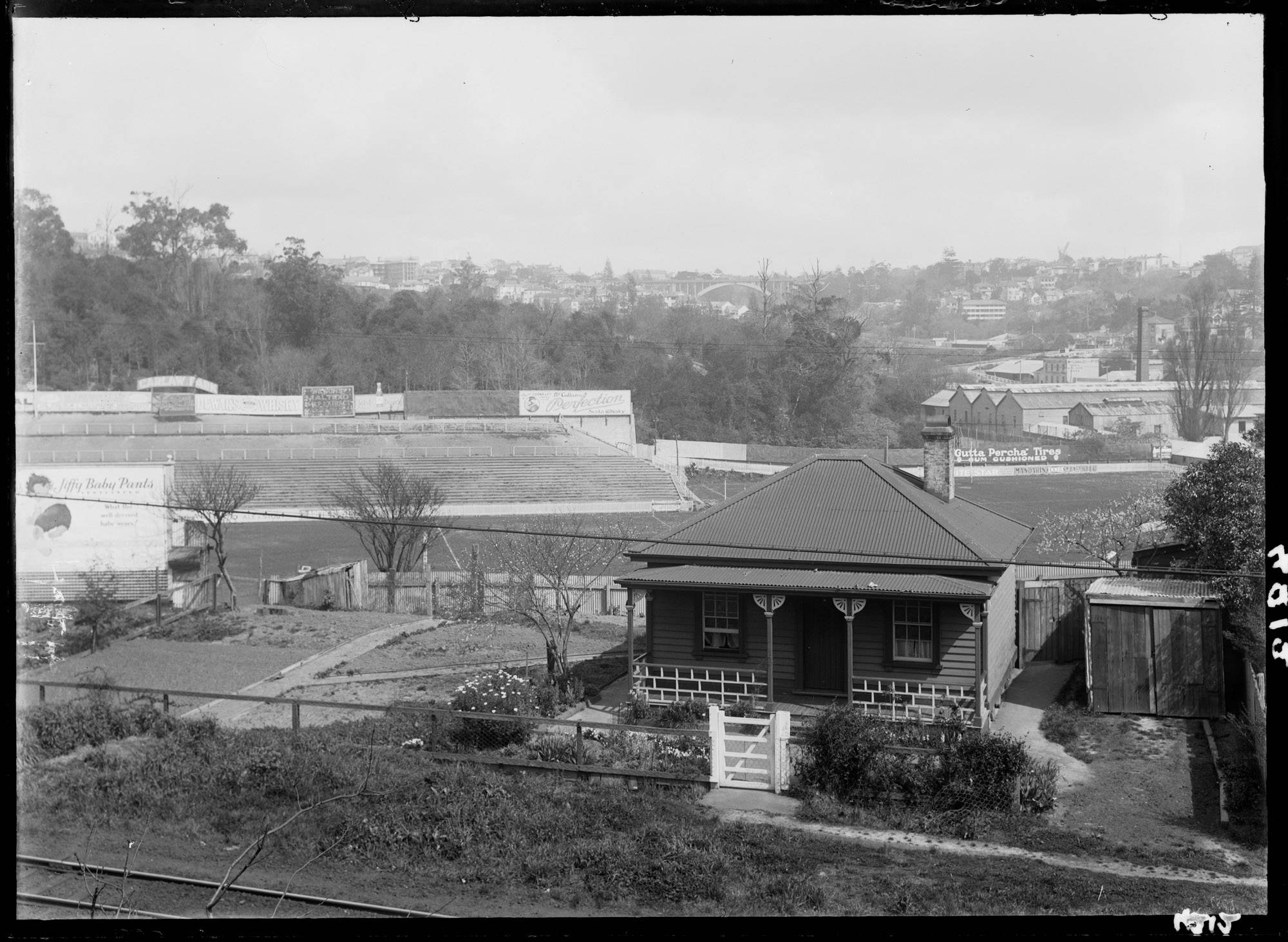
Carlaw Park from the railway line in 1929.

After a series of very wet matches played at Carlaw Park and many requests for improved changing and washing conditions the Auckland Rugby League met to discuss the matter. They planned to “increase the showers and add hot water installations”. The Devonport delegate said “his club now shared the expense of a bus, and the team went to the Tepid Baths after each match. Another delegate said that hot water provision was required for curtain-raiser and other teams, which did not desire to leave the ground”. The league decided to begin with the work and complete it by Saturday week.

On 9 October the Management Committee met regarding the improvement of accommodation at Carlaw Park. Chairman Mr. George Rhodes said that an extra stand with dressing rooms would cost £12,000 which was money that the league did not have. The existing stand was taken up with 800 vice-presidents who gained free entry and so there was little revenue to be gained by adding to this area. He did however say that they were “keen to assist players in providing better dressing rooms and offices where the League could centralise its business.

=== South Sydney tour ===
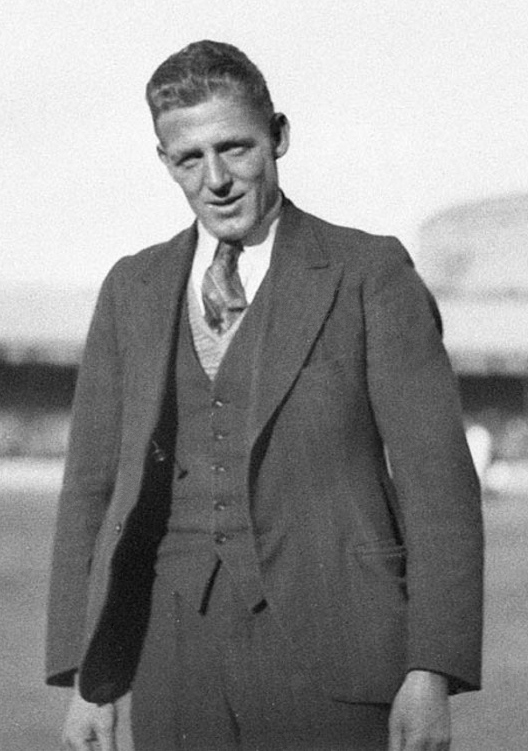
Benny Wearing who scored a try and kicked 4 goals through their two games v Marist

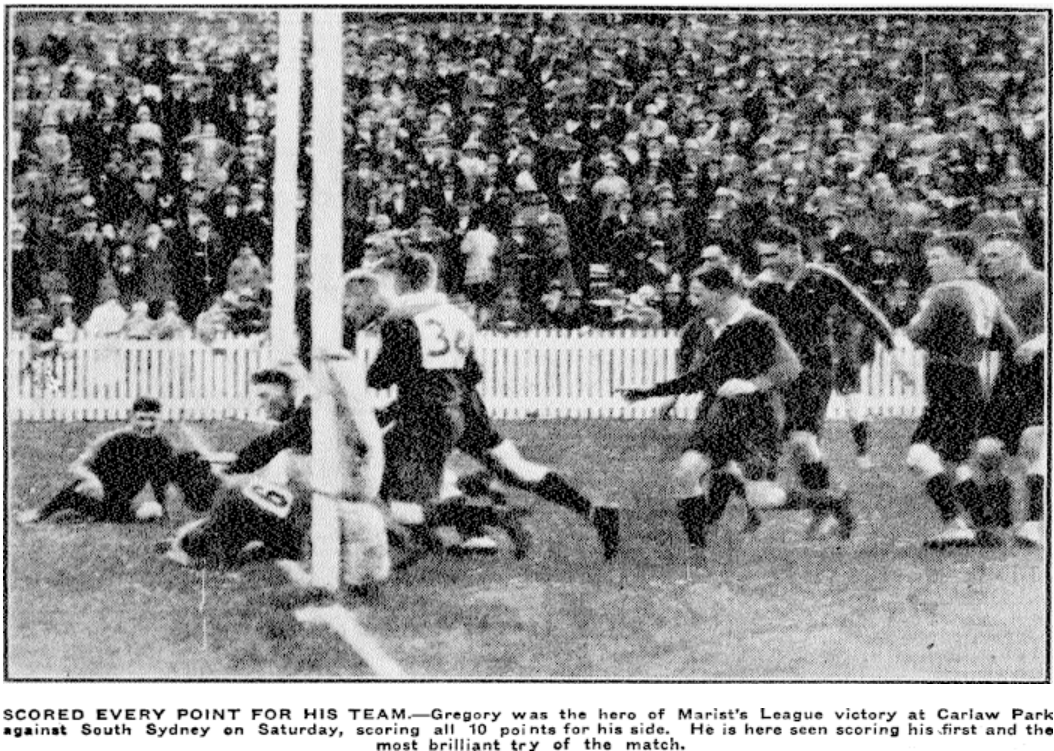
Charles Gregory scoring his first try.

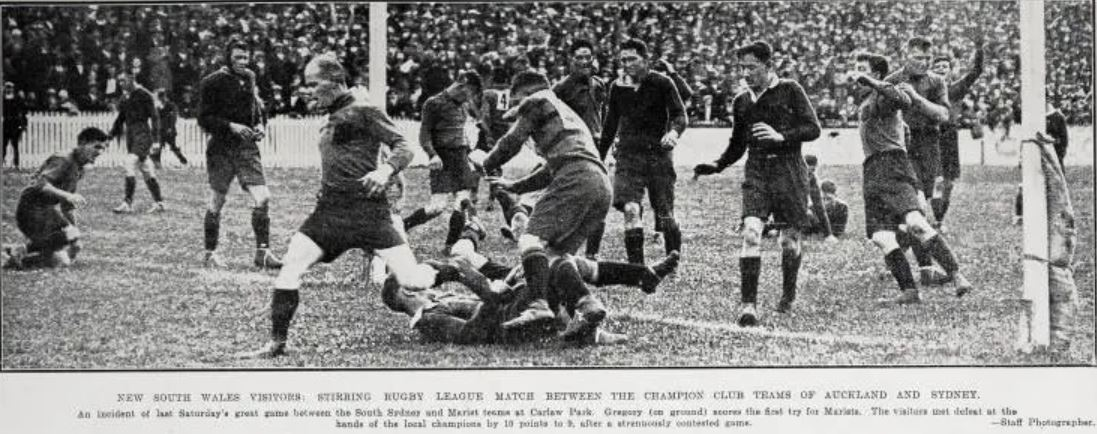
A second after the previous photo

South Sydney became the first ever Australian club to tour New Zealand. They played three matches. Two were played against Marist Old Boys at Carlaw Park on consecutive Saturdays and a midweek game was played against Huntly in Huntly. They were defeated in the first match 10–9, before winning the return match 21–5. In their loss to Marist Charles Gregory scored all the Marist points through two tries, a conversion and a penalty. For South Sydney Jack Why scored their only try in the first game against Marist, while in their second game which they won Benny Wearing, Carl Eggen, Harry Eyers, and Alf Binder all scored.

12 October	Marist	10–9	South Sydney	Carlaw Park 1
3:00	Try: Charles Gregory 2 Con: Charles Gregory; Pen: Charles Gregory		Try: Jack Why; Con: Alf Blair; Pen: Benny Wearing, Oscar Quinlivan	Attendance: 15,000; Referee: Arthur Harlock

19 October	Marist	5–21	South Sydney	Carlaw Park 1
3:00	Try: George Batchelor; Pen: Charles Gregory		Try: Benny Wearing, Carl Eggen 2, Harry Eyers, Alf Binder; Con: Benny Wearing; Pen: Benny Wearing 2	Attendance: 15,000; Referee: Les Bull

== Monteith Shield (first grade championship) ==
The Round 6 match between Richmond and Kingsland was postponed as Richmond had travelled to Hikurangi to play against the local team which was in its second season.

=== Monteith Shield standings ===
Team	Pld	W	D	L	F	A	Pts
Ponsonby United	15	12	1	2	276	116	25
Devonport United	15	11	1	3	236	113	23
City Rovers	14	9	0	5	171	153	18
Marist Old Boys	14	7	3	4	206	157	17
Newton Rangers	14	7	0	7	144	223	14
Kingsland Athletic	14	5	1	8	143	209	11
Richmond Rovers	14	3	0	11	105	161	6
Ellerslie United	14	0	0	14	86	235	0

=== Monteith Shield fixtures ===
==== Pre-season fixture ====
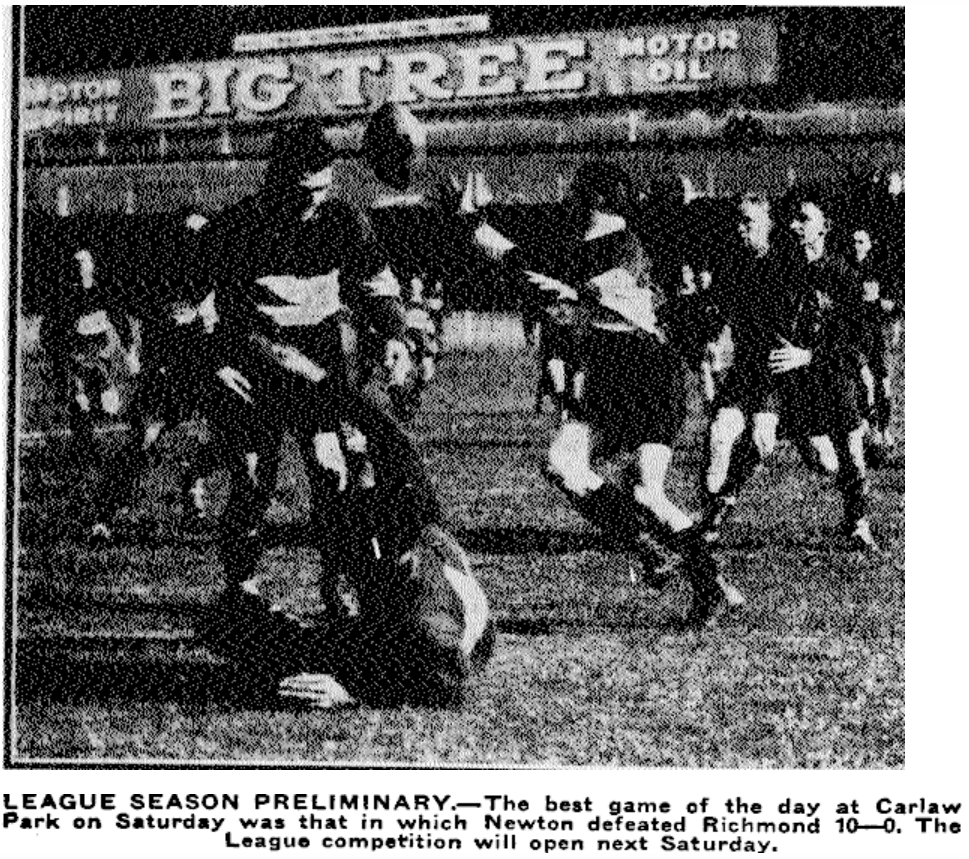
Newton v Richmond on April 22.

On April 20 several pre-season matches were played at Carlaw Park involving first grade teams and senior B sides. Newton Rangers defeated Richmond Rovers by 10 points to 0 with Roy Hardgrave scoring a try and kicking a penalty and converting W. Johnstone's try. Ellerslie United surprised Devonport United with a 5-5 draw. Marist Old Boys beat City 5-0, Kingsland Athletic beat Northcote & Birkenhead Ramblers 13-8, and Mount Wellington and Parnell played out a 0-0 draw. The senior B teams involved were Kingsland-Athletic, Parnell, Mount Wellington, and Northcote.

==== Round 1 ====
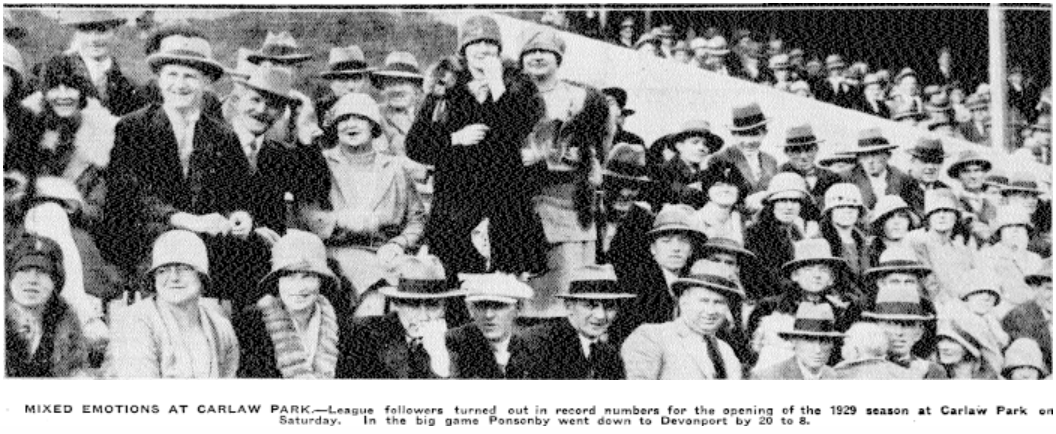
Crowd at the opening round during the Devonport v Ponsonby match.

During the season Craddock Dufty who had starred for Auckland and New Zealand for several seasons fell out with the Newton club and asked for a transfer to Ellerslie. The Management Committee eventually granted the transfer.In the match between Newton and Marist Roy Hardgrave was concussed and had to leave the field. G Rhodes was also concussed later in the match and was taken to the hospital. For City in their match with Kingsland, William McLaughlin broke his nose and had to leave for treatment. Cyril Brimble had moved to Newton from the Manukau rugby club. Cyril moved to Canterbury where he played representative for that province and then after moving to Wellington did the same there before his untimely death in his 40s after a vehicle accident. His younger brother Ted Brimble would follow in the following season to Newton. And then in 1935 younger brother Wilfred would also join the ranks of Newton. Another brother Walter played for Manukau league club and all three (Walter, Ted, and Wilfred), would all go on to represent New Zealand.

27 April	Devonport	20–8	Ponsonby	Carlaw Park 1
3:00	Try: Coughlan, Len Scott, J Beattie, Ernest Ruby; Con: Alf Scott 3 Pen: Allan Seagar		Try: Schofield, Cyril Thompson; Con: Frank Delgrosso	Attendance: 5,000; Referee: Les Bull

27 April	Newton	21–20	Marist	Carlaw Park 2
3:00	Try: M Little 2, Cyril Brimble 2, Stanley Francis; Con: Roy Hardgrave, C Rhodes; Pen: Butterworth		Try: Jim O'Brien, Jock Graham 2, D Duane; Con: Owen Cronin 2, George Batchelor; Pen: George Batchelor	Attendance: 5,000; Referee: Percy Rogers

27 April	City	21–6	Kingsland	Carlaw Park 1
1:45	Try: James Everson 2, C Reynolds 2, J L Cocks; Con: Laurie Barchard 3		Try: Angelo, Claude List	Attendance: 5,000; Referee: T Chernside

27 April	Ellerslie	8–22	Richmond	Ellerslie Reserve
3:00	Try: Ivan Littlewood, Hubert Crewther; Pen: Ivan Littlewood		Try: Colebrook, McKinnon 2, Ted Mincham, Coote 2 Con: Ted Mincham, Trevor Hanlon	Referee: A McKubrey

==== Round 2 ====
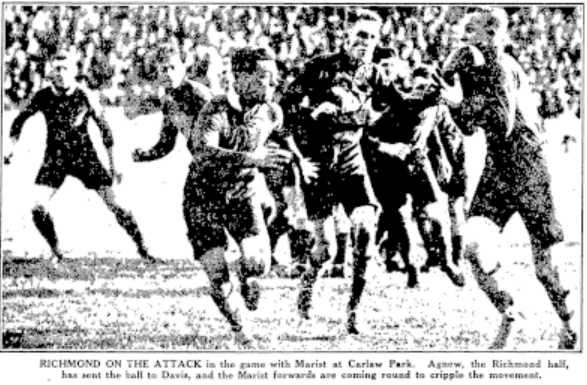

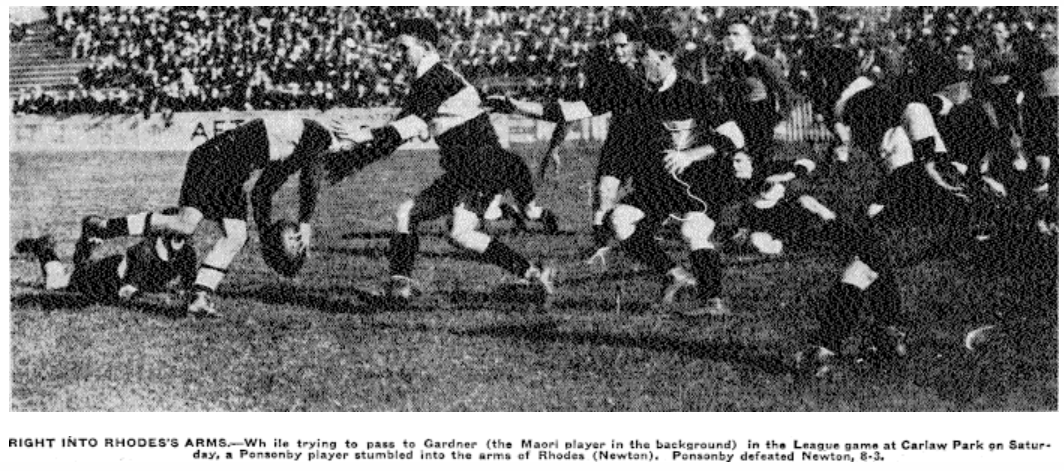

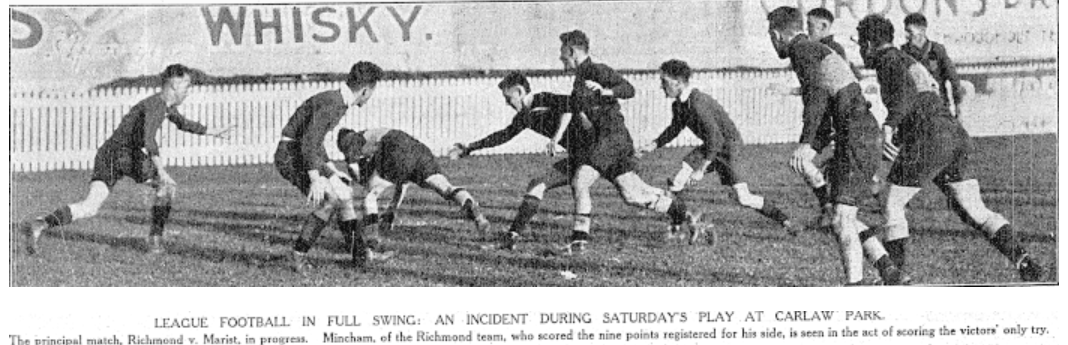

The game between Ponsonby and Newton was the 50th time the teams had met in senior games. Following this game Ponsonby had won 30, Newton 18, with 2 draws.

4 May	Richmond	9–8	Marist	Carlaw Park 1
3:00	Try: Ted Mincham; Con: Ted Mincham; Pen: Ted Mincham 2		Try: Dick Moisley; Con: Charles Gregory; Pen: Charles Gregory	Referee: Les Bull

4 May	Ponsonby	8–3	Newton	Carlaw Park 1
1:45	Try: Winters; Con: Frank Delgrosso; Pen: Frank Delgrosso		Try: Roy Hardgrave	Referee: Percy Rogers

4 May	City	11–8	Ellerslie	Carlaw Park 2
3:00	Try: Joe Hadley, Lawrence, George Perry; Con: Laurie Barchard		Try: Bob Crewther, Hobbs; Pen: J Hemingway	Referee: Vic Simpson

4 May	Devonport	29–7	Kingsland	Devonport Domain
3:00	Try: Trevor O'Leary 2, Stanley Rule 2, Alf Scott, S Casey, C Rhodes; Con: Alf Scott 2, Ernest Ruby, J Beattie		Try: Angelo; Con: Frank Herring; Pen: Frank Herring	Referee: A McKubrey

==== Round 3 ====
11 May	Ponsonby	14–10	Marist	Carlaw Park 1
3:00	Try: Bert Payne, Cyril Thompson; Con: Frank Delgrosso 2 Pen: Frank Delgrosso		Try: Monty McDonald, Phil Brady; Con: Alan Clarke 2	Attendance: 5,000; Referee: Percy Rogers

11 May	City	15–12	Richmond	Carlaw Park 2
3:00	Try: Frank Townsend, George Perry, C Reynolds; Con: Laurie Barchard, Wilson Hall; Pen: Laurie Barchard		Try: Ted Mincham, McKinnon; Pen: Ted Mincham, Joseph Hamilton 2	Attendance: 5,000; Referee: Bertie Emirali

11 May	Newton	12–10	Kingsland	Auckland Domain 2
3:00	Try: Roy Hardgrave, Hammond; Con: Cyril Brimble; Pen: Cyril Brimble 2		Try: Ralph Longville, Robert Carter; Con: Ralph Longville; Pen: Ralph Longville	Referee: Freeman Thompson

11 May	Ellerslie	12–16	Devonport	Ellerslie Reserve
3:00	Try: Ivan Littlewood, Johnson; Con: J Hemingway; Pen: J Hemingway 2		Try: P Masefield, McCarthy, J Beattie, Len Scott; Con: Allan Seagar 2	Referee: T Chernside

==== Round 4 ====
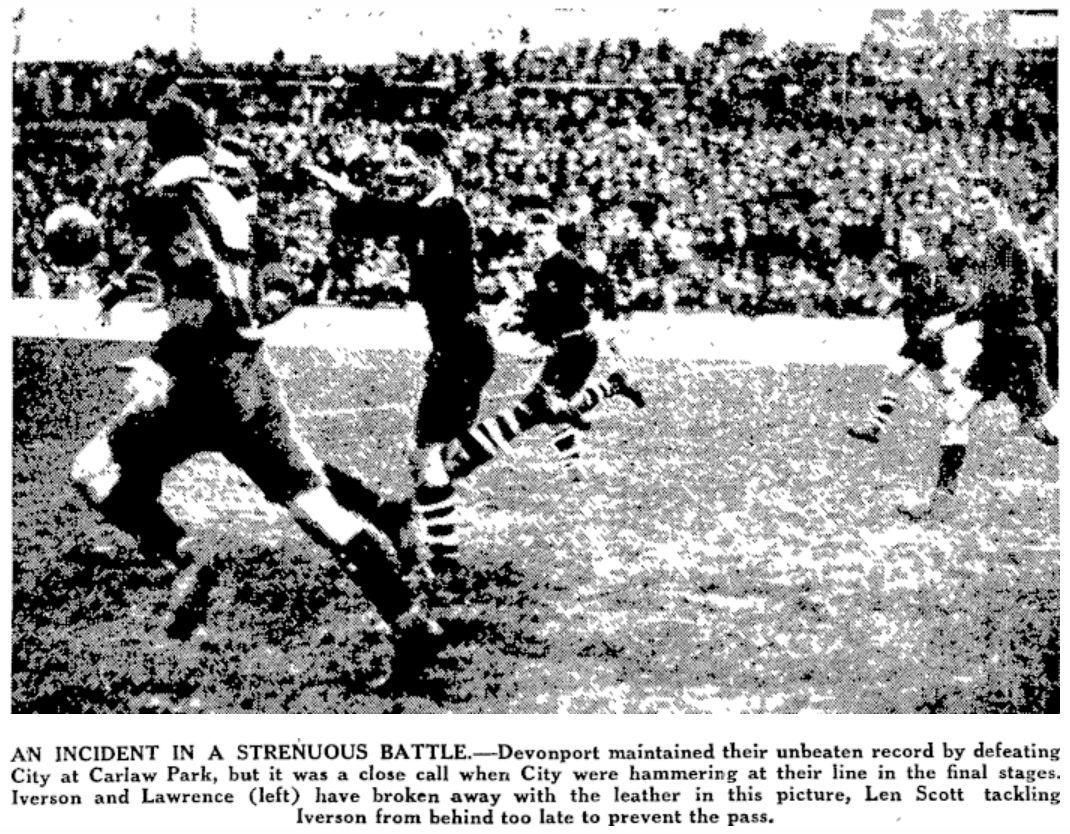

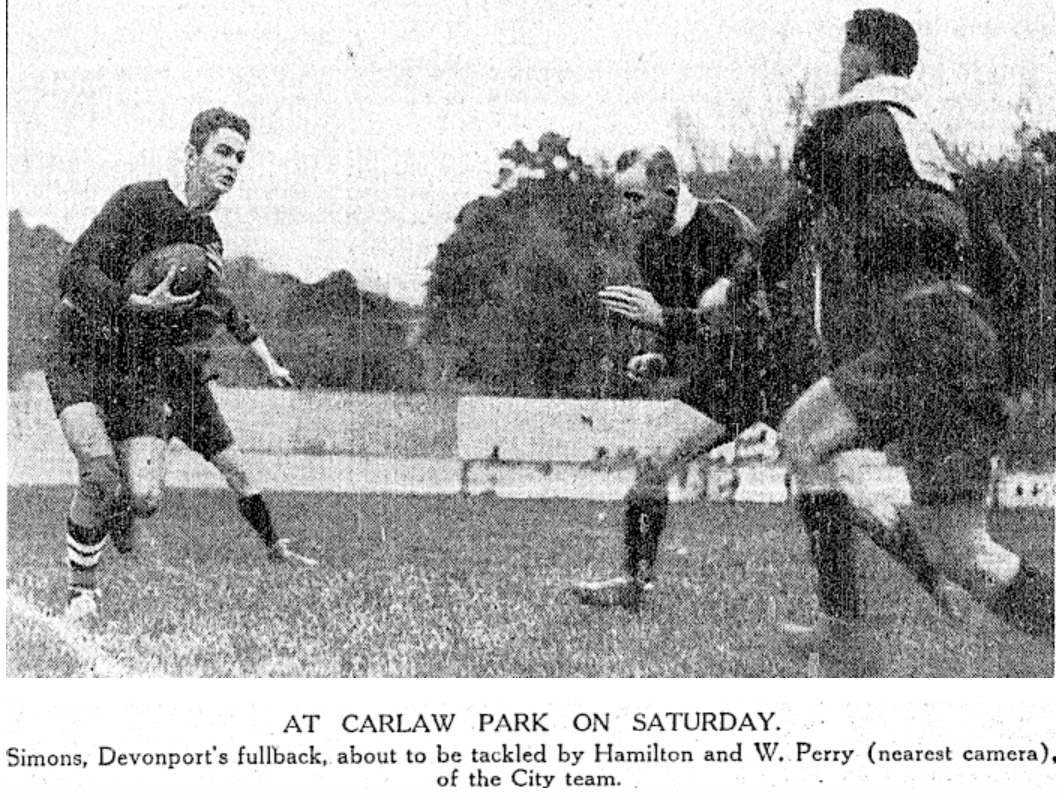

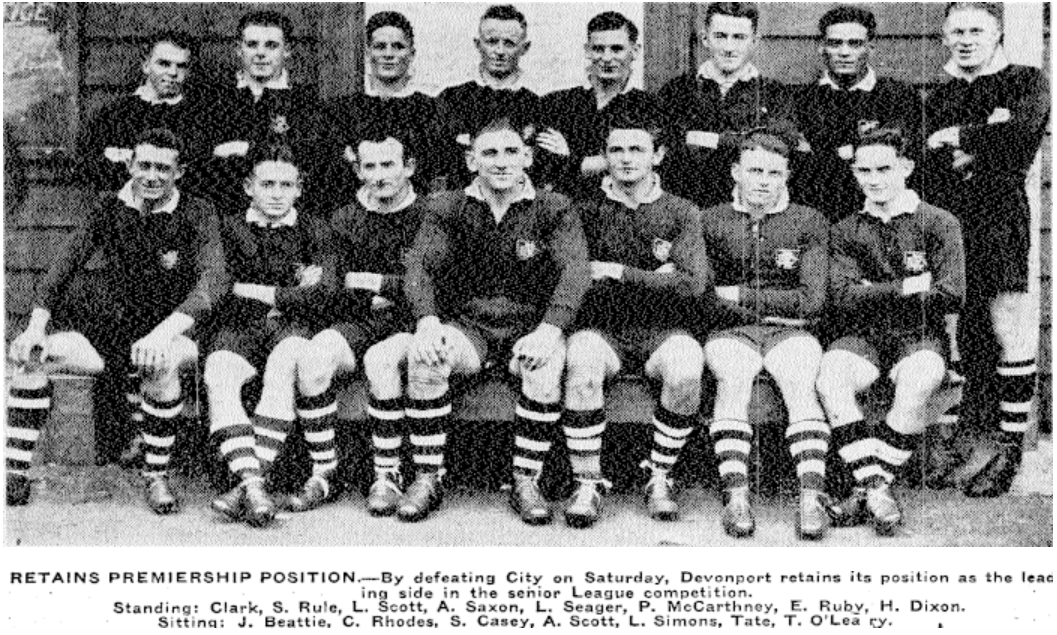

Puti Tipene Watene debuted for City after transferring from the Manukau rugby union club and kicked two penalties. He went on to play for them until 1935 before moving to the Manukau club and represented New Zealand from 1930 to 1937. Watene later became an MP for the Labour Party from 1963 to 1967 when he died of a heart attack during a meeting. His great grandson is Dallin Watene-Zelezniak.

18 May	Devonport	8–4	City	Carlaw Park 1
3:00	Try: Len Scott 2 Pen: Alf Scott		Pen: Steve Watene 2	Attendance: 10,000; Referee: Les Bull

18 May	Ponsonby	15–10	Richmond	Carlaw Park 1
1:45	Try: A McIntyre 3 Con: Frank Delgrosso 2 Pen: Frank Delgrosso		Try: Bill Davis; Con: Ted Mincham 2 Pen: Joseph Hamilton	Attendance: 10,000; Referee: A McKubrey

18 May	Newton	15–7	Ellerslie	Carlaw Park 2
3:00	Try: Roy Hardgrave 2, Cyril Brimble; Con: Craddock Dufty; Pen: Craddock Dufty; Drop: Craddock Dufty		Try: Ivan Littlewood; Con: Ivan Littlewood; Pen: J Hemingway	Attendance: 10,000; Referee: G McGowatt

18 May	Marist	18–18	Kingsland	Carlaw Park 2
1:45	Try: Norm Campbell, Jock Graham 2, Wilf Hassan; Con: Norm Campbell, H Hickey; Pen: Norm Campbell		Try: Bob Carter 2, Longfield, McLaughlin; Con: Longfield 2 Pen: Longfield	Attendance: 10,000; Referee: T Chernside

==== Round 5 ====
The Devonport win over Richmond was their 100th first grade win in their 20th consecutive year in first grade. To this point they had a 100 win, 12 draw, and 85 loss record. Bill Davis, the Richmond halfback was unavailable after being in a car accident after their game the previous Saturday which hospitalised him.

25 May	Devonport	15–7	Richmond	Carlaw Park 1
3:00	Try: Trevor O'Leary 2, C Rhodes; Con: Lindsay Simons 2 Pen: Lindsay Simons		Try: Trevor Hanlon; Pen: Ted Mincham 2	Attendance: 10,000; Referee: T Chernside

25 May	Newton	17–12	City	Carlaw Park 1
1:45	Try: Roy Hardgrave, M Little, Rhodes; Con: Craddock Dufty 3 Pen: Craddock Dufty		Try: Steve Watene, C Reynolds; Con: Steve Watene; Pen: Steve Watene 2	Attendance: 10,000; Referee: Les Bull

25 May	Ponsonby	41–10	Kingsland	Carlaw Park 2
3:00	Try: Lou Hutt, Winters, Schofield 2, Bert Payne, Dooley Moore, A McIntyre 2, Cyril Thompson; Con: Frank Delgrosso 6 Pen: Frank Delgrosso		Try: Robert Carter, Ralph Longville; Con: Ralph Longville	Attendance: 10,000; Referee: Bertie Emirali

25 May	Marist	19–16	Ellerslie	Carlaw Park 2
1:45	Try: Phil Brady 4, George Batchelor; Con: Norm Campbell; Pen: Alan Clarke		Try: Cook, Chapman, Leslie Olliff; Con: Cook, Leslie Olliff	Attendance: 10,000; Referee: Arthur Rae

==== Round 6 ====
Alan Clarke was sent off in the Marist v City game for questioning the referee. Richmond's game against Kingsland was postponed as many members of the club were travelling to Hikurangi in Northland to play in a seven a side tournament there. The Richmond senior team won the final 8-5 over the local Hikurangi side. Patrick McCarthy was unable to play in the Devonport forwards as he had a boxing match at the Auckland Town Hall the same night.

1 June	Devonport	24–9	Newton	Carlaw Park 1
3:00	Try: Alf Scott, J Beattie 2, Trevor O'Leary, Allan Seagar, Les O'Leary; Con: Lindsay Simons, Allan Seagar 2		Try: Stanley Francis; Pen: Craddock Dufty 3	Attendance: 7,000; Referee: Percy Rogers

1 June	Ponsonby	24–5	Ellerslie	Carlaw Park 1
1:45	Try: A McIntyre, Lou Hutt, Winters, Cyril Thompson; Con: Frank Delgrosso 4 Pen: Frank Delgrosso 2		Try: Leslie Olliff; Con: Leslie Olliff	Attendance: 7,000; Referee: T Hill

1 June	City	5–3	Marist	Carlaw Park 2
3:00	Try: James Everson; Con: Laurie Barchard		Try: H Hickey	Attendance: 7,000; Referee: A McKubrey

1 June	Richmond	PPD	Kingsland

==== Round 7 ====
In the match between Marist and Devonport both Courtney (Marist) and Ernest Ruby (Devonport) were sent off for fighting late in the match. For Newton Craddock Dufty refused to play in protest against the non-selection of Wally Somers. As a result Newton cancelled his registration with the club. Somers also decided to retire at this point though he ultimately joined the Ellerslie team for the 1930 season where Dufty moved to. Dufty then signed with Ellerslie where he had moved to earlier in the year. Cook was sent off in Ellerslie’s match for arguing with a referring decision.

8 June	Ponsonby	37–11	City	Carlaw Park 1
3:00	Try: Winters, Schofield 3, Frank Delgrosso, Lou Hutt, Leonard Riley 2, Cyril Thompson; Con: Frank Delgrosso 4 Pen: Frank Delgrosso		Try: William McLaughlin, Bill Hamilton, Lawrie Barchard; Con: William McLaughlin	Attendance: 8,000; Referee: Bertie Emirali

8 June	Marist	13–13 (13-2)	Devonport	Carlaw Park 1
1:45	Try: Charles Gregory, Jim Johnson, Phil Brady; Con: Charles Gregory 2		Try: Ernest Ruby; Con: Lindsay Simons; Pen: Lindsay Simons 4	Attendance: 8,000; Referee: Percy Rogers

8 June	Newton	13–10	Richmond	Carlaw Park 2
3:00	Try: Trevor Hall, Roy Hardgrave, Page; Con: Roy Hardgrave 2		Try: Coote 2 Con: Joe Hamilton; Pen: Joe Hamilton	Attendance: 8,000; Referee: Vic Simpson

8 June	Kingsland	17–5	Ellerslie	Carlaw Park 2
1:45	Try: Bob Carter, Claude List 2 Con: Ralph Longville 2 Pen: Ralph Longville 2		Try: Cooke; Con: Selby Crewther	Attendance: 8,000; Referee: Arthur Rae

==== Round 8 ====
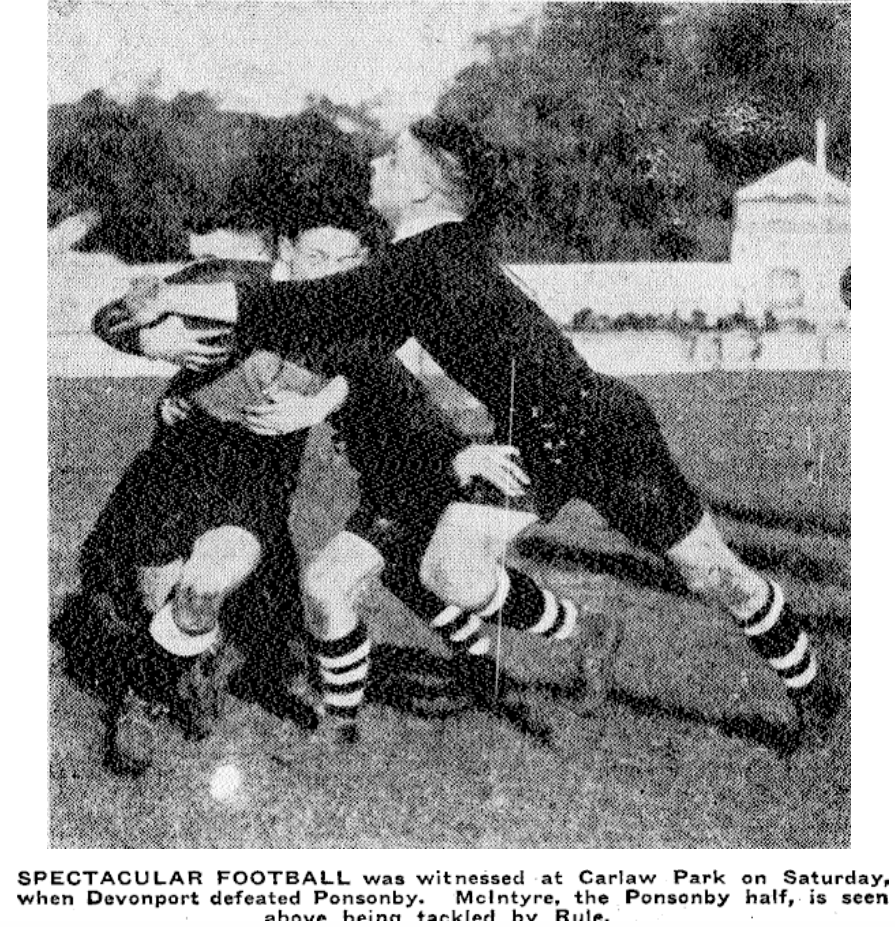

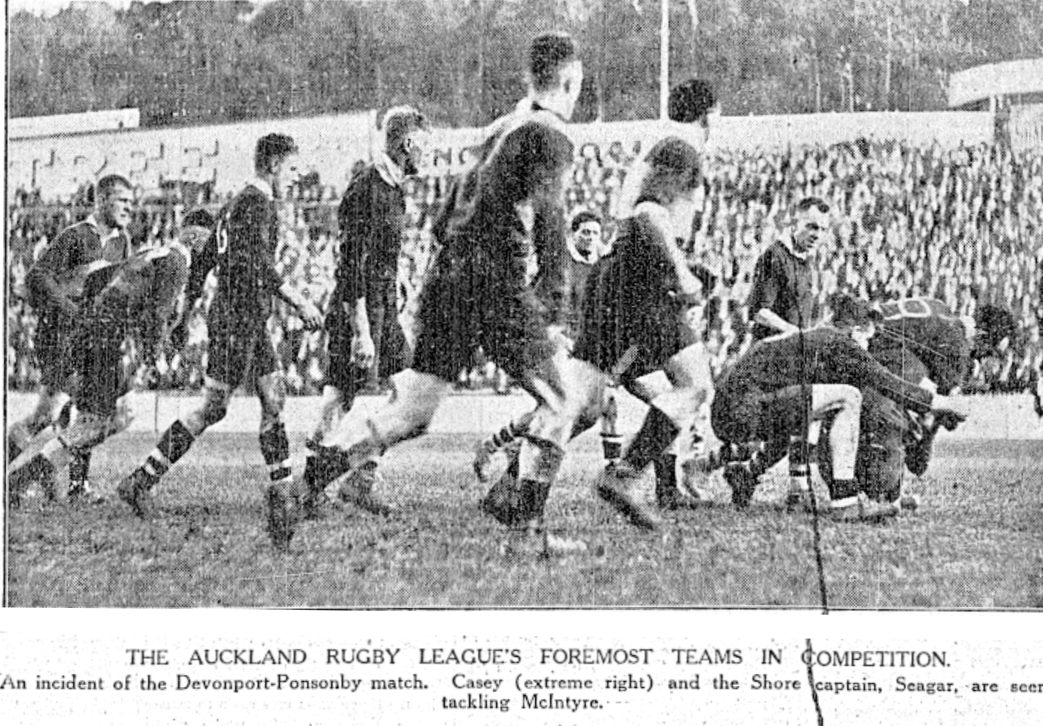

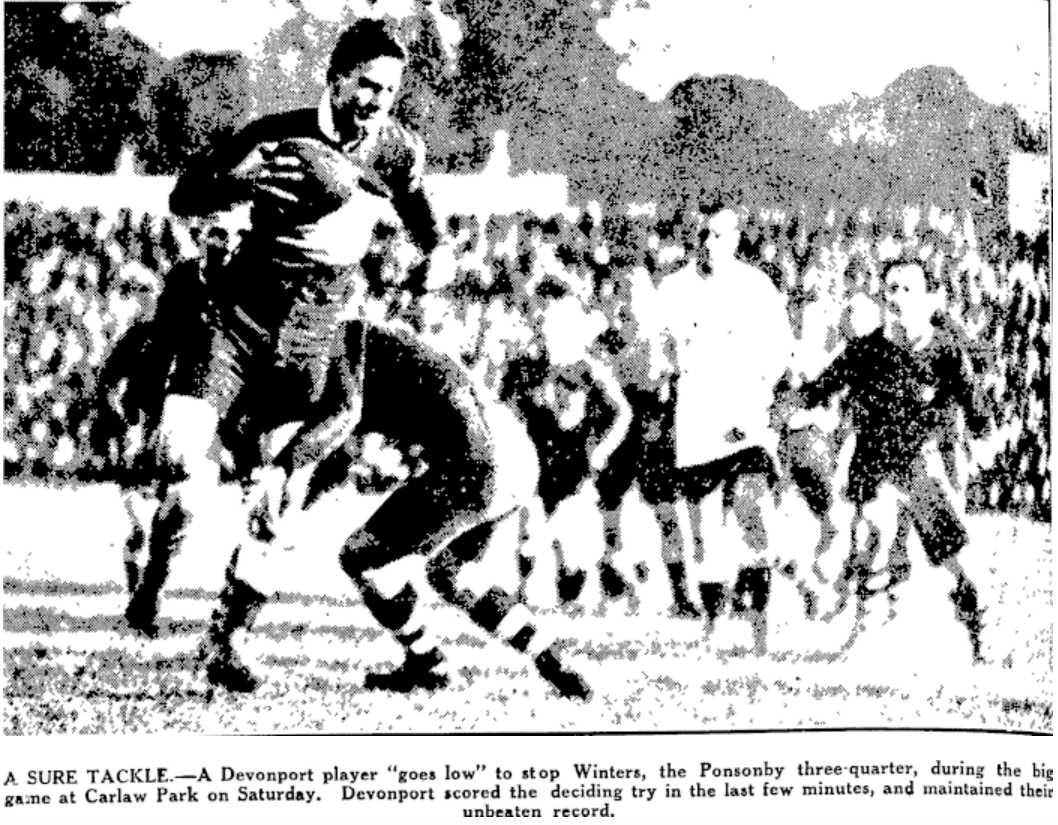

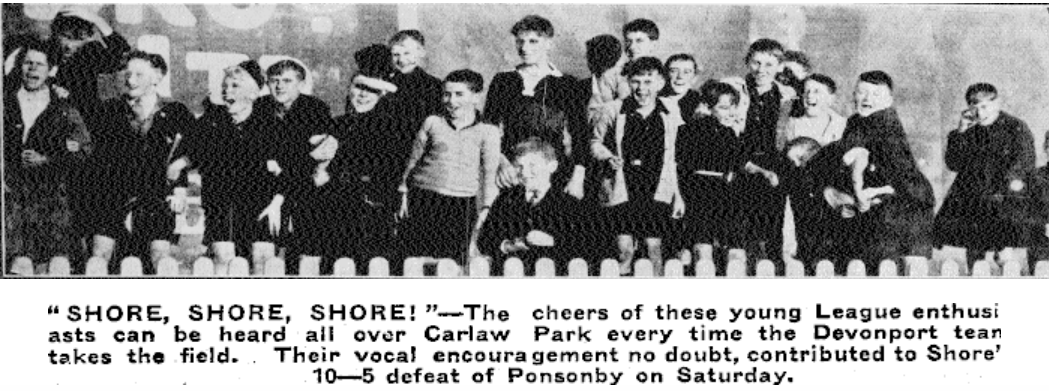

15 June	Devonport	10–5	Ponsonby	Carlaw Park 1
3:00	Try: S Casey, Patrick McCarthy; Con: Allan Seagar 2		Try: Lou Hutt; Con: Frank Delgrosso	Attendance: 12,000; Referee: Les Bull

15 June	City	13–8	Kingsland	Carlaw Park 1
1:30	Try: Joe Hadley, George Perry 2 Con: Steve Watene 2		Try: Herbert Ramm, Claude List; Con: Ralph Longville	Attendance: 12,000; Referee: Billy Mincham

15 June	Marist	20–19	Newton	Carlaw Park 2
3:00	Try: Phil Brady, McDonald 2, Jim Johnson; Con: Norm Campbell 3 Pen: Norm Campbell		Try: C Rhodes, Roy Hardgrave 2, Trevor Hall, Cyril Brimble; Con: Roy Hardgrave; Pen: Cyril Brimble	Attendance: 12,000; Referee: A McKubrey

15 June	Richmond	10–5	Ellerslie	Carlaw Park 2
1:30	Try: Ralph Jenkinson, Ted Mincham; Pen: Joseph Hamilton, Ted Mincham		Try: Hobbs; Pen: Craddock Dufty	Attendance: 12,000; Referee: Wilfred Simpson

==== Round 9 ====
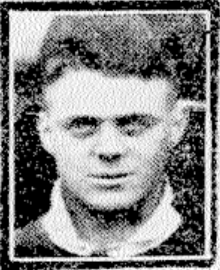
Roy Hardgrave

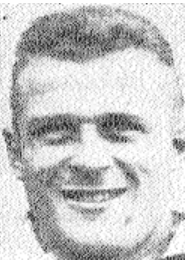
Lou Hutt

During the week Roy Hardgrave of Newton signed with the St Helens club in England as did Lou Hutt of Ponsonby. Hardgrave scored Newton's only points in their heavy loss to Hutt's Ponsonby's side. Hardgrave had played for New Zealand against England on their 1928 tour as did Hutt. Hardgrave would play 5 seasons with St Helens, playing 212 games, scoring 173 tries before returning to New Zealand and then signing with York and later Toulouse before returning to New Zealand for good where he finished his career at Mt Albert and later coaching Newton. Lou Hutt played 2 seasons for St Helens before returning to New Zealand and carrying on his career at Ponsonby before a final season in 1936 with Newton.

22 June	Ponsonby	42–3	Newton	Carlaw Park 1
3:00	Try: Cyril Thompson, Frank Delgrosso 2, Winters, Schofield 2, A McIntyre 2, Bill Skelton 2 Con: Frank Delgrosso 4, George Gardiner 2		Try: Roy Hardgrave	Referee: Vic Simpson

22 June	Devonport	19–8	Kingsland	Carlaw Park 2
3:00	Try: Les O'Leary 3, Ernest Ruby, Trevor O'Leary; Con: Allan Seagar 2		Try: Robert Carter, Harold Christmas; Pen: Railey	Referee: G McCowatt

22 June	Richmond	9–11	Marist	Grey Lynn Park
3:00	Try: Ralph Jenkinson; Pen: Ted Mincham 3		Try: H Hickey, Jim O'Brien, Bulcraig; Pen: Norm Campbell	Attendance: 600; Referee: Bertie Emirali

22 June	Ellerslie	0–10	City	Ellerslie Reserve
3:00			Try: George Perry, Laurie Barchard; Con: Laurie Barchard 2	Referee: Percy Rogers

==== Round 10 ====
29 June	Ponsonby	10–10	Marist	Carlaw Park 1
3:00	Try: A McIntyre, Leonard Riley; Con: George Gardiner; Pen: George Gardiner		Try: Jock Graham, Jim Johnson; Con: Charles Gregory; Pen: Charles Gregory	Referee: Percy Rogers

29 June	City	24–0	Richmond	Carlaw Park 2
3:00	Try: George Perry, Laurie Barchard 2, William McLaughlin, Joe Hadley, James Everson; Con: Puti Tipene Watene 3			Referee: Les Bull

29 June	Kingsland	14–10	Newton	Auckland Domain
3:00	Try: Robert Carter, G Simms 2, McLaughlan; Con: Railey		Try: Ken Peckham, Ferguson; Con: Cyril Brimble 2	Referee: Bertie Emirali

29 June	Devonport	19–5	Ellerslie	Devonport Domain
3:00	Try: Len Scott 2, Allan Seagar, Stanley Rule, Les O'Leary; Con: Lindsay Simons 2		Try: Robert Crewther; Con: Leslie Olliff	Referee: G McCowatt

==== Round 11 ====
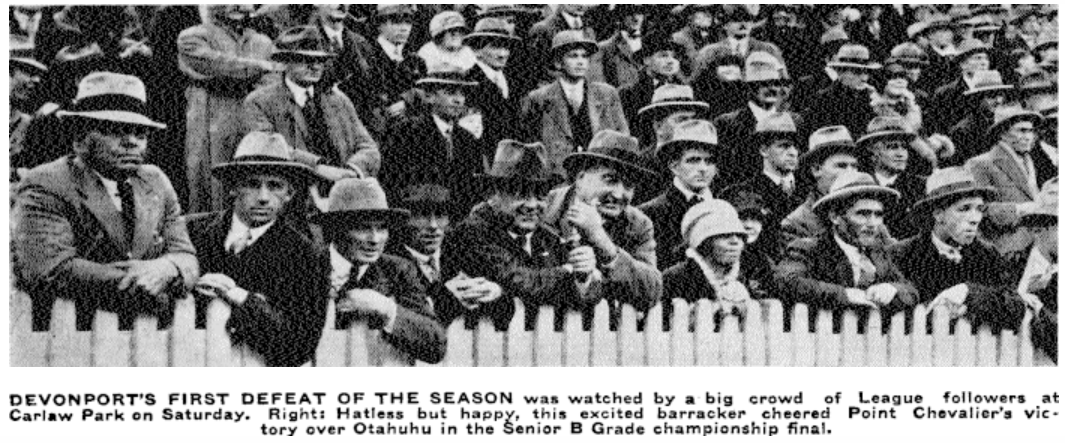

Another large crowd of 10,000 was in attendance at the Carlaw Park matches. City secured an upset 17-8 win over competition leaders Devonport. For the Devonport side veteran forward Ernest Ruby broke his nose in a collision. George Perry for City played at outstanding game at five eighths for City in their win. Ray Lawless made his debut in the forward pack for Richmond as a promoted junior but did not become a regular in the senior side for 2 more season. Lou Brown was in attendance, back in New Zealand for a break before returning to England to continue playing for Wigan. He was said to be impressed with the City performance. Hector Cole made a rare performance for Ponsonby, replacing Cyril Thompson at five eighth. He had only played 3 games in 1927 and 4 in 1928 following his 15 appearances for New Zealand on their 1926-27 tour of England. The team was short in the backline and he was asked to play having had no training but played well.

6 July	City	17–8	Devonport	Carlaw Park 1
3:00	Try: Laurie Barchard 2, William McLaughlin, Norman Pascoe, George Perry; Con: Laurie Barchard		Try: Les O'Leary, Len Scott; Con: Alf Scott	Attendance: 10,000; Referee: Vic Simpson

6 July	Ponsonby	21–16	Richmond	Carlaw Park 2
3:00	Try: Winters 2, Schofield, Leonard Riley, Bert Payne; Con: Frank Delgrosso 3		Try: Ted Mincham, Bill Davis, Stan Prentice, Arthur Lennie; Con: Ted Mincham 2	Attendance: 10,000; Referee: Bert Emirali

6 July	Marist	25–10	Kingsland	Auckland Domain 1
3:00	Try: Jim Johnson, George Batchelor, McDonald 2, Phil Brady; Con: Charles Gregory 4 Pen: Charles Gregory		Try: Claude List, Robert Carter; Pen: Ralph Longville 2	Referee: William Mincham

6 July	Ellerslie	5–7	Newton	Ellerslie Reserve
3:00	Try: Tooman; Con: Craddock Dufty		Try: M Little; Con: Ken Peckham; Pen: Ken Peckham	Referee: Stuart Billman

==== Round 12 ====
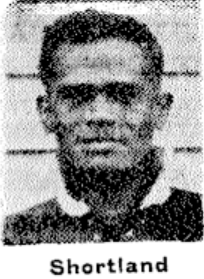
William Shortland who had joined the City seniors.

William Shortland, an ex-Maori All Black transferred to City Rovers and made his debut for them. He had previously represented North Auckland at the halfback position. Shortland was said to have played a “sterling game, demonstrating that the thirteen-a-side code suited his particular type of play”. He went on to play for them until the end of the 1930 season and played 21 games. Pat Skelton also transferred from rugby where he had been playing five eighth for the Grammar Old Boys club. He joined the Ponsonby side and scored a try on debut and also set up their second try for Bill Skelton (no relation). Bill played 35 games from 1929 to 1932, while Pat played 29 games and scored 20 tries, and kicked 8 goals and 3 drop goals from 1929 to the start of the 1932 season when he left the club. Their match was originally scheduled to be played on the number one field as a curtain-raiser but was transferred to the number two field as the former was in a poor condition however the number two ground “soon became a sea of mud”. The Marist and Ellerslie match at the Auckland Domain was postponed as the field was deemed unfit for play. The condition of Carlaw Park was so bad that it was discussed at the management committee meeting later in the week and it was decided that conditions needed to be improved for players immediately.

13 July	Devonport	14–0	Richmond	Carlaw Park 1
3:00	Try: Len Scott, Patrick McCarthy 2, J Beattie; Con: Lindsay Simons			Referee: Les Bull

13 July	City	16–6	Newton	Carlaw Park 2
3:00	Try: William Perry, C Reynolds, Joe Hadley, George Perry; Con: Lawrie Barchard; Pen: Lawrie Barchard		Try: George Cammick, Stanley Francis	Referee: Wilfred Simpson

13 July	Ponsonby	9–0	Kingsland	Carlaw Park 2
1:30	Try: Pat Skelton, George Gardiner, Bill Skelton			Referee: Vic Simpson

13 July	Marist	Abandoned	Ellerslie	Auckland Domain 2
3:00				Referee: Stuart Billman

==== Round 13 ====
The Minister of Education, Hon. Harry Atmore was present at the Carlaw Park games. In Newton's loss to Devonport their forward Ferguson collided with the goalpost in trying to tackle S Casey as he scored and was taken off with a suspected broken rib. A good crowd gathered at Ellerslie Reserve to watch the local team play Ponsonby on a heavy ground. At Devonport the Newton side arrived with just nine players but managed to use some lower grade players to increase their numbers. They had lost the services of ex-internationals Craddock Dufty, Wally Somers, Trevor Hall, and Roy Hardgrave in recent weeks. Devonport almost took pity on them towards the end of the game and declined to take the conversion attempt to one of their tries. R.D. Revell transferred from Ponsonby to Kingsland during the week and debuted for his new side in their win over Richmond.

20 July	Marist	13–7	City	Carlaw Park 1
3:00	Try: Jock Graham, Dick Moisley, Phil Brady; Con: Charles Gregory 2		Try: William McLaughlin; Con: Puti Tipene Watene; Pen: Puti Tipene Watene	Referee: Percy Rogers

20 July	Devonport	35–3	Newton	Devonport Domain
3:00	Try: J Beattie 2, C Rhodes, Len Scott 2, Stanley Rule, Allan Seagar, S Casey 2, Con: Lindsay Simons 4		Try: McLeod	Referee: Stuart Billman

20 July	Kingsland	6–0	Richmond	Auckland Domain 2
3:00	Try: Claude List, H Christmas			Referee: Wilfred Simpson

20 July	Ellerslie	3–20	Ponsonby	Ellerslie Reserve
3:00	Try: Grogan		Try: Dooley Moore 2, Bill Skelton, Victor Fagan, Pat Skelton, George Gardiner; Con: Frank Delgrosso	Referee: W Weston

==== Round 14 ====
Trevor Hanlon, who had played fullback for Richmond since 1924 was signed by Broughton Rangers in England. He was due to depart on the Ruahine on August 21. He played 21 games for Broughton in the 1929-30 season scoring 4 tries. He ended up not being selected in their senior side at all the following season and fell on hard times in England needing financial assistance from Auckland rugby league to return home the following season. Richmond was held scoreless for the third consecutive match. The match at Mt Wellington was the first ever senior match played there making it the 23rd venue for senior rugby league matches in Auckland since 1908.

3 August	Marist	10–6	Devonport	Carlaw Park 2
3:00	Try: Phil Brady, Jim Johnson; Con: Charles Gregory 2		Try: J Beattie 2	Referee: Les Bull

3 August	Ponsonby	17–5	City	Carlaw Park 1
1:30	Try: Pat Skelton 2, Cyril Thompson; Con: Frank Delgrosso 2 Pen: Frank Delgrosso 2		Try: George Perry; Con: Laurie Barchard	Referee: Bert Emirali

3 August	Newton	6–0	Richmond	Auckland Domain 2
3:00	Try: M Little 2			Referee: Arthur Rae

3 August	Kingsland	19–7	Ellerslie	Mt Wellington (Westfield)
3:00	Try: N York 3, Angelo, G Simms; Con: E Lucas; Drop: Claude List		Try: Robert Crewther; Con: Hemingway; Pen: Hemingway	Referee: Stuart Billman

==== Postponed round 12 match ====
With their win at the Auckland Domain, Marist won the Thistle Cup which was awarded to the team with the best record in the second round of the championship. Aside from that trophy the game was of no real consequence and there was talk of not playing it but Ellerslie turned out with several juniors. They competed quite well in the first half but in the second half were getting routed before the match was ended early. Dick Moisley who generally played in the forwards turned out at fullback for them with Hec Brisbane and Charles Gregory partnered in the five eighths, outside halfback Wilf Hassan. Ellerslie fielded new players Scott at fullback and brought up their third grade hooker, Arthur, to compete with future New Zealand hooker, Gordon Campbell. He was said to have performed well under the circumstances.

10 August	Marist	26–0	Ellerslie	Auckland Domain
2:00	Try: McDonald 2, Charles Gregory, Jim Johnson, Wilf Hassan 2 Con: Charles Gregory 4			Referee: Bert Emirali

==== Postponed round 6 match ====
The Round 6 match which was postponed saw Richmond default to Kingsland.

10 August	Kingsland	WBD-LBD	Richmond	Carlaw Park 2
3:30				Referee: Arthur Rae

==== Championship Final ====
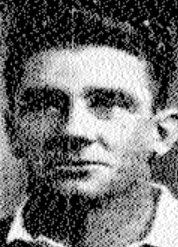
Frank Delgrosso

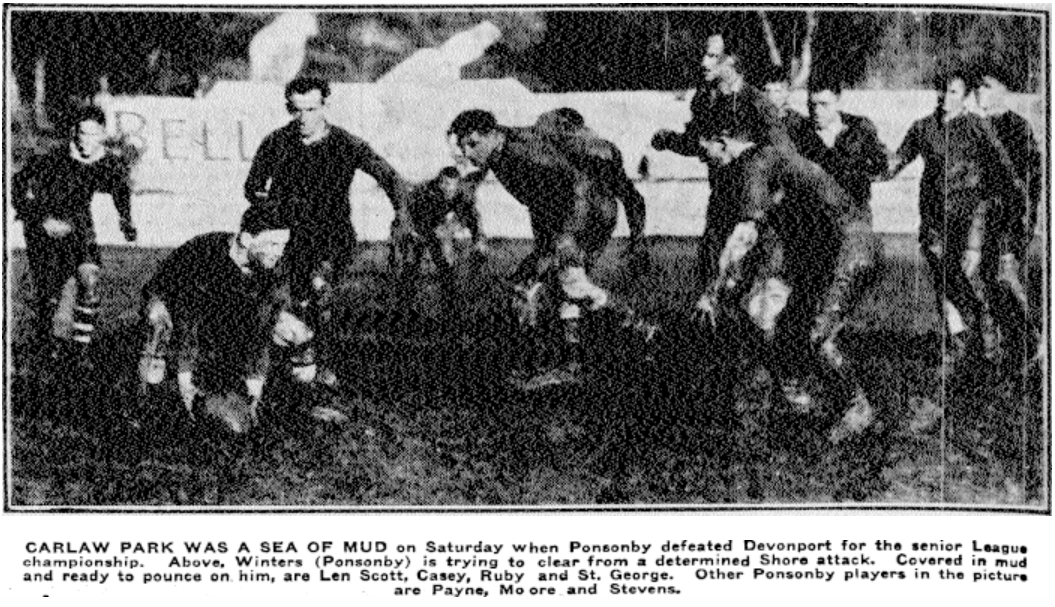

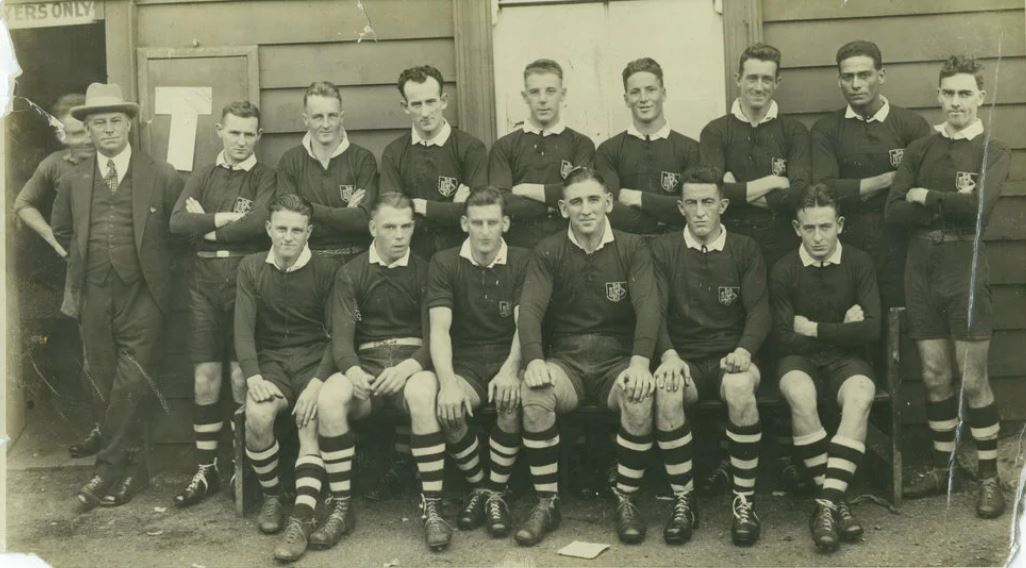
Devonport United

An enormous crowd of 11,000 turned out to watch the final. Typically the championship was decided without the need for a final but with the teams level one was required to find the winner. It was played in sunshine and intermittent rain but the players were in ankle deep mud. Frank Delgrosso captained the Ponsonby side from first five eighth to their fifth championship. Devonport had been seeking to go back to back after winning the 1928 title which was their third. George Gardiner played a strong game for the winners and scored their only try.

10 August	Ponsonby	5–0	Devonport	Carlaw Park 1
3:00	Try: George Gardiner; Pen: Frank Delgrosso			Attendance: 11,000; Referee: Les Bull

=== Roope Rooster knockout competition ===
Marist won the Roope Rooster for the second consecutive year after defeating Ponsonby 17–9 in the final.

==== Round 1 ====
Arnold Berridge joined Richmond after transferring from rugby where he had been an Auckland representative player. Berridge played 16 games for Auckland from 1927 to 1929 and then moved back to rugby union the following season and played 12 more times for Auckland from 1930 to 1933. He kicked 4 penalties on debut against Devonport in a 17–12 victory. For Richmond, the 28 year old representative soccer player Albert Whowell also took the field and basically said that he didn't know much about the league game but said he'd "give it a fly". In the match between Ponsonby and Newton, Harvey White (the Ponsonby fullback) had to leave the field with a broken collarbone early in the second half and was taken to Auckland Hospital by Ambulance. Hammond then left the field with an injured neck and went to hospital and Ken Peckham followed him soon after, also injured and needing to go to hospital. At the end of the match the well known Ponsonby forward Dooley Moore dislocated his knee. Ken Peckham's brother Tim Peckham debuted for Richmond when he came on for Agnew before halftime who was injured. Puti Tipene Watene arrived late for City's game with Ellerslie but came on after quarter of an hour to play in their back line bringing their number to 13. The match was being played at the Westfield abattoir ground of the newly formed Mount Wellington side after they requested a fixture be played there. City won 18 to 9. A player named Smith was promoted for Devonport from their juniors to play at fullback and was said to have struggled. It was most likely this was 18 year old Dick Smith who (officially) debuted for their senior side two years later and would go on to represent New Zealand.

31 August	Marist	9–3	Kingsland	Carlaw Park 1
3:00	Try: Hec Brisbane, Phil Brady, George Batchelor		Try: Lou Wilson	Referee: Wilfred Simpson

31 August	Richmond	17–12	Devonport	Carlaw Park 2
3:00	Try: Patterson 2, George Surtees; Pen: Arnold Berridge 4		Try: Les O'Leary, Allan Seagar; Con: Allan Seagar 2 Pen: Allan Seagar	Referee: K Menzies

31 August	Ponsonby	31–24	Newton	Carlaw Park 2
3:00	Try: Pat Skelton 2, Bill Skelton, George Gardiner, Schofield, Dooley Moore, A McIntyre; Con: Frank Delgrosso 4		Try: M Little, Hill, Stanley Francis 2, Cyril Brimble, Arthur Mansill; Con: Kenneth Peckham 2	Referee: Arthur Rae

31 August	City	18–9	Ellerslie	Mt Wellington
3:00	Try: Stan Clark, Laurie Barchard, George Perry, James Everson; Con: Laurie Barchard 3		Try: Robert Crewther; Con: Hemingway; Pen: Hemingway, Craddock Dufty	Referee: Stuart Billman

==== Semi final ====
For Marist, their winger McDonald scored one of their five tries. He was an ex-Poverty Bay rugby representative. City rallied well to tie the scores at 7-7 before Marist ran away with it. George Batchelor the Marist winger scored a spectacular try from halfway rounding several City backs and then swerved infield to score under the posts. For City, Joe Hadley went off with a sprained ankle and then 25 year old William Shortland, a well known Māori rugby player from Northland who had joined the side during the year was concussed and left the field. He was taken to Auckland Hospital by ambulance but his condition was not serious. For Marist Wilf Hassan at halfback played very well. As well as going on to represent New Zealand he became the two time New Zealand diving champion in the early 1930's.

14 September	Marist	23–7	City	Carlaw Park 1
3:15	Try: Phil Brady, McDonald, Jim O'Brien, George Batchelor, Jock Graham; Con: Charles Gregory 2, Jim O'Brien; Pen: Charles Gregory		Try: Joe Hadley; Pen: Steve Watene; Drop: William McLaughlin	Referee: Les Bull

14 September	Ponsonby	23–0	Richmond	Carlaw Park 1
2:00	Try: Pat Skelton, Winters, A McIntyre, Leonard Riley, Schofield; Con: Pat Skelton, Frank Delgrosso, Dooley Moore; Pen: Frank Delgrosso			Referee: Vic Simpson

==== Final ====
It was charity day at Carlaw Park and despite there being other attractions on a significant crowd of 7,000 turned up at Carlaw Park for the Roope Rooster final. Marist won their second consecutive Roope Rooster trophy following their 1928 win which was their first. Their current and future internationals Charles Gregory, Jim O'Brien, Alan Clarke, Wilf Hassan scored their tries along with centre Phil Brady. Ponsonby scored three unconverted tries in response. After George Gardiner scored early in the second half Frank Delgrosso missed and easy conversion and then Ponsonby winger Scholfield scored to level the scores with Pat Skelton missing the conversion to give them the lead. Marist then retook the lead with a try to Alan Clarke with Wilf Hassan rounding things off with another try. Of the eight tries scored only one conversion was landed. Delgrosso was said to have played an uncharacteristically poor game at fullback after being injured early in the game. Towards the end he transferred up to the five eighths. Also late in the game tempers began to flare between the teams and Dooley Moore, the versatile Ponsonby player, today at halfback, was said to have pulled H Duane around and when Duane retaliated by throwing punches Duane was sent off.

21 September	Marist	17–9	Ponsonby	Carlaw Park 1
3:00	Try: Charles Gregory, Jim O'Brien, Phil Brady, Alan Clarke, Wilf Hassan; Con: Jim O'Brien		Try: Winters, George Gardiner, Schofield	Attendance: 7,000; Referee: Percy Rogers

=== Stormont Memorial Shield ===
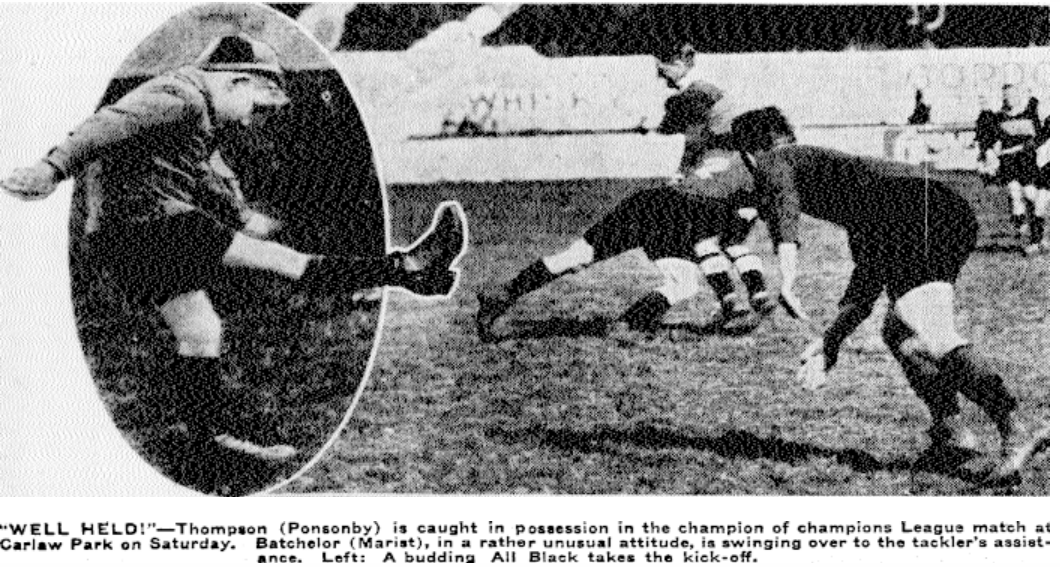
George Batchelor who scored 4 tries in the foreground heading towards the tackle where a team mate is taking down Ponsonby player Cyril Thompson.

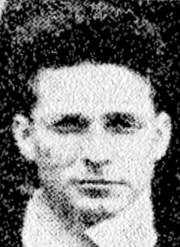
Charles Gregory

Frank Delgrosso the Ponsonby captain went off in the second half with an injured knee which he had suffered the previous week in their Roope Rooster final loss. He was replaced in the position by Dooley Moore who left the forward pack. When Charles Gregory saw that Moore had moved to the position he repeatedly kicked deep and Moore struggled to get to the ball. George Batchelor the Marist winger scored four tries, one of which was a penalty try after he was held back by Winters. In this era such tries were awarded to the obstructed player. A McIntyre, the Ponsonby halfback injured his ankle and required treatment after the game. Marist also suffered from injuries and regular players Hec Brisbane, Jock Graham, and Dick Moisley all were unavailable. The only Ponsonby player who had been unavailable was Bill Skelton through injury. Jim Johnson made a return to the Marist forward pack after an absence and he was joined by Fleet, a Ponsonby rugby senior who had played 6 games for them during the year.

28 September	Marist	28–14	Ponsonby	Carlaw Park 1
3:00	Try: Jim Johnson, George Batchelor 4, Norm Campbell; Con: Charles Gregory 3, George Batchelor; Pen: Charles Gregory		Try: A McIntyre, Skelton; Con: Skelton, George Gardiner; Pen: George Gardiner 2	Attendance: 9,000; Referee: Vic Simpson

=== Top try scorers and point scorers ===
Top try and point scorers for A Division, Roope Rooster and Stormont Shield matches. Phil Brady of Marist Old Boys (Saints) was the top try scorer with 13 closely followed by A. Schofield and A.S. McIntyre of Ponsonby who both scored 12.

Top try scorers
Rk	Player	Team	Gms	Tries
1	Phil Brady	Marist	16	13
2=	A Schofield	Ponsonby	17	12
2=	A.S. McIntyre	Ponsonby	13	12
4=	George Perry	City	13	10
4=	Len Scott	Devonport	16	10
6=	L Winters	Ponsonby	19	9
6=	Roy Hardgrave	Newton	9	9
6=	J Beattie	Devonport	13	9
6=	George Batchelor	Marist	17	8
10=	Robert Carter	Kingsland	10	8
10=	Monty McDonald	Marist	14	8
10=	Pat Skelton	Ponsonby	8	8

Top point scorers
Rk	Player	Team	G	T	C	P	DG	Pts
1	Frank Delgrosso	Ponsonby	18	3	36	11	0	103
2	Charles Gregory	Marist	11	3	21	5	0	61
3	Laurie Barchard	City	16	6	14	1	0	48
4	Ted Mincham	Richmond	15	5	6	9	0	45
5	Phil Brady	Marist	16	13	0	0	0	39
6=	A Schofield	Ponsonby	17	12	0	0	0	36
6=	Allan Seagar	Devonport	15	4	10	2	0	36
6=	A.S. McIntyre	Ponsonby	13	12	0	0	0	36
9=	Roy Hardgrave	Newton	9	9	4	0	0	35
9=	Ralph Longville	Kingsland	10	3	7	6	0	35

== B grade standings and results ==
The Round 5 match between Northcote and Māngere resulted in a win to the former team but the actual score was not stated. The standings include the final played between Ōtāhuhu and Point Chevalier, won by the latter by 13 points to 10.

Team	Pld	W	D	L	F	A	Pts
Point Chevalier	11	9	1	1	108	61	19
Otahuhu Rovers	11	8	1	2	223	44	17
Northcote & Birkenhead Ramblers	9	5	0	4	66	77	10
Richmond Rovers B	9	4	0	5	89	87	8
Parnell	10	2	0	8	112	145	4
Māngere United	10	1	0	9	50	232	0

=== Senior B grade fixtures ===
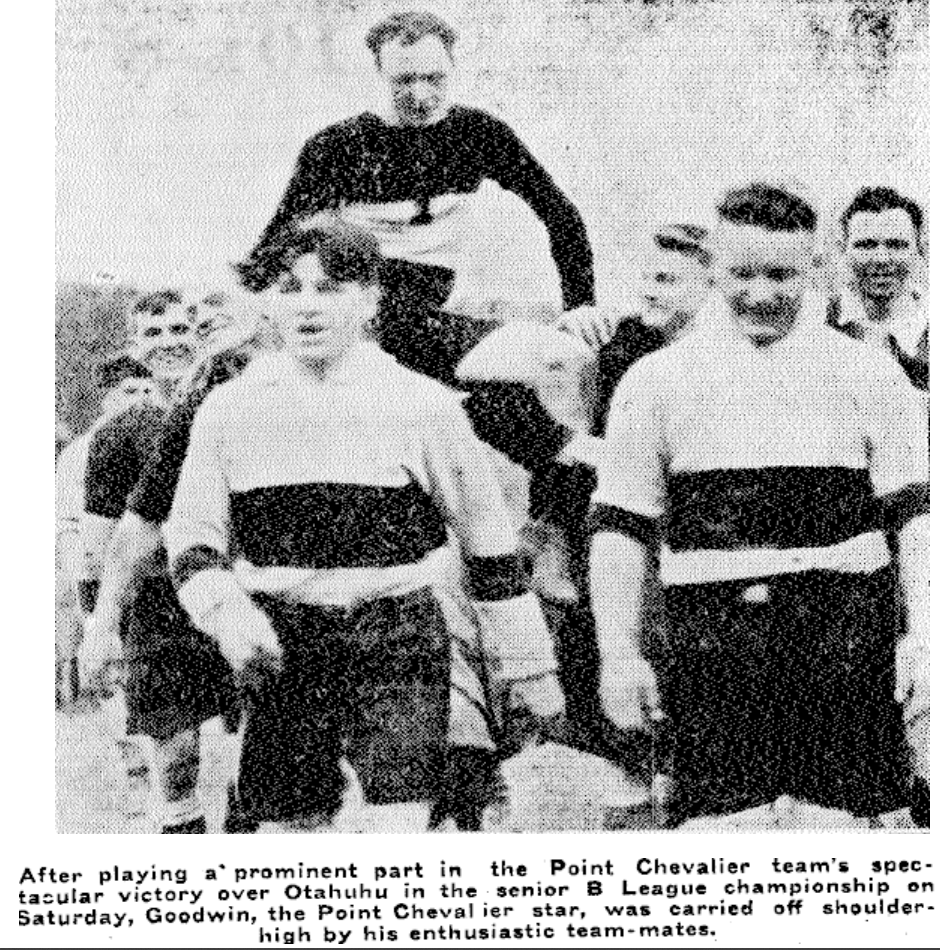
Point Chevalier player, Goodwin, being carried from the field after their final victory.

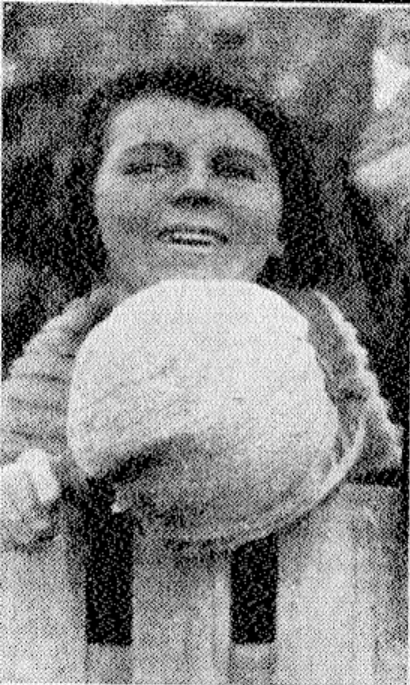
A Point Chevalier supporter at their 13-10 final victory over Ōtāhuhu at Carlaw Park on July 6.

In the first round of the season Māngere began their match with Ōtāhuhu with just ten players, though had reached thirteen near halftime. It was the first time league had been played on the newly acquired Māngere Domain.

On 8 May at the Management Committee meeting Northcote requested that the opening round match in the Senior B competition be awarded to them on account of Richmond B defaulting. However the league said that the match would be replayed at the end of the season if it would affect the outcome of the competition.

The Round 8 match between Otahuhu and Point Chevalier was held at Papatoetoe at the Papatoetoe Recreation Ground which was the first senior match played in the area. Around 1,000 spectators turned up to watch the match. Otahuhu won a close fought match 10–6.

After Round 10 was completed the Auckland Rugby League decided that the match between Point Chevalier and Otahuhu would decide the championship. The match was played on Carlaw Park and saw Point Chevalier win by 13 points to 10.

1929 Senior B Grade Results
	Date		Score		Score	Venue	
Round 1	28 April	Point Chevalier	11	Parnell	10	Carlaw Park # 1, 1:45pm	
–	28 April	Mangere	0	Otahuhu	48	Mangere Domain, 3pm	
Round 2	4 May	Otahuhu	20	Richmond B	7	Carlaw Park # 2, 1:45pm	
–	4 May	Mangere	6	Parnell	29	Mangere, 3pm	
–	4 May	Point Chevalier	10	Northcote	3	Point Chevalier, 3pm	
Round 3	11 May	Northcote	11	Parnell	2	Victoria Park, 3pm	
–	11 May	Point Chevalier	5	Otahuhu	5	Point Chevalier # 2, 3pm	
–	11 May	Mangere	0	Richmond B	32	Mangere, 3pm	
Round 4	18 May	Northcote	3	Otahuhu	2	Northcote, 3pm	
–	18 May	Point Chevalier	14	Mangere	6	Point Chevalier, 3pm	
–	18 May	Richmond B	13	Parnell	10	Grey Lynn, 3pm	
Round 5	25 May	Richmond B	0	Point Chevalier	6	Grey Lynn, 3pm	
–	25 May	Otahuhu	22	Parnell	0	Mangere, 2pm	
–	25 May	Mangere	L	Northcote	W	Mangere, 3:15pm	
Round 6	1 June	Richmond B	19	Northcote	11	Carlaw Park # 2, 1:45pm	
–	1 June	Point Chevalier	10	Parnell	7	Point Chevalier, 3pm	
–	1 June	Otahuhu	40	Mangere	0	Sturgess Park, Otahuhu, 3pm	
Round 7	8 June	Otahuhu	13	Richmond B	0	Otahuhu Reserve, 3pm	
–	8 June	Parnell	33	Mangere	14	Auckland Domain #2, 3pm	
–	8 June	Northcote	5	Point Chevalier	8	Stafford Park, Northcote, 3pm	
Round 8	15 June	Otahuhu	10	Point Chevalier	6	Papatoetoe Recreation Ground, Papatoetoe 3pm	1,000
–	15 June	Richmond B	8	Mangere	13	Grey Lynn, 3pm	
–	15 June	Northcote	16	Parnell	10	Victoria Park, 3pm	
Round 9	22 June	Otahuhu	21	Northcote	5	Otahuhu, 3pm	
–	22 June	Mangere	5	Point Chevalier	17	Mangere, 3pm	
–	22 June	Richmond B	10	Parnell	6	Point Chevalier # 2, 3pm	
Round 10	29 June	Point Chevalier	8	Richmond B	0	Point Chevalier, 3pm	
–	29 June	Northcote	11	Mangere	6	Northcote, 3pm	
–	29 June	Otahuhu	32	Parnell	5	Papatoetoe, 3pm	
Final	6 July	Point Chevalier	13	Otahuhu	10	Carlaw Park # 1, 1:30pm	

=== Senior A/Senior B promotion-relegation match ===
Ellerslie had come last in the A Grade for the second year in a row. Though unlike the previous season where they had won 3 matches in 1929 they were winless after battling injuries and the loss of players. However they managed to defeat Point Chevalier, who had won the B Grade by 5 points to 0 and thus remain in the A Grade for the 1930 season. McPherson, a forward for Point Chevalier suffered a leg injury with an artery said to be severed but he was later discharged from Auckland Hospital. For Ellerslie Craddock Dufty played his first game for about a month and kicked a penalty. The only try of the game was scored by Ellerslie's Arthur.

24 August	Ellerslie	5–0	Point Chevalier	Carlaw Park
1:30	Try: Arthur; Pen: Craddock Dufty			Attendance: 10,000; Referee: Percy Rogers

=== Stallard Cup competition ===
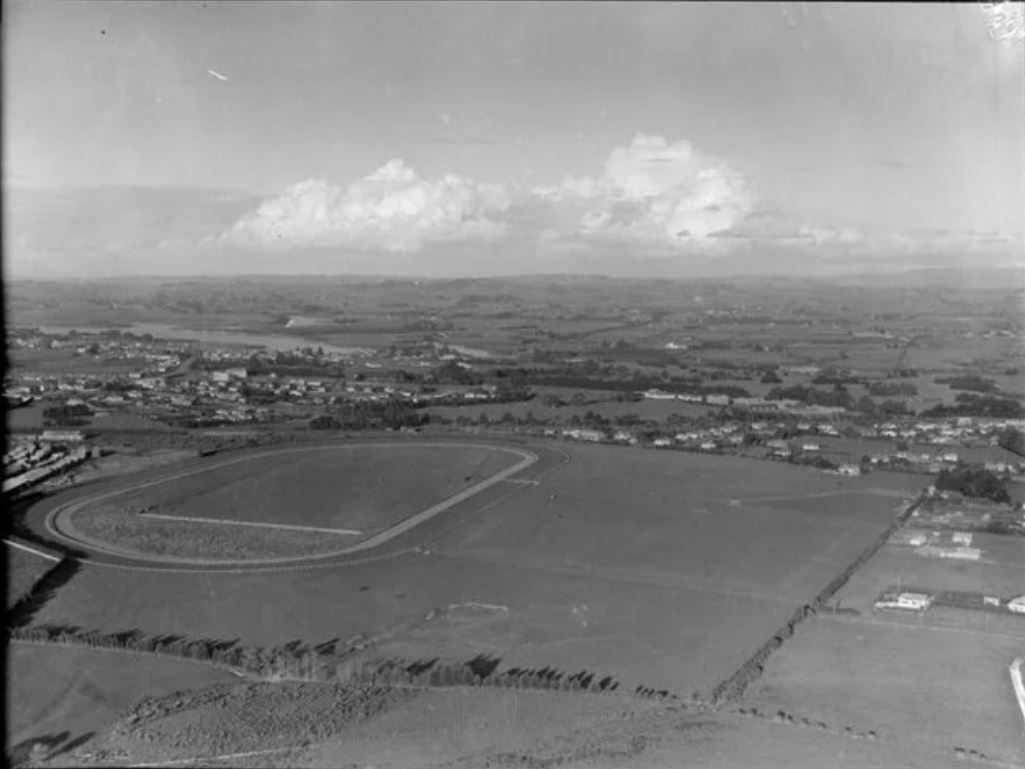
The trotting ground in Māngere (in 1931) which was used for some lower grade games in the early 1930s.

1929 Stallard Cup results
	Date		Score		Score	Venue
Round 1	13 July	Northcote	5	Parnell	2	Victoria Park, 3pm
–	13 July	Mangere	17	Richmond B	3	Sturgess Park, Otahuhu, 3pm
–	13 July	Otahuhu	5	Point Chevalier	0	Mangere Racecourse, 3pm
Round 2	20 July	Northcote	9	Mangere	5	Victoria Park, 3pm
–	20 July	Point Chevalier	5	Richmond B	3	Carlaw Park # 1, 1:30pm
–	20 July	Otahuhu	24	Parnell	0	Auckland Domain # 5, 3pm
Round 3	3 Aug	Northcote	6	Richmond B	0	Outer Domain, 3pm
–	3 Aug	Point Chevalier	11	Parnell	8	Auckland Domain # 6, 3pm
–	3 Aug	Otahuhu	12	Mangere	8	Victoria Park, 3pm
Round 4	10 Aug	Point Chevalier	13	Mangere	0	Carlaw Park # 1, 1:30pm
–	10 Aug	Parnell	PPD	Richmond	PPD	Auckland Domain, 3pm
–	10 Aug	Otahuhu	7	Northcote	3	Victoria Park, 3pm
Round 5	31 Aug	Richmond B	11	Otahuhu	8	Carlaw Park # 2, 1:30pm
–	31 Aug	Parnell	Loss by Forfeit	Mangere	Won by Forfeit	Auckland Domain # 2, 3pm
–	31 Aug	Point Chevalier	3	Northcote	2	Victoria Park, 3pm
Final	7 Sep	Otahuhu	11	Point Chevalier	0	Carlaw Park # 2, 1:30pm

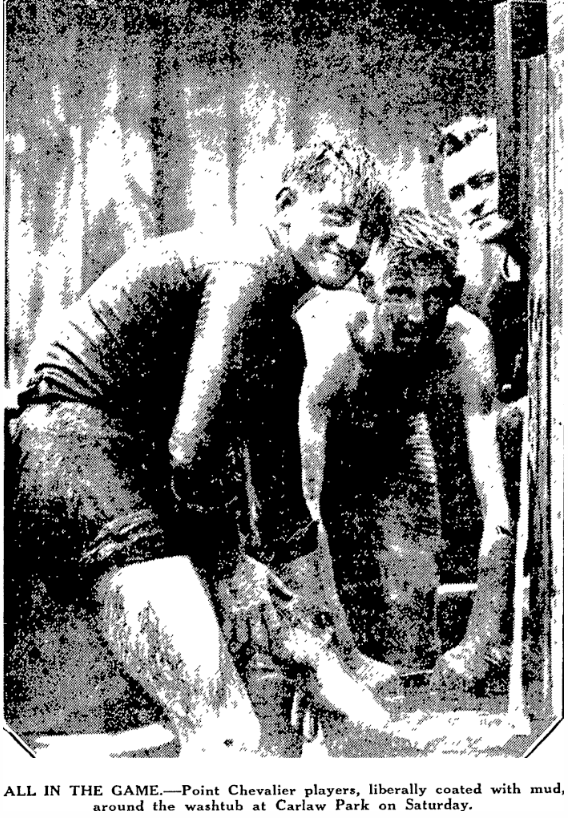

== Lower grades and exhibition games ==
=== Lower grades ===
Richmond won the Davis Shield for lower grade points accumulated once again. They would dominate this trophy throughout the 1920s and 30s.

=== Lower grade competitions ===
==== Second Grade ====
Devonport won the championship after sealing it in round 14 with a 12-0 win over Kingsland. It was the fourth consecutive season they had won the second grade championship which was said to be a record in New Zealand for that particular grade. Mount Albert finished runner up just 1 point behind. Mount Albert won the knockout competition when they defeated Devonport on September 28. Mangere had entered a team in the competition but withdrew after defaulting their first two games. The amalgamated New Lynn and Glen Eden club (Glen Lynn) entered a team in the knockout competition, drawing with Newton 6-6, before losing to Ponsonby 18-0. The knockout competition was won by Mount Albert United.

Team	Pld	W	D	L	B	F	A	Pts
Devonport United	12	10	1	1	2	152	41	21
Mount Albert United	12	10	0	2	1	141	37	20
Ponsonby United	12	7	1	4	2	93	64	15
Mount Wellington	11	7	0	4	2	77	90	14
Remuera	12	3	0	9	2	38	103	6
Newton Rangers	12	2	0	10	2	44	100	4
Kingsland Athletic	11	1	0	10	2	19	127	2

==== Third grade open (Hayward Shield) ====
Richmond won the championship after they beat Glen Lynn in the final by 2 points to 0 a Carlaw Park on August 17. Richmond also won the knockout competition with a 18-0 win over Ellerslie in the final on September 21. They had beaten Ponsonby B by default a week earlier while Ellerslie had upset Kingsland 11-5 in the other. Ellerslie had surprisingly made it to the final after only winning two matches during the championship. The majority of the results were reported and the final standings were published in the newspaper which was very unusual in these early decades.

Team	Pld	W	D	L	B	F	A	Pts
Richmond Rovers	13	11	1	1	1	285	17	23
Ponsonby United B	13	10	0	2	0	190	48	20
Glen Lynn	13	9	0	4	1	84	35	18
Kingsland Athletic	13	8	1	4	1	95	73	17
Ponsonby United A	12	3	0	9	1	44	137	6
Ellerslie United	13	3	0	10	0	24	203	6
Point Chevalier	12	2	0	10	1	42	183	4
Devonport United	7	0	0	7	0	6	74	0

==== Third grade intermediate ====
The championship was won by Devonport, 3 points ahead of Akarana. The knockout competition was won by Newmarket 7 to 6 on September 28, though the score was also reported as 10-6. Devonport had beaten City by default in one semi final while Newmarket won the other semi final 12-2 against Akarana. Newton entered a team in the competition but they withdrew without playing a game, while Mount Albert withdrew after 10 rounds having only played 7 games.

Team	Pld	W	D	L	B	F	A	Pts
Devonport United	12	11	1	0	2	140	20	23
Akarana	13	10	0	3	2	191	40	20
Newmarket	13	8	0	5	1	112	41	16
City Rovers	13	7	0	6	1	108	42	14
Richmond Rovers	11	5	0	6	0	71	89	10
Northcote & Birkenhead Ramblers	13	2	2	9	2	15	125	6
Glen Lynn	12	2	0	10	2	26	133	4
Mount Albert United	7	0	1	6	1	3	170	1

==== Fourth grade (Hospital Cup) ====
Devonport won the championship undefeated with 16 wins from 16 games, scoring 356 points and only conceding 32. Richmond were runners up 9 further points back. Devonport reportedly won the knockout competition when they beat Richmond 12-5 in the final on October 19. Devonport had won their semi final 6-0 over Akarana, while Richmond beat Kingsland 7-6 in the other semi final. However the Sun newspaper reported that Akarana won the knockout competition on March 29, 1930. Mt Wellington withdrew from the championship after 9 rounds while Remuera withdrew also after playing 9 games but in the 12 rounds having defaulted for 3 weeks.

Team	Pld	W	D	L	B	F	A	Pts
Devonport United	16	16	0	0	1	356	32	32
Richmond Rovers	14	11	1	2	0	168	28	23
Kingsland Athletic	15	8	3	3	0	150	44	19
Akarana	15	8	2	5	2	200	52	18
City Rovers	16	9	0	7	1	118	114	18
Remuera United	11	4	1	6	0	69	19	9
Ponsonby United	15	4	1	10	0	55	130	9
Mount Albert United	14	3	1	10	2	42	237	7
Otahuhu Rovers	16	0	2	14	1	28	399	2
Mount Wellington	9	0	1	8	0	25	147	1

==== Fifth grade (Endean Shield) ====
Richmond won the championship and also the knockout competition. They defeated Marist 14-9 in the knockout final on 21 September following a semi final win over Point Chevalier by 14 points to 4 while Marist had beaten Kingsland in the other semi final. Otahuhu had initially entered a side but failed to take the field and withdrew after round 1. A table was published in the newspapers after 7 rounds however many of the results in the second half of the season were not reported so the final standings are incomplete.

Team	Pld	W	D	L	B	F	A	Pts
Richmond Rovers	16	14	0	0	0	233	19	28
Newmarket	14	9	1	4	2	147	64	19
Point Chevalier	14	8	2	4	1	83	65	18
Marist Old Boys	15	7	2	2	1	112	59	16
Akarana	15	3	1	7	1	24	88	7
Devonport United	15	2	1	7	1	44	73	5
Kingsland Athletic	14	2	0	9	0	54	111	4
City Rovers	15	0	1	11	1	20	237	1

==== Sixth grade A (Walker Shield) ====
Richmond won the championship ahead of Otahuhu and Marist. Otahuhu won the knockout competition when they beat Richmond 11-6 in the final on October 12. Otahuhu had beaten City in one semi final while Richmond beat Kingsland 11-0 in the other semi final. The standings were reported after 8 rounds but the final standings were not reported and many results were also not reported so the following table is incomplete.

Team	Pld	W	D	L	B	F	A	Pts
Richmond Rovers	17	11	0	2	1	203	29	22
Otahuhu Rovers	15	10	1	3	2	147	105	21
Marist Old Boys	17	9	1	6	0	207	95	19
Northcote & Birkenhead Ramblers	16	8	0	6	1	87	82	16
Kingsland Athletic	18	5	1	8	2	55	124	11
City Rovers	17	4	2	5	1	53	88	10
Devonport United	17	5	0	8	2	71	93	10
Point Chevalier	16	4	0	8	1	54	128	8
Newmarket	15	1	0	12	3	5	141	2
Akarana	4	0	0	4	0	4	44	0

==== Sixth grade B (Myers Cup) ====
Richmond B won the championship with a remarkable point scoring record of 657 points scored with the majority of their wins coming at 0 points conceded. They also won the Milicich knockout final when they beat Northcote 16-2 on September 28. They had beaten Newton 5-3 in their semi final, while Northcote defeated Point Chevalier 2-0 in the other semi final. The championship standings were reported after 8 rounds and again at the conclusion of the season. The team featured future New Zealand international Noel Bickerton.

Team	Pld	W	D	L	B	F	A	Pts
Richmond Rovers B	16	16	0	0	2	657	8	32
Marist Old Boys	16	11	2	3	2	97	61	24
Northcote & Birkenhead Ramblers	16	10	3	3	1	135	74	23
Newton Rangers	15	7	1	7	2	168	50	15
Richmond Rovers A	15	6	1	8	2	45	180	13
Papatoetoe	14	5	1	8	2	140	215	11
Ellerslie United	16	5	1	10	1	43	245	11
Glen Lynn	16	3	4	9	3	96	170	10
Point Chevalier	16	0	1	15	3	26	397	1

==== Schoolboys competition ====
Newmarket won the championship. They also won the knockout competition when they beat Mangere 25-5 in the final on October 12. At the end of the season in early November a seven team knockout tournament was held at Carlaw Park with proceeds going to the purchase of jerseys. Newmarket defeated Mangere in the final by 6 points to 0 to complete a remarkable season for the side.

Team	Pld	W	D	L	B	F	A	Pts
Newmarket Primary School	17	14	0	1	2	272	21	28
Newton Primary School	17	10	1	4	1	116	86	21
Onehunga Convent (St Joseph's School)	17	7	3	5	2	121	78	17
Parnell/Akarana	19	7	2	6	1	90	85	16
Richmond Road School	17	6	1	4	2	89	63	13
Otahuhu Schools	17	6	0	8	2	70	128	12
Papatoetoe Primary School	19	4	3	9	1	91	170	11
Mangere Primary School	17	4	2	6	2	46	76	10
Ellerslie Primary School	17	4	1	8	2	44	79	9
Devonport Primary School	18	2	3	4	1	32	75	7
Mt Albert Primary School	18	1	1	10	2	37	147	3

=== Exhibition and junior representative matches ===
The Auckland Junior representative side that played South Auckland included future Kiwi Albert Laing, and Auckland representative cricket wicket keeper Horace Hunt. The full side was as follows: Albert Laing (Devonport), B. Munroe (Mount Albert), G Jacobs (Mount Wellington), H. Tate (Devonport), T Davis (Richmond), C. Dunn (Richmond), F. Martin (Kingsland), Harvey White (Ponsonby), D. Kirwan (Mount Albert), Horace Hunt (Devonport), Herb Lunn (Ponsonby), H. Forbes (Kingsland), J. Hawkes (Devonport). Reserves: J. Ragg (Newton), C. Jamieson, K. Sheddon (Remuera), F. Joy (Newton), F. Hemmingson (Grey Lynn).

==== Kamo and Athletic Combined v Richmond Juniors ====
30 March	Kamo and Athletic Combined	9-23	Richmond Juniors	Kamo Recreation Ground
3:00	Try: McDonald 2, Connelly		Try: Deason, Patterson 2, Main 2, Goldwater, Carey; Con: Verrall	Referee: F Little

==== Other Matches ====
List of matches
	Date		Score		Score	Referee	Venue	Scoring
Junior Inter-Provincial	27 July	Auckland Juniors	15	South Auckland Juniors	8	Stuart Billman	Carlaw Park # 1, 1:30pm	C. Dunn 2, Joseph Ragg, Davis, and Joy tries for Auckland, for South Auckland Neil, and R. Hart scored tries with Geary converting 1.
Exhibition	10 Aug	Huntly	23	City	13	R.T. Hill	Huntly	Unknown Scoring
Exhibition	17 Aug	Northcote	18	Hamilton B	9	-	Northcote Municipal Recreation Ground (Stafford Park), Northcote	-
Exhibition	17 Aug	Huntly	16	Parnell	21	-	Huntly	-
Junior Inter-Provincial	31 Aug	Auckland Juniors	16	Waikato Juniors	11	-	Huntly	-
Schoolboy Inter-Provincial	5 Sep	North Auckland Schools	2	Auckland Schoolboys	17	-	Whangarei	-
Schoolboy Match	6 Sep	Hikurangi	4	Auckland Schoolboys	6	-	Hikurangi Recreation Ground	-
Schoolboy Exhibition	14 Sep	Huntly	20	Devonport	8	R.T. Hill	Huntly, 3pm	Unknown Scoring

== Representative season ==
The selectors for the season were the same as last year, Edwin V. Fox, Ernie Asher, and Bert Avery. The Auckland team played three matches and defended the Northern Union Challenge Cup against South Auckland, Northland, and Canterbury. Auckland played three matches between July 27 and August 24, all for the Northern Union Challenge Cup. They saw them defeat South Auckland in a hard-fought 11–8 result, the newly formed Northland representative team by a narrow 22–19 margin, and Canterbury comfortably by 47 points to 18. The representative season was finished with a match between the North Island and South Island won by the latter 22 to 13. Unlike in previous years the North Island team featured several players from outside of Auckland, mainly from the Waikato region.

=== Representative fixtures ===
==== Auckland v South Auckland (Northern Union Cup) ====
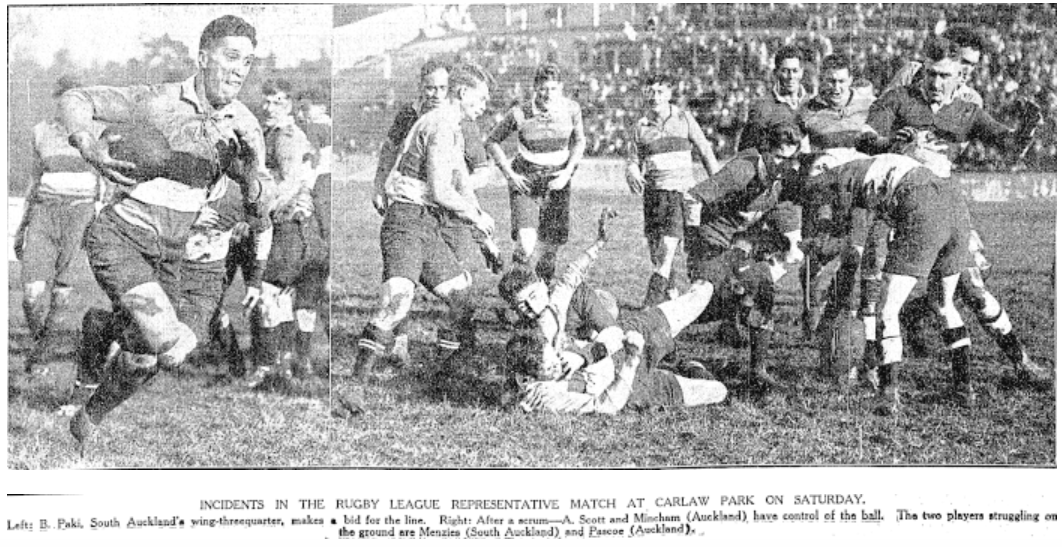

W. Shortland had been named to play for Auckland but was left out of the side at the last minute as he was not eligible to play. The reason being that he had only recently switched codes and had not played 3 matches yet for his club. Huatahi Paki (who is pictured) broke his ribs during the match. Lindsay Simons, who was on debut for Auckland at fullback went off injured with Frank Delgrosso moving into that position and Ted Mincham coming on in his Auckland debut. Auckland won the match narrowly by 11 points to 8 before a crowd of 10,000 at Carlaw Park.

27 July	Auckland	11–8	South Auckland	Carlaw Park 1
3:00	Try: Hec Brisbane 2, Len Scott; Con: Frank Delgrosso		Try: George Tittleton; Con: Tom Timms; Pen: Tom Timms	Attendance: 10,000; Referee: Les Bull

==== Auckland v Northland (Northern Union Cup) ====
The Northland team was coached by Maurice Wetherill and included Ted Meyer as captain who went on to become a New Zealand representative in 1930. He had previously played rugby union for North Auckland and the North Island. Puti Tipene (Steve) Watene was on debut for Auckland. Victor Fagan, the Ponsonby forward also made his one and only appearance for Auckland. His son Jack Fagan was Kiwi #401 and played 17 tests for New Zealand from 1961 to 1965.

17 August	Auckland	22–19	Northland	Carlaw Park 1
3:00	Try: Robert Carter, Frank Delgrosso 2, Claude List, Allan Seagar, Gordon Campbell; Con: Frank Delgrosso 2		Try: L Grogan, Dick Cunningham, T Bergan, N Dunn 2 Con: L Grogan 2	Referee: Vic Simpson

==== Auckland v Canterbury (Northern Union Cup) ====
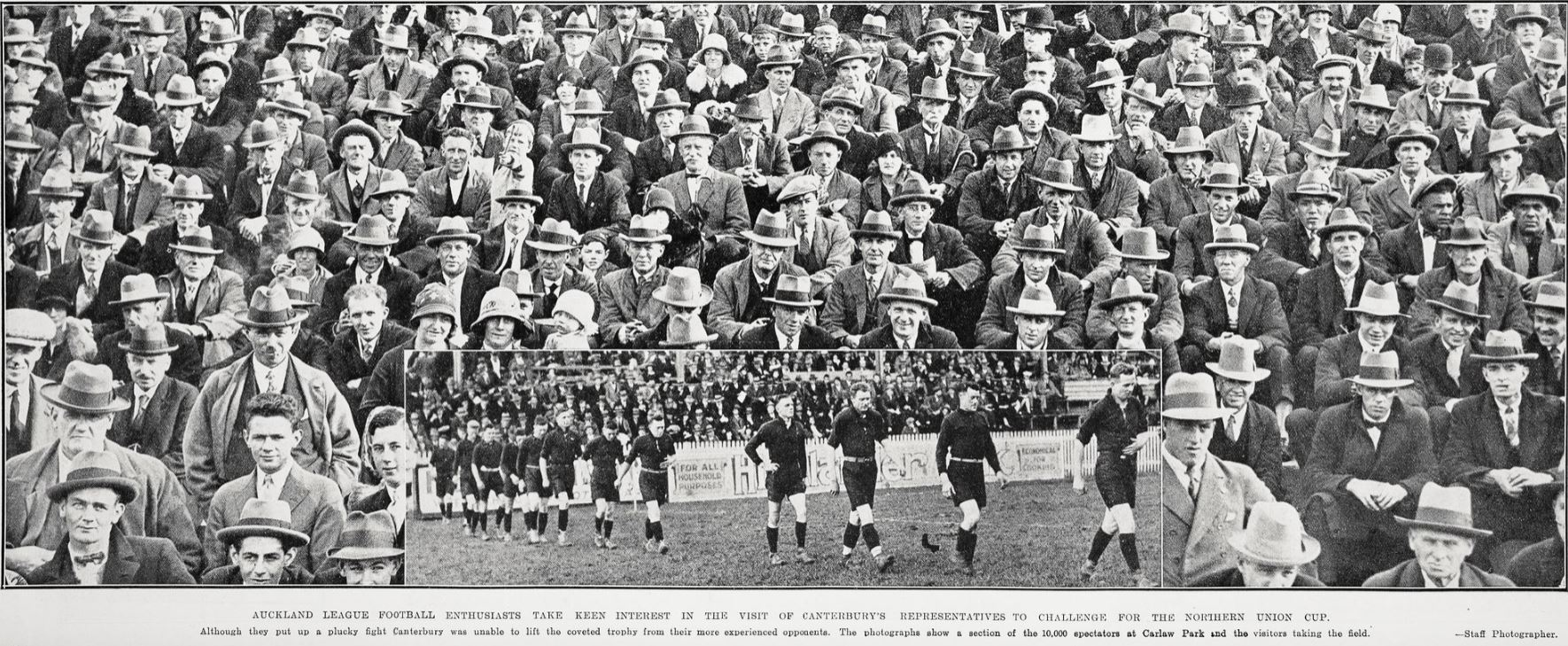
Canterbury team coming on to the field in the inset photograph and the crowd in the terrace.

The Canterbury side was coached by former Ponsonby, Auckland, and New Zealand player, Thomas McClymont.

24 August	Auckland	47–18	Canterbury	Carlaw Park 1
3:00	Try: Claude List, Hec Brisbane, Robert Carter, Frank Delgrosso, Allan Seagar, Norman Pascoe, Jim O'Brien, Bert Payne 3, Stanley Francis; Con: Frank Delgrosso 4, Jim O'Brien, Charles Gregory, Stanley Francis		Try: E Spillane, Jim Amos, A O'Connor, T Green; Con: Jim Sanders, A O'Connor 2	Attendance: 10,000; Referee: Billy Mincham

==== Inter island match ====
Len Scott was injured during the match and replaced by Allan Seagar for the North Island while for the South Island Jim Sanders was injured and replaced by Doogan. In past years the North Island team was dominated by players from the Auckland competition however the North Island team on this occasion featured players from outside Auckland such as Dick Trautvetter, Bob Stephenson, Joe Menzies and Tom Timms from the Waikato (South Auckland) side, and Ted Meyer and T Bergan from Northland.

7 September	North Island	13–22	South Island	Carlaw Park 1
3:00	Try: Bill Hamilton, Ted Meyer, Frank Delgrosso; Con: Charles Gregory, Frank Delgrosso		Try: Alf Townsend, Johnny Dodds, Norm Griffiths, Mick O'Brien; Con: Bond 2 Pen: Bond 3	Attendance: 8,000; Referee: Percy Rogers

=== Auckland representative matches played and points scored ===
No	Name	Club Team	Played	Tries	Con	Pen	Points
1	Frank Delgrosso	Ponsonby	3	3	7	0	23
2	Hec Brisbane	Marist	2	3	0	0	9
2	Albert (Bert) Payne	Ponsonby	1	3	0	0	9
4	Claude List	Kingsland	3	2	0	0	6
5	Allan Seagar	Devonport	3	2	0	0	6
6	Robert (Bob) Carter	Kingsland	2	2	0	0	6
7	Stanley Francis	Newton	2	1	1	0	5
8	Jim O'Brien	Marist	1	1	1	0	5
9	Len Scott	Devonport	1	1	0	0	3
10	Gordon Campbell	Marist	1	1	0	0	3
11	Charles Gregory	Marist	2	0	1	0	2
12	Lyndsay Simons	Devonport	1	0	0	0	0
12	A McIntyre	Ponsonby	1	0	0	0	0
12	Alf Scott	Devonport	1	0	0	0	0
12	Bill Skelton	Ponsonby	2	0	0	0	0
12	Ernest Ruby	Devonport	2	0	0	0	0
12	Dick Moisley	Marist	3	0	0	0	0
12	Norman Pascoe	City	2	0	0	0	0
12	Bill Hamilton	City	1	0	0	0	0
12	Puti Tipene Watene	City	1	0	0	0	0
12	William (Willie) Shortland	City	2	0	0	0	0
12	Ralph Jenkinson	Richmond	1	0	0	0	0
12	Ted Mincham	Richmond	1	0	0	0	0
12	Victor Fagan	Ponsonby	1	0	0	0	0

== Annual general meetings and club news ==
- Akarana Rugby League Football Club held at Carlaw Park on Sunday 24 March. It was noted that the club had assets totally £36 3s 5d. They had also sent a team on tour in each of its 3 seasons. The tour to Christchurch had cost £115 which had been raised at social functions during the season.
- Auckland Rugby League annual general meeting held at the Chamber of Commerce, Swanson Street on Thursday 4 April.
- Auckland Rugby League Referees Association held at the League Rooms on Monday 25 March.
- City Rovers Football Club held at Carlaw Park on Sunday 17 March. The City team acquired the services of W. Shortland, the North Auckland and Māori representative rugby halfback. He moved to live in Auckland and surprised followers of both codes by playing for City in their Round 12 match.
- Devonport United Football Club held at Ford’s Tea Rooms on Monday 19 March.
- Ellerslie United League Football Club held at the club's training shed, Ellerslie on Monday 25 March.
- Grafton Athletic held at Buffaloes Hall, St. Benedict’s St., near Newton Rd, on Sunday 24 March. It was decided at a later meeting to amalgamate with the Kingsland Rovers club.
- Junior Management Committee held at the Auckland Rugby League Rooms, Gray’s Buildings, on Tuesday 19 March.
- Kingsland Rovers Football Club held at Buffalo Lodge Rooms, St Benedicts St on Sunday 24 March. It was decided at a later meeting to amalgamate with the Grafton Athletic club. The vice-president Mr. Edward Thomas Avery died in a fall from a ladder while at his work at the Auckland Gas Company. His son was Bert Avery, who had captained the New Zealand team in England.
- Mangere United Football Club held in Cook’s Hall, Onehunga, Tuesday 9 April.
- Marist Brothers Old Boys League Football Club held at Donovan’s Gymnasium, Parnell on Thursday 14 March.
- Mt. Albert United Rugby League Football Club held at King George Hall, Mt Albert Terminus on Thursday 7 March.
- Mt Wellington Rugby League Football Club request players to get in touch with Secretary W.E. Frost.
- New Lynn League Football Club held at the Foresters’ Hall, New Lynn, on 13 March. The New Lynn and Glen Eden teams played as one in 1929 under the name of Glen Lynn.
- Newmarket Rugby League Football Club held at No. 8 Melrose St., Newmarket, Thursday 28 February.
- Newton Rangers Football Club held at Y.M.C.A Buildings, Wellesley St. East, on Monday 18 March. Newton complained after 3 rounds to the Management Committee that it was impossible for members of their team to play early matches at Carlaw Park as its players had to travel long distances at a heavy expense.
- Northcote and Birkenhead Ramblers League Football Club held at Foresters’ Hall, Birkenhead on Monday. The Northcote Borough Council met on 21 May. It was decided that both rugby union and soccer had to pay for the use of the municipal football ground but league did not on account of it providing the use of its own large mower and labour to cut the grass when required. All clubs had to make their own arrangements for marking out the ground and removing the goal posts after play each Saturday.
- Otahuhu Rugby League Football Club held at the Gas Company’s Hall, Otahuhu, Monday 4 March. At the end of the season Otahuhu held a reunion where the B Grade team was congratulated on winning the Thistle Cup, and the schoolboys team was presented with the Davis Cup.
- Parnell League Football Club held at Donovan’s Gymnasium, Parnell, on Thursday 14 March.
- Papatoetoe Rugby League Club held at Papatoetoe Town Hall on Tuesday 2 April. They decided to form three teams and ask the council for permission to play on any of its grounds. They requested assistance from the Auckland Rugby League in the purchase of jerseys.
- Point Chevalier League Football Club held at the Sailing Club Hall on Wednesday 20 March. 60 members were present and it was decided to enter 6 teams across the various grades.
- Ponsonby United Football Club held at Leys Institute, Ponsonby, on Monday 18 March.
- Remuera Rugby League Football Club held at Mr. White’s Residence, 1a Clonbern Road, on Monday 11 March.
- Richmond Rovers Football Club held at the Gaiety Hall, Surrey Crescent on Thursday 14 March. Richmond was granted £10 by the Auckland Rugby League towards their trip to Hikurangi to play there. Richmond lost the services of T. Hanlon who signed to play for Broughton Rangers Club in England. He was set to leave on the Ruahine Ship on 21 August. Near the end of the season the league gave Prentice, a Richmond player for several seasons a sum of money to recognise his efforts over the years. He had suffered “a good deal of adversity”, including a broken nose... and has been put to a good deal of medical expense, but has never at any time made a claim upon the insurance fund provided by the League”.

|} |}
