= Mount Wellington Rugby League Football Club =

Defunct NZ rugby league club, based in Auckland

Mount Wellington Rugby League Club
Club information
- Full name: Mount Wellington Rugby League Football Club
- Short name: Mount Wellington
- Colours: Royal Blue
- Founded: 1929
- Exited: 1931

Former details
- Ground: Westfield
- Competition: Auckland Rugby League

The Mount Wellington Rugby League Football Club was a rugby league club in Auckland, New Zealand, which existed for 3 years from 1929 to 1931. They competed in the Auckland Rugby League lower grade competitions. The club was made up of players largely from the Westfield Freezing Works which existed in the Mount Wellington suburb of Auckland. They ceased to exist at the beginning of 1932 when they essentially merged with the Otahuhu Rovers club. Decades later a Westfield rugby league club formed again before ceasing after the meat works were closed down in 1989.

The later Mount Wellington Rugby League Football Club was formed in 1948 though it was officially affiliated under the name of Panmure.

== History ==
=== 1928 Formation ===
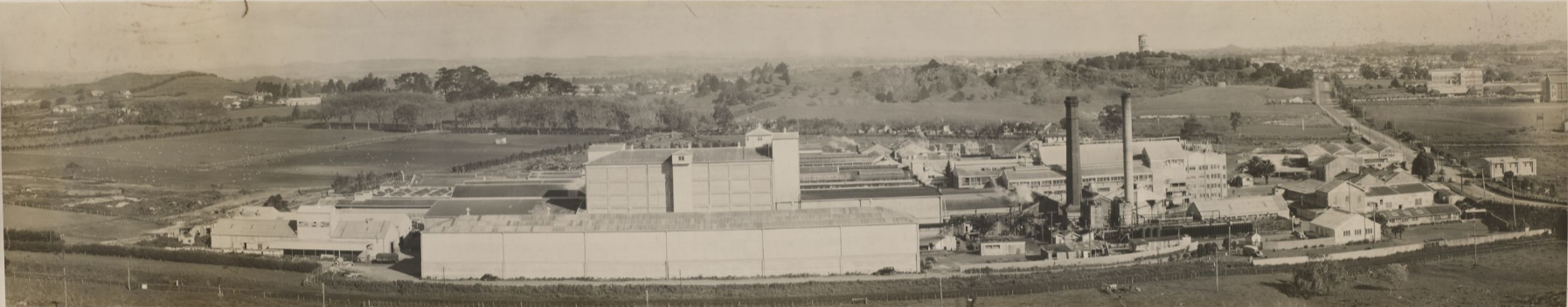
The Westfield Freezing Works in 1935. Their rugby league field can be seen adjacent to Great South Road immediately behind the buildings.

On the evening of the 27th of September, 1928 the Auckland Rugby League received a letter at their weekly meeting from Mr. William Ernest Frost, jun.. He wrote “advising that the municipal abattoir at Westfield, which had been playing house matches, proposed to enter in the league club’s competition next season as the Mount Wellington club, which already had a good ground and dressing accommodation”. The new club asked for royal blue as its colours. The Auckland Rugby League chairman and secretary “were authorised to consult the new club upon its proposals”. The New Zealand Herald also reported from the meeting that the club would play under the name “Mount Wellington Club”. One of the matches that Frost had been alluding to in his letter was a game between “a combined 13 of Westfield auctioneers and clerks” and a butchers’ team at Ellerslie on June 2 in 1928. The team of auctioneers and clerks was named and included:- W. Bowden, J. Rowe, David Brideson, F. Day, William Vuglar, E. Barnaby, T. Scanlan, S. Day, J. Hellaby, W. Wadsworth, A. Naylor, R. Cocran, and W. Lawson. With the emergency players being J. Nieher and D. Reid in the backs, and M. McGill and A. Couper in the forwards. On September 22 a team in the Third Grade competition named “Westfield” played against Mount Albert on the Otahuhu Reserve at 3pm. It is likely that this is a side selected from the same players playing in the Third Grade knockout competition. These competitions were sometimes opened up to teams which had not competed in the championship. Whilst the result was not reported it is likely that Westfield lost as Mount Albert progressed on in the competition while a week later on September 27 a team named Westfield was scheduled to play Newton Rangers at Mount Albert (in Morningside) at 2pm. The match was a friendly as the 2nd grade competition had been completed for the year and it was the only fixture in the grade.

=== First Games 1929 (2nd Grade and 4th Grade) ===
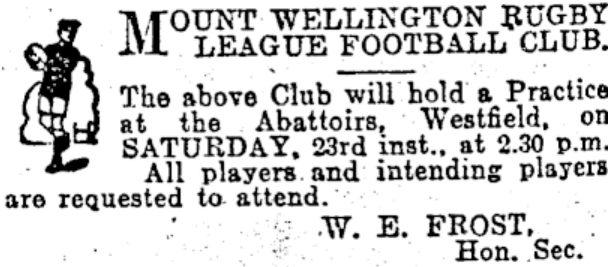
Advertisement for their March 23 practice match.

The 1929 season saw the club field official teams under their newly formed club in the 2nd and 4th Grades. On March 16 their secretary, William Frost posted a notice in the New Zealand Herald stating “Mount Wellington Rugby League Football Club, wishes players desirous of joining the club to communicate with him at his address”. He advertised a practise to be held at the Abattoirs, Westfield ground on Saturday, March 23 at 2.30pm with “all players and intending players requested to attend”. On the evening of Monday, March 25 the club held their “annual smoke concert” at the Auckland Municipal Abattoirs in Westfield. Mr. R.W. Rugg, the manager of the abattoirs, and president of the club said “in the last season the club had played six matches and had won four. This season a strong team had been formed, and it was hoped that in all matches Mount Wellington would be the victors. However, it would be better for them to lose than to win by rough play or illegal tactics”. Then several speakers were said to have congratulated the members on their club and on the support they had in Mr. Rugg and the management. Among those present were Mr. J.B. Paterson and W. Casey, members of the City Council, Mr. J.S. Brigham, town clerk, Mr. F. Hellaby, Mr. C. Fearon, Mr. J. Marshall, and Mr. J. Gillies. Songs were sung by Messrs. Bowling, Evans, F. Baker, Hall, and A. Austin.

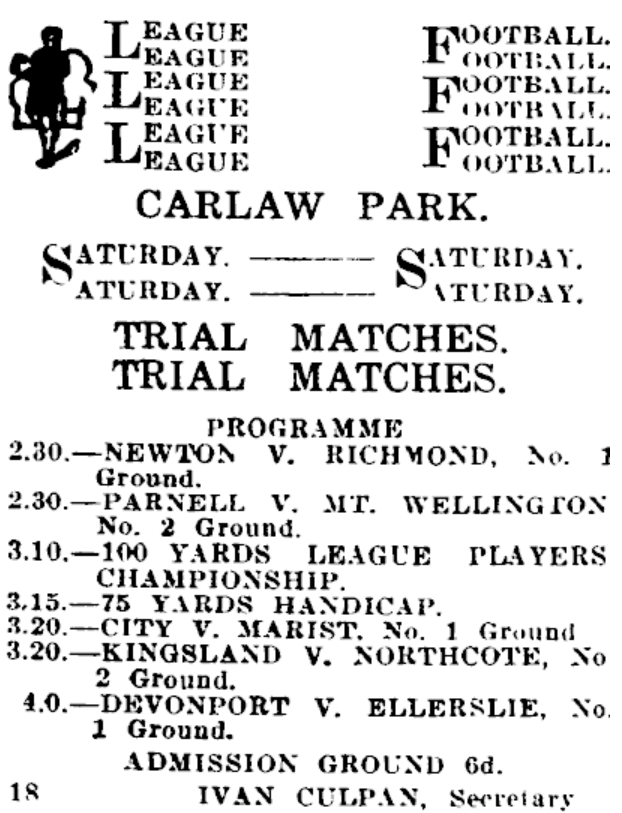
Newspaper advertisement showing Mount Wellington's first ever official game.

Their 2nd Grade side had 11 reported matches in the championship and finished with a 7 win, 4 loss record. Of known results they scored 77 points and conceded 90 to finish approximately 4th of 7 teams. While their 4th Grade side struggled, drawing 1 game, losing 8 and withdrawing from the championship after 9 rounds. The first game for the 2nd Grade side was a pre-season match on Carlaw Park number 2 field on April 20. Their opponent was Parnell. Following the game the Auckland Star wrote that “the appearance of the new Mount Wellington side was a new feature indicative of the growth of the game”. The match finished 0-0, with the match report stating “the game between Mount Wellington and Parnell attracted interest because the Westfield team was making its debut in the code as a junior team. Mount Wellington, with the sun and cross wind in their favour, took the initiative from Parnell’s kickoff. A penalty against them was resultless, and shortly afterwards Jacob (Mount Wellington) made a good run to the corner, following a period of desultory play, Parnell forced down before the change-over, but with Keane, Hosking, and Kerr got dangerous until stopped by Marcroft. Parnell was storming the citadel when the bell sounded a pointless draw”. The Sun (Auckland) newspaper wrote “the Mount Wellington v Parnell match caused quite a lot of interest, as Mount Wellington was making its debut in the code as a junior team. Three or four Union players, including Jacob, of City, were the mainstays of the Mount Wellington team, the remainder being made up of recruits…”. They also highlighted the “brilliant saving” of Marcroft at fullback who stopped the Parnell backs many times. The Auckland Star also wrote that “a gratifying feature that was indicative of the growth of the game, was the display of the newly formed Mount Wellington thirteen, who gave a good account of themselves against Parnell”.

There next match was against Newton Rangers at 3pm on May 4 at their Mount Wellington ground. The referee was the experienced Frank Thompson who refereed senior games from 1916 to 1938. The 4th Grade side was also playing there at 2pm against Richmond Rovers with Thompson refereeing that game too. The 2nd Grade side beat Newton 13 to 5, while the 4th Grade team was defeated 21-0 by Richmond. The teams for each side were named in the newspapers the day prior to the matches. The 2nd Grade side was Stovic, Jacob, Rugg, Haggie (2), Frost, McKelvie, Pilkington, Wilson, Whittle, Walker, Arnold (2), Ritchie, Miller, and Marcroft. While the 4th Grade team was Killgour (3), Hammond, Greenwood, Handisides, Day, Tooman, Gibson, O’Connor (2), Brewster, Miller, Brosnan, and Finn.

The following weekend on May 11 the 2nd Grade side had a default win over Māngere United, while the 4th Grade team lost to Remuera 15 to 4. The 2nd Grade side had a 13-5 win over Ponsonby United on May 18, and a 16-0 loss to Devonport United on May 25. The Sun wrote a short piece about the club which said “the Mount Wellington Club is at present experiencing its first season and for a new club is doing remarkably well. Rumour has it that there is a considerable rivalry between Mount Wellington and Otahuhu Rovers.

The 2nd Grade side then played a controversial match with Kingsland Athletic on June 1. The match was called off when the scores were tied 5-5 but Mount Wellington were awarded the win as the referee had stopped the match due to poor behaviour from the Kingsland team. The Sun reported “the Mount Wellington v Kingsland second grade league match, set down for decision on the Mount Wellington ground… had not proceeded far before it was evident that stern measures would have to be enforced by Mr. C. Moore, the referee. The visitors overstepped the mark time after time with appeals and questioning of the referee’s decisions. After several warnings, the controller of the whistle issued a final reprimand that any future offenders would be sent to the sideline”. Soon after the Kingsland captain as sent off for questioning another decision, and then a team mate followed for arguing the decision. The Kingsland team was unsure if they wanted to continue and the referee called the match off. They had a 9-0 loss to Mount Albert United on June 8 and then a 8-0 win over Remuera on June 15. The Sun described the later match as being “perhaps the hardest fought game in the second grade”. All of Mount Wellington’s points came in the “closing stages of the game, and for the most part it appeared that the game would end up a draw”. Following a game against Newton on June 22 and a bye a week later a table published in the Auckland Star showed that the 2nd Grade side was coming 3rd out of 7 teams and the 4th Grade side was last and evidently about to drop out of the competition.

On July 17 the club requested that a special fixture be held at their Westfield ground at some stage with the Auckland Rugby League agreeing to do so at the “earliest opportunity”. The 2nd Grade side lost to Mount Albert 15-5 on July 20. At this stage of the season the Auckland junior representative side was selected with G. Jacobs named in the centre three-quarters. Their opponents were South Auckland (Waikato) junior representatives at Carlaw Park. The match was curtain-raiser to the full senior representative sides. The Auckland side won 15 to 8. The 2nd Grade side had a 18-14 win against Ponsonby on August 3, a bye on August 10, and then a 5-3 win against Devonport on August 17 in the first round of the knockout competition. G. Jacobs was selected in the Auckland junior representative side once more for a match against the Waikato junior representatives in Huntly. The 2nd Grade side beat Ponsonby 6-5 on August 24.

On August 31 the Auckland Rugby League scheduled the first grade round 1 Roope Rooster knockout match between City Rovers and Ellerslie United at the Mount Wellington/Westfield ground at 3pm. City won a match described as “not impressive” before a “moderate attendance of spectators, who spent the majority of the 80 minutes of play criticising the referee’s rulings and the decisions of the line umpires”. The match featured the late arrival of Steve Watene who came on after the match had been going 15 minutes to assist the City backs. Watene was in his first season of senior rugby league and would be selected for New Zealand a year later. Len Barchard and Stan Clark were in the City forwards and would also debut for New Zealand in 1930. Auckland representatives George Perry, William Shortland, and Norm Pascoe also played for City. The famous Craddock Dufty was at fullback for Ellerslie and kicked a penalty, he played for New Zealand from 1919 to 1930 on 51 occasions. Robert Crewther has also played for Auckland and was in the Ellerslie backs which Leslie Olliff at halfback would represent Auckland years later for the North Shore.

On the evening of Tuesday, September 3, the Mount Wellington club held their annual social in the Public Hall, Otahuhu with a large attendance. The social “took the form of a concert and a dance, and was very successful”. Supper was served in the dining room which had been decorated by the women’s committee which consisted of Mesdames, R.W. Rugg, J. Brown, G. Bentley, E. Pitman, R. Whale, W. Jamieson, and L. Wilson. Morrow’s Orchestra provided the music along with other performers. The Sun newspaper published a list of the majority of those present and what they were wearing.

On September 7 the 2nd Grade side played Mount Albert in a knockout game as curtain-raiser to the North Island v South Island inter-island match at Carlaw Park. They lost 24 to 3 and then were knocked out of the competition the following week with a loss to Newton, thus ending their season.

=== 1930 (2nd Grade) ===
In 1930 the Mount Wellington club only fielded a team in the 2nd Grade competition. On Monday, February 24 they held their annual meeting at 8pm at the Kingsford Hall in Otahuhu. The meeting was advertised by William Frost who was still their secretary. On April 12 the club ran a notice stating that they were holding a practice at their club’s ground at Westfield at 2.30pm.

The 2nd Grade side played 10 games in the championship and won 3, lost 7, scoring approximately 55 points and conceding 117. They finished about 5th of 7 sides. Their first game of the championship was against Marist Old Boys on May 10 at the Auckland Domain with the referee William Mincham, the father of New Zealand international Ted Mincham and grandfather of Robert Mincham who also played for New Zealand. Mount Wellington lost by 10 points to 3. They then lost the following weekend to Richmond Rovers 11-0 with the Sun writing a short piece on the match saying that it was 0-0 at halftime. The description of the game then only mentioned Richmond players. They lost their third match also, this time to Ponsonby by 20 to 8. A player named Edward L. Haggie was then transferred to the side from the Otahuhu club. They suffered two more defeats to Devonport United by 22 to 18 on June 7 and 15-0 to Ponsonby on June 28. They did however have their first win on July 5, when they beat Devonport 6 to 3. The match was played on the Westfield ground with F. Wilson refereeing. A heavy 25-3 loss to Richmond on July 12 saw them near the bottom of the standings before they had at least three consecutive wins. The Sun wrote a piece on their defeat though most comments were about Richmond. Richmond had a 6-0 lead before Baker, the Mount Wellington halfback “forced his way through the maroon pack to score a good try”. Richmond ended up winning the championship and included several players who would go on to play for their senior side for many years. They beat Māngere United 17-0 and then Marist by an unknown score at Westfield. A 14-3 win against Devonport on August 16 was followed by an unknown score against Māngere United and another 7-5 win over Marist. Their season concluded with a 16-5 loss to Ponsonby on September 6 and a probable loss to Richmond on September 13.

=== 1931 (2nd Grade and 4th Grade) ===
The 1931 season was to be the last for the club and replicated their first season in that they fielded teams in the 2nd and 4th Grades with the 4th Grade side dropping out part of the way through the season. Their annual meeting was held on Tuesday, March 24 at 8pm at the Westfield Abattoir with William Frost the secretary once more.

The 2nd Grade team played a practice match against Papakura at Papakura on April 18 at 3pm. A notice in the newspaper informed the players that the bus was leaving Otahuhu at 2pm. It was a historic game in that it was the first ever game of rugby league in Papakura. Mount Wellington won the game by 8 points to 5. The local Papakura newspaper, the Franklin Times wrote an article on the match which said “on Saturday last Papakura fielded a rugby league football team for the first time in history. Before a good attendance of residents and supporters the local team opposed a team from Mt. Wellington which contained several representative players. The local players were an eye-opener to even the most ardent enthusiasts of the game, and with a little combination will give the best teams fielded a good game. Shortly after 3pm cars began to arrive with Mt. Wellington supporters with a large mote vehicle containing the players. The dressing rooms provided by Mr. E.C. Foote were very favourably commented upon and after the match the players were amazed to find that showers were also provided and were availed of to the fullest extent. The local boys lined out spick and span in the club colours, red, the jerseys and socks being provided by the Papakura club”. In terms of the actual play L. Wilson kicked a penalty goal and Johnston scored a try, while for Mount Wellington R. Wales and J Miller scored tries with Campbell converting Miller’s try. Mount Wellington had to defend their line and narrowly avoided conceding tries on two occasions.

The Mount Wellington 2nd Grade side finished the championship with a 3 win and 8 loss record from 14 games with 3 results unknown to finish approximately 6th of 8 sides. They started the championship with a 10-0 win over Northcote & Birkenhead Ramblers on May 2, and a 28-3 loss to Point Chevalier on May 9. On May 16 both of their teams had default wins over Ponsonby and Ellerslie. The 2nd Grade side then lost to Māngere United 9 to 3 on May 23, and beat City Rovers 3-2 on May 30. On June 6 they played the Papakura team they had beaten at the start of the season but Papakura had improved significantly and they beat Mount Wellington 17 to 3. The Franklin Times wrote a detailed match report. Mt. Wellington won the toss and played with the sun at their backs in the first half but found themselves down 7-0 at halftime. The majority of the coverage named Papakura players individually and just made general comments about Mt Wellington. In the second half when they trailed 12-0 they nearly scored but a Papakura players leg got between the ball and the ground and soon after S. James of Papakura “soundly tackled L.C. Painter. Not to be denied Painter received the ball again and cutting in opened the Mount’s score. Miller’s kick failed”. Papakura scored a try soon after the kick off to win 17-3. They lost to Mount Albert 12-0 on June 13, had a bye a week later and then lost 13-0 to City on June 27. Another loss followed on July 4 and then they were defeated once more, 26 to 2 by Mount Albert. Their scores were not reported in July 18 and August 8 matches, but they lost on July 25 and lost once more to Papakura on August 15 my 6 points to 0 at the Westfield ground. The game was described as “scratchy”. They trailed 6-0 at halftime and had a good period on attack during the second half but were unable to score.

Mount Wellington had a bye on August 22 and then met Papakura once more, this time in the knockout competition. The game was played at Papatoetoe on August 29 at 3pm with Mr. A.E. Chapman refereeing. They failed to score yet again in a 16-0 defeat. Papakura was unable to muster a full side and luckily their 4th Grade team had a bye and several players were able to successfully fill in. The game was said to have been “full of incident and some ugly situations almost developed. Tempers were frayed in the hard game and some spectators would be well advised not to interfere with players. Great credit is due to the referee for the firm stand he took, and his tolerance towards certain players”.

The 4th Grade side opened the season with a 19-0 win over Papatoetoe on May 2 before an unknown score a week later and then their default win over Ellerslie. However they ceased to play beyond this point most likely due to a lack of players. During the season in June it was reported at the Auckland Rugby League Referees’ Association meeting that the Westfield ground had iron standards for goal posts and the crossbar was too low and the ground was not properly marked out.

=== 1932 merge with Otahuhu ===
At the beginning of the 1932 season the club secretary Mr. Lionel Walter Arnold said that the Mount Wellington club was changing its name to Otahuhu Rovers and this was approved by the Auckland Rugby League. He said that “the reorganised club was now in the hands of an efficient committee”. This was somewhat confusing as the Otahuhu club already existed, though they had been playing as a combined club with Ellerslie at the senior level in the 1931 season at the insistence of the league. The combined team was going to change its name from Ellerslie-Otahuhu to Ellerslie United.

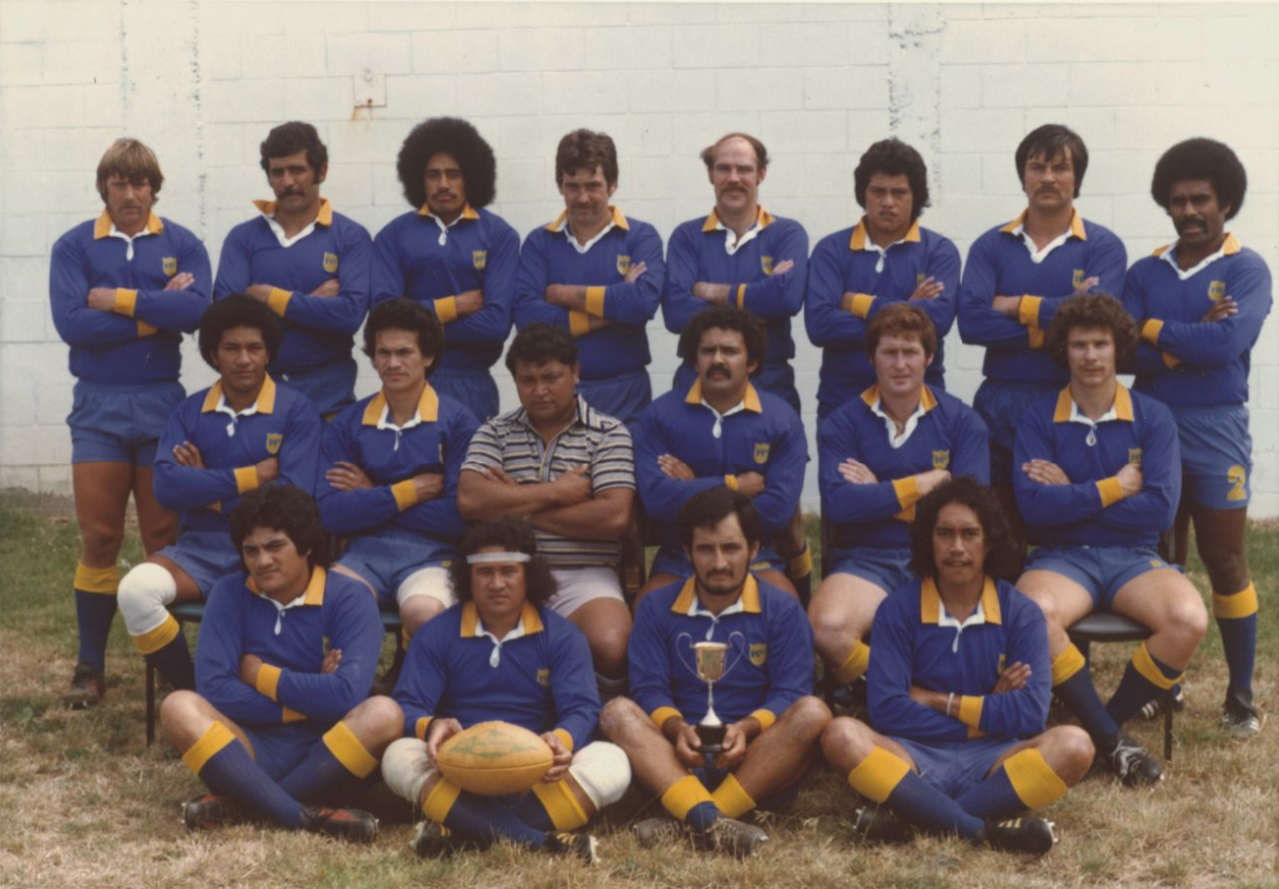
The Westfield senior side in 1978.

Rugby League then ceased to be played at Westfield. In 1948 another club was formed to represent Mount Wellington under that name and is still in existence to the present day though as of 2026 was only fielding Masters grade teams. While a Westfield meat works team was also formed and took part of Auckland Rugby League competitions in the 1970s.

=== Team records ===
==== Most senior team ====
The season record for the most senior team in the club.

Year	Grade	Club Name	Pld	W	D	L	PF	PA	PD	Pts	Position (Teams)
1929	2nd Grade	Mount Wellington	11	7	0	4	77	90	-13	14	4th of 7
1930	2nd Grade	Mount Wellington	10	3	0	7	55	117	-62	6	5th of 7
1931	2nd Grade	Mount Wellington	14	3	0	8	24	113	-89	6	6th of 8
1929-31	TOTAL	-	35	13	0	19	156	320	-164	26	

== Representative players ==
=== Auckland Juniors (second grade) ===
Player	Years	Games	Tries	Goals	Points
G. Jacobs	1929	2	0	0	0
