= Carl Eggen =

Australian rugby league footballer

Personal information
- Full name: Carl Hollingsworth Eggen
- Born: 3 February 1903 Paddington, New South Wales, Australia
- Died: 8 April 1985 (aged 82) Ramsgate, New South Wales, Australia

Playing information
- Position: Prop
Club
Years	Team	Pld	T	G	FG	P
1929–31	South Sydney	26	9	0	0	27

Carl Hollingsworth Eggen (1903–1985) was an Australian rugby league player who played in the 1920s and 1930s.

== Playing career ==
Eggen played three seasons with South Sydney from 1929 to 1931. He won two premierships with Souths, playing prop in the 1929 Grand Final and the 1931 Grand Final.

== Death ==
Eggen died on 8 April 1985, at Ramsgate, New South Wales.
