= Alf Binder =

Australian rugby league player

Personal information
- Full name: Alfred Binder

Playing information
- Position: Hooker, Prop, Second-row
Club
Years	Team	Pld	T	G	FG	P
1928–30	South Sydney	36	10	0	0	30

Alf Binder was an Australian rugby league footballer who played in the 1920s and 1930s. He played for South Sydney in the NSWRL competition during the club's first golden era.

== Playing career ==
Binder made his first grade debut for South Sydney against North Sydney at North Sydney Oval in Round 9 1928. Binder played in Souths 1928 grand final victory over arch rivals Eastern Suburbs which was played at the Royal Agricultural Society Grounds. The victory was Souths 4th premiership in a row.

In 1929, Binder played 17 games for Souths including the 1929 grand final victory over Newtown which Souths comprehensively won 30–10 at the Sydney Sports Ground.

Binder played one final season with Souths in 1930 before retiring at the end of the season. He later played for Goulburn.
