= Mount Wellington =

Mount Wellington may refer to:

== Mountains ==
- Mount Wellington (British Columbia), in Canada
- Mount Wellington (New York), in Otsego County, New York, United States
- Mount Wellington (Tasmania), in Hobart, Tasmania, Australia
- Mount Wellington (Victoria), in Victoria, Australia
- Maungarei / Mount Wellington, in Auckland, New Zealand

== Other ==
- University-Mount Wellington, a soccer club in Auckland
- Mount Wellington Tin Mine, near Truro in Cornwall
- Mount Wellington, New Zealand, a suburb in Auckland, New Zealand
