= Pat Smith =

Pat Smith may refer to:

- Pat Smith (wrestler) (born 1970), former collegiate wrestler and assistant coach
- Pat Falken Smith (1926–2001), television writer
- Pat Smith (soccer referee) (1923–2010), British-American soccer referee
- Cedric C. Smith (1895–1969), known as Pat, American football fullback
- Patricia Southall (born 1971), known as Pat Smith, American founder and spokesperson of Treasure You
- Pat Smith (rugby league), see Ireland national rugby league team

== See also ==
- Patrick Smith (disambiguation)
- Patricia Smith (disambiguation)
- Pat Smythe (1928–1996), British showjumper
- Pat Smythe (pianist) (1923–1983), jazz pianist
- Patrick Smyth (disambiguation)
- Patrick Smythe (disambiguation)
