= Tīpene / St Stephen's School =

School in Auckland, New Zealand

- Te Poho o Tīpene, the main Tīpene building, at Bombay, in 2026

Location
- 1832 Great South Road, Bombay; Auckland, 2675; New Zealand; 37°10′31.8″S 174°58′52.7″E

Information
- Other names: TIPENE; St Stephen's School; Te Kura o Tīpene
- Former name: St Stephen's Māori Boys School
- Type: Charter, boarding secondary school
- Motto: Māori: Titiro matatau ki te rangi (Steadfast towards excellence)
- Religious affiliation: Anglican
- Established: 1860; 166 years ago
- Sister school: Queen Victoria School (closed 2001)
- Oversight: St Stephen's Queen Victoria (SSQV) Trust Board
- Ministry of Education Institution no.: 3687
- Headmaster: Nathan Durie & Yvette McCausland-Durie
- Years: 9–13
- Gender: Boys
- Colours: Black and gold
- Yearbook: Tipene
- Website: tipene.co.nz

Tīpene / St Stephen's School (now called Tipene, and historically St Stephen's Māori Boys School) is an Anglican charter boarding secondary school for boys in Bombay, Auckland, New Zealand.

Tīpene / St Stephen's is one of New Zealand's oldest schools, predominantly serving Māori and Pasifika boys. It was established in 1844 and became a Māori girls' school in Parnell, Auckland, before becoming a boys-only Māori boarding school in 1860. In 1931 it moved to Bombay.

St Stephen's became a state school in 1973 and closed in 2000. It reopened as Tīpene / St Stephen's charter school in 2025.

== History ==
View of St Stephen's School from St Stephens Avenue, Parnell, Auckland, in 1903

St Stephen's was started in Te Araroa in 1844 as an Anglican mission school, then became a Māori girls' primary school in Taurarua / Parnell, Auckland, endowed with a 67 acre land grant by Governor Grey and established by Bishop Selwyn while the boys went to Selwyn's St John's College.

In 1860, St Stephen's became a Māori boys' boarding primary school. In the 1920s, the school developed a secondary department. In 1931 it moved to Bombay, in the south of Auckland, and the secondary roll grew steadily. From 1939 to 1945, during World War II, the school was requisitioned as a hospital, and students went to nearby schools. The school re-opened in 1949.

St Stephen's became a state school in 1973. It was known for its academic, cultural, and sporting achievements and produced prominent Māori leaders. However, the school was closed in 2000 by the board, church and Education Minister Trevor Mallard due to performance and financial concerns, and chronic bullying allegations. While it was closed, the site was used by the New Zealand Army for target practice, and as a film location for the Netflix series Sweet Tooth.

In 2024, the Te Pīhopatanga o Te Tai Tokerau diocese of the Anglican Church in Aotearoa, New Zealand and Polynesia gave its support to the reappointment of the board for the Auckland Anglican Māori boy's high school. In February 2025, the school reopened as Tīpene / St Stephen's School, operating under Associate Education Minister David Seymour's charter schools system. Te Tuara Trust was the school's governing body and the St Stephen's Queen Victoria Trust Board was the owner of the land and buildings. The school was a collaboration between the two trusts and Te Rauhitanga o te Mano o Tipene / St Stephens Old Boys Association. In 2025 and 2026, former student and principal of the school, Te Ururoa Flavell was the school board chairperson. The school's co-principals were past pupil, Nathan Durie and his wife Yvette McCausland-Durie.

In early 2026, a documentary called Tīpene – A Legacy Reborn, directed by Kimiora Kaire-Melbourne, presented the renewal and 2025 reopening of Tīpene / St Stephen's, including the volunteer work of the school's old boys association and the 13 large carvings that tohunga whakairo / master carver, Pakariki Harrison made for Te Poho o Tīpene, the main school building. In July 2026, the school opened Tīpene Archive, a dedicated archive room of photographs, taonga, records and stories to connect students with 180 years of Māori education history. Former student, Professor Te Kani Kingi led the project for over ten years.

== Administration ==
=== Headmasters / principals ===
Period	Headmaster / principal
1844–1871	Rev George Adam Kissling
1871–1904	John Edwin Davies
1905–1927	Albert Wilson
1927–1942	William Charles Morris
1948–1954	Patrick Smyth
1954–1971	Evan 'Joe' Lewis
1973–1984	Frank 'Scotty' McPherson
1996–1999	Te Ururoa Flavell
2025–present	Nathan Durie & Yvette McCausland-Durie

=== Chairmen of the school board ===
Period	Chairman of the school board
Late 1990s	Joe Harawira
2025–present	Te Ururoa Flavell

== Notable alumni ==
- Ngahiwi Apanui – Māori Language Commission head
- Frederick Bennett – Anglican bishop
- Alex Chan – Kiwis player
- Brendon Daniel – rugby player
- Te Ururoa Flavell – politician
- George Foote – radiologist
- Hone Kaa – Anglican minister
- Hōne Heke Ngāpua – politician
- Hone Harawira – politician
- Kīngi Īhaka – Anglican minister
- Shane Jones – politician
- Te Kani Kingi – professor
- Nuk Korako – politician
- Lee Lidgard – Māori All Blacks player
- Sidney Moko Mead – anthropologist and historian
- John Moorfield – scientist
- Tuku Morgan – politician
- Deon Muir – rugby player
- Colin Nicholson – lawyer and judge
- Selwyn Parata – Māori leader
- Māui Pōmare – medical doctor and politician
- Jim Rukutai – rugby player
- Te Waihoroi Shortland – broadcaster
- Dallas Seymour – All Blacks player
- Patrick Smyth – educator
- Kīngi Tūheitia – Māori King
- Joe Warbrick – All Blacks player

== Gallery ==
Mr John Edwin Davies, headmaster 1871–1904, and pupils at St Stephen's, Parnell, in about 1883

Governor General Lord Bledisloe, Lady Bledisloe and Archbishop Averil, with some of the pupils, staff and officials, Bombay, 1932

Te Poho o Tīpene, St Stephen's main building, Bombay, 1940

Waitoa, Te Poho o Tīpene and gymnasium buildings, Bombay, 2026

Tīpene carving, grounds and buildings, 2026

Tīpene School panorama view, 2026
