= Natalie Simon =

American soccer referee

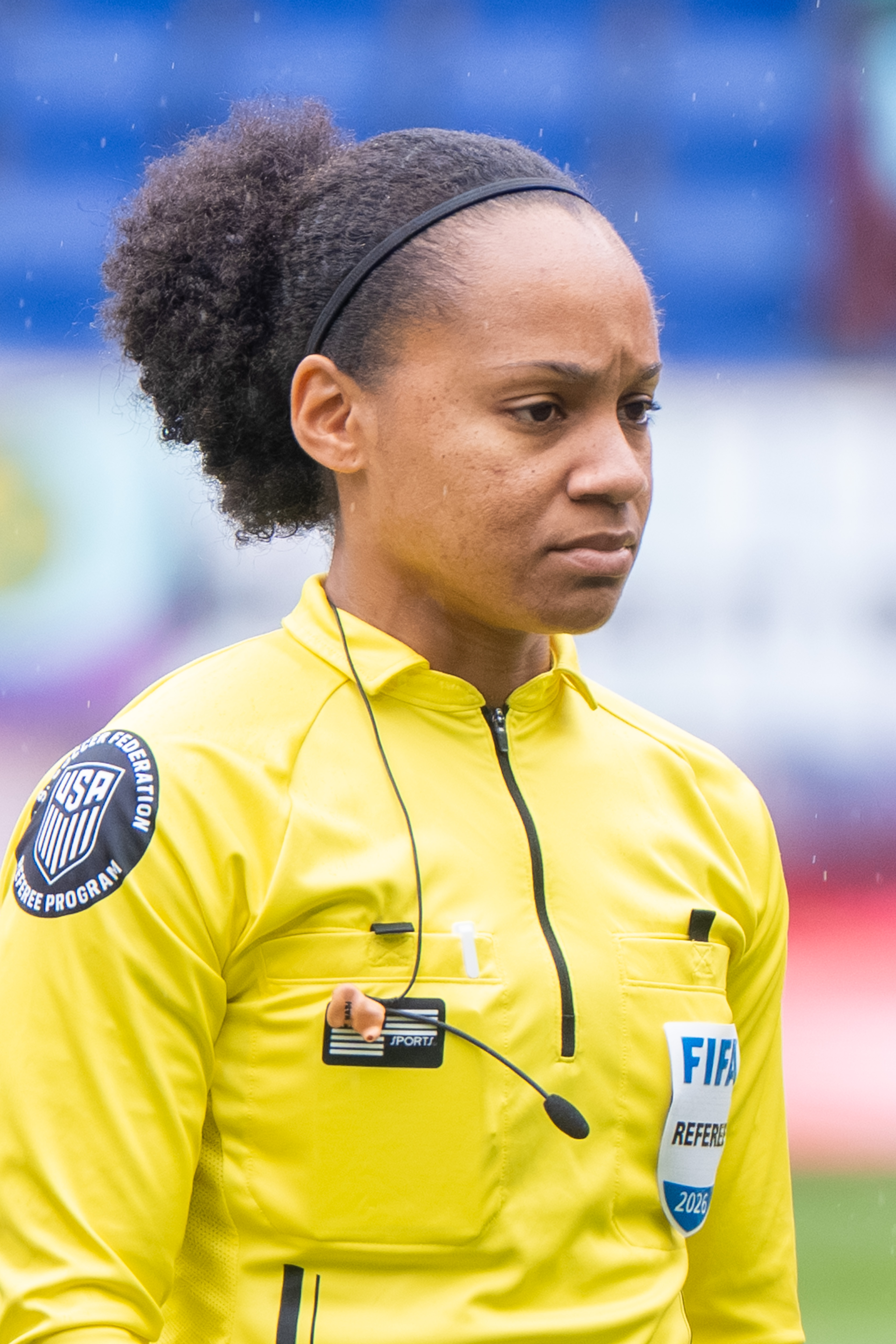
- Simon refereeing an NWSL match in April 2026
- Born: Louisiana, US

Domestic
Years	League	Role
2020–	MLS	Fourth official
2023–	MLS Next Pro	Referee

International
Years	League	Role
2022–	FIFA listed	Referee

Natalie Simon (born ca. 1989) is an American international soccer referee for the Professional Referee Organization of the United States. In 2022, she became one of four American women to hold a FIFA international refereeing badge, and the first African-American woman to do so.

== Early life ==
Simon was born in Louisiana, the descendant of slaves on both sides of her family, and is of Choctaw Native American heritage from her maternal great-grandmother. She began playing soccer at age 8 while still in Louisiana, then later attended high school and played travel team soccer in Fort Lauderdale, Florida.

Simon went to college at Stetson University, where she also played soccer as a forward. Simon described her career as a player as being "a referee's worst nightmare... If I made it through a game without a yellow card, it was a good day." An assistant coach at Stetson was a referee assessor and recommended officiating to Simon as a way to remain engaged with soccer after graduation.

== Career ==
=== Collegiate soccer ===
Simon joined the National Intercollegiate Soccer Officials Association (NISOA) in 2015, which named her Region VI (Georgia, Florida, North Carolina, South Carolina) Referee of the Year in 2019.

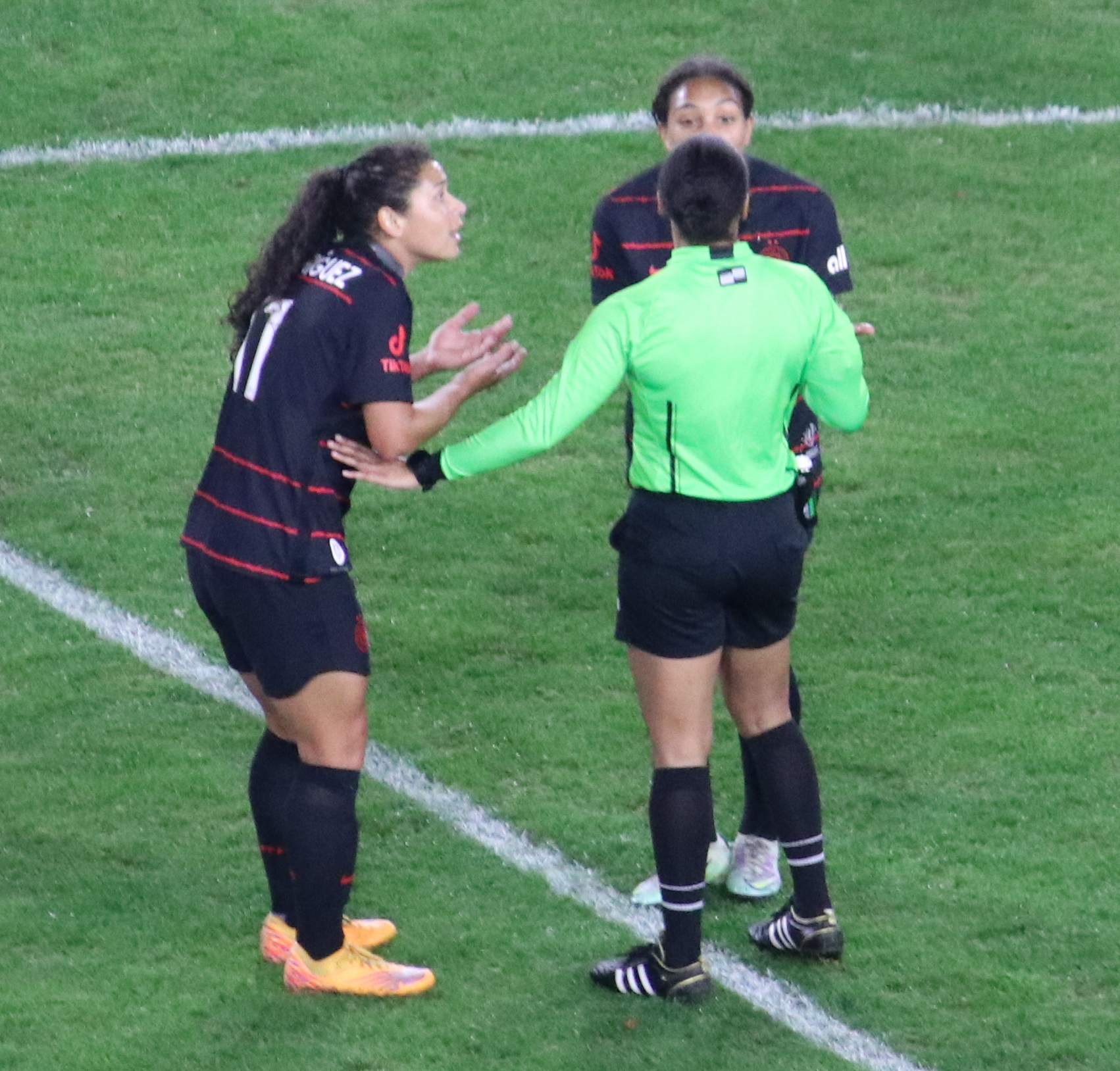
Simon officiated the 2022 National Women's Soccer League championship match between Portland Thorns FC and Kansas City Current.

=== National Women's Soccer League (NWSL) ===
On May 8, 2021, Simon officiated the 2021 NWSL Challenge Cup Championship, her first assignment for a tournament's finals. On October 29, 2022, Simon officiated the 2022 NWSL championship match. She was named the 2025 NWSL referee of the year.

=== Major League Soccer (MLS) ===
On September 16, 2023, Simon was assigned her first match as a referee in Major League Soccer. She took charge of the match between the San Jose Earthquakes and Real Salt Lake. She was the first black woman to ever referee an MLS match.

=== International officiating ===
In August 2019, Simon was one of 12 referees to participate in Concacaf's Program of Refereeing Excellence.

On April 12, 2022, Simon officiated her first United States women's national soccer team match as a center referee.

On January 4, 2023, the United States Soccer Federation Referee Committee and FIFA re-appointed Simon to the 2023 FIFA Panel to officiate international matches. That list included Alyssa Nichols, the second Black American woman to earn a FIFA badge, who viewed Simon as a role model.

Simon was appointed the 2026 Women's U-17 World Cup Final between Japan and Nigeria.
