= Selwyn Parata =

New Zealand Māori leader

Sir Selwyn Parata KNZM
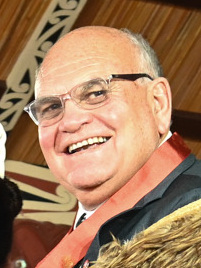
- Parata in 2024
- Born: Selwyn Tanetoa Parata; 1956 or 1957 (age 69–70); Waipiro Bay, New Zealand
- Education: Ngata Memorial College; St Stephen’s College
- Known for: Service to Māori
- Notable work: Board chair of Ngāti Porou; Board chair of Te Matatini
- Spouse: Amohaere Houkamau
- Children: 4
- Relatives: Hekia Parata (sister); Wira Gardiner (brother-in-law); Arnold Reedy (grandfather); Materoa Reedy (great-grandmother); Tame Parata (great-great-grandfather)

Sir Selwyn Tanetoa Parata KNZM (born 1956 or 1957) is a New Zealand Māori leader. He has served as chair of the Ngāti Porou tribal authority, Te Rūnanganui o Ngāti Porou, since 2014.

== Biography ==
Parata was born at Waipiro Bay in about 1956, the oldest child of Ron Parata and Hiria Reedy. His siblings include the former National Party cabinet minister and diplomat, Hekia Parata. Through his father, he affiliates to Ngāi Tahu, while on his mother's side he is of Ngāti Porou descent.

Parata was educated at Ngata Memorial College in Ruatoria and at St Stephen's College near Bombay. After leaving school, he worked in various jobs before being appointed as the cultural officer for the Gisborne region in the Department of Maori Affairs when he was 25 years old. He married Amohaere Houkamau, and the couple went on to have four children.

In 1987, Parata was elected a trustee of Te Rūnanga o Ngāti Porou, and has served on that body and its successor, Te Rūnanganui o Ngāti Porou, ever since, becoming chair of the latter in 2014. He has also been chair of Te Matatini since 2008, as well as chair of Te Pīhopatanga o Aotearoa also since 2014.

== Honours ==
In the 2023 King's Birthday and Coronation Honours, Parata was appointed a Knight Companion of the New Zealand Order of Merit, for services to Māori.
