= Colin Nicholson =

New Zealand lawyer and jurist

The Honourable Colin Nicholson CNZM QC

Judge of the High Court of New Zealand
- In office 1998–2009

Judge of the Cook Islands High Court
- In office 2005–2012

Personal details
- Born: Colin Maurice Nicholson; 21 June 1936 Turua, New Zealand
- Died: 31 October 2015 (aged 79) Auckland, New Zealand
- Education: Auckland University College

Colin Maurice Nicholson CNZM QC (21 June 1936 – 31 October 2015) was a New Zealand lawyer and jurist. He served as a judge of the High Court of New Zealand from 1998 until 2009. He also served as a justice of the High Court of the Cook Islands from his appointment in April 2005 until his retirement in May 2012. In 2011, Nicholson became the first judge to prosecute citizens of the Cook Islands for counterfeit DVD piracy.

== Biography ==
Nicholson was born in Turua, a small village on New Zealand's Hauraki Plains, on 21 June 1936. He received his education at St Stephen's School in Bombay and at Thames High School, before studying at Auckland University College, from where he graduated with a Bachelor of Laws in 1960. Later that year he was admitted as a barrister and solicitor of the High Court of New Zealand (at that time known as the Supreme Court). He was appointed Queen's Counsel in 1979, and served as the vice president of the New Zealand Law Society from 1989 to 1990. In 1990, Nicholson was awarded the New Zealand 1990 Commemoration Medal.

During his career as a barrister, Nicholson appeared in some of New Zealand's most high-profile cases, including the Bassett Road machine gun murders trials (as a junior to prosecutor Sir Graham Speight), and as defence counsel in the trial of David Wayne Tamihere for the murder of Urban Höglin and Heidi Paakkonen.

Nicholson worked on commissions of inquiry, including the 1973 inquiry into the "Parnell fumes panic", and the inquiry into the cancer treatment methods of Milan Brych. He also represented the estates of passengers killed in the crash of Air New Zealand Flight 901 at the subsequent Royal Commission in 1980, and reported on the fatal shooting of Paul Chase by police in 1983.

He was appointed as a District Court judge in 1995 and a Youth Court judge in 1996. In 1998, Nicholson was appointed as a judge of the High Court of New Zealand, and remained on the bench until 2009. In the 2006 Queen's Birthday Honours, Nicholson was appointed a Companion of the New Zealand Order of Merit, for services as a judge of the High Court. On 5 May 2008, on his retirement as a High Court judge, he was granted retention of the title The Honourable for life.

In April 2005, Nicholson was appointed to the High Court of the Cook Islands, and oversaw a range of both civil and criminal trials during his tenure. He proposed a legislative amendment following a legal drafting error that almost led to the dismissal of charges against a defendant accused of growing cannabis.

In 2009 and 2010, Nicholson presided over the longest criminal trial in the history of the Cook Islands, which became known as "Operation Slush". Three defendants—Norman George, Chris Vaile and Charles Koronui—faced numerous conspiracy and corruption charges spanning from 1999 to 2002, but were all acquitted in April 2010.

In 2011, Nicholson became the first judge to prosecute Cook Islanders for DVD piracy. He also presided over the trial of Tea O Tangaroa Tekeu Uea, a Cook Islands Christian Church minister accused of the indecent assault of three teenage girls.

Nicholson retired from the High Court of the Cook Islands in May 2012. He also served as the chairman of the Cook Islands Media Council.

Nicholson died in Takapuna on 31 October 2015 at the age of 79.
