= Patrick Smith =

Patrick Smith may refer to:

== Writers ==
- Patrick Smith (journalist) (1952–2023), Australian sports journalist who wrote for The Australian
- Patrick Smith (columnist), American author and pilot
- Patrick D. Smith (1927–2014), Florida author who wrote A Land Remembered
- Patrick Sean Smith, American television show creator, writer, and producer
- Patrick Smith, editor of Africa Confidential newsletter

== Others ==
- Patrick Smith (fighter) (1963–2019), boxer, kickboxer and mixed martial artist
- Patrick Smith (politician) (1901–1982), Irish politician who served in Dáil Éireann
- Patrick Smith (artist) (born 1972), American artist and animator
- Patrick Henry Smith (1827–1884), Wisconsin merchant and legislator
- J. Que (Patrick Smith, born 1975), American record producer and songwriter
- Patrick Smith (skateboarder), American skateboarder and skate company owner
- Patrick Smith (field hockey), English field hockey player

== See also ==
- Pat Smith (disambiguation)
- Paddy Smith (disambiguation)
- Patrick Smyth (disambiguation)
- Patrick Smythe (disambiguation)
