= Patricia Smith =

Patricia Smith may refer to:

- Patricia Smith (bowls) (1920–2017), Australian lawn bowler
- Patricia Smith (poet) (born 1955), American poet and writer
- Tricia Smith (born 1957), Canadian rower and lawyer
- Patricia Smith, Viscountess Hambleden (1904–1994), Lady of the Bedchamber to Queen Elizabeth
- Patricia Anne Smith (born 1943), former politician in Saskatchewan, Canada
- Patricia Haynes Smith (born 1946), member of the Louisiana House of Representatives
- Patricia Hornsby-Smith, Baroness Hornsby-Smith (1914–1985), British politician
- Patricia Spafford Smith (1925–2002), American businesswoman and politician
- M. Patricia Smith (born circa 1952), American labor lawyer and government official
- Patricia Smith (actress) (1930–2011), movie and television actress
- Patricia Southall (born 1971), later Smith, founder and spokesperson of Treasure You
- Patricia M. Smith (born c. 1953), associate justice of the Supreme Court of Alabama

== See also ==
- Patti Grace Smith (1947–2016), United States Federal Aviation Administration (FAA) official
- Patti Smith (born 1946), American singer-songwriter and poet
- Patti Smith (politician) (1946–2017), politician in Oregon
- Patty Smyth (born 1957), American singer and songwriter, leader of the rock band Scandal
- Patricia Smyth (judge), Northern Irish judge
- Patty Hill (Patty Smith Hill, 1868–1946), American educator
- Pat Smith (disambiguation)
