= Māngere United League Football Club =

Defunct NZ rugby league club, based in Auckland

Māngere United
Club information
- Full name: Māngere United League Football Club
- Nickname(s): Māngere Māori, Māngere Rangers
- Short name: Māngere
- Colours: Maroon and Gold (Māngere Rangers), Black and Green (Māngere United)
- Founded: 1915
- Exited: 1934

Former details
- Grounds: Māngere Domain; Onehunga Recreation Ground (Waikaraka Park); Ōtāhuhu Trotting Ground; Te Papapa Reserve + Pukaki Farm (training)
- Coach: Jim Rukutai
- Manager: various
- Captain: various
- Competition: Auckland Rugby League

Records
- Premierships: (1) 1933 (2nd Gr.)
- Foster Shield (2nd Gr. knockout): (4) 1922, 1923, 1932, 1933

The Mangere United League Football Club was a rugby league club which existed from 1915 to 1934 when they ceased to exist at the end of the season. They competed in the Auckland Rugby League competitions, predominantly in the lower grades. and were based in the Māngere suburb of Auckland, New Zealand. The club was predominantly made up of Māori players which was unique for the rugby league code in the Auckland region in its early decades.

== History ==
=== 1915-16 Māngere Rangers formation and hiatus ===
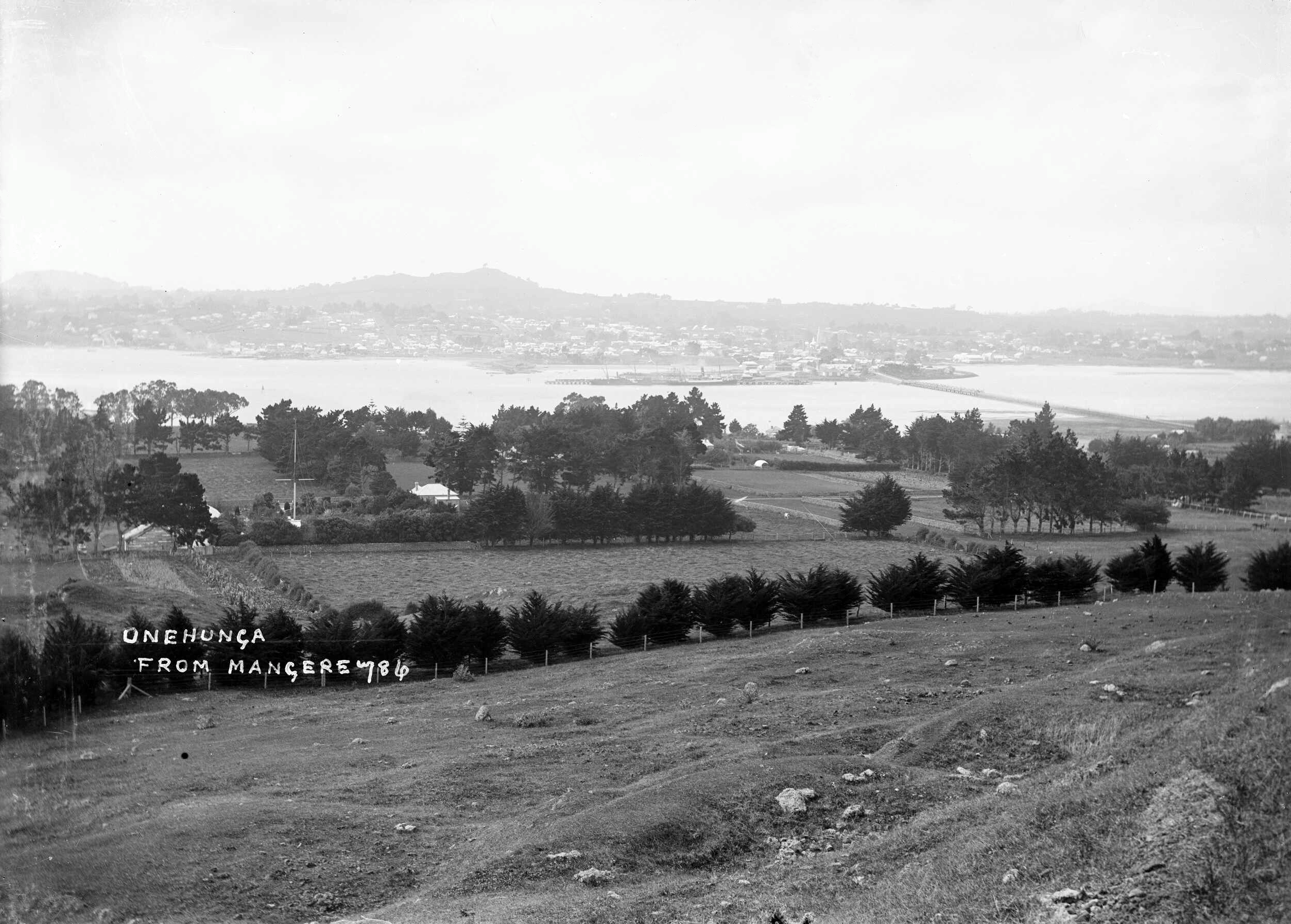
Māngere Bridge in the foreground looking across to Onehunga. The Māngere club played matches on both sides of the bridge throughout their existence.

On April 7, 1915 it was reported in the New Zealand Herald that "correspondence was received notifying that a league club had been formed at Māngere, and a team would be entered for one of the competitions". The club was named 'Māngere Rangers' and they applied for registration at the April 14 Auckland Rugby League board meeting and it was approved the same evening. It was said that the Māngere Rangers were "composed of Maoris [sic], who will play in the first junior grade". Their first club secretary was A. Te Mete who was based at 5 Rew's Chambers. They were due to play their first ever game against Remuera on May 8 at Otahuhu #3 field. However the match never took place with the opposition defaulting. Their first ever team published in the New Zealand Herald was: H. Matekohe, William Kipa, R. Williams, Jack Pai, K. Watene, R. Waka, J. Hutukawa, W. Maki, John Wilson, H. Rau, B. Rau, Brown Watene, Jack (Hone) Pai, Tommy Pai, T. Edwards, S. Reweti, Scoby, T.K. Thompson, and Te Mete. They were named to play Remuera again on May 15 and won by 13 points to 8. On May 29 they were defeated by Thames Old Boys 17-0 but Thames had played a first grade player and so Māngere were awarded the match.

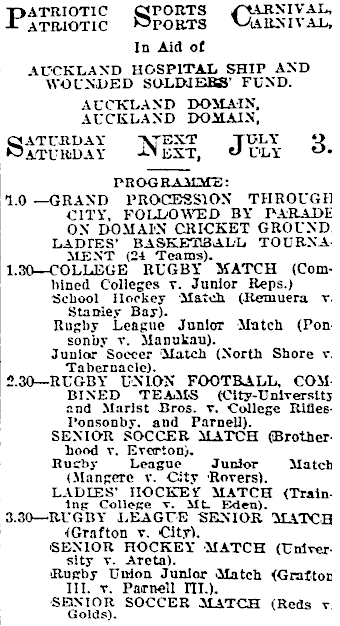
Patriotic Carnival Match with Māngere v City

On July 3 they were chosen to play a match against City Rovers at Auckland Domain as part of the Patriotic Sports Carnival. Māngere lost the match 8 to 5. It was said that it "proved a good exhibition, and was hard fought throughout. City's tries were scored by Hogan and Tom Sheehan, while [future New Zealand international], Bill Davidson converted one". For Māngere their first ever ‘reported' scorers were Turner (try), and Brown (conversion). It was said that "Marrell, at full for the Māoris, played his first game in this position, and showed good promise. He is very fast and sound, and proved himself a good try getter. Brown Watene, five eighths, was also good, and Tommy Pai, centre three-quarter. The other players were undoubtedly sound, but do not seem to combine as well as they should. The average weight of the team is about 11 stone, and if they learn the finer points of the game will be hard to beat for the junior championship".

On August 7 their game against Thames at Victoria Park became marred in controversy. The referee, Mr. Whitley "complained that he had to stop the game after 40 minutes play on account of the Māngere team's misconduct. No fewer than four Thames Old Boys players were carried off the field through injuries caused by the Māngere players. Had he not stopped the match the spectators would have taken charge and there would have been serious trouble. The incidents at the match were sufficiently serious to suggest the deletion of the Māngere team from the competition, but it was considered advisable that inquiries should be made with a view to exonerating one or two of the players. In addition to [William] Kipa and Tommy Pai, who were held to be blameless by the referee". It was decided by the Auckland Rugby League to suspend the team until the names of those "who were responsible for the trouble were supplied". At the August 18 meeting of the league it was decided to suspend John Mackay, John Wilson, and Waewae for a year each. The Māngere secretary, A. Te Mete had been the official time keeper, and wrote to the league to say "he thought the referee did not take the proper steps to rectify the wrong which led to the disqualification of the Māngere club. In no case did he ask for information that would lead to getting the names of any of the players who were playing roughly or otherwise, but simply stopped the game. He thought the club should be permitted to finish the competition. The club was willing to withdraw" the three named players, "who he believed were the cause of the whole trouble. He could not see why the team should suffer for the wrong done by a few". The league agreed and after disqualifying the three players for 12 months they permitted the team to finish the season.

In the 1915 2nd grade championship the side finished in third position out of 8 teams with a record of 10 games played, 6 wins, 4 losses, for 57 points, against 108 points. Jack Pai was their only player to gain representative selection, though it was only as an emergency player for the Auckland Junior side to play Waikato Juniors on September 11 and he was not required to take the field.

The 1916 season saw Māngere enter a side in the second grade once more. However they withdrew from the competition after defaulting their round one match to Grafton Athletic and their round two match to Ponsonby United. Māngere wrote a letter to the Auckland Rugby League which was received on June 15 that they had "ceased to be a club" and it was stated that "the old members were now free to join other clubs". At the start of the following season in their annual report by the Auckland Rugby League it was stated that "owing to call of the Empire, Māngere, Remuera, and Northcote withdrew from the competitions".

=== 1918-23 Rebuilding ===
On April 10 in 1918 the ARL received an indication that the Māngere club had reformed, as had the Manukau Rovers (Magpies) club which was based in the nearby Onehunga area. They applied for affiliation on April 17 which was approved and their colours were registered as maroon and gold. They had 23 players registered with their club. At the May 1 meeting of the Auckland Rugby League the Mangere club requested permission to use blue jerseys instead of maroon and gold for this season and the request was granted. They fielded a side in the second grade competition but very few results were reported during the year so it is unknown what their record was or where they finished in the five team competition other than the fact that they did not win it.

On August 17 Māngere was given permission to travel to Helensville to play a game there. At the same meeting it was also decided to play the Māngere v City second grade match as curtain raiser to the Maritime v Newton Rangers Roope Rooster semi final at the Auckland Domain on August 24. The Māngere team list for the match was Thomas Pai, Jack Pai, and a third Pai brother, H. Matekohe, William Kipa, T. Preston, W. Hapi, P. Tutaki, P. Poutu, K. Wiremu, P. Tamihana, R. Tamihana, P. Hira, H. Brady, E. Hikutaia, R. Tahu, T. Wera, W. Pita, W. Rangi, and T. Huitorou.

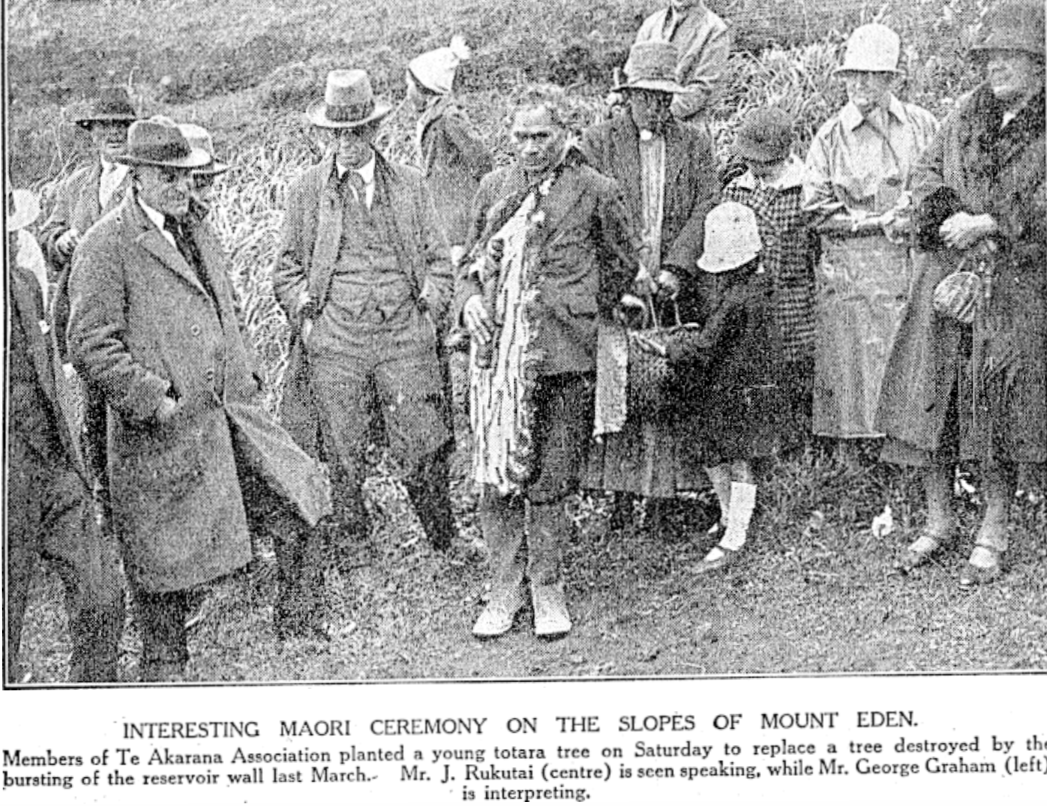
Jim Rukutai, their coach from 1919 onwards.

The 1919 season saw Māngere once again field a second grade side. The reporting of results was again poor however there were more than the previous season with Māngere winning 1 of the 5 matches reported. They were coached by Jim (Puhipi James) Rukutai, a well known former New Zealand international who would go on to coach the New Zealand side 2 years later in 1921, and New Zealand Māori in 1922 and 1937. The Observer newspaper wrote on May 31 that "Big Rukutai was made a presentation on Saturday by his pet coachees, the Māngere Rangers. This nippy team of Māori boys are putting in some good work this year". Their team lists showed some of the same players from the 1918 side but with several new players: 2 Rau brothers, 3 Pai brothers, 2 Wilson brothers, P. Thompson, T. Robert, Ngapera, Broughton, W. Edward, William Kipa, Poutai Rewha, 2 Wihone brothers, P. Tutaki, Hikutaia, Tom (Hauwhenua) Kirkwood, W. Edward, Ewera, Newton, and J. Hira. On October 25 the Māngere side played against Tuakau at the later teams ground.

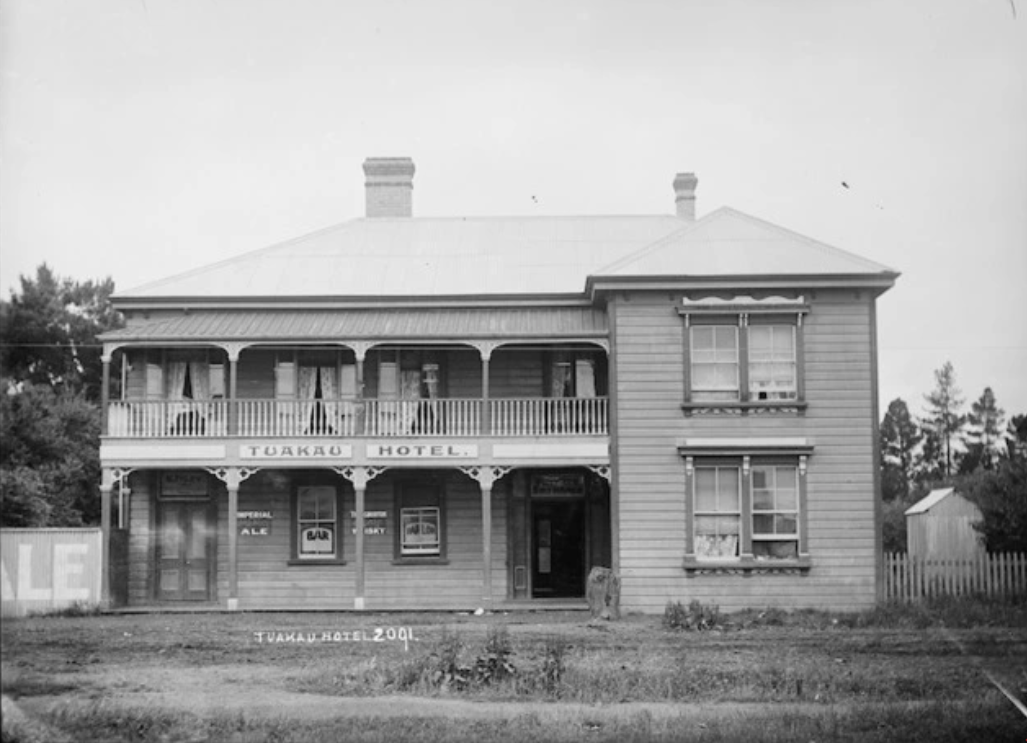
Tuakau Hotel in the early 1900s.

The "Māngere Maoris" as named in the Pukekohe & Waiuku Times won 16 points to 8 before being "treated to a dinner at the hotel by the home team". Earlier in the season on August 18 Jack Pai was selected in a 15 man squad to play for Auckland Juniors against Hawke's Bay at Napier on August 30 in the backs. He was unavailable to go and J. Wilson of the Māngere side was pulled into the squad.

The 1920 season saw the Māngere side struggling. They fielded one team in the second grade but only had 3 of their 11 results reported (2 losses and 1 win), before they withdrew after round 11. Then in 1921 they failed to field any sides whatsoever.

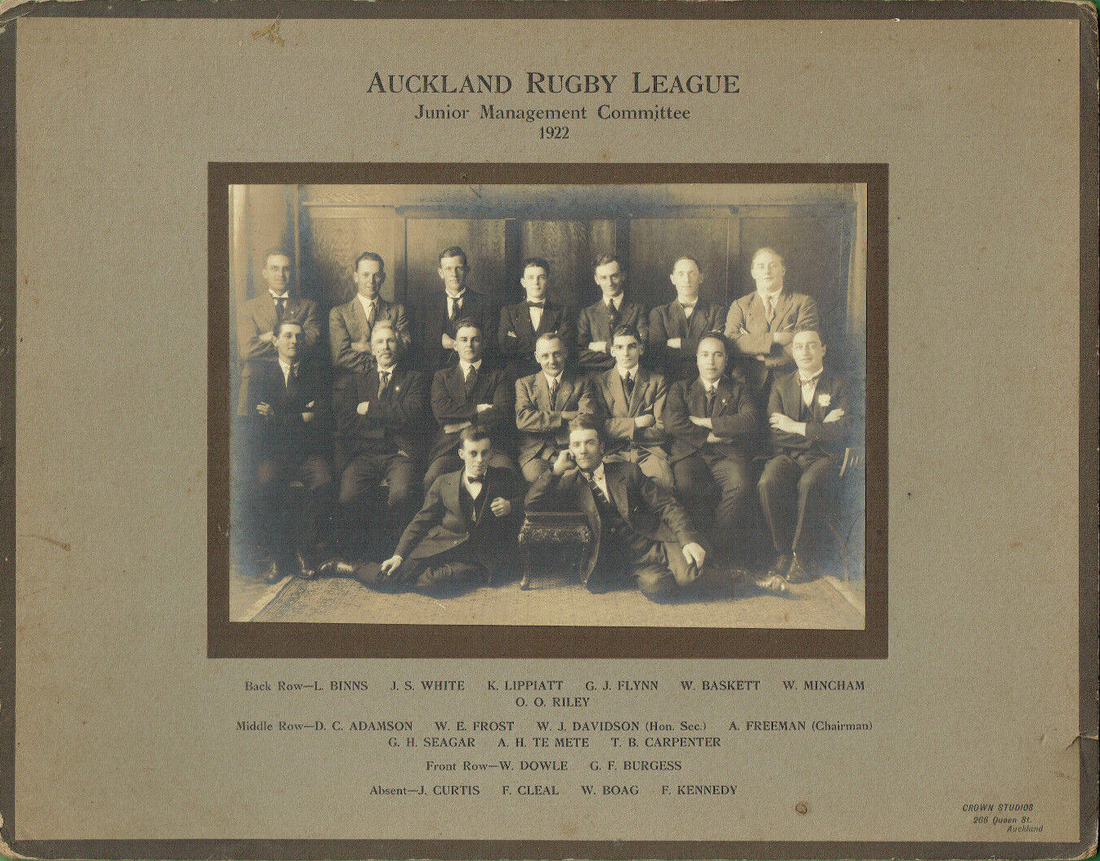
A.H. Te Mete, Māngere representative on the Auckland RL Junior Management Committee in 1922

The 1922 season saw something of a revival. They once again took the field in the second grade and finished mid table out of 13 teams with a 3 win, 1 draw and 4 loss record from the 8 scores reported. An Ihumatao team from the broader Māngere area also entered a side in the competition and were also largely made up of Māori players. It was reported at the start of the 1922 season that the league had made use of a private ground at Māngere, possibly farm land at Pukaki which the Māngere club used around this time in their history.

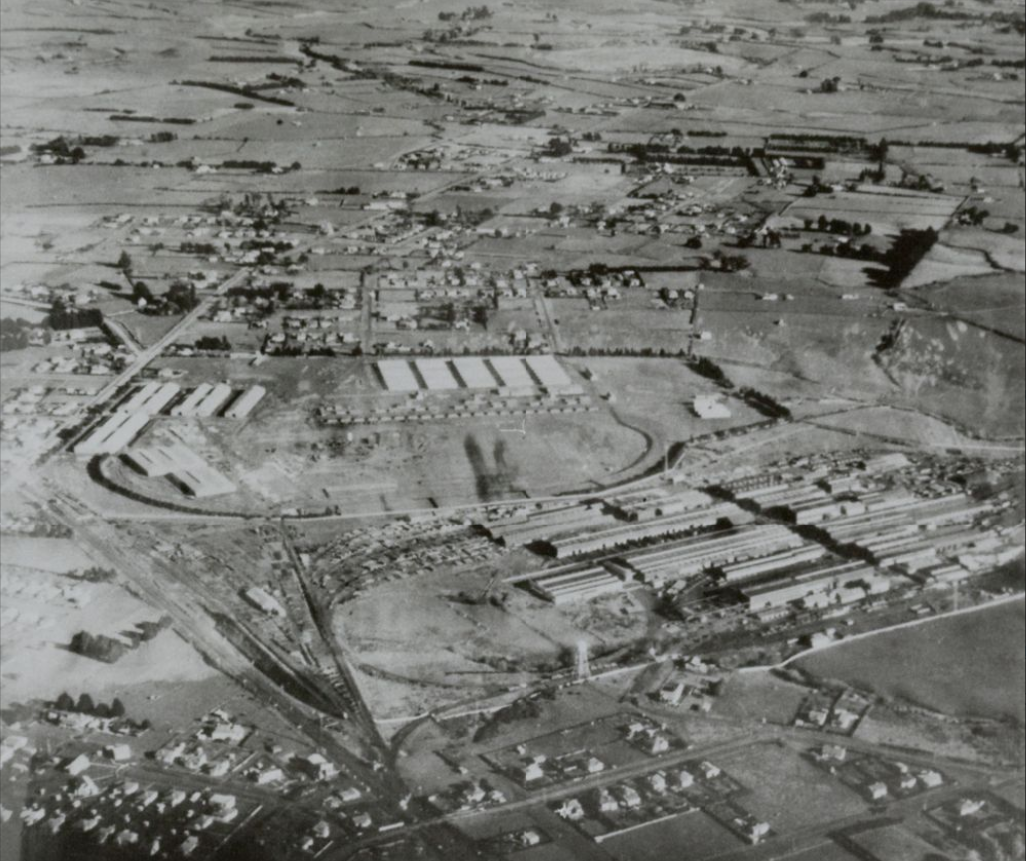
The Otahuhu Trotting Ground in 1944 where Māngere had played matches in the 1920s and 30s.

On the night of April 13 the club held a "special meeting" at Onehunga. In mid May it was reported that the inner fields of the Ōtāhuhu Trotting Club were being used for sports and along with 4 grounds being available for rugby and 3 for soccer there was 1 available for rugby league. The trotting club was located a few hundred metres to the west of present day King's College in Ōtāhuhu. Their best win in the championship came on June 17 when they defeated City Rovers 8-3 at the Trotting Ground. City went on to win the competition.

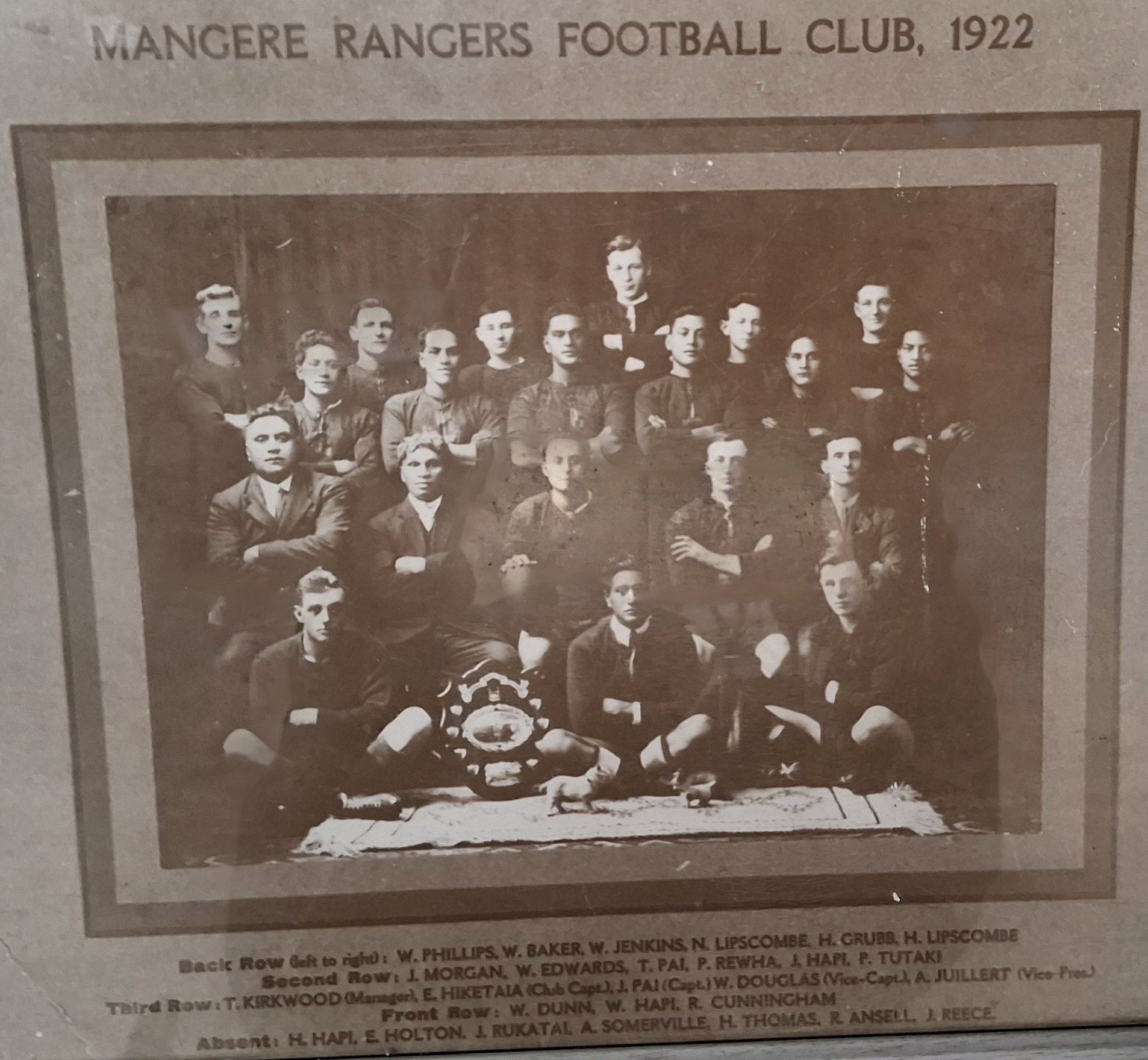
Mangere Rangers with the Foster Memorial Shield for winning the knockout competition in 1922.

On October 28 Māngere won their first ever title when they beat Newton Rangers 19-11 at Manukau (Onehunga) to claim the Foster (Memorial) Shield.

Jack Pai was selected at centre for the Auckland Junior representative side to play the Wednesday Representative team on September 16 which was curtain raiser to the Auckland v New South Wales match at the Auckland Domain.

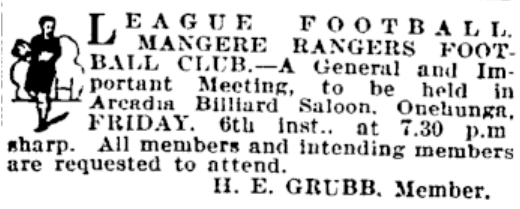
1923 Māngere annual meeting newspaper notice

Māngere were again very competitive in the 1923 second grade competition. They finished runner up to City Rovers in a 12 team competition. They lost the final to City on September 1 by 16 points to 3 and finished the season 1 point behind them with a 10 win, 3 loss record. They had led by 4 points late in the season though City had games in hand which they won before beating Māngere. Earlier in the season they had drawn with City 6-6 but were awarded the match after City had fielded an ineligible player. Their team for the season was Harold J.L. Lipscombe (who was their captain), Tommy Pai, W. Lipscombe, Jack Pai, W. Phillips, Harold Edward Grubb, P. Tutaki, Arthur Roy Ansell, J. Reece, J. Hapi, W. Hapi, W. Douglas, W. Dunn, W. Edwards, W. Baker, and Poutai Rewha. The club also fielded a 4th grade team for the first time. They only had 2 scores reported during the season, both losses. The team included the names Arthur (Henry) Filmer, H. Tutaki, Albert Grubb, John Gill, Alfred Harold Sneyd, P. Walsh, V. Goodwin, W. Jenkins, Whakahau Tīpene (Roy) Wattie (Wati), A. Baker, R. Rennie, J. Glasgow, Moorhouse, W. Nickless, G. Young, and V. Wilson.

Their 1923 annual meeting had been held at the Arcadia Billiard Saloon in Onehunga on Friday, April 6. The secretary was Harold Edward Grubb who was also a player. Once again Jim Rukutai was coaching the side. He had applied for a regrading of his playing grade so that he could play for the 2nd grade side however it was declined by the Auckland Rugby League as they considered him a 1st grade player and too good for the grade. Towards the end of the season on August 29 it was reported that the Māngere club and Manukau Rovers intended to enter a combined senior team in the 1st grade competition for the 1924. However they must have changed their mind at a later date as they both fielded separate teams. They also were prepared to enter a combined side for the 1923 Roope Rooster competition at the end of the season but "the proposition could not be entertained by the league". On September 15 the Māngere second grade side defeated Ōtāhuhu by 48 points to 15 in the knockout competition which they went on to win, with every single Māngere played reported to have scored. At the end of the season centre Tommy Pai, wing B Potai, halfback W. Harper, and second row forward Arthur Ansell were selected in the Auckland Junior representative side to play their Lower Waikato counterparts at Ngaruawahia.

=== 1924 Year in first grade ===
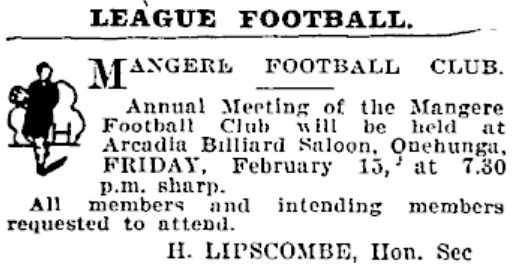
1924 Annual meeting notice

The 1924 season was to be the most significant in their history as they were admitted into the 1st grade competition for the Monteith Shield. They also changed their name to 'Māngere United' which they remained until their final year. They once again held their annual meeting at the Arcadia Billiard Saloon in Onehunga which was owned by club official Thomas (Hauwhenua) Kirkwood, on February 15, with Harold Lipscombe their honorary secretary. They began to be named as 'Māngere United' consistently from this point onwards in the 1924 season. In March they applied for the use of the Te Papapa Reserve for the season. It is the present day Ferguson Park where the Te Papapa Rugby Club are located in Onehunga. Curiously this was quite some distance from Māngere but perhaps preferred due to its closer proximity to the other 1st grade clubs in the competition. The Onehunga Borough Council decided to give 2 fields to the Manukau Rovers rugby club, and the number 3 field to the Māngere side with the Onehunga Athletic Association getting the number 4 field.

At the 14th annual meeting of the Auckland Rugby League on March 18 a suggestion was made "that the number of senior teams be increased and that there was not a senior team east of Queen Street. Māngere and Ellerslie could provide good senior teams". It was then decided that the committee would consider the matter. Three weeks later on April 9 the Māngere and Ellerslie clubs asked for permission to enter teams in the 1st grade senior competition and it was decided that both teams would be accepted into the competition which was expanding from 7 teams to 9.

Their colours were registered as black and green and their first match was to be at Carlaw Park on April 26 at 1.30pm on the #1 field against Ponsonby United. Jim Rukutai was the Māngere club member elected to represent them on the Auckland Rugby League management committee. They had been training on their ground at Pukaki in Māngere and the New Zealand Herald said the "evergreen Jim Rukutai is taking a special interest and pride in the Māngere United thirteen, and confidently expresses the opinion that his side will not be one of the three teams to drop out at the end of the first round. This team is fortunate in having such a staunch and able sponsor, and should show the effects of his coaching and advice when it opposes Ponsonby on April 26".

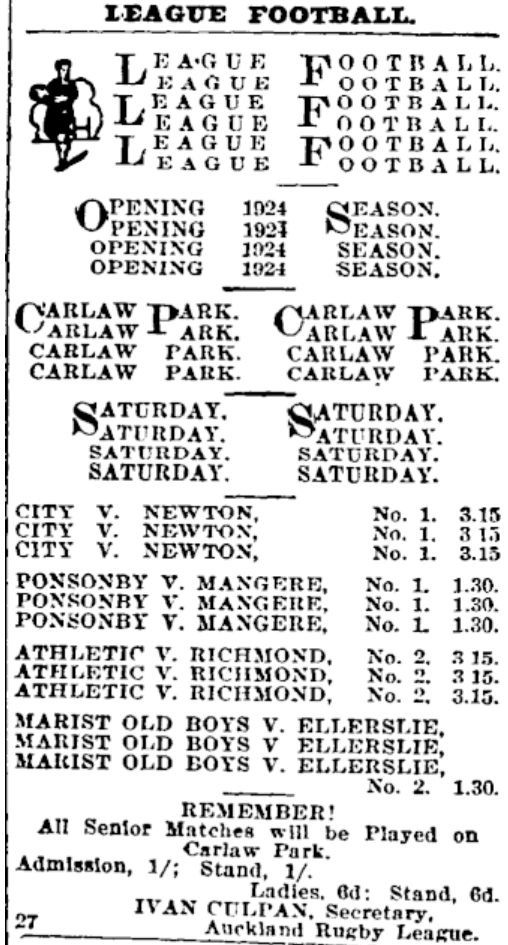
Advertisement for their first ever game as a 1st grade side in 1924

They lost their first match with Ponsonby 24-5 before a crowd of 4,500 at Carlaw Park with lock Jack Pai scoring their try and Lipscombe kicking a goal. Their team for their first ever 1st grade match was Lipscombe at fullback, M. Paul, Tommy Pau, and Poutai in the three quarters, Tutaki at second five eighth, Digger at first five eighth, W. Hapi halfback, Peter and Roberts were props, with Harold Lipscombe at hooker, Arthur Ansell and Roberts in the second row and Jack Pai at lock. It was said that "although well defeated they hung on gamely, and much better can reasonably be expected from them before the end of the season". Their backline was "individually very fair, particularly Digger and Tutaki" but they spent too many opportunities kicking at goal from free kicks instead of attacking with the ball. Tommy Pai came on during the game to replace his brother Jack who went off injured. The Auckland Star reported that "in Paul, the Māngere team has the makings of a useful three-quarter, but owing to the absence of programmes and numbered jerseys, it was difficult to follow the individual efforts of the players". Due to Mangere becoming a 1st grade side all of their players had to be re-registered and on April 13 the following players were promoted to first grade players for the Māngere side: Jim Rukutai, Pautareys, Poutai Rewha, J Hapi, Norman Ernest Lipscombe, Jack Pai, Tommy Pai, W. Hapi, P. Tutaki, Arthur Roy Ansell, Ernest Ruby, A. Lipscombe, A. Mansill, M. Gubb, John Norton, J. Brien.

Young was appointed their delegate to the management committee for the year. In their match with Athletic on April 10 at Victoria Park they played one man short, with the missing player being Wilson who was "one of their best backs". They ultimately lost 14-6 with their points coming in the second half to a try for Rukutai and another to Paul which had made the scored 11-6.

Māngere's first ever first grade win came against Newton Rangers on May 24 on the Carlaw Park number 2 field. They thrashed their opponents 35 points to 10 with tries to Lou Wilson (3), Jack Pai, Jim Rukutai, P. Tutaki, and M. Paul (2), with Lou Wilson converting 2, and Moyle and M. Paul 1 each. Māngere had been strengthened by the inclusion of Moyle while Newton had recently lost the services of Lou Brown but still included New Zealand internationals Clarrie Polson and Wally Somers.

Their second win of the season came in round 8 when they beat Ellerslie United 18-10 at Manukau. The league had originally intended to have the 3 lowest ranked teams after the first round drop out of the competition, which was Māngere, Ellerslie, and Newton. However the situation was complicated when the City side defaulted matches in protest of the decision to penalise them for playing Lou Brown when he was not registered with them. One of these default losses handed Māngere their third win. With City effectively removing themselves from the competition the league kept all sides in the competition into the second round.

In July the Māngere club was involved in a controversy with the Manukau Rovers club. It resulted in the entire Manukau club switching to rugby union in protest at their treatment by the Auckland Rugby League. One of their players, M. King, had played for Māngere with them allegedly knowing but not reporting it to the league. The club was censured by the league and quit, citing unfair treatment. Their other wins were over Ellerslie, 19-8 at the Ellerslie Reserve in round 10 and against Athletic 20-19 in round 16. This was their best win of the season with Athletic finishing 4th, and came after Paul "scored a sensational try" on full time to win the match. This appears to be their final match in the championship with their round 17 match with Ponsonby cancelled due to both sides having players involved in the Auckland representative match in Hamilton. Māngere finished with a 5 win, 9 loss recorded, scoring 154 and conceding 252 to finish in 6th position out of 9 teams. Their season came to an official end when they fielded 12 players and lost to Ponsonby 24-5 in the Roope Rooster knockout competition. Ultimately this was to be their only ever appearance in the Roope Rooster competition.

In mid June M. Paul was selected on the wing in an Auckland trial match and scored a try for his Probables side, while Jack Wilson jun., and Tutaki had been selected in the reserves but did not play. Paul was named as emergency back for Auckland B's match with Hamilton on July 16 but did not play. Jack Wilson jun., was chosen as five eighth for Auckland B against Lower Waikato on August 24 in a 15-14 win. Then in late August Hapi was chosen in the second row for Auckland Juniors to play Hamilton, with Paul a reserve in the backs. Auckland won 14-8. M. Paul was also selected as an emergency for the full Auckland side to play South Auckland. While Hapi was chosen in the Auckland Junior side to play Hamilton on October 3 in the second five eighth position.

=== 1925-1930 B Division ===
==== 1925 ====
The 1925 season saw 11 teams nominate themselves for the 1st grade, however the league was concerned with a 1st grade competition with so many teams and as a result they elected to have a 6 team A grade competition and a 5 team B grade competition generally named the B Division. Māngere found themselves placed in this grade along with Ellerslie United, Ōtāhuhu Rovers, Kingsland Rovers, and Northcote & Birkenhead Ramblers. Māngere struggled somewhat and finished in 4th place with a 3 win, 1 draw, 6 loss record. They held their annual meeting at St James Parish Hall at Māngere Bridge. St James Parish Hall is located on Church Road and still stands today. The secretary was player Harold E. Grubb. In May their annual ball was suspended a week, until Thursday, May 21 following the death of the New Zealand Prime Minister. On April 6 at the Onehunga Borough Council meeting the Māngere club asked for a ground at the Onehunga Reserve. However the board said that 1 ground was being allotted to the Association Football club and 3 to the Manukau Rovers rugby club. They said they would investigate further and see if another ground could be formed on the reserve and they also suggested that they apply for a ground at the Ōtāhuhu Trotting Ground.

They also fielded sides in the second, third, and fourth grades but had few results reported and appear to have finished in the bottom half of each grade. The second grade side for their May 2 game was listed: Harold Grubb, W. Dunn, P. Archer, E. Stacy, H. Cunningham, C. Rewha, Hami Hapi, T. Cox, H. Pukeroa, J. McGowan, W. Edwards, W. Souter, Alfred Sneyd, H. Roberts, A. Paul, P. Huia, A. Clark. On May 9 their B Division side played against Kingsland on a farm ground in Māngere named Peter Moko Farm, though the farm was owned by Mr. Bright and was named after Peter Moko, a trotting horse living on the farm. It was located on Westney Road, Māngere. Their senior side for the year were 3 sets of brothers; Lou Wilson and Jack Wilson jun., Wirenui Hapi and J. Hapi, Oscar and Jock Lipscombe, Jack and Tommy Pai, Arthur Roy Ansell, M. Paul, P. Daniels, E. George, B. Rau, Tataki, N. Cunningham, Baker, Roberts, Rongonui, and B. Happy.

==== 1926 ====
The 1926 season saw their annual meeting once again held at St James Parish Hall on Church Road in Māngere Bridge on March 10. Their honorary secretary was Harold Grubb. Another meeting was held in Onehunga on March 24 in Cook's Hall, however at the annual meeting W.F. Faulkner had been elected honorary secretary. They elected Young as their delegate to the Auckland Rugby League at this meeting.

The senior side in the B Division finished 4th of 6 sides with a 7 win, 1 draw, 6 loss record. Their second and third grade sides struggled and had very few of their results reported. Jack Wilson junior who was the Māngere captain was selected in the reserves for what was effectively a New Zealand trial on July 3. Wilson was then selected in another trial match at Carlaw Park, scoring 2 tries in a 30-28 loss for his A Team side. He was later chosen as an emergency player for the Auckland side to play the New Zealand side before their departure for England. Wilson again made a representative side to conclude the season when he was picked in the B Division representative side to play and Auckland Colts team. He played on the wing, with Hapi at five eighth. The Auckland Star said "Wilson, jun. … is a native player of good physique, who plays for the Māngere Club, who may possibly be found in the ranks of one of the metropolitan teams next season".

In late September it was reported that the Māngere Domain Board had invited tenders to develop a football ground at the domain.

==== 1927 ====
In 1927 the B Division had less coverage in the newspapers and Māngere had 3 results not reported at all and others with no score given. However they finished in the lower half of the table with 3 wins and 7 losses reported. H. Lipscombe was elected as the Māngere delegate to the Auckland Management Committee. In early April the applied for a ground to the Onehunga Borough Council but were decline again as all of the fields had been allocated. The club nominated 3 teams again, their senior side, a 2nd grade team and a 3rd grade open team. The 2nd and 3rd grade sides also struggled finishing towards the bottom of the standings. Their first grade side was N. Lipscombe, M. Paul, Joe Wilson, Lou Wilson, Jack Wilson jun., A. Sueyd, J. Hapi, P. Putaki, W. Dunn, Harold Grubb, Jack Pai, Daniels, W. Roberts, Hama Hapi, Arthur (Roy) Ansell, B. Rau, Oscar Lipscombe, A. Forrest, D. Fergusson, and T. Rosier. Their second grade side featured Jack Wilson senior at fullback, along with D. Jones, A. Juilert, D. Young, Clarke, Nathan, Heka, Rau, Herekotukutuku (2), Barton, A. Body, R. Elkington, W. Souter, P. Archer, D. Hira, C. Rewha, D. Filmer, W. Phillips, W. Rongonui, G. Linkhorn, Craike, Roberts, Cartmann, Keating, P. Huia, C. Mahu, Harlick, and Rose. While the 3rd grade open side listed for a June 25 match was D. Hannant, C. Duffy, E. Stacy, J. Glasgow, Bartlett, Le Long, Pert, B. Somerville, G. Linkhorn, Hudson, C. Lockwood, W. Briggs, A. Body, H. Eustace, Bouzaid (2), and E. McKenzie.

Following a 26-7 loss to Ellerslie at the Ellerslie Reserve on May 21 the Auckland Star wrote that "the Māngere team is composed mostly of Maoris [sic] and they threw themselves into the game with wild abandon. The backs were always dangerous, and it was only lack of cohesion that saved Ellerslie's line several times. J. Wilson senr., gave a splendid display at fullback and was a tower of strength to his side. Rosier and J. Wilson were two other backs who showed good form. Forrest and Hama Hapi seemed to be the mainstays of the Mangere pack". The Ellerslie side included the former New Zealand international Ivan Littlewood. On June 25 the Māngere side beat Northcote by default after the Northcote team refused to play on the Māngere ground. A newspaper article in the Sun (Auckland) said that a "report stated the Northcote team had declined to play on the Mangere ground, as it considered the area unfit owing to its sodden and muddy state. The referee considered the match should be awarded to Mangere". A letter from the Northcote club "stated its players were compelled to undress in gorse bushes. This statement was strongly denied by Mr. E. Lipscombe, who said a large dressing shed was at the disposal of visiting teams". The league ultimately decided to award the match to Māngere. Lou Wilson dislocated his arm while playing for their senior side on August 6 against Ōtāhuhu after falling on it.

Jack Wilson jun., was selected for the Auckland side in 6 games for Auckland. He scored 5 tries and kicked 1 conversion for them. In their 63-30 win over Buller it was reported that "Wilson, the Māngere player, took advantage of genial conditions to give a brilliant attacking exhibition of wing three-quarter play, and at times reached quite dazzling heights". In mid July Craike, J. Boddy, and Kearey played in a trial for the Auckland junior side. J. Boddy and Craike were then chosen for the 15 man junior squad to travel to Rotorua to play a match on September 3 but ultimately only Craike was included in the match day side. Craike again made the Auckland Junior side for a match against Franklin Juniors on October 15 at Carlaw Park.

==== 1928 ====
The 1928 saw Māngere once again struggle to compete. Their B Division team won 5 of the 12 games with 1 draw, finishing mid table. While their 2nd grade team withdrew after 6 rounds and their 3rd grade open team withdrew at the beginning of the season. It was reported in early February that good progress was being made with the improvement of the playing area at Māngere Domain with contractors levelling the sports ground, covering the surface "with four inches of sieved volcanic soil" and it was expected they would be open for play towards the end of the coming football season with it being "among the best playing surfaces in Auckland". The ground is still used today with the Onehunga Mangere United Association Football Club located there. Harold Grubb was Māngere's representative on the Auckland Management Committee once more. On June 5 the Māngere club had complained to the Onehunga Borough Council that on May 26 "five outside teams played on the reserve,… necessitating local teams going away. Mr. F. S. Morton said he thought the council should provide for all three codes, and on his motion the application for increased accommodation was referred to the reserves committee".

The Mangere club was going through a relatively settled phase in terms of its playing personnel with many players turning out for their senior side and 2nd grade side once more, though their 3rd grade side obviously failed to take the field when the season opened. Early in the season the Auckland Star speculated that the "Māori team will be hard to beat as the season advances". On June 23 Māngere easily beat Parnell 32-18 at the Māngere (Ōtāhuhu) Trotting Ground. The Auckland Star said "speedy backs and clever back play were features in Māngere's win over Parnell, who played much below the form shown in the earlier games. From the outset Māngere never gave their opponents a chance, and some of their attacks were bewildering to follow. From all manner of positions the Maoris [sic] attacked, and rarely was the ball kicked after they had gained possession. This was the keynote of their success. The forwards supported the backs in the loose, and the vanguard did some good work in following up. [Jack] Wilson played a brilliant game for Māngere, proving very elusive. [M.] Paul, too, made many clever openings, and exploited the dummy pass with success. Hopi was good on attack. Pai was the pick of the forwards, all of whom played good game". The Auckland Rugby League had appointed Jim Clark as the B Division selector to look for possible Auckland representative players and Jack Wilson and M. Paul were identified as potential players from the Māngere side along with future New Zealand internationals Claude List (Kingsland), and Norm Campbell (Otahuhu). In a match at Carlaw Park on July 4 P. Daniels fractured his left ankle in their 3-3 draw with Grafton. In the same game the Sun (Auckland) wrote a flattering piece in the Māngere side saying "a sound reminder of what New Zealand football owes to its many versatile Māori players was provided by the Māngere League team at Carlaw Park on Saturday. Certainly, there did not appear to be a Nēpia or Mill in the side (players of their scintillating brilliance come only once or twice in a period of years) but these cheery native players from the Manukau furnished an object lesson in the art of handling the ball with an ease and accuracy under adverse conditions which was a striking feature of their game against the unbeaten Athletic XIII". Their try came after Roberts "cut loose in an astonishing burst of speed, combined with straight running and a soundly delivered transfer at the correct fraction of a second, which enabled [Jack] Wilson, the star of the side, to out-speed the opposition, and score as nice a try as one could wish to see".

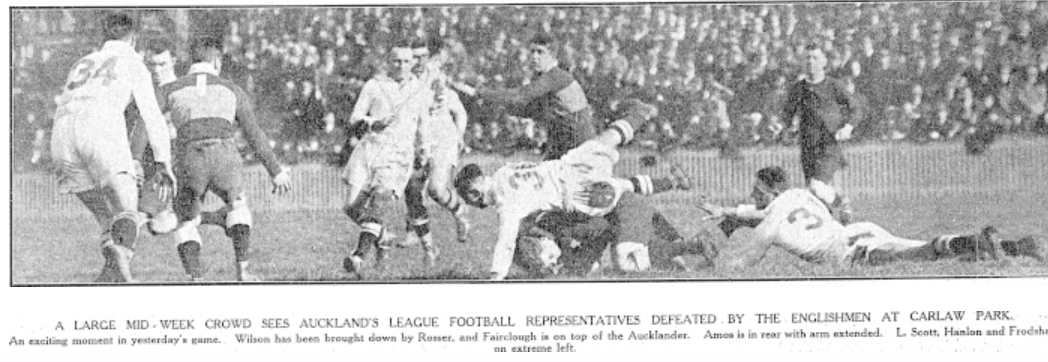
Jack Wilson being tackled by Rosser and Fairclough of the England side

Jack Wilson was named in the Auckland Trial match in the Probables side on the wing. The Possibles won the match 24-14 on July 11. It was speculated in the Auckland Star in early August that Wilson must have gone very close to New Zealand selection for the first test against the touring England side. However the selectors had preferred Len Scott and Roy Hardgrave. Jack Wilson was selected for the Auckland Provincial team to play the touring England team. He was initially chosen as an emergency player but came on to replace Beattie who was injured during the match. He received few chances while on the field.

On Saturday, July 7 tragedy struck the Māngere club when their senior player Wirenui Hapi died after a short illness. Māngere had had a bye on the day of his death and they wore white armbands to remember him for their drawn match with Grafton at Carlaw Park. The Auckland Star wrote "mention must be made of the sad death, after a short illness, of Wirenui Hapi, the popular Māngere half-back, who died early in the week. Hapi had been prominently associated with the Māngere Club, and as a junior represented Auckland. Until a week of his death, Hapi showed good form for Māngere".

==== 1929 ====
The Māngere club had a particularly poor season in 1929. They only fielded one team (after their second grade side withdrew in the early weeks), which was their senior side in the B Division once more and they finished last, winning just 1 match of the 10 they played. In the Stallard Cup they won 2 games of 5 but one of those was by a default. Their team list for the round 4 match showed that there were several new players in the side which was: Slavin, Hannant, Rewha, Daniel, Rau (2), Somerville, Wilson (2), Stacey, Bartlett, Jerry, Roberts (3), Ellis, and Pai. There was however a Māngere Primary School side which also entered a team in the relatively new primary schools competition. They won 4 matches, drew 2 and lost 6, finishing approximately 8th of 11. Their annual meeting was held at Cook's Hall in Onehunga on Tuesday, April 9. Harold Grubb was their honorary secretary once more. J. Miller was their representative on the Auckland management committee. The Māngere club notified the league that they had secured a new football ground in the district and the league decided to play their match with Ōtāhuhu Rovers there in the first round.

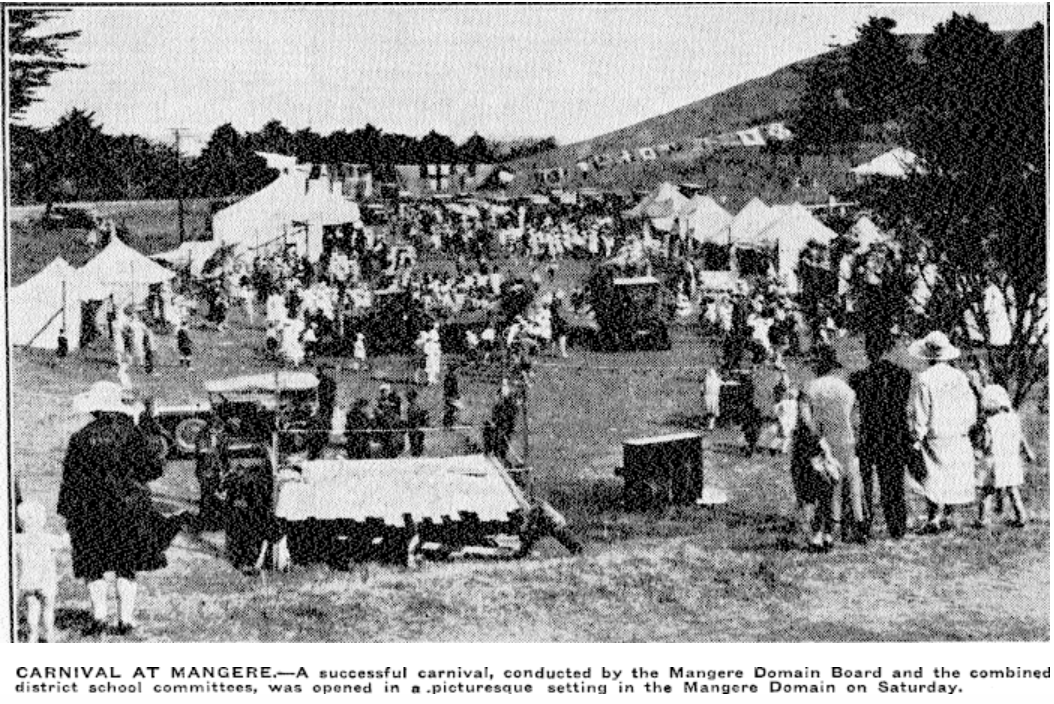
Māngere Domain in 1930.

The ground mentioned was the Māngere Domain which had seen the work on its sports field completed.

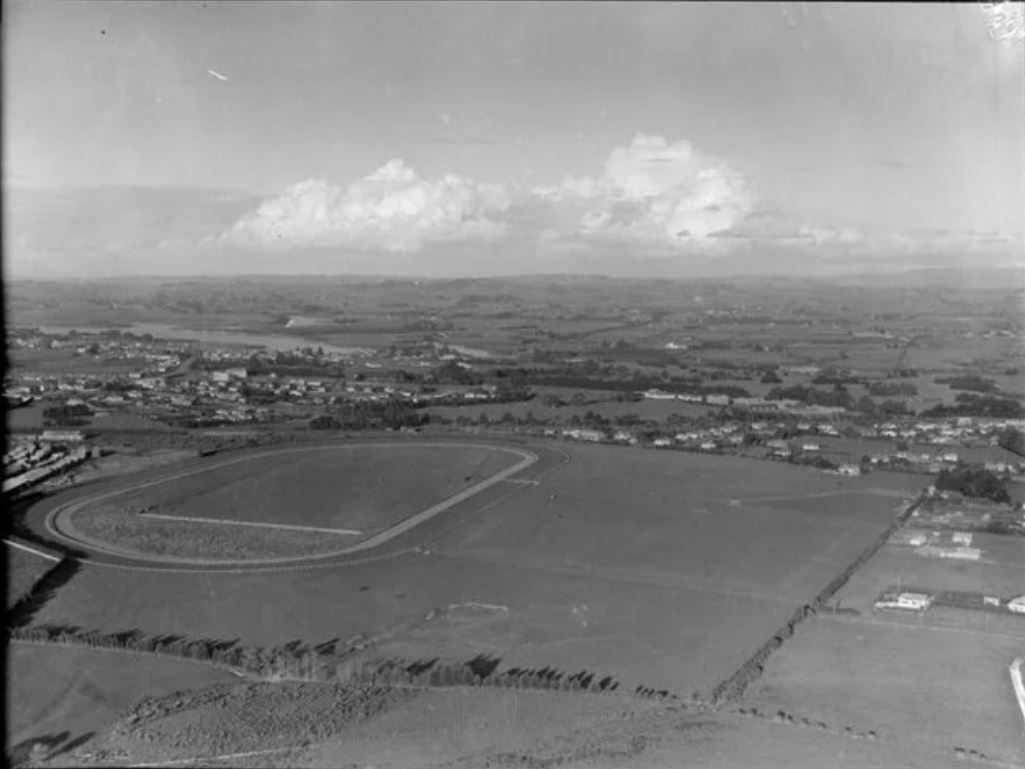
Papatoetoe/Otahuhu Trotting Ground in 1931 which also had fields for rugby union and rugby league and was used during this time by the Auckland RL with Māngere playing there at times.

In mid May the Ōtāhuhu Trotting Club also offered the use of 2 of their fields for rugby league use during the season.

Māngere Domain in 2026.

Unfortunately for the home side they had difficulty getting a side together and started the match with 10 men. They had managed to get to a full 13 before half time but ended up being thrashed 48-0. It was mentioned that "both players and officials speak highly of the playing area" and that "the ground is within easy walk of the Onehunga tram terminus". A reason for Māngere struggling to raise a team was that "the Maoris [sic] have been otherwise engaged during the past weeks". They lost heavily a week later to Parnell 29 to 6. They reportedly had a "fairly strong side"… "but lack of training, so essential to win matches, was noticeable". For Māngere Jack Wilson was again playing and "scored a brilliant try, beating half the opposition in a great run". Following the collapse of their second grade side several of their players were promoted to the senior side. R. Roberts was said to have played brilliantly in their round 4 loss to Point Chevalier, 14-6 at Walker Park in Point Chevalier. Roberts "scored two tries in eight minutes, and on each occasion he beat the defence badly".

In August Joe Wilson (Te Hiko Joseph Wirihana Takaanini Wilson) married Nellie Moore (Hiko Hiko Kawiti) in a large ceremony at Pukaki Pa in Māngere. There were "about sixteen motor car loads of Auckland Rugby League football officials and members of the Northland executive, and players" attended. Wilson was a "direct descendant of high chiefs of the Te Ākitai Waiohua tribe". It was then reported around the same time that the three Wilson brothers, Jack, Joe, and Lou had "decided to throw in their lot with" the Kingsland Athletic club for the close of the 1929 season in the Roope Rooster competition.

==== 1930 ====
The 1930 season saw a slightly improved showing from the Māngere senior side. They won 4 of their 10 matches to finish around 4th of 7 sides. They also fielded a side in the second grade.

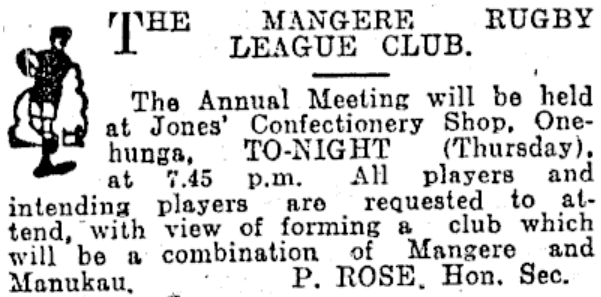

Their annual meeting was at Jones' Confectionary Shop, Onehunga on Thursday, March 20. Their honorary secretary was P. Rose. For the first time in their history to this point details of their annual meeting were published. They had 80 members enrolled for the season. The officers were:-

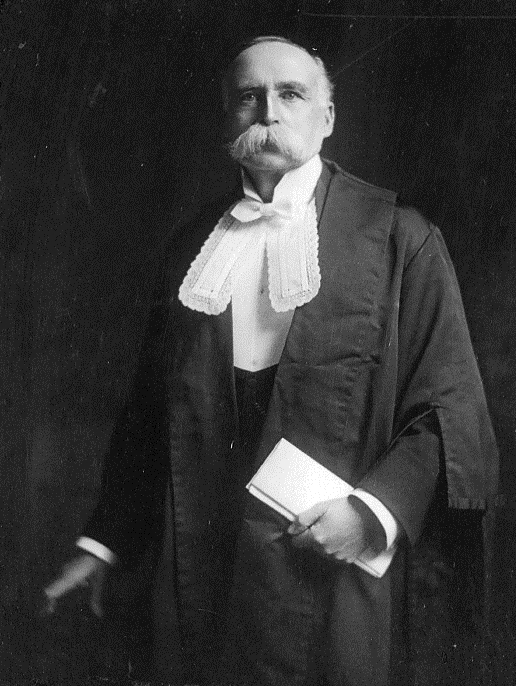
Sir Frederic Lang, club Patron in 1930 (speaker of the House of Representatives from 1913 to 1922).

Patron, Sir Frederic Lang; president, Mr. Samuel Ward House; senior vice-president, Mr. Stan Rickards; vice-presidents, Mrs. Moon, Messrs. H. McGann, McQuilton, W. Kemp, W. McKenrick, W. Evans, W. Paul, A. Kemp; treasurer, Mr. P. Young, senior: secretary, Mr. Burns Young; committee, Messrs. Phardver, M. Paul, J. Slavin, Jack Pai, B. Rau, Jack Wilson sen., Jack Wilson jun., Hapi; senior delegate to Auckland, Mr. H. Miller; junior delegate, Mr. Thomas (Hauwhenua) Kirkwood; club captain, Mr. R. Graham; coach Mr. Jim Rukutai, if available; selection committee, Messrs. P. Young, R. Graham and the coach. They were said to be entering a senior side, a 2nd grade team, and a school boy side. It was the first time that Jim Rukutai had been mentioned in connection with the club for several years. The move of the Wilson brothers to Kingsland had been short lived, with all three moving back to Māngere for the start of the season.

They lost their opening round game to Ōtāhuhu 11-5 on the Māngere Domain. The Auckland Star said that "the Maoris [sic] badly lacked condition, particularly the three-quarters, who had numerous opportunities". They beat Richmond Rovers B in their next match 11-3 also at Māngere Domain. The "Wilson brothers… proved brilliant on attack, and repeatedly placed Māngere in good positions. Jack Wilson was particularly good, and easily the best back". The Richmond side featured future New Zealand forward, Ray Lawless. Their listed side for the match was "Wilson (3), Young (2), Paul (2), Rewha, Roberts, Rau, Daniels, Somerville, Matene, and Slavin". While their second grade side for the same round was Rewha, Waipouri, Hapi, Stanfield, Edward Graham, Pai, Ratu, Boddy, Hoggit, Lockwood, Roberts (2), Huia (2), Here, Wehi. In late May the club requested a match be played at Māngere Domain "in the near future" so that a collection could be taken up with the proceeds "to be devoted to the destitute family of a player of the Māngere club who fractured his thigh in a recent match and was in Auckland Public Hospital. The committee decided to accede to the request and play a match there on June 21". The player concerned was 19 year old Edward Graham, a player in their second grade side. He had spent a long time in hospital due to the injury. The senior first grade match between Ponsonby and Kingsland Rovers was played there as was Ōtāhuhu – Parnell B Division match as curtain raiser, with the Māngere v Richmond game postponed. Ponsonby won the match 13-12 which was the first, and possibly last time a first grade rugby league match was ever played on Māngere Domain. The sum of 9 pounds was eventually raised and given to his mother who thanked the league the following year.

When the 18 player Auckland Junior representative squad was named to play the South Auckland team on May 31, J Hapi and Clarke from Māngere were included. In September a Senior B representative side was chosen to play a benefit match at Sturges Park in Otahuhu to raise money for Mr. W. McManus. Lou Wilson of the Māngere side was selected to play amongst the backs along with Roberts in the forwards. Then in mid October the Māngere side played an Auckland Junior representative team at Onehunga Reserve (Waikaraka Park) in an exhibition match.

=== 1931 Forced amalgamation with Ellerslie and Ōtāhuhu ===
Towards the end of the 1930 season the Auckland Rugby League decided to make some significant changes to the structure of the senior grade competitions. On November 12, at an Auckland Rugby League meeting they "unanimously agreed to entire amalgamation, and to include the Māngere Club, under the style of "Ellerslie-Otahuhu United"". They had also decided to amalgamate the Richmond Rovers and Kingsland clubs in a 'Western Suburbs' club. A suggested name for the Māngere-Ellerslie-Ōtāthuhu side was "Eastern Suburbs", though the name "Southern Suburbs" had also been suggested. Ellerslie gave their support but had reservations due to "the possible difficultly of senior training in a scattered district". One of the motivating factors for the league was in stopping good players from being satisfied with playing senior football in the B Division and ostensibly forcing them into playing for a senior side in the first grade 'A' competition. All sides would also have to field reserve grade sides with the B Division ceasing to exist. No doubt Māngere was an example of this with some of its players being deemed good enough for Auckland selection but remaining in the Māngere side in a lower grade. As well as the Māngere club it was also suggested that the Papatoetoe and Papakura clubs also be included in the 'Southern Districts Club'.

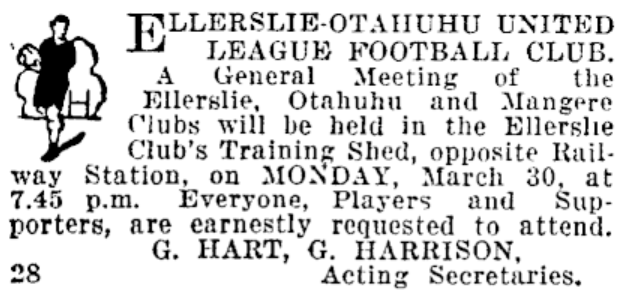
Notice of meeting with Ellerslie, Otahuhu & Māngere.

In mid January of 1931 it was reported that improvement work had been getting done to the Māngere Domain and recreation ground with 50 unemployed men being used while half that number would be used to complete the works over the coming weeks. On March 30 the Ellerslie, Ōtāhuhu and Māngere clubs held a general meeting at the Ellerslie clubs training shed opposite the Ellerslie railway station. With the reduction in senior grade teams and the introduction of the reserve grade the Māngere senior B team was regraded to the 2nd grade which was essentially a demotion as it was the 3rd tier of senior rugby league in Auckland whereas the B Division they had previously been playing was in the 2nd tier. Their players were eligible to be selected for the senior or senior reserve grade sides of the amalgamated club but with travel by train and a general reluctance to be part of the amalgamated side the majority of their players stayed with the Māngere club. At the May 13 meeting of the league Mr. Samuel Ward House, P. Young, and Thomas (Hauwhenua) Kirkwood of the Māngere club "waited upon the league as a deputation, asking that Māngere be a separate institution as a junior club. The chairman asked that the Māngere teams play under the amalgamated title next Saturday while the league was considering the application". The speakers said that "the Maoris [sic] were keen to play league football, but wished to retain their own identity" and it was also decided to arrange a conference with the Ellerslie club. At the May 27 meeting of the league a long discussion took place over the amalgamation. Mr. Jim Rukutai said he had attended a conference and the Māngere club was prepared to play, provided it retained separate identity. This was the main argument, and all in the interests of the Māngere club. Mr. E. Adamson, chairman of the junior management committee, said considerable difficulty had already arisen over the position, and Māngere players were apparently members of the Ellerslie club. A protest against the Māngere club playing under its own identity had already been lodged. The chairman, Mr. George Rhodes, said he was disappointed with the attitude the Māngere club had adopted. He saw no reason shy it could not continue to play league as a separate section, but affiliated with Ellerslie". The Ellerslie club had also written to the league stating that "it was agreeable to Māngere playing under its jurisdiction as a second grade team until the end of the season, when the matter would be reviewed". The league then decided to inform the Māngere club that they were affiliated with the Ellerslie-Otahuhu club. At their July 10 meeting the league noted that a special committee had been formed to make "representations" with the Ellerslie-Otahuhu United club with the issue looked at again the following week. Some Māngere players had already played for the combined Ellerslie-Otahuhu side and it was "intended that the club should apply for the resignation of its players" so that they could then re-register with the Māngere club.

Eventually in mid July the Māngere club was released from the amalgamation. Though the Ellerslie-Otahuhu United club asked "for the retention of Māngere players pending a conference in September". The league decided that the "Māngere clubs petition for release be granted, Ellerslie to have the right to veto any Māngere club transfers to other clubs this season".

In their second match of the season against Papakura (the eventual second grade championship winners) the Māngere side had a 14-7 win at Prince Edward Park in Papakura. The likes of D. Young, Jack Wilson jun., Roberts, and M. Paul were playing for the second grade side. In mid August Hika T. Wilson, aged 21 was concussed while playing a game for Māngere and taken to Auckland Hospital. As was common at the time his residence was published, stating that he lived on Pukaki Road in Māngere. It was also added that his condition was not serious. In September a squad was chosen including Lou Wilson and D. Young from Māngere to represent Auckland Juniors. They played the reserve grade champions, Devonport United on September 25, with both Māngere players playing well in a 18-3 win. The Auckland Juniors also the Wednesday afternoon representative side on October 17. The Wednesday Reps beat the Junior Reps 23 to 6 though no side was named for the Juniors so it is unknown if Wilson or Young played.

=== 1932-34 2nd grade champions and demise ===
Now that Māngere had been allowed to go their separate way and return to being a stand alone club they spent their final 3 seasons of their existence in the second grade.

==== 1932 second grade knockout champions ====
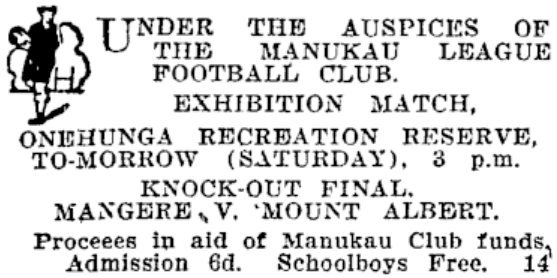
2nd grade knockout final advertisement

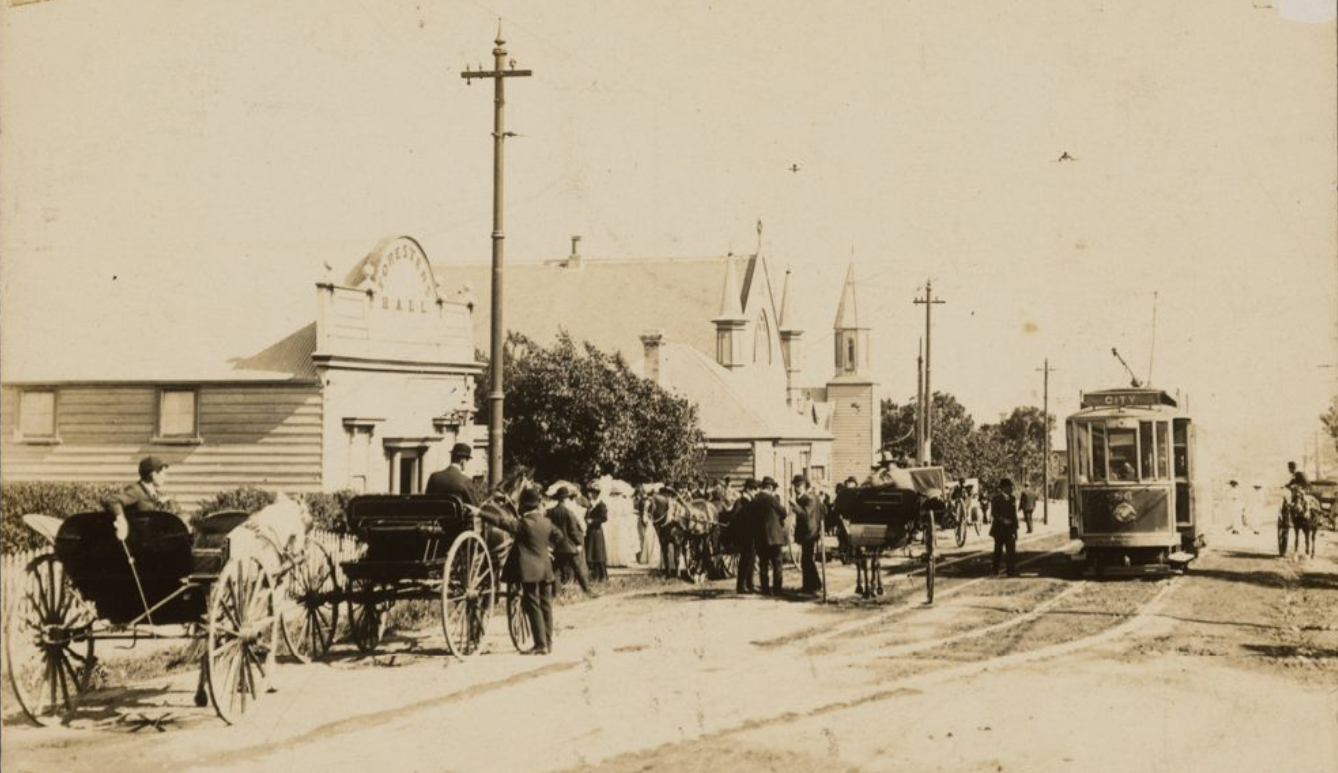
Foresters Hall on the left, Onehunga. Venue of their annual dance.

In 1932 Māngere fielded a side in the second grade, along with teams in the 6th and 7th grades which were for smaller, younger players. Their second grade team for their July 16 match was listed as: Roberts (3), Jack Wilson jun., Lou Wilson, Hika Wilson, M. Paul, C.E. Black, Albert E. Grubb, P. Daniels, Here (2), R. Young, J. McKay, Youlden, B. Rau, J.T. Harvey, H. Kopu, M. Grace, and L. Marshal. After 8 rounds they were in 6th place out of 9, with a 3 win, 1 draw, 4 loss record. In October the 2nd grade knockout competition for the Foster Shield was played at Onehunga between Māngere and Mount Albert. The Manukau club had received authority from the Onehunga Borough Council to make a charge at the recreation reserve (Waikaraka Park) for the match. With an advertisement for the game placed in the Auckland Star. Māngere won the match by 18 to 15 to claim their 3rd Fosters Shield trophy following their previous wins in 1922 and 1923. The Manukau club advised the league afterwards that the staging of the match at Onehunga "had proved of great benefit to the revival of the code in the district".

On November 3 they held their "annual dance and social" at Foresters' Hall in Onehunga. It was going to feature a "Maori Display, Monte Carlo, Spot Waltz and Famous Snappy Six".

==== 1933, 2nd grade champions, and repeat knockout winners ====
They held their seventeenth annual meeting in late March with Mr. Stan Rickards presiding. Their annual report referred to the second grade side which won the knockout competition and finished 4th in the championship. They suggested that prospects for the season ahead were "bright". The following officers were elected:- Patron, Mr. Samuel Ward House; president, Mr. Stan J. Rickards; senior vice-president, Mr. S. J. French; vice presidents, committee, and selectors were re-elected; secretary, Mr. Harold E. Grubb, treasurer, Mr. French; auditor, Mr. C. P. Laeity.

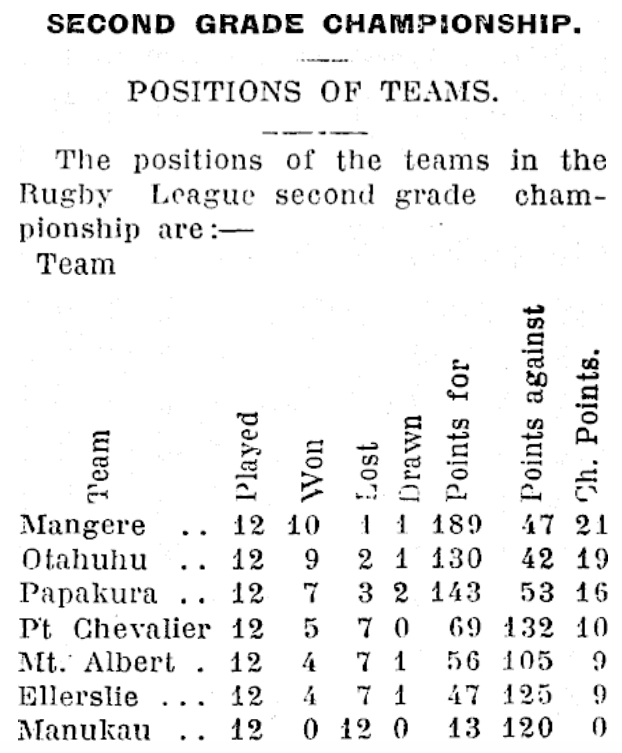

The 1933 season saw Māngere win their first and only grade championship when they won the 2nd grade competition. In late July Māngere hosted Papakura and won 13 to 6. The Franklin Times said in reference to the Māngere side that "on their wonderful display it is doubtful whether there is a team in the competition likely to defeat them. Māngere is still one point behind Otahuhu and it is fairly obvious that the winners this season will be decided when these two teams meet in the second round". Their match description notes said "their forwards were tireless and wonderful on defence while the backs were displaying better combination and more effective penetrating ability". In mid July Wilson was selected at first five eighth in an Auckland trial match for the A Team. On August 12 the championship final was played between Māngere and Ōtāhuhu at Carlaw Park as curtain raiser to the match between Auckland and Northland. Māngere won the match 11 to 8 to claim an historic grade championship for the club after 17 seasons of competition, winning the Wright Cup as 2nd grade champions. The final standings were published in the Franklin Times and showed Māngere with a 10 win, 1 draw, 1 loss record, having scored 189 points and conceded 47 for 21 competition points, 2 ahead of Otahuhu.

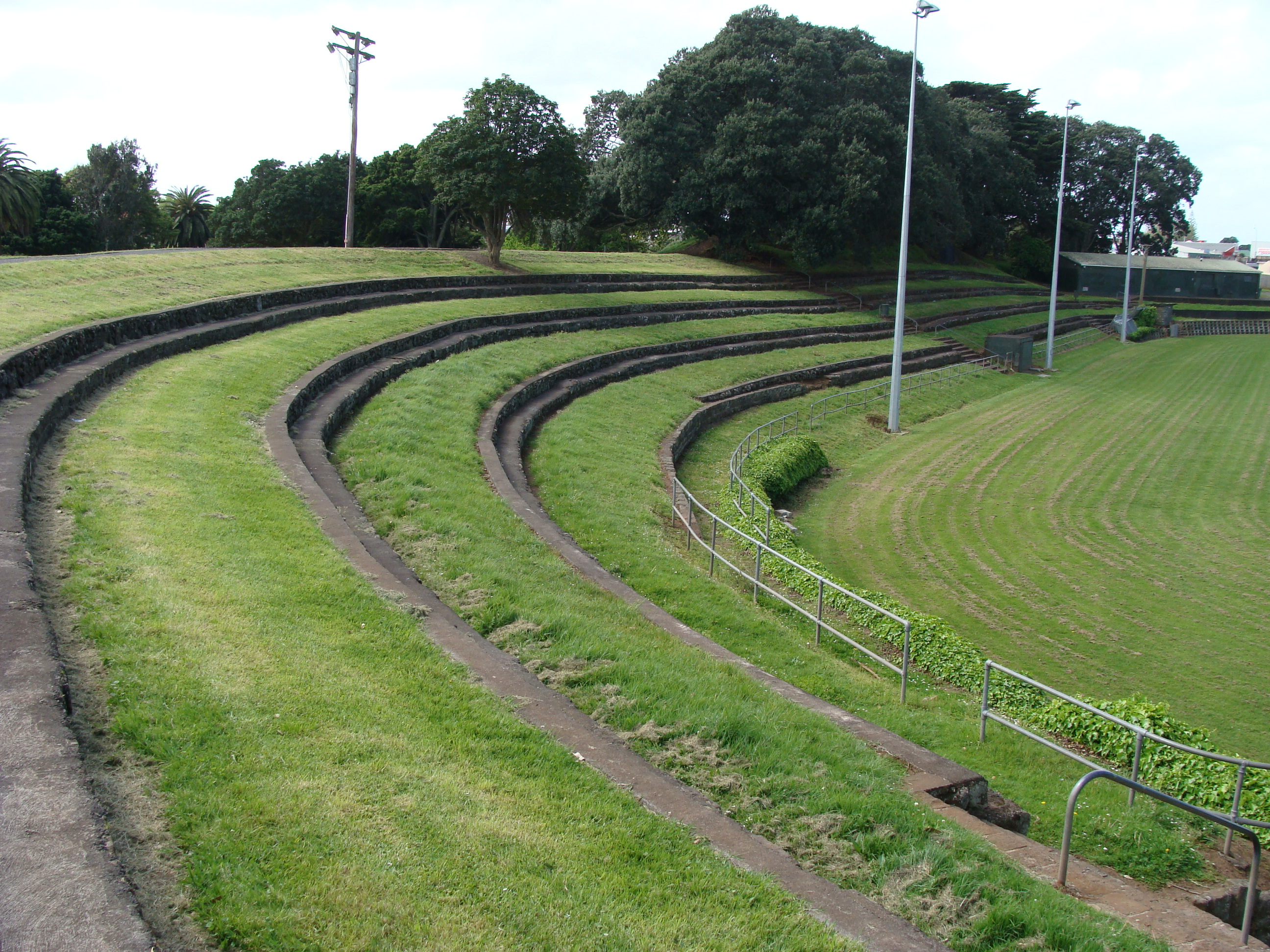
Sturges Park, Otahuhu.

On August 29 the club requested financial assistance from the league to assist toward ground fees, with the application deferred for consideration. On September 2 the final of the knockout competition was played at Sturges Park in Ōtāhuhu between Māngere and Otahuhu once more. Māngere were victorious by 24 points to 8. On October 7 Māngere were scheduled to play the Kia Ora club team who were champions of the Waikato Rugby League. The match was curtain raiser to the Max Jaffe Cup game at Carlaw Park. However the match was ultimately not able to go ahead. At the Auckland Rugby League social evening on October 31 at the Manchester Unity Hall the Māngere club were presented with the Wright Cup and Foster Shield.

==== 1934 final season, matches v Tuakau ====
The 1934 season was to be the Māngere clubs last. In the second grade they played 14 games, winning 6 and losing 8 to finish 4th out of 6 teams. Their 3rd grade side finished towards the bottom of the standings. One possible reason for their demise was the resurgence of the Manukau club in the neighbouring Onehunga area which fielded 4 teams.

The league asked the Māngere side to travel to Tuakau to play the local side on Monday, June 7 which was Kings Birthday. The Auckland Star reported comments made by Mr. Owen Wilkie, and ARL official that "the exhibition match between the Lower Waikato representatives (Tuakau) and Māngere on King's Birthday at Tuakau was a fine contest and the players of the new sub-league were unlucky to be defeated by 12-13. He warmly recommended that the Tuakau district team be early played at Carlaw Park in the return fixture". The match in Tuakau was played before 200 spectators on their recreation ground. The Māngere side for the match was R. Roberts, B. Roberts, Jack Wilson, T. Wehi, T. Rau, R. Johnson, N. Harvey, H. Roberts, W. Roberts, P. Davies, G. Kini, W. Johnson, and B. Nightingale. For Māngere Harvey, R. Johnson, and Grubb scored tries. Grubb had come on to replace one of the Roberts brothers who was injured with Rau converting one try and the remaining Roberts brother the other. After the match the side was entertained at the Tuakau Hotel with comments about the standard of the football played made by Wilkie and Mr. G.N. Asher.

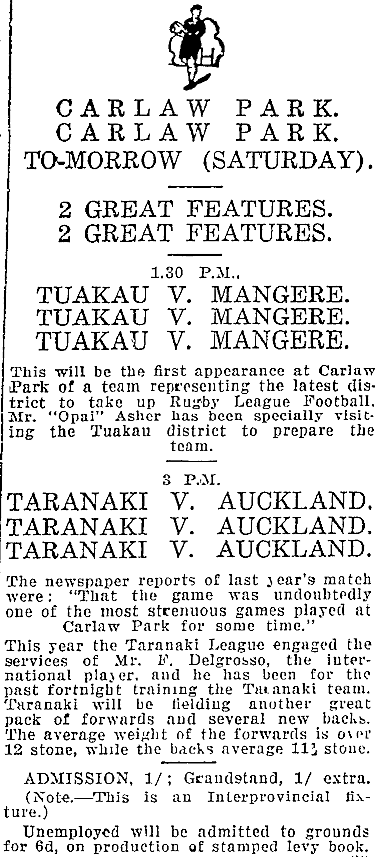

In mid June the league requested that the club "compel spectators to stand back on the bank at games staged there" in reference to the Māngere Domain which had a bank on its northern side line.

Then on June 30 the Tuakau club played Māngere in their return match at Carlaw Park. Albert Asher, former New Zealand rugby league player from 1910 to 1913 and All Black in 1903 had been involved in preparing the Tuakau side. Asher had also represented the New Zealand Māori side from 1908 to 1910. The Māngere side listed to play was similar to the one which had played previously and was: Johnson, Roberts, Wilson, Haslett, Jacobs, Rau, and Harvey in the backs, with H. Roberts, Grubb, W. Roberts, Heri, Paul, Nightingale in the forwards with B. Rau, Rickards, Jones, and Marshall the emergency players. The side which took the field was slightly different with two Wilson's playing, Lou on a wing with Jack Wilson at centre. Tuakau turned the tables and won the match 11-10. After the match the Tuakau side was entertained by Māngere at Onehunga. At the July 4 meeting of the league the Māngere club was thanked for their services in connection with the match.

On July at the league meeting several clubs complained loudly at the league's decision to only play 2 rounds in the second grade. The Māngere club said ‘it took some weeks for a team to settle down. Experience proved that three rounds of play produced the best results". At the same meeting Poutai Rewha transferred back to the Māngere club after having spent time at the Ellerslie club following their failed merger of 1931. On July 17 the Māngere club, represented by Stan Rickards, who had recently succeeded Mr. Harold Grubb as secretary, wrote suggesting a return match with Tuakau. He said that their side was "much strengthened since it met Tuakau at Carlaw Park" and that they have a match either with them, or else Huntly. The league decided that this was a matter for Māngere to arrange.

On August 4 their match with Papakura was played at Massey Park in Waiuku. The game was played there to introduce the game to the area with Māngere winning by 7 points to 6. The match was an upset victory for Māngere and ruined Papakura's chances of winning the championship. With the championship over the knockout competition began and Māngere made the final for the third successive year. This time however they lost, losing to Papakura by 26 points to 3 at Onehunga.

==== Involvement in Māori representative league origins ====
With their season over representatives Jack Wilson and Stan Rickards met at the Strand Theatre in Onehunga amongst other members of the Māori rugby league community to discuss the Waitangi Shield challenge matches. They were principally focussed on the establishment of a Tāmaki (Auckland) Māori rugby league team to challenge for the shield. A committee was set up with Rickards as chairman. This was for all intents and purposes the birth of Māori representative rugby league in Auckland. The first match they played was against Waikato Māori on September 12 at Carlaw Park. Tāmaki Māori won the game by 36 points to 13. The Tāmaki side featured W. Roberts, R. Roberts, T. Rau, and Lou Wilson of the Māngere side. Rau scored a try and one of the Roberts brothers did likewise. On September 22 they travelled to New Plymouth to challenge the Taranaki Māori side for the Waitangi Shield. B Roberts, Lou Wilson, Poutai Rewha, W Roberts, and T Rau were named in the touring side. W. Roberts scored a try in their 32-5 win to claim the shield. Their first defence of the Waitangi Shield came at Huntly on October 6 against Waikato Māori. Once again B. Roberts and W. Roberts were selected from the Māngere team. The match was drawn 5-5 and was part of the celebrations for the first anniversary of the crowning of the Māori King Koroki Mahuta. They played one further match to finish the season against the Auckland Colts at Carlaw Park on October 20. The colts side won 29 to 12, with the Tāmaki Māori team including B. Roberts and T. Rau from Māngere with Rewha, W. Roberts, and Lou Wilson in the reserves.

==== 1935 Disappearance ====
There was no indication that the Māngere club was going to cease to exist. On August 6 it was reported that the Māngere senior B players were regraded to second grade though they had neither a senior B team nor a second grade team in 1935. Then on August 20 Bulli Heri and Allan Paul were registered with the Māngere club. Following this there was no further mention of the Māngere club again. Decades later the Manukau Rovers club relocated from the Onehunga area to Moyle Park in the Māngere West area, while in 1963 the Māngere East club was formed to represent the eastern side of the Māngere suburb and is located at Walter Massey Park.

== Player records ==
=== Mangere Senior Team 1924 ===
Player	Years	Games	Tries	Goals	Points
M Paul	1924	12	9	3	33
Lou Wilson	1924	12	7	4	29
Jim Rukutai	1924	9	5	0	15
Jack Pai	1924	11	3	1	11
P Tutaki	1924	11	2	0	6
Norman Lipscombe	1924	12	1	1	5
Tommy Pai	1924	9	1	1	5
Arthur Ansell	1924	12	1	1	5
Daniels	1924	2	1	0	3
Rau	1924	1	1	0	3
L Moyle	1924	1	0	1	2
Poutai	1924	1	0	0	0
Digger	1924	4	0	0	0
W Hapi	1924	10	0	0	0
Peter	1924	5	0	0	0
Harold Lipscombe	1924	10	0	0	0
W Roberts	1924	3	0	0	0
Rewha	1924	1	0	0	0
Paul	1924	1	0	0	0
Roberts	1924	1	0	0	0
W Lipscombe	1924	3	0	0	0
Hapi	1924	2	0	0	0
W Edwards	1924	3	0	0	0
N Wilson	1924	6	0	0	0
Adam Housham	1924	5	0	0	0
Hui	1924	3	0	0	0
Richards	1924	1	0	0	0
O Lipscombe	1924	1	0	0	0
Marshall	1924	1	0	0	0

=== Representative players ===
==== Auckland ====
Player	Years	Games	Tries	Goals	Points
Lipscombe	1924	1	0	0	0
Jack Pai	1924	1	0	0	0
Tommy Pai	1924	1	0	0	0
Jack Wilson jun.	1927-28	7	5	1	34

==== Tāmaki Māori (Auckland Māori) ====
Player	Years	Games	Tries	Goals	Points
W. Roberts	1934	3	2	0	6
R. Roberts	1934	3	1	0	3
T. Rau	1934	2	1	0	3
G. Heri	1934	2	0	0	0
Lou Wilson	1934	1	0	0	0

==== Auckland B ====
Player	Years	Games	Tries	Goals	Points
Jack Wilson jun.	1924	1	0	0	0
M Paul	1924	1	1	0	3

==== Auckland B Division Representatives ====
Player	Years	Games	Tries	Goals	Points
Jack Wilson jun.	1926	1	0	0	0
Hapi	1926	1	0	0	0

==== Auckland Trial ====
Player	Years	Games	Tries	Goals	Points
M Paul	1924	1	1	0	3

==== Auckland Juniors (2nd grade) ====
Player	Years	Games	Tries	Goals	Points
J. Wilson	1919	1	-	-	-
Jack Pai	1922	1	0	0	0
Tommy Pai	1923	1	-	-	-
Arthur Roy Ansell	1923	1	-	-	-
B. Potai	1923	1	-	-	-
W. Harper	1923	1	-	-	-
Wirenui Hapi	1924	2	-	-	-
Clarke	1930	1	-	-	-
Hapi	1930	1	-	-	-
Lou Wilson	1931	2	-	-	-
D. Young	1931	2	-	-	-

== Team records ==
=== Most senior team ===
The season record for the most senior men's team in the club.

Year	Grade	Club Name	Pld	W	D	L	PF	PA	PD	Pts	Position (Teams)
1915	2nd Grade	Māngere Rangers	8	3	0	5	66	46	+20	6	4th of 10
1916	2nd Grade	Māngere Rangers	0	0	0	0	0	0	0	0	Last (withdrew after 2 rounds)
1917	No Teams										
1918	2nd Grade	Māngere Rangers	2	0	0	2	0	14	-14	0	Unknown, almost no results reported
1919	2nd Grade	Māngere Rangers	5	1	0	4	34	57	-23	2	Approximately 6th of 10
1920	2nd Grade	Māngere Rangers	3	1	0	2	9	46	-37	2	Approximately 9th of 10
1921	No Teams										
1922	2nd Grade	Māngere Rangers	8	3	1	4	38	68	-30	7	4th of 13, won KO final 19-11 v Newton (Foster Shield)
1923	2nd Grade	Māngere Rangers	6	5	1	0	95	39	+56	11	2nd of 12, lost final v City 3-16, won KO final 48-15 v Ōtāhuhu (Foster Shield)
1924	1st Grade	Māngere Rangers	13	4	0	9	135	244	-109	8	6th of 9, L v Ponsonby 24-5 in R1 of the Roope Rooster
1925	B Grade	Māngere United	10	3	1	6	66	96	-30	7	7th of 9
1926	B Grade	Māngere United	14	7	1	6	134	113	+21	15	8th of 11
1927	B Grade	Māngere United	12	2	0	7	63	79	-16	4	5th of 7
1928	B Grade	Māngere United	12	5	1	6	139	89	+50	11	4th of 7
1929	B Grade	Māngere United	10	1	0	9	50	232	-82	2	6th of 6
1930	B Grade	Māngere United	10	4	0	6	90	83	+7	8	4th of 7, Lost to Ōtāhuhu 0-6 in Stallard Cup KO R1
1931	2nd Grade	Māngere United	14	4	0	6	62	28	+34	8	5th of 8
1932	2nd Grade	Māngere United	16	6	1	5	75	70	+5	13	4th of 9, won KO final v Mt Albert 18-15 (Foster Shield)
1933	2nd Grade (Wright Cup)	Māngere United	12	10	1	1	189	47	+142	21	1st of 7, won final 11-8 v Otahuhu, won KO final v Otahuhu 24-8 (Foster Shield)
1934	2nd Grade (Wright Cup)	Māngere United	14	5	2	7	86	84	+2	12	4th of 6, lost knockout final 26-3 v Papakura
1915-34	TOTAL	-	171	67	9	84	1322	1497	-175	143	
