= Robert Evans (referee) =

Robert (Bob) Evans (1939 - 2016) was a Welsh-American soccer player, coach, and referee, author, and research geologist who represented the United States Soccer Federation (now "U.S. Soccer") as an international (FIFA) referee from 1980 to 1988. He also served as U.S. Soccer's National Director of Referee Instruction from 1988 until 1992 and is often credited with being the father of its national referee instruction program.

== Professional career ==
Evans worked in the North American Soccer League (NASL), the country's top professional league at the time, first as a linesman (now termed "assistant referee") and then as a referee from 1971 until the demise of the league in 1985. Evans was also an exceptional linesman, evidenced by the fact he was appointed to serve as linesman for the 1982 NASL final ("Soccer Bowl 82"). He also refereed in the American Soccer League (ASL), a second division professional league at the time, where his friend and referee mentor, Pat Smith was Director of Officials.

== International career ==
In 1979, U.S. Soccer nominated Evans to serve on its FIFA Panel of Referees, which at that time was limited in number to seven. He was the first referee from U.S. Soccer's Region III to receive that honor. During the time he spent on the international panel, Evans refereed fifteen (15) full international A matches over an eight-year stretch that included games throughout the Confederation of North, Central American and Caribbean Association Football (CONCACAF) and trips to Asia for tournaments. He refereed teams from every F.I.F.A. confederation and officiated FIFA World Cup and Olympic qualifying games

== Administration and Instruction ==
In 1974, Eddie Pearson, considered the founder of the U.S. Soccer National Referee Program, Pat Smith, Harry Baldwin, Roger Schott, Don Byron, Evans, and others met in New York to lay the foundations of the U.S. Soccer National Referee Program. Later, Bob would retire from the international panel early so that he could accept the position of National Director of Referee Instruction. From 1988 to 1992, Evans served as National Director of Referee Instruction for U.S. Soccer, during which time he designed the curriculum for the first national assessor's course and created the instructor and assessor grades that are still used by U.S. Soccer today. In 1992, he became the first American to be appointed a FIFA referee instructor.

Evans was recognized as an expert on Law 11 (Offside), producing a comprehensive set of slides on the subject and later narrating a video produced by U.S. Soccer.

== Author ==
Evans authored several books for linesmen (assistant referees), including "Manual for Linesmen" and "Teaching Offside" (with Tony Waiters) and "For the Good of the Game: Modern Techniques and Practical Wisdom for Today's Soccer Referee" (with long-time colleague, retired FIFA referee Edward Bellion, Ph.D.). He was also a frequent contributor to Soccer America and a freelance science journalist with contributions to Smithsonian and American Scientist. Evans was an active blogger on his website, For the Integrity of Soccer.

== Playing ==
Evans grew up playing soccer (football) in the local youth soccer leagues. When he entered the University of Nottingham, he played goalkeeper for the University football club. His academic pursuits would later take him to Canada and then to the United States, where he continued to play amateur football as a goalkeeper.

== Awards ==
Evans was elected to the North Texas Soccer Hall of Fame and received the Eddie Pearson Award from U.S. Soccer in 1992. In 1994, he received the William Scofield Award after recovering from non-Hodgkin's lymphoma and continuing to make significant contributions to the game and U.S. referee program. In 2016, the Region III of the United States Adult Soccer Association created the Robert Evans Lifetime Achievement Award to honor the person making the greatest contribution to soccer refereeing in region III.

== Research Geologist ==
Evans worked as a research geologist for Mobil Oil Company in Dallas from 1969 to 1988. He specialized in the geology of evaporites, a type of rock that forms the seal above many petroleum evaporites, and published many articles and monographs on the subject.

== Personal life ==
The middle child and only boy among three siblings, Evans grew up in Gowerton, near Swansea, the son of Ted Allsopp, an army officer, and Gwladys, a nurse. (When his parents divorced, he and his siblings took their stepfather's surname, Evans.) He attended and earned a degree in geology from Nottingham University, where he was also active in student politics. Subsequently, Evans moved to Canada to study geology at Dalhousie University in Halifax, Nova Scotia. His academic interest then took him to the University of Kansas, where he earned a doctorate of philosophy (Ph.D.), also in geology.

Evans traveled to the bottom of the Pacific Ocean in Alvin, the U.S. navy submarine, climbed volcanoes to investigate their geology, and flew light aircraft.
