= Pat Smith (soccer referee) =

British-American soccer referee

Pat Smith (November 10, 1923 – December 7, 2009) was a British-American soccer referee who was one of the founders of the U.S. Soccer national referee program and served as the first president of the National Intercollegiate Soccer Officials Association.

== Officiating career ==
=== Collegiate. ===
Smith officiated at the collegiate level for 15 years. While there, he officiated hundreds of collegiate games including six NAIA semifinals, numerous NCAA semifinals, and two NCAA men's finals.

=== Professional. ===
When the North American Soccer League was formed in 1967 and Eddie Pearson was brought over from England to train referees, Pat was one of the first people selected to officiate in the league. He refereed the first game in Fenway Park and officiated two "bronze boot" games in St. Louis.

== Referee administration ==
Pat Smith was elected to serve as the first president of the then newly formed Ohio Intercollegiate Soccer Officials Association in 1970. In 1972, he was elected and served as first president of the newly formed National Intercollegiate Soccer Officials Association (NISOA). In 1970, Mr. Smith was appointed Director of Officials for the American Soccer League (ASL), the second division professional soccer in the United States at the time, a position he held until 1978. When Eddie Pearson began building the national referee program for U.S. Soccer, he naturally recruited Smith (and Bob Evans) to assist with its development.

== Coaching ==
Smith helped launch the men's soccer program at the University of Ohio at Dayton in 1958 and served as its first coach.

== Contributions ==
Many of the officials who represented U.S. Soccer as International (FIFA) referees credit Smith with their success. Among these officials are Robert (Bob) Evans (also U.S. Soccer's former National Director of Referee Instruction), Edward Bellion, Alfred Kleinatis (also U.S. Soccer's former Manager of Referee Development), Brian Hall (referee) (CONCACAF Director of Referees), Raul Dominguez, and Zimmerman Boulos.

== Honors and awards ==
Pat Smith was the first recipient of U.S. Soccer's Eddie Pearson award, which he was awarded in 1979 for his contribution to soccer officiating in the United States. In 1998, he was inducted into the National Soccer Hall of Fame.

== United States Adult Soccer Association (U.S.A.S.A.), Region II Pat Smith Award ==
The Region II division of the United Statues Adult Soccer Association, the amateur division of U.S. Soccer serving adult players, established the Pat Smith Award, given annually to an official in region II who has made significant contributions to soccer officiating at the adult level in region II.

== Patrick Smith Memorial Scholarship ==
A soccer scholarship has been established in his honor.
