= Paddy Smith =

Paddy Smith may refer to:

- Patrick Smith (politician) (1901–1982), Irish politician
- Paddy Smith (baseball) (1894–1990), Major League Baseball player

== See also ==
- Patrick Smith (disambiguation)
