= Jim Rukutai =

New Zealand Māori leader and rugby footballer

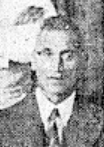

Personal information
- Full name: James Rukutai
- Born: 1877 or 1878 Kāwhia, Waikato, New Zealand
- Died: 11 January 1940 (aged 62) Onehunga, Auckland

Playing information
- Position: Loose forward, Prop, Hooker
Club
Years	Team	Pld	T	G	FG	P
1910–11	City Rovers	9	4	0	0	12
1912–13	Manukau	8	2	0	0	6
1913–19	City Rovers	53	11	7	0	47
1917	Combined (City, Newton, & N Shore)	1	0	0	0	0
1921–22	Fire Brigade	4	0	0	0	0
1924	Māngere United	7	5	0	0	15
	Total	82	22	7	0	80
Representative
Years	Team	Pld	T	G	FG	P
1909	New Zealand Māori	9	3	1	0	11
1911–18	Auckland	18	9	2	0	31
1911–21	New Zealand	23	7	0	0	21

Coaching information
Representative
Years	Team	Gms	W	D	L	W%
1919–20	Māngere United	16	8	2	6	50
1921–22	Fire Brigade	24	3	1	20	13
1921	New Zealand	8	4	0	4	50
1922–37	New Zealand Māori	11	5	0	6	45
1924–30	Māngere United	10	4	0	6	40
1933	Auckland	5	5	0	0	100

James (Jim) Kumiti Rukutai (born 1877 or 1878 – 11 January 1940) was a prominent Māori leader, interpreter as well as a New Zealand rugby union and professional rugby league footballer. He played representative rugby league (RL) and coached New Zealand.

== Early life ==
Rukutai was born at Kāwhia and affiliated to Ngāti Hikairo and also of Pākehā descent. He was educated at St Stephen's School. He started his career playing rugby union and was part of George A. Gillett's Goldfields team that defeated Auckland in 1906. Rukutai was working as a miner in Waihi at the time.

He married Bella Rukutai (née Pera) who was a Maori welfare worker and fellow member of the Te Akarana Māori Association. They had two daughters.

== Rugby league ==
Rukutai in the background of this moment of play for Auckland against Hawke's Bay, August 19, 1911 at Victoria Park.

Rukutai played for the City Rovers in the 1910 and 1911 Auckland Rugby League competition and also toured Australia with the New Zealand Māori team. He first made the New Zealand side in 1911, alongside former Union teammate George Gillett. He only played a handful of matches in his first two season with City Rovers because he was away on tours for Auckland, and New Zealand several times.

Rukutai was the first captain of the Manukau Magpies when they entered the Auckland Rugby League competition in 1912. The Manukau senior team disbanded during the 1913 season and he moved back to the City Rovers club where he played until 1919.

During the 1913 season he was thought to have contracted Smallpox and at the time he was the only known patient. He was living in Onehunga and was placed in the hospital at Point Chevalier in the isolation ward. His house in Onehunge was "thoroughly disinfected". It then turned out that he had actually been suffering from a severe case of chicken pox and he recovered well. This was not the end of his health issues in 1913. He fell from a horse on 16 November 1913 and broke his leg just above the right ankle in Māngere. The horse stumbled and fell on to him.

He toured Australia with New Zealand in 1911 and 1912 and his career continued after the War when he again toured Australia in 1919. However, Rukutai played in no Test matches as during this time New Zealand played matches against New South Wales and Queensland.

In 1923 Rukutai requested to resume his playing career in the Mangere first junior team as a means to "coaching in a practical manner" however in the Auckland Rugby League Management Committee meeting on 13 June his request was denied. However the following year he was part of the Mangere United team which was a team made from the Manukau and Mangere teams which had been competing in the 2nd grade.

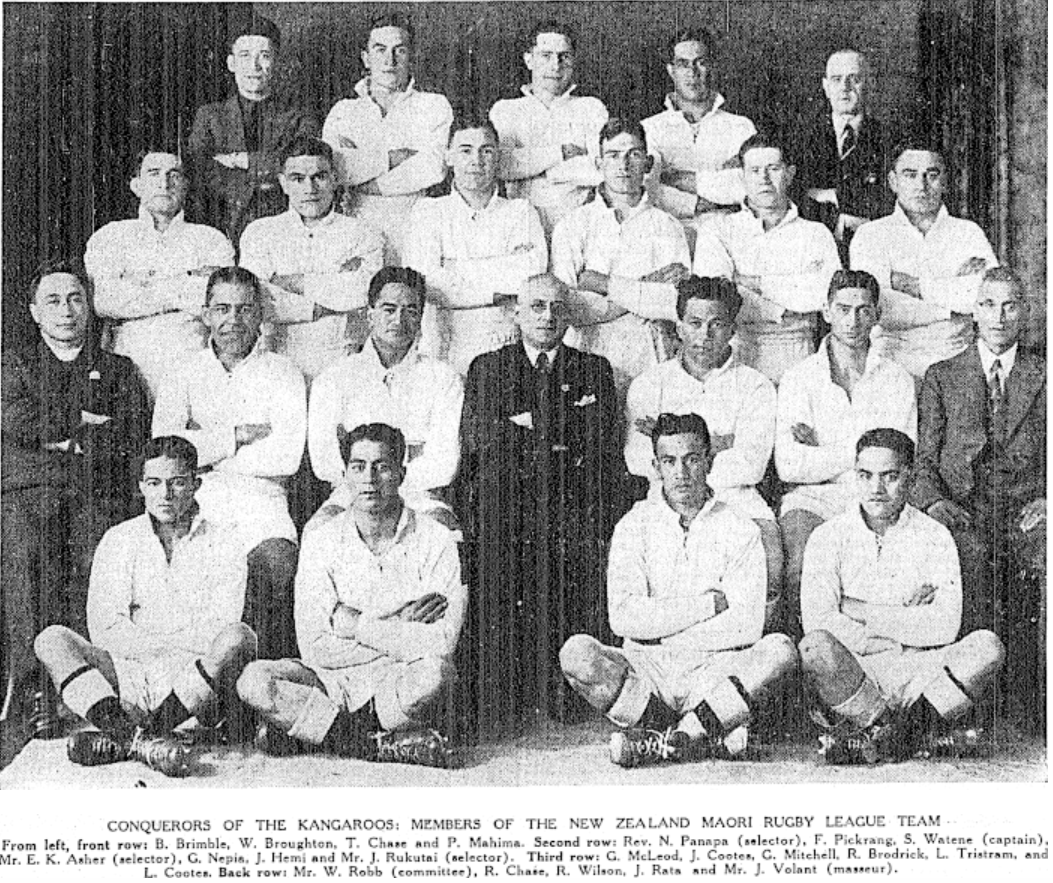
New Zealand Māori squad to play Australia,1937.

In 1932 Rukutai served on the Auckland Rugby League board as the Clubs' delegate. He then served as the first chairman of the New Zealand Māori Rugby League Board when it was formed in 1934.

== Coaching ==
Rukutai coached New Zealand during their 1921 tour of Australia. He remains New Zealand's youngest ever national coach.

He also coached New Zealand Māori between 1922 and 1937. On 11 August 1937, he coached the New Zealand Māori to an upset 16–5 win over Australia at Carlaw Park.

== Māori advocacy ==
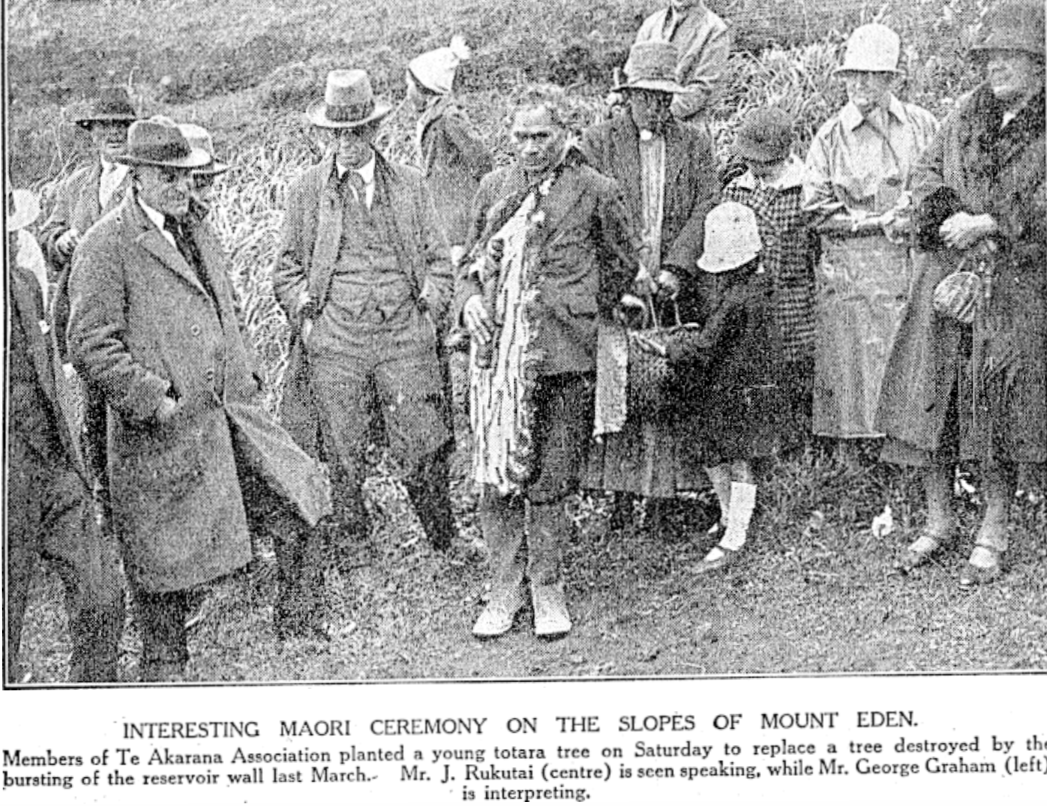
Rukutai speaking at a planting of a totora tree on Maungawhau, 1929.

Rukutai was a key figure to urban Māori advocacy in Auckland, working as chairman and treasurer of the Akarana Māori Association. He advocated for welfare, housing, employment, fair pensions and against prejudice to Māori. He also worked to uplight Māori youth and revitalise art and craft practices.

In 1935, Rukutai presented a speech titled, 'The Māori and His Land Problems, Past and Present' to the Auckland Institute and Museum. He spoke about the impacts of Captain Cook, the signing of the Treaty of Waitangi and conflict between Māori and Pākehā over land. Sir Āpirana Ngata, who was also present, suggested remedy could be made by introduction of farm settlement schemes.

Rukutai also worked as an interpreter and legal advisor in the Supreme Court.

== Death and legacy ==
Rukutai died at his daughter's residence in the Auckland suburb of Onehunga in 1940, aged 62. His funeral took place at St James' in Māngere and was well attending by significant Māori and Pākehā community members.

Rukutai was named one of the New Zealand Rugby League's Legends of League in 2008.
