= Patrick Smyth =

Patrick Smyth may refer to:

- Patrick James Smyth (c. 1823 – 1885), Irish politician and journalist
- Patrick Smyth (runner) (born 1986), American long distance runner
- Patrick Smyth (teacher) (1893–1954), New Zealand educator

== See also ==
- Patrick Smith (disambiguation)
- Patrick Smythe (disambiguation)
