= Lee Lidgard =

- Born: 17 May 1968 (age 58)

Rugby union career
- Position: Prop
Provincial / State sides
Years	Team	Apps	(Points)
1990–99, 2005	Counties Manukau	100	(35)
Super Rugby
Years	Team	Apps	(Points)
1997	Chiefs	5	(0)
1998	Blues	4	(0)
1999	Chiefs	9	(0)

Lee Lidgard (born 17 May 1968) is a New Zealand former professional rugby union player.

A St Stephen's product, Lidgard played as a prop and was a regular fixture in the Counties Manukau front-row throughout the 1990s. He was a NZ Maori representative player and competed in the Super 12 from 1997 to 1999, for the Chiefs and Blues. Soon after being appointed Counties captain in 1999, Lidgard suffered a season-ending neck injury, which sidelined him for two years. He returned to professional rugby in 2001–02 at Italian club Viadana, linking up with his former Counties coach Mac McCallion. In 2005, Lidgard returned to Counties for one final season and brought up his 100th game in their Division 2 semi-final against Nelson Bays.
