= Te Kani Kingi =

New Zealand mental health academic

Te Kani R. Kingi
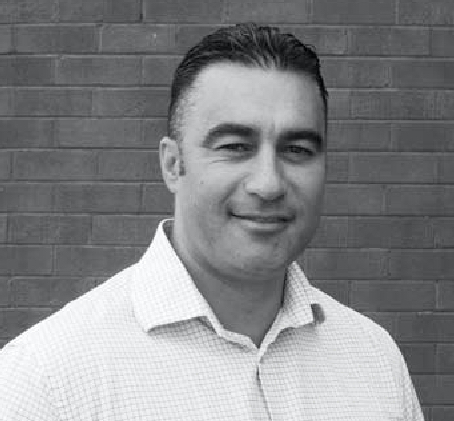
- Education: Massey University
- Scientific career
- Fields: Mental health
- Workplaces: Massey University, Te Whare Wānanga o Awanuiārangi
- Thesis: "Hua oranga" : best health outcomes for Māori (2002)

Te Kani R. Kingi is a New Zealand mental health academic, are Māori, of Ngāti Pūkeko and Ngāti Awa descent and as of 2019 is a full professor at Te Whare Wānanga o Awanuiārangi.

== Academic career ==
After a 2002 PhD titled "Hua oranga": best health outcomes for Māori at Massey University, Kingi moved to the Te Whare Wānanga o Awanuiārangi, rising to full professor.

== Selected works ==
- Baxter, Joanne, Te Kani Kingi, Rees Tapsell, Mason Durie, Magnus A. Mcgee, and New Zealand Mental Health Survey Research Team. "Prevalence of mental disorders among M a ori in Te Rau Hinengaro: The New Zealand Mental Health Survey." Australian and New Zealand Journal of Psychiatry 40, no. 10 (2006): 914–923.
- Kingi, Te Kani. "The Treaty of Waitangi: A framework for Maori health development." New Zealand Journal of Occupational Therapy 54, no. 1 (2007): 4.
- Kingi, Te Kani, and M. H. Durie. "Hua Oranga: A Māori measure of mental health outcome." In Proceedings of the conference, Mental Health Outcomes Research in Aotearoa, Health Research Council Auckland, pp. 10–66. 2000.
- Morton, Susan MB, Polly E. Atatoa Carr, Cameron C. Grant, Elizabeth M. Robinson, Dinusha K. Bandara, Amy Bird, Vivienne C. Ivory et al. "Cohort profile: growing up in New Zealand." International journal of epidemiology 42, no. 1 (2012): 65–75.
- Morton, Susan MB, Cameron C. Grant, Polly E. Atatoa Carr, Elizabeth M. Robinson, Jennifer M. Kinloch, Courtney J. Fleming, Te Kani R. Kingi, Lana M. Perese, and Renee Liang. "How do you recruit and retain a prebirth cohort? Lessons learnt from Growing Up in New Zealand." Evaluation & the Health Professions 37, no. 4 (2014): 411–433.
