= Patrick Smith (skateboarder) =

Patrick Smith or Pat Smith is an American fabricator, carpenter, skateboard ramp builder, skate community contributor, professional skateboarder and skate company owner who lives and works in New York City.

== Early life and education ==
Smith was born in Germany, growing up in a military family. Smith grew up getting re-stationed around the world every 3 years, spending most of his youth outside of Baltimore. Smith grew up skating at Lansdowne Skatepark. Smith studied programming at University of Maryland, Baltimore County.

== Skateboarding career ==
Smith skated for Real Skateboards. After Real, Smith skated for Black Label, appearing in the Label Kills video.

According to Steve Rodriguez, Pat Smith was the first to ollie the doubleset at LES Skatepark. Smith makes an appearance in a Jenkem Magazine's article DISCOVERING EVEN MORE SKATE SPOTS VIA GOOGLE EARTH in 2020.

Patrick Smith emphasizes the need to support your local skate shop. Smith rode for the Pitcrew skate shop in Frederick, Maryland until it closed in 2017.

=== Skate videos appearances ===
Skate video Parts & Appearances	Year
Real – Kicked Out Of Everywhere	1999
Black Out	2002
411VM – Issue 61	2003
5boro – Word of Mouth	2004
CODA – Self Titled	2008
CODA – Slappy Hour	2011

=== Ramp building practice ===
Growing up in rural Maryland, Smith built his own ramps in his early teens out of necessity. Smith has been building ramps his whole life. In 2020, Smith was acknowledged by The New York Times for his contributions to a Long Island DIY skate spot.

==== CODA CURB PROJECT ====
Smith and friends poured and donated long concrete curbs to select New York City skate spots and parks including Blue Park.

=== Coda Skateboards ===
Smith founded Coda Skateboards.
