= Patrick Smythe =

Patrick Smythe may refer to:

- Pat Smythe (priest) (1860–1935), Scottish priest
- Pat Smythe (pianist) (1923–1983), Scottish jazz pianist

== See also ==
- Pat Smythe (1928–1996), British show jumper
- Patrick Smyth (disambiguation)
- Patrick Smith (disambiguation)
