= Patrick Smyth (teacher) =

Teacher from New Zealand

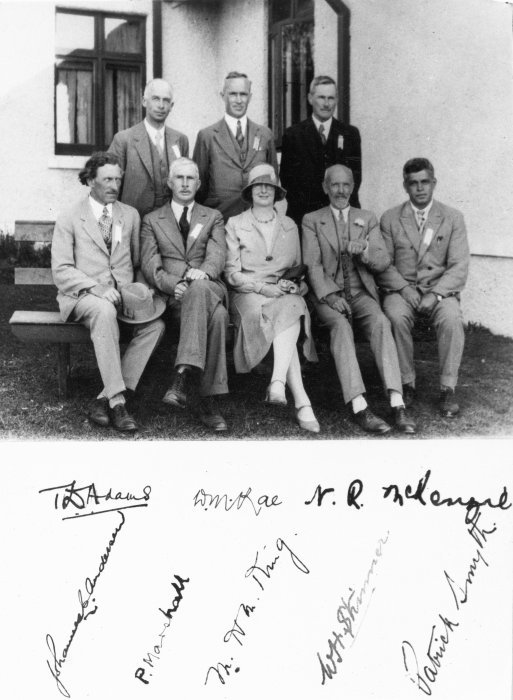
Smyth (seated, right) with other educators in 1930

Patrick Smyth (21 October 1893 – 29 May 1954) was a New Zealand teacher, principal and educationalist. Of Māori descent, he identified with the Ngā Puhi iwi. He was born in Pungaere, Northland, New Zealand in 1893. He published several books on te reo Māori including Maori pronunciation (1930), Maori pronunciation and the evolution of written Maori (1946) and Te reo Maori: a guide to the study of the Maori language (1939).
