= Bombay, New Zealand =

Bombay
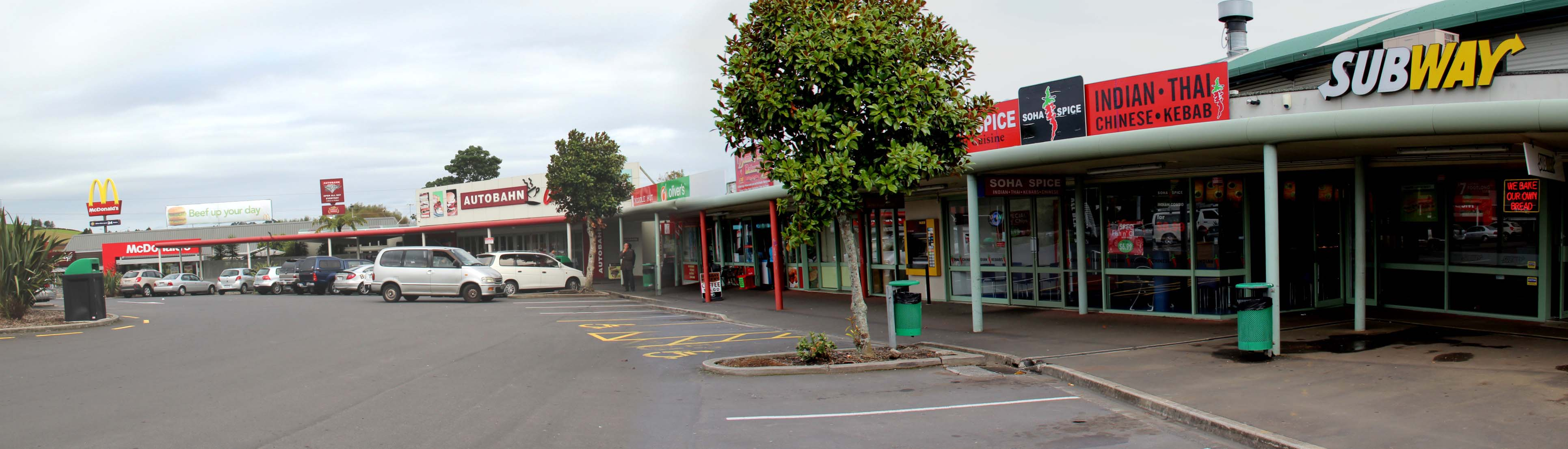
- Bombay motorway service centre
- Interactive map of Bombay
- Coordinates: 37.191°S 174.988°E
- Country: New Zealand
- Region: Auckland Region
- Territorial authority: Auckland Council
- Ward: Franklin ward
- Board: Franklin Local Board
- Electorates: Papakura; Hauraki-Waikato (Māori)

Government
  - Territorial Authority: Auckland Council
  - Mayor of Auckland: Wayne Brown
  - Papakura MP: Vacant
  - Hauraki-Waikato MP: Hana-Rawhiti Maipi-Clarke

Area
  - Total: 1.47 km^{2} (0.57 sq mi)

Population (June 2025)
  - Total: 520
  - Density: 350/km^{2} (920/sq mi)
- Postcode: 2675
- Area code: 09

Bombay is a rural community in the Bombay Hills at the southern boundary of Auckland Region of New Zealand. The Auckland Southern Motorway runs through Bombay.

Bombay is named for the ship Bombay, which transported settlers from England to the area in 1863. At the beginning of the 20th century, a community of Indian New Zealanders also settled in the area. A Sikh temple was opened in 2004.

== Demographics ==
Statistics New Zealand describes Bombay as a rural settlement, which covers 1.47 km^{2} (0.57 sq mi). It had an estimated population of 520 as of June 2025, with a population density of 354 people per km^{2}. Bombay is part of the larger Bombay Hills statistical area.

Historical population
Year	Pop.	±% p.a.
2006	435	—
2013	258	−7.19%
2018	438	+11.17%
2023	504	+2.85%
The 2006 population is for a significantly larger area of 5.88 km^{2}. Source:

Bombay had a population of 504 in the 2023 New Zealand census, an increase of 66 people (15.1%) since the 2018 census, and an increase of 246 people (95.3%) since the 2013 census. There were 237 males and 264 females in 156 dwellings. 1.2% of people identified as LGBTIQ+. The median age was 43.0 years (compared with 38.1 years nationally). There were 99 people (19.6%) aged under 15 years, 90 (17.9%) aged 15 to 29, 234 (46.4%) aged 30 to 64, and 81 (16.1%) aged 65 or older.

People could identify as more than one ethnicity. The results were 84.5% European (Pākehā); 14.9% Māori; 4.8% Pasifika; 10.7% Asian; 1.2% Middle Eastern, Latin American and African New Zealanders (MELAA); and 1.2% other, which includes people giving their ethnicity as "New Zealander". English was spoken by 97.6%, Samoan by 0.6%, and other languages by 10.7%. No language could be spoken by 1.8% (e.g. too young to talk). The percentage of people born overseas was 16.1, compared with 28.8% nationally.

Religious affiliations were 34.5% Christian, 2.4% Hindu, 2.4% Islam, 0.6% Māori religious beliefs, 0.6% Buddhist, and 1.8% other religions. People who answered that they had no religion were 48.8%, and 8.9% of people did not answer the census question.

Of those at least 15 years old, 72 (17.8%) people had a bachelor's or higher degree, 258 (63.7%) had a post-high school certificate or diploma, and 69 (17.0%) people exclusively held high school qualifications. The median income was $53,700, compared with $41,500 nationally. 78 people (19.3%) earned over $100,000 compared to 12.1% nationally. The employment status of those at least 15 was that 237 (58.5%) people were employed full-time, 57 (14.1%) were part-time, and 6 (1.5%) were unemployed.

== Education ==
Bombay School is a coeducational full primary school (years 1–8) with a roll of 372 as of July 2026. The school opened in 1872.

Tīpene / St Stephen's School is an Anglican secondary boarding school for boys.
