= NISOA =

The National Intercollegiate Soccer Officials Association (NISOA) is the organization responsible for improving the quality of officiating at college soccer matches in the United States.
