= Bert Leatherbarrow =

Rugby league player (1909–1983)

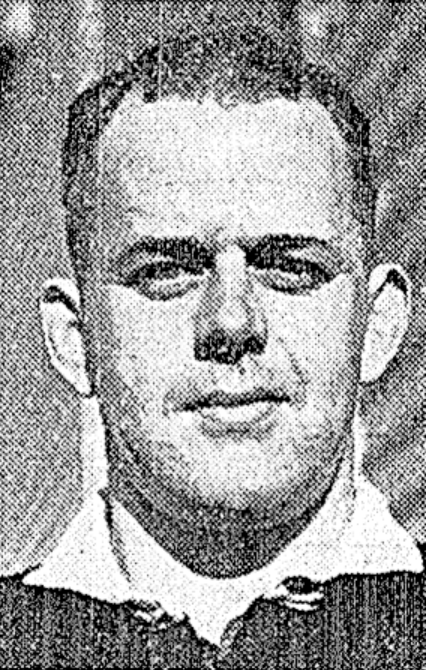
- Leatherbarrow in 1939

Personal information
- Born: 5 October 1909 Prestwich, Greater Manchester, England
- Died: 18 July 1983 (aged 75) Auckland, New Zealand

Playing information
- Height: 5 ft 8.5 in (174 cm)
- Weight: 12 st 6 lb (174 lb; 79 kg)

Rugby league
- Position: Hooker, Prop
Club
Years	Team	Pld	T	G	FG	P
1931–35	Devonport	44	14	0	0	42
1932	Newton XIII (guest)	1	2	0	0	6
1935–36	Ponsonby	29	11	8	0	49
1937–41	Mt Albert	96	45	38	0	211
1942	Newton-Mt Albert	1	0	1	0	2
1943	Mt Albert	5	3	10	0	29
1943–44	City Rovers	22	3	0	0	9
	Total	198	78	57	0	348
Representative
Years	Team	Pld	T	G	FG	P
1931	Auckland Colts	1	0	0	0	0
1932–39	New Zealand Trial	4	5	0	0	15
1932–41	Auckland	10	1	0	0	3
1932	Auckland XIII	1	1	0	0	3
1938–40	Auckland Pākehā	3	1	0	0	3
1939	New Zealand	1	1	0	0	3

Rugby union
Club
Years	Team	Pld	T	G	FG	P
1935	Eastern (Waitoa)	1	0	0	0	0

Bert Leatherbarrow (5 October 1909 – 18 July 1983) was a rugby league player who represented New Zealand in 1939 on their aborted tour of England becoming the 275th player to represent New Zealand. Leatherbarrow played in their second and final tour match against Dewsbury. He played ten matches for Auckland from 1932 to 1941 and three matches for Auckland Pākehā. Leatherbarrow played his club rugby league for Devonport, Ponsonby, Mount Albert, and City in the Auckland Rugby League first grade competition from 1931 to 1944.

== Early life ==
Bert (Bertie) Leatherbarrow was born in Prestwich, Metropolitan Borough of Bury Lancashire, Greater Manchester, in England on 5 October 1909. His parents were Albert Leatherbarrow (1872–1921) and Beatrice Amelia Underhill (1872–?) He was baptised on 4 January 1910 at Prestwich. The family migrated to New Zealand onboard the Rimutaka ship on 15 October 1912 when Bert was aged 2, and his older sister Beatrice Leatherbarrow (1907–?) was 6 and older brother Harry Leatherbarrow (1904–1979) was 7.

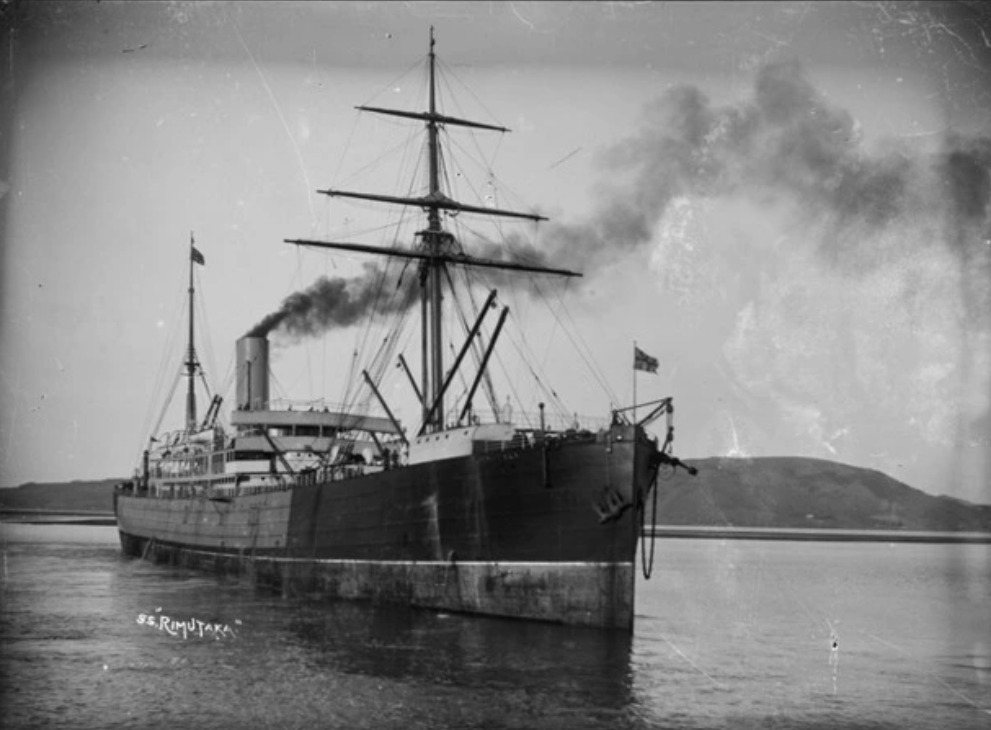
The Rimutaka ship their family came to New Zealand on.

The family lived in the Devonport suburb on Auckland’s North Shore with Bert and his older brother Harry initially playing football for the North Shore club through the 1910s. In 1918 their parents published a personal thank you in the New Zealand Herald for Albert’s “fellow workers, and all those who so generously assisted them in their time of need and trouble, especially Nurse Lawrence and Mr. Smithers”. In 1921 Albert died on 14 September “after years of suffering”. At some point after this the family moved to the Taranaki area with Bert attending Awakino School in 1923. They then returned to Auckland and were living in the Devonport area once more.

== Playing career ==
=== North Shore Albion juniors 1920s–1930 ===
Leatherbarrow began playing rugby league for the Devonport United club in the mid 1920s. They were better known in their history as North Shore Albions but were named Devonport United from 1920 to 1936 after they merged with Sunnyside in 1920. In 1927 Leatherbarrow played for their 3rd grade intermediate side. In 1928 he played for the 3rd Grade Open side. During the same year he was fined 20 shillings for “failing to obey a traffic officer”. In 1929 he was still playing in their 3rd Grade side.

The 1930 season saw him still in the 3rd Grade Open team but there was also a Leatherbarrow listed in their 2nd grade side at one point in the season. He was now aged 20. On Saturday, 8 March, Leatherbarrow was caught speeding on the road between Papakura and Pukekohe. He was driving a six-ton lorry which was transporting horses to and from the races at Pukekohe. The lorry was only permitted to travel at 16.8 miles per hour but he was timed several times during the day at speeds varying from 25 miles to 31 miles an hour. He was charged at the Pukekohe Court in early June and was fined £2 10s with 10s costs.

=== Senior debut (1931) ===
By 1931 Leatherbarrow had been promoted to the North Shore reserve grade team. His side won the grade following a 5–5 draw with Ponsonby on 15 August at Carlaw Park. The match was the ‘final’ as it was between the two leading teams though Devonport won as they had a one point competition lead. Leatherbarrow was playing with Albert Laing who later became a New Zealand representative, and several future senior players including John Harding, Arthur Saxon, Alf Smith, George Radonich, Horace Hunt, and J Hawkes. He was named in the emergency reserves for the senior side for their 5 September match with Marist Old Boy but the match was postponed due to the weather. The two teams played the following weekend but it is unlikely he played as he was listed 17th in an 18 player list. The established hooker in the side was R Masefield.

The following weekend Leatherbarrow made his senior debut playing in the loose forwards against Ponsonby in the Roope Rooster knockout final at Carlaw Park. The Auckland Star newspaper said that he was “always in the thick of it” amongst the rest of the forwards. Devonport won 34 to 17 with Leatherbarrow scoring one of their tries. It came when their captain Allan Seagar “ran to Ponsonby’s twenty-five and passed to Leatherbarrow who scored between the posts”. Later in the first half he “appeared to score” but the try was seemingly not allowed. In comments on the game the New Zealand Herald wrote that “Casey and Leatherbarrow played fine football among the forwards”. Two weeks later on 3 October he played in the Stormont Shield final against Marist. Devonport won 25 to 6 with Leatherbarrow said to have “raided effectively” with the other forwards. With the score 7–3 in the first half “a snap pass by Leatherbarrow allowed Masefield to go over”, although the Herald said that it was Hugh Simpson who scored after Leatherbarrow’s pass.

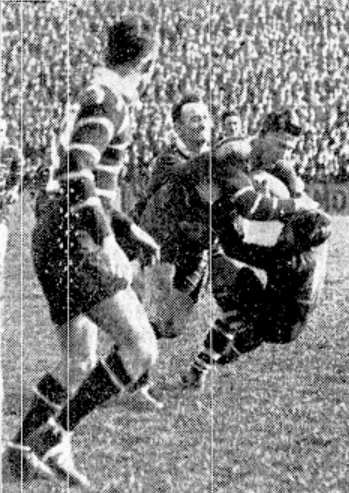
Leatherbarrow tackling Ray Stehr along with S. Casey in Devonport's match with Eastern Suburbs.

Leatherbarrow was then named to play for Devonport against the touring Eastern Suburbs side from Sydney, Australia. He played in the second row with Ernest Ruby, up against Max Nixon, and Joe Pearce. Pearce represented Australia from 1932 to 1937. Before a crowd at Carlaw Park of 17,000 the Devonport side lost 41–27. Leatherbarrow was mentioned among the forwards for “fine raiding” which “troubled the visitors and made things difficult for Billy Hong the Eastern Suburbs fullback. A photograph of Leatherbarrow appeared in the Herald, where he and Casey are tackling Ray Stehr.

His final game of the season was against the same Eastern Suburbs side on 21 October however this time he was named at prop in an Auckland Colts side. He was marking Ray Stehr. The Colts side lost 18 to 13 but were said to have gone well. At the conclusion of the season the Auckland Rugby League arranged a charity day to raise money for St John Ambulance Brigade which included a seven-a-side tournament with Leatherbarrow named in a ten man Devonport squad.

=== Devonport, Auckland, and New Zealand trial (1932) ===
In 1932 Leatherbarrow became established in the Devonport first grade side and also went on to make his Auckland debut and also make a New Zealand trial side. He was initially included in the Devonport reserve grade team for the early rounds but on 11 June he was chosen in the first grade side and would remain in that grade for the rest of his career. In his senior debut match Devonport was playing Ponsonby in round 6 of the Fox Memorial Shield. Leatherbarrow was “prominent” along with Ernest Ruby and S. Casey. Early in the game Devonport attacked and he looked like scoring but was ruled offside.

He was named in the side to play Richmond on 18 June and then in the round 8 game against Newton on 25 June he scored two tries in an 18–17 win on Carlaw Park 2. He was said to have “played his best game to date [and] showed uncanny anticipation in the loose. His two tries did much to turn the tables on a greatly improved Newton side”. Midway through the first half he “picked up in the ruck and dived over”, then late in the match he scored following a “melee” near the try line. He played against Marist on 2 July and then there was a break in the club competition with the England side touring. Leatherbarrow, despite only playing a handful of games was chosen in the reserves for an Auckland trial match but was not required to play.

A week later Leatherbarrow was selected in a New Zealand trial match to be played on 23 July. He was chosen in the second row of the Probables team alongside Alan Clarke (Marist). Although the match was a New Zealand trial the teams were entirely made up of Auckland players with the exception of Edwin Abbott from the Waikato. Their second row opponents were Doug McLeay (Ponsonby), and A Hobbs (City). The match was played as a curtain raiser to the North Island v South Island annual match. His Probables side lost 37 to 16 with the backs playing poorly and only Leatherbarrow and S. Casey playing “good forward games”. Leatherbarrow scored a try midway through the first half.

The club competition resumed on 13 August with Devonport losing 19–13 to City. The Auckland Star wrote that “Leatherbarrow and [Arthur] Sowter in the Devonport pack were a good pair”. Early in the second half with Devonport trailing 7–4, Leatherbarrow missed a try when he failed to “gather a high pass right in front of the posts”. Despite the loss Devonport won the championship as they had an unassailable lead in the competition. It was their fourth title in their history following wins in 1913, 1914, and 1928. They then played in the Roope Rooster knockout competition though were eliminated immediately by Marist on 3 September. Of their performance “Sowter, Leatherbarrow and Casey showed out in an even bunch of Devonport forwards”. He just failed to score a try and was “outstanding” according to the New Zealand Herald.

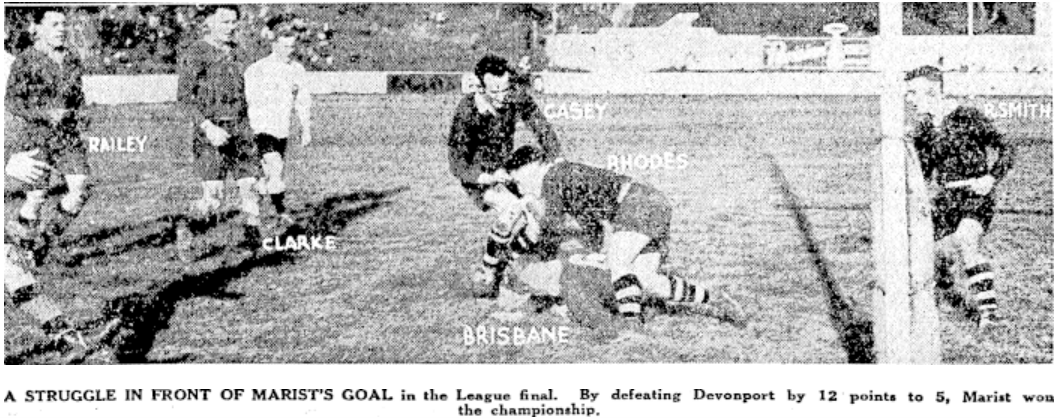
Play in the championship decider which Devonport lost 12–5 to Marist on 8 August. Leatherbarrow was injured during the match.

On 17 September Devonport played Marist in the Stormont Shield match. Devonport lost 15 to 8 with the play having to be stopped for a while during the second half when Leatherbarrow was injured near the halfway line. His final game of the season for Devonport came against City on 24 September. The game was between the two teams who secured the equal most championship points in the second round. Devonport lost 22–19 with Leatherbarrow said to have been an “honest grafter” with other forwards for the losers. When trailing 22–3 early in the second half he improved an attacking movement that led to Sowter scoring. Leatherbarrow was said to have been “perhaps the most outstanding” Devonport forward along with Hugh Simpson.

==== Auckland selection v Lower Waikato ====
In late September, Leatherbarrow was named by selectors Bert Avery, Ernie Asher, and William (Bill) Mincham to make his debut for Auckland against Lower Waikato at Huntly on the Recreation Ground on 2 October. The match was for the Sunshine Cup and was a charity match to raise funds for the Sunshine organisation. He was originally selected in the second row with Ray Lawless though seemingly played at lock with Lawless and Doug McLeay in the second row. Leatherbarrow scored one of their seven tries in a 35 to 8 win. His try came in the second half after it was 5–2 to Auckland.

The following weekend Leatherbarrow was chosen to play in a Newton Rangers XIII which was travelling to Hikurangi, north of Whangārei on 8 October. The Newton XIII won 18 to 5 with Leatherbarrow scoring two of their four tries, with Trevor Hall scoring the other two and Albert Laing kicking three conversions. His final game of the season came in an Auckland XIII named “The Rest” which was playing Marist on 17 October. It was a benefit game to raise money for Trevor Hanlon a former Richmond Rovers player who had fallen on hard times while playing professionally in England. Leatherbarrow was said to be the best forward for his side along with Heck Lunn. In the first half he took a pass from Stan Prentice who had “burst through” and scored a try. Then later in the half he returned a clearing kick by Marist full back Claude Dempsey back to halfway which eventually led to a try to Lunn.

=== Devonport and Auckland (1933) ===
In 1933 Leatherbarrow played 14 games for Devonport scoring seven tries, and five games for Auckland. His first game of the season was at prop on 29 April against Ponsonby on Carlaw Park 2. Devonport won 26–13 with Leatherbarrow among the best of their forwards. The New Zealand Herald also said he was the best of the forwards along with second rower Ted Scott. During the second half he passed to Alf Smith on the wing who used his pace to score. A week later in round 2 he scored a try in a 10–5 win against Marist while playing in the second row. He gave “fine support” to Hugh Simpson and Ted Scott. In the first half he “scored from a loose scrum near the line”. Then in the second half he and Masefield “relieved with a loose rush”.

Leatherbarrow scored another try in an upset loss to Newton, 11–8. Late in the game he and others “made mighty bids” to stage a comeback win. His try was a “surprise try” started by winger, C. Rhodes. Rhodes had got possession on the wing and “running across he beat several defenders in a splendid run before in-passing to Leatherbarrow, who scored between the posts”. He scored once more in an 18–17 win over Richmond. He, John Donald, and Len Barchard “were the best forwards”. Leatherbarrow played in a 24–13 win over City, and then a 14–13 win over Ponsonby in round 6. He along with Hugh Simpson, John Donald, and Arthur Sowter “were a resourceful forward quartet”. In the second half he was involved “in snappy passing” with Simpson before Donald scored. The Devonport forward positions appeared very fluid around this time with Masefield largely playing at hooker, but Leatherbarrow playing at lock, second row, prop and at least once at hooker.

==== Auckland v Taranaki ====
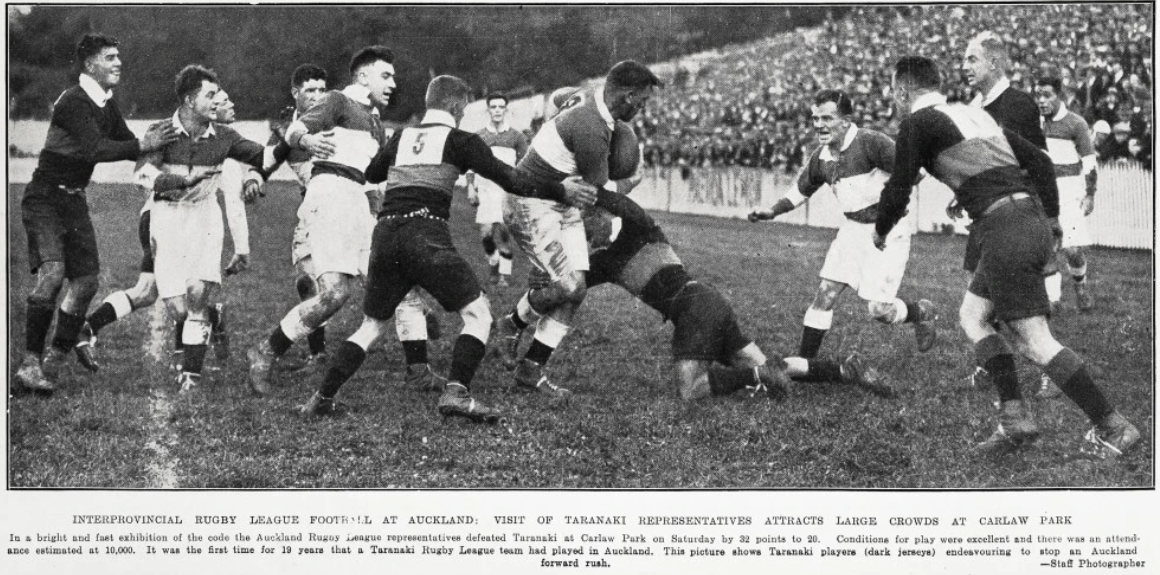
Leatherbarrow second from the left supporting the attack

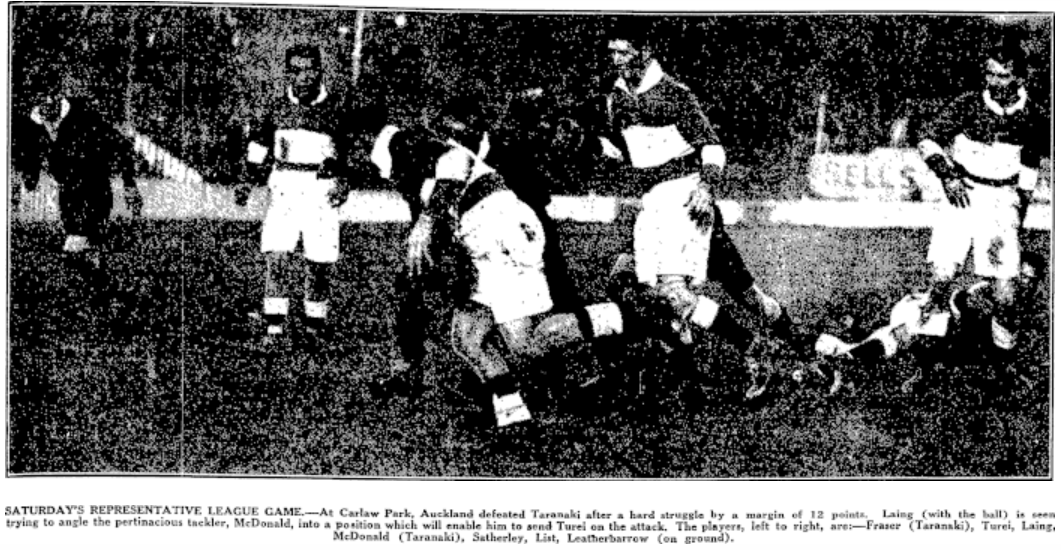
Leatherbarrow lying on the ground looking back at the play

Following round 6 Leatherbarrow was chosen for the Auckland side by selectors Ernie Asher, William (Bill) Mincham, and Bert Avery to play Taranaki on 10 June at Carlaw Park. He was chosen at prop along with Stan Clark, with Gordon Campbell hooking. They were up against a front row of Jack McLeod, Doug McLeay, and J Fraser. Auckland won 32–20 before a large crowd of 10,000. The Auckland Star wrote that he and Cliff Satherley “ably supported” Jim Laird and Ray Lawless. The Herald said that Leatherbarrow and Stan Clark “were always in the thick of the fray”.

Returning to Devonport, Leatherbarrow scored a try in a 35–11 loss to Marist. He was among the pick of the Devonport forwards. Hec Brisbane, the Marist captain had his kick charged down and Leatherbarrow got the rebound and scored between the posts. It was described as "a fine opportunist's try" where he "dashed over in a flash" after gathering the ball. Devonport then beat Newton 11–5 with Leatherbarrow scoring another try. It came near the end of the game when their “forwards swept over the opposition and Leatherbarrow scored”.

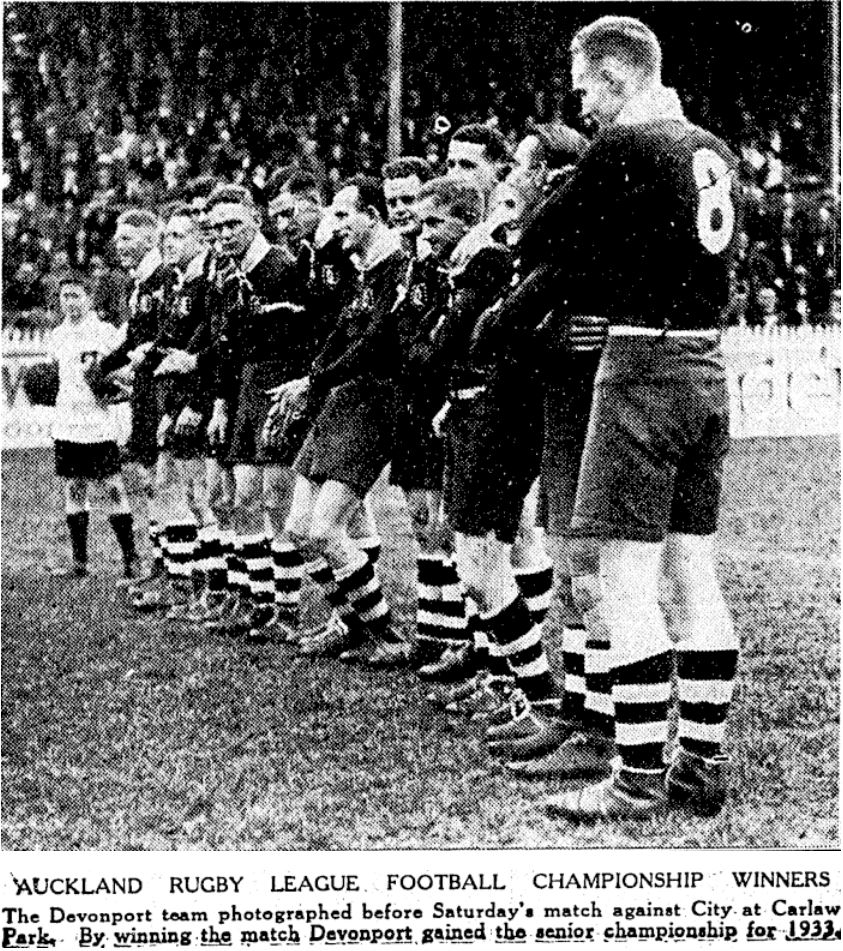
The Devonport side which won the championship. Leatherbarrow is near the centre looking in the direction of the camera

In round 9 he was said to have been “prominent” in a 5–5 draw with Richmond. He then scored a try in a 17–2 win against City in the final round of the Fox Memorial competition which secured them their second straight championship. Before the biggest club crowd of the season of 10,000 Leatherbarrow “was brilliant in all departments”. In the first half John Donald “made a good opening for Leatherbarrow, who just reached his objective in a handy position”. In the second half following a centre kick he crossed the line but was ruled offside.

He was selected to play for Auckland against South Auckland (Waikato) on 15 July. Incumbent hooker Gordon Campbell was unavailable due to injury with Leatherbarrow taking that position. Despite playing in various positions for Devonport earlier in the season and prop in his earlier game for Auckland he had recently been playing hooker for Devonport. Auckland struggled and lost 14–0 in the match to lose the Northern Union trophy.

Devonport were knocked out of round 1 of the Roope Rooster knockout competition on 29 July with Leatherbarrow and Donald “the pick of a solid set of forwards”.

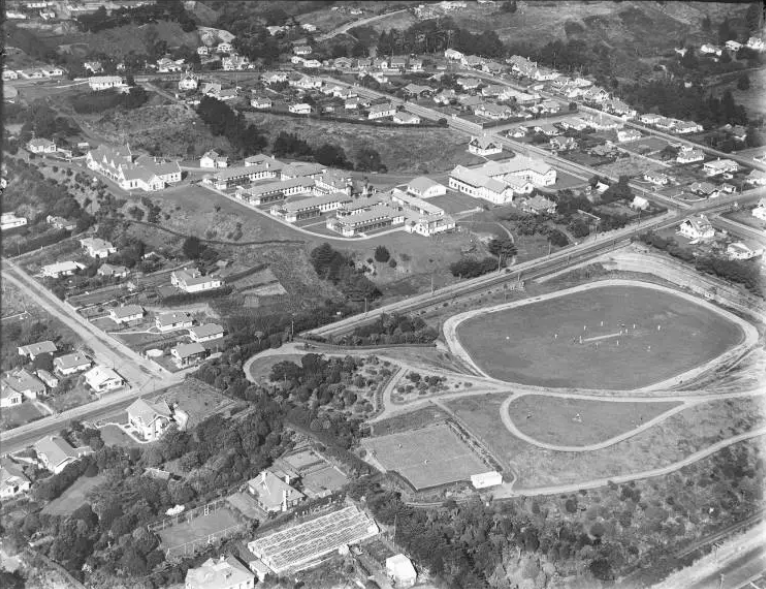
Western Park to the right in 1929.

He was selected in the Auckland side to travel to New Plymouth to play a return match against Taranaki. Auckland was not at full strength as Richmond and Marist were playing a Roope Rooster semi final on the same day in Auckland meaning the Auckland side was only made up of Devonport, City, Newton, and Ponsonby players. The match was played at Western Park before a crowd of 2,000 with Auckland winning 25–17 with Leatherbarrow at hooker between props Stan Clark and John Donald. They were up against the same front row as in their earlier match. Early in the second half with Auckland leading 14–0, William McLaughlin, Leatherbarrow, and John Donald broke away and a “handling bout” by those three ended in Donald scoring. He was selected for Auckland again for the following weekends match against Northland the following weekend Leatherbarrow was named as one of two forward reserves but was not required to play.

Returning to his Devonport side he was among the best Devonport forwards in a 9–3 win on 19 August. During the week he was chosen as an emergency player in Auckland’s match with the West Coast at Carlaw Park on 26 August. However Gordon Campbell was unable to play so Leatherbarrow took his place in the hooker position. Before a crowd of 8,000 Auckland struggled to a 28–22 win against a strong West Coast side. The Auckland forwards played well but Leatherbarrow “failed to get the ball in the set scrums” where he was opposed by H. Hunt. Campbell then returned to the side at hooker for their game against Hawke's Bay a week later with Leatherbarrow in the reserves. On 9 September Auckland played their final representative match of the season against South Auckland. Leatherbarrow was selected to play, replacing Ray Lawless in the loose forwards who was unable to play due to injury. Auckland won the match 17 to 5.

The season was drawing to a close but Devonport had two important games left. The first was against Richmond for the Stormont Shield on 16 September. Devonport won the Stormont Shield for the 3rd time with a 12–7 win with Leatherbarrow at prop. For the first try “Leatherbarrow and [Arthur] Sowter smashed through on the blind side of a breaking scrum” then “Sowter picked up and went on to score easily”. In comments on the game the Auckland Star wrote that he “played well” in the forwards.

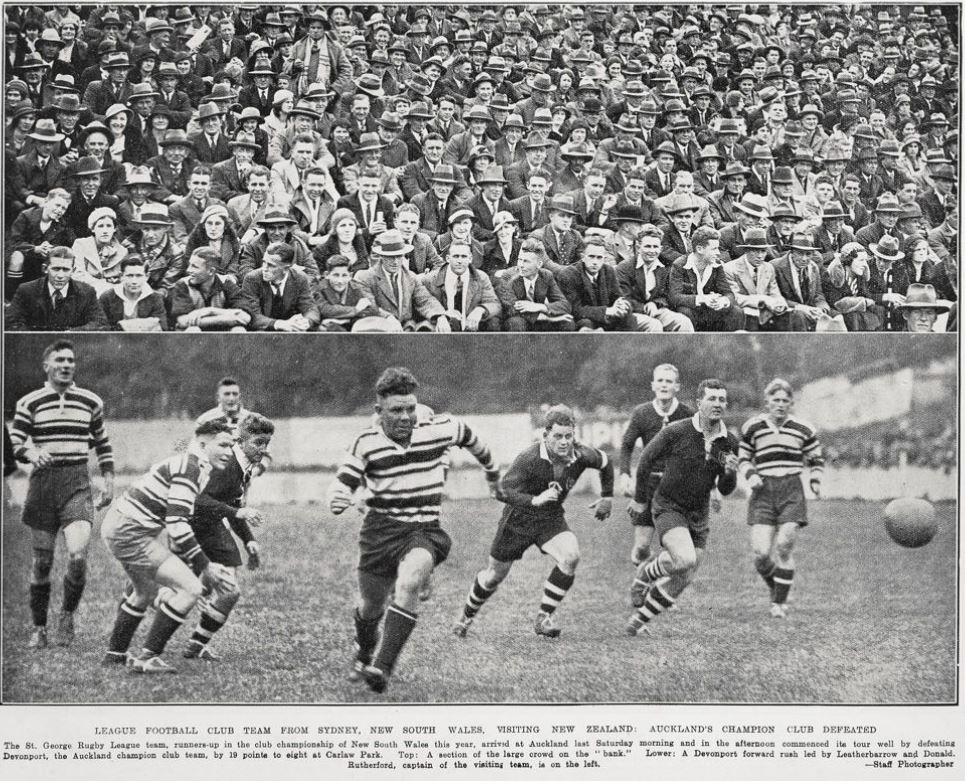
Jim Rutherford of St George chasing the ball with Bert Leatherbarrow and John Donald of Devonport following behind.

Their last game was against the touring St George side which had finished runner up in the 1933 NSWRFL season. Devonport were their first opponents of the tour with St George winning 19 to 8 before a crowd of 8,000 at Carlaw Park. Leatherbarrow was at hooker, up against Percy Fairall of St George who would go on to represent Australia from 1935 to 1938. A photo of him chasing the ball was published in the New Zealand Herald following the game. Leatherbarrow scored one of Devonport’s two tries. It came in the second half when the “forwards broke away in the loose and Dick Smith dribbled over, Leatherbarrow gaining the touch down in a good position. The conversion made the score 14–8 to St George but they scored another converted try near full-time to widen the margin.

=== Devonport (1934) ===
The 1934 season saw Leatherbarrow play 17 games for Devonport, scoring four tries. It was to be his final season with them. His first game was on 28 April against City Rovers where he played at his now familiar position of hooker however as the season went on he often played in the loose forwards with L Stevens the former Ponsonby hooker in that position. Devonport lost 12–7 and their forwards “Donald, Leatherbarrow, Hunt, and Sowter worked hard enough, but did not seem to have quite the driving force of their opponents”. They lost again, 17–2 to Ponsonby in round 2. They were criticised with the New Zealand Herald saying “Devonport is not yet playing as the team which won the championship last season. It seems unable to settle down to correct team play and on this account lost three great scoring chances on Saturday. In two of these failure by Leatherbarrow to take his pass lost tries”.

Devonport’s 3rd round game saw them in the number 2 field at Carlaw Park and another loss, 18–8 to Newton. Leatherbarrow was “prominent” along with Donald and Sowter in their forwards. Two more losses followed against Marist (10–16) on 19 May and then Richmond (9–16) on 26 May. The Richmond side was particularly strong with New Zealand representatives Ray Lawless and Cliff Satherley in their forwards. They were said to have “met their match in Donald, Simpson and Leatherbarrow”.

Devonport finally had a win in round 6 against City by 18 points to 15. Leatherbarrow scored two tries including the last minute winner where he “barged across from the ruck” and “was temporarily incapacitated”. The Auckland Star said that he “stamped himself a fine Shore forward”. While the New Zealand Herald singled him out with Donald as the best of the forwards. He scored again in another win, this time 10–0 over Ponsonby on 9 June and was among their best forwards. His try scoring run continued with another in a 10–6 win against Newton the following weekend. He was once again named as one of their “best packmen” and played a “good game”. In an 8–8 draw with Marist, Leatherbarrow “did good work” with Ted Scott.

Leatherbarrow was selected to practice for the Auckland team which was preparing for a game against Taranaki on 30 June. There were nine forwards chosen however when the team was named he was only named in the reserves with his Devonport team mate L Stevens chosen at hooker and Cliff Satherley, Ray Lawless, and Lou Hutt in the loose forwards. He played for Devonport in round 10 and 11 against Richmond and City respectively before a one point loss to Ponsonby on 21 July. He, along with Ted Scott and Hugh Simpson “were the best trio of packmen in the match, Leatherbarrow hunted ruthlessly…”. In their final championship match on 4 August Devonport won 7–0 to finish fourth of the six teams. He was among Devonport’s “leading forwards”.

Devonport continued their relatively poor season with a 26–5 loss to Richmond in round 1 of the Roope Rooster knockout competition. Leatherbarrow was among the “best of the keen North Shore sextet”. In the consolation Phelan Shield knockout competition they beat Papakura 13–6 before an 11–8 loss to Newton. At the conclusion of the season Devonport travelled to Hikurangi in Northland to play Northland on 15 September. Leatherbarrow played at lock, opposed by Hazell of Northland and was involved in Simpson’s first half try in a 17–11 win. When the teams resumed after halftime Leatherbarrow had switched places with Miller and now found himself in the five eighths alongside Ted Scott and opposed by Bob White and former New Zealand five eighth Ted Meyer. With Devonport trailing 11–9 Leatherbarrow had a simple chance to score after taking a pass from Scott however he “mulled… and the points went a-begging”. Leatherbarrow was initially selected in a 17 player squad to play for a Ponsonby XIII against the touring Western Suburbs on 3 October. However he was not chosen in the final side.

=== Transfer to Ponsonby (1935) ===
In 1935 Leatherbarrow transferred to the Ponsonby United club where he played 14 games scoring four tries and kicking a conversion. It was reported on 24 April that Devonport would miss his services as he was “away from town”. Leatherbarrow was in fact in Waitoa in the Waikato possibly for work and was briefly involved with the Eastern rugby union club. It appears that he only played one game for them on 4 May against City. In the first half he was involved in a movement where he sent the ball to Woolford who scored in the corner. In the second half he supported Gallagher who had evaded several defenders and received the ball however he had no team mates nearby and City cleared the threat. Eastern lost 5–3. It was reported in mid May that Leatherbarrow had been granted a transfer by Devonport to play for Ponsonby and that he was “presently residing at Waitoa”. Waitoa was a small town between Morrinsville and Te Aroha in the Waikato region.

Leatherbarrow’s first game for Ponsonby was in round 4 of the Fox Memorial championship on 18 May. Ponsonby lost 22–5 and he was said to have been “not so prominent as usual”. He was officially reinstated to rugby league during the following week by the Auckland Rugby League. Then two weeks later it was ratified by the New Zealand Council. His first try for Ponsonby came the following weekend in an 18–16 win over Newton at Carlaw Park. His try equalised the scores at 16–16 with Roy Bright’s conversion winning the game. Leatherbarrow was said to have been “prominent” along with fellow forwards Lyle Rogers and Lou Hutt. Against Mount Albert in round 6 “Hutt and Leatherbarrow were the pick of the vanguard” in a 23–13 loss. In round 7 he played his former Devonport side which won 30–16 but he was one of the “best forwards”. Against Marist on 22 June in an 8–3 loss he was a “solid packman” with Rogers and John Stockley.

In round 10 Ponsonby played City on the number 2 field at Carlaw Park. The two captains decided to play 30 minute halves instead of the normal 40 minutes and it may have cost Ponsonby the win. They lost 10–8 and were attacking for a long time in the second half with Leatherbarrow at one point held up over the tryline. It was said that he and J Moran “were the best of the scrummagers”. In an 11–11 draw with Richmond he was “most conspicuous” in the forwards with Lou Hutt and J Moran. Leatherbarrow was next mentioned in round 14 when Ponsonby lost to Mount Albert 17–11 as being one of their “willing forwards”.

During the following week Leatherbarrow was named among the reserves for the Auckland B and Auckland A teams which were playing South Auckland (Waikato), and Taranaki respectively. The games were played on 3 August at Carlaw Park. He was listed as the solitary reserve for the match day sides but was ultimately not required to take the field. In round 1 of the Roope Rooster, Ponsonby lost 28–16 to City with Leatherbarrow scoring a try and kicking a conversion. He scored two more tries against Otahuhu in the Phelan Shield preliminary semi finals in an easy 27–3 win on 31 August. Where he was said to have also been “prominent”. They then beat City 20–10 in the semi finals but no team list was published and Leatherbarrow was not mentioned in the match report and his name was missing from the team list for the final which Ponsonby won 11–8 over Mount Albert.

=== Ponsonby (1936) ===
The 1936 season saw Leatherbarrow once again fail to make any representative teams. He played 18 games for Ponsonby scoring eight tries and kicking six goals. This marked the first real year where he took goal kicks on occasion. Leatherbarrow scored a try in a special round of matches on 18 April to raise money for Jim Laird from the Marist club who had suffered a career ending knee injury in October of the previous season. The try helped them to a 21–17 win over City. In late April in a New Zealand Herald piece on the playing prospects for each team it was said that “Leatherbarrow and [John] Stockley are also available” for Ponsonby. It was also stated that Bert Cooke, the famous ex-All Black who had been playing for Richmond for three seasons would coach the Ponsonby side.

He began the championship proper playing at prop on 2 May against Richmond at Carlaw Park. Ponsonby lost 21–10 though Leatherbarrow was “in the van when there was work to be done”. In a 21–10 win against City in round 2 Leatherbarrow “played well” and “got one runaway try, showing a surprisingly long burst of sustained speed which kept him clear of persistent City pursuit”. He played in games against Manukau, Mount Albert, and Marist through May, before scoring a try against Newton on 6 June in round 6 which Ponsonby won 22–10. A win over Devonport was followed by a loss to Richmond 15–6 in round 8 where “the work of [Edgar] Morgan and Leatherbarrow in the loose deserved a better result”.

Leatherbarrow was named in the Ponsonby side to play each week however was not mentioned specifically in a match report until the final championship game in round 14 on 29 August. Ponsonby beat Devonport to finish 5th of the 8 teams and he “stood out in the Ponsonby forwards” with Blood and Morgan. In round 1 of the Roope Rooster knockout competition he was named in the reserve grade side though returned to the first grade side the following week in round 1 of the consolation Phelan Shield against Mount Albert. He had the biggest scoring match of his career to this point where he scored two tries and kicked three conversions for 12 points in a 23–13 victory on the Carlaw Park 2 field. He was among “the best of the forwards” for Ponsonby. Just a week later he exceeded his scoring feat by crossing for three tries and kicking two conversions and a penalty for 15 points in a 36–4 win over Papakura in the Phelan Shield semi finals. Then in a 19–15 win against his former side, Devonport in the major semi-final he was among “the best forwards” and “played good football”. His final game of the season was the Phelan Shield final which Ponsonby won 13–9 over Marist on 3 October. He was listed at hooker in the team lineup published the day before the match.

=== Transfer to Mount Albert (1937), New Zealand trial and Auckland appearances ===
The 1937 season saw Leatherbarrow return to representative rugby league for the first time since 1933. It was also marked by another club transfer, this time moving to the relatively new Mount Albert United club which has only begun playing first grade in 1935 and was based at Fowlds Park in the suburb Mt Albert. He played 19 games for them scoring nine tries and kicking two conversions. He went on to play for Mount Albert until 1943, scoring over 200 points in 115 games. During the season he also played in a New Zealand trial match and one game for Auckland which was his seventh Auckland appearance.

Leatherbarrow played his first game for Mount Albert in the second round of the preliminary matches. Their opponents were City on 24 April. It was reported that he had scored a try on debut but it was later corrected that it was Richard Shadbolt who had scored the try. In round 2 on 8 May Leatherbarrow scored his first points for his new side in a 22–15 win over City. He gained two tries and “stood out” along with Richard Shadbolt, Des Herring, and Joseph Gunning. Leatherbarrow was said to have been “very conspicuous in the loose play”. In a 13–0 win against North Shore on 29 May he played as hooker and was “in fine form” in that position. He scored a try in a 10–7 loss to Marist in round 6 and “did well for Mount Albert” with their scrum showing “mastery”. He was prominent in a 6–3 win over City on 10 July along with forwards Des Herring and Jack Tristram. Then in a 29–5 win against Newton he scored a try and kicked a conversion. He was also prominent in the scrums which secured Mount Albert a lot of possession.

==== New Zealand trial ====
Leatherbarrow was then selected in a New Zealand trial match to play for the Possibles against the Probables in a midweek match on 28 July. The match was to help decide the New Zealand team to play the touring Australia side. He was chosen at hooker with the props being Bill Telford and Angus Gault. The opposition front row was Billy Glynn (hooker), and Joe Cootes and Bill Breed the props. Leatherbarrow’s Possibles side won 25–11 and in post match comments the Auckland Star wrote on the forward selections that “the first choice must be a hooker, and although there is not a [Sam] Lowry or a [Wally] Somers in sight, either Leatherbarrow or Glynn, the West Coast player, would be a good choice. The latter was about the outstanding forward of the match”. Glynn was the incumbent New Zealand hooker having played for New Zealand in 1935 and 1936 and he was ultimately preferred again for the 1937 New Zealand side.

Returning to his Mount Albert side days later he “shaded K. Brown in the hooking” in a 20–0 win over Ponsonby. He played in games against Manukau and North Shore to finish the championship in second place, one point behind Richmond. In round 1 of the Roope Rooster competition they beat Manukau 35–18 with Leatherbarrow scoring two of their seven tries. In a good forward pack he was “outstanding” along with Cliff Satherley and Des Herring. They then lost the semi final to North Shore on 28 August before beating City 31–22 in the consolation Phelan Shield knockout competition. Leatherbarrow scored two tries and kicked a conversion in the win. They lost the final to North Shore 22–18 with Leatherbarrow scoring one of their four tries and “gave valuable support” in the forwards. This was their final game of the season and Leatherbarrow finished with nine tries, which was the 7th most of all Auckland club players in first grade matches.

==== Auckland v New Zealand Māori ====
Leatherbarrow capped his season by being selected for Auckland to play against New Zealand Māori on 9 October at Carlaw Park. The Māori side was essentially an Auckland Māori side though George Nēpia travelled up from Gisborne to play in the match. The Māori side won 43 to 21. The Auckland forwards were said to have been better than their backs and “Leatherbarrow took the hooking honours in a game where possession counts for everything”. His propping partners were Bill Breed and Hugh Donald, while his hooking opponent was Jack McLeod who had represented New Zealand earlier in the season.

=== Mount Albert, NZ Trial, Auckland (1938) ===
The 1938 season saw Leatherbarrow play 20 games for Mount Albert along with another trial game for New Zealand, and a representative match for Auckland. He also played his first ever game for Auckland Pākehā against Auckland Māori.

His first game of the season was a preseason match against Richmond which they won 24–15. For their opening Fox Memorial championship game of the season he was part of a very experienced forward pack which included himself at hooker, Richard (Dick) Shadbolt and Des Herring as props, Joseph Dunning and Jack Tristram in the second row and Martin Hansen at lock.

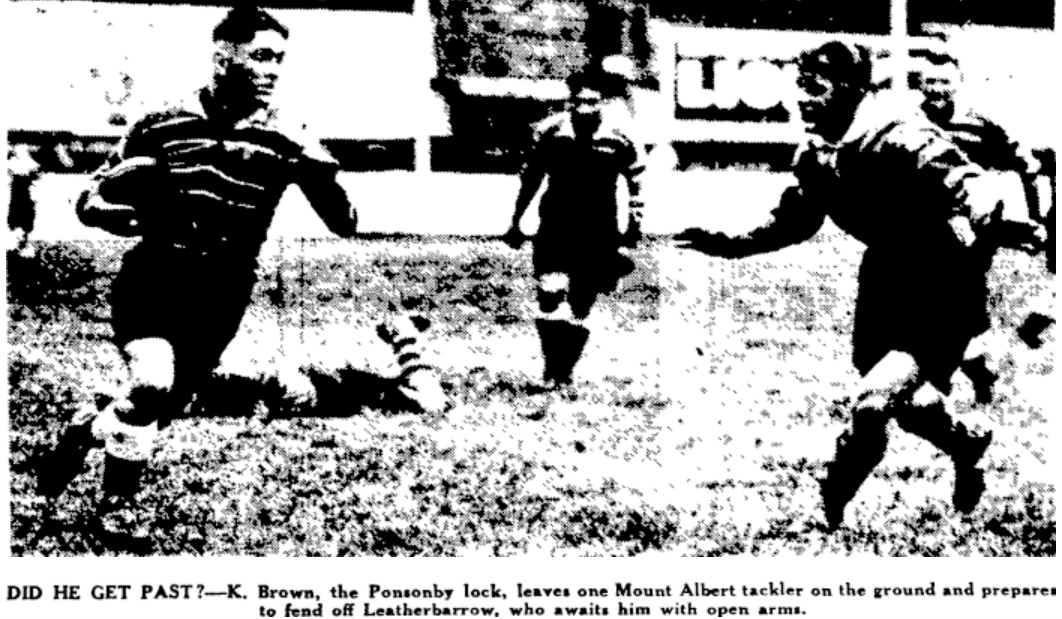
Leatherbarrow coming across to tackle K. Brown of Ponsonby.

Mount Albert won 18–16 with a photograph of him coming in for a tackle on Ponsonby lock, K. Brown appearing in the Auckland Star. In round 2 he scored two tries in a 25–18 win over Newton. For the first he was sent over by Hansen and the two of them along with Gunning “played good games”. He played in a loss to North Shore on 23 April, before kicking a conversion in a 18–13 win against Marist. A loss then followed against Manukau in round 5 before Leatherbarrow was selected in a New Zealand trial match.

He was named at hooker for the Probables though this appears to have been a misprint and it was the Possibles side. Leatherbarrow’s prop partners were Bill McNeight and Bill Breed. They were up against a front row of Alf Broadhead, N. Brown, and Arthur Sowter. The match was the curtain-raiser to the North Island v South Island inter-island match at Carlaw Park on 21 May. Leatherbarrow’s Possibles side won 25–21 with “good hooking by Leatherbarrow [giving] the Possibles a decided advantage, and its backs scored 19 points before the Probables opened its score. In the second half the selectors decided to swap the forwards over so that the Probables backs might secure more ball and “again Leatherbarrow got possession”. He scored two of the tries in the second half for the Probables.

Mount Albert were well beaten by Richmond in round 7 by 29 points to 7 though “Leatherbarrow hooked well, but J. Satherley also got a good share of the ball for Richmond”. The Auckland Star wrote that there was “a duel all day long for possession between Leatherbarrow and Satherley”. In a 29–10 win against City on 4 June he had to leave the field in the first half with an injury along with former New Zealand winger, Ted Mincham.

==== Auckland Pākehā ====
In early June Leatherbarrows was named to make his first ever appearance for Auckland Pākehā. With the growth of Māori rugby league players in the senior Auckland sides during the 1930s the Auckland Rugby League had begun to schedule representative matches between Pākehā and Māori sides. He was named at hooker with his Mount Albert team mates Broadhead and Shadbolt propping either side. The Māori side won 26 to 21 with Leatherbarrow scoring a try for the losing side. His try came after back, Phil Donovan, “made a good opening and the ball went to Gunning, Morgan and Leatherbarrow, the last named scoring for Mincham to convert”. The New Zealand Herald wrote that he, along with loose forwards Joseph Gunning, Edgar Morgan, and Clarrie Peterson “were the pick of the forwards”.

The following Saturday Leatherbarrow returned to his Mount Albert side and scored two tries and kicked a conversion in a 27–0 win over Papakura. He scored the best try of the match when Black took a kick, “and ran strongly before transferring to [Claude] List, who sent to Shadbolt, and Leatherbarrow took the final pass for a great try”. He was given the final conversion attempt of the game following Hansen’s try. Then in a 10–8 win against Ponsonby he was involved in a passing movement leading to Frederick List’s try. Leatherbarrow scored another try when Mount Albert beat Newton in round 11 on 25 June. It came after a “nice movement on the blind side by Wilson resulted in a good try by Leatherbarrow”. He was said to have “played a good game” with Hansen, Shadbolt and Tristram. While the Auckland Star said Leatherbarrow, Hansen and Tristram “were always to the fore in the Mount Albert play”.

His try scoring run continued with two more tries in their 9–3 win against North Shore in the main match at Carlaw Park on 2 July. His first try came after Joseph Gunning had led the forwards and Leatherbarrow scored, then later in the half he scored “after evading a flying tackle by Ted Scott”. It was said that he was “prominent and did a lot of good work in assisting the hooker” indicating that he had played at prop. He, Gunning and Hansen “were a fine trio who showed good anticipation, and kept up with the play”. Prior to their next game against fellow table topping Marist on 9 July the Herald wrote that “Mount Albert has a fine hooker in Leatherbarrow and he should serve his team well in this department”. Marist won 14–8 in a crucial match and would go on several weeks later to win the championship narrowly over Mount Albert.

==== Auckland selection v New Zealand ====
On 11 July Leatherbarrow was named to play for Auckland against the touring New Zealand which had just arrived back from Australia. He was chosen at hooker and it was said he was “likely to gain his share of the ball from the scrums”. His propping partners were Alf Broadhead and Mount Albert team mate Richard Shadbolt while he was opposed by George Orman at hooker in the New Zealand side, with props Joe Cootes and Bill McNeight. It was said that “Orman, the South Island player, who has a big reputation as a hooker, will contest ball possession in the scrums with Leatherbarrow, the Mount Albert forward, and on recent form the latter should be capable of giving Auckland quite a fair share of the ball from set positions”. Auckland won the match 21 to 16 before a crowd of 15,000 at Carlaw Park on 16 July. The Herald wrote that “Leatherbarrow was in good form in hooking and gave his team plenty of the ball”.

The following weekend Mount Albert beat Richmond 11–3 and “Leatherbarrow was the best of the hookers and gave his team a good share of the ball”. Following a 31–5 loss to Manukau on 6 August Leatherbarrow was named in the reserves for the Auckland side to play Canterbury on 13 August. Ultimately he was not required and the Auckland side was made up exclusively of Richmond and Manukau players who did not have a club game on that day. Meanwhile Leatherbarrow turned out for Mount Albert in a 28–13 win against City and scored a try and converted a try. He was involved in a good forward passing movement for Jack Tristram’s try and his own try came when Charlie Renton passed to Des Herring who then sent Leatherbarrow over for a try. Their final championship match was a 44–12 victory against Papakura with Leatherbarrow scoring two of their nine tries and being “always prominent”.

In Round 1 of the Roope Rooster knockout competition Mount Albert lost 6–2 to City. Leatherbarrow “worked hard” with the other forwards. In comments during the week it was said that Leatherbarrow was “probably the most efficient centre-forward in Auckland”. Mount Albert beat Marist 6–5 in Round 1 of the Phelan Shield knockout competition on 10 September before being knocked out in Round 2 by Manukau 26 to 17. Leatherbarrow scored a try for the losers and he and Herring “were the pick of the forwards” for Mount Albert. The try meant that he finished the season with 11 tries in official senior club matches which saw him as the leading try scorer in Auckland. This was a unique feat for a forward, particularly a hooker who had to spend a lot of time in the middle of the scrums.

=== Mount Albert (1939) ===
1939 was to be the most important of Leatherbarrow’s long career when he was finally selected to play for New Zealand after having made his senior debut 8 years earlier in 1931. He played 13 games for Mount Albert, scoring six tries. He scored two tries in the New Zealand trial match and also played in a representative match for Auckland Pākehā. Leatherbarrow was then selected to tour England with the New Zealand side. The senior side was being coached by former New Zealand standoff Stan Prentice with former New Zealand player Tom Haddon selecting the team.

His first club game of the season was for his Mount Albert side against Papakura on 1 April in Round 1 of the Fox Memorial championship. They won 24 to 10 at Carlaw Park on the main field in the early game. They next played a midweek game on 12 April against the touring Sydney XIII side. The team was predominantly made up of Balmain (5) and Eastern Suburbs (7) players but included others from Western Suburbs (2), North Sydney (1), Canterbury-Bankstown (1), and South Sydney (1). In a preview of the game the New Zealand Herald wrote that “Leatherbarrow is a successful hooker and should assure the Mount Albert backs of a good share of the ball”. Leatherbarrow was hooking against George Watt from the Balmain club. The Sydney side had a busy schedule playing Marist on Saturday the 8th, Richmond on the following Monday, then Mount Albert on the Wednesday. Mount Albert won the match 16 to 11. At one point in the first half Bruce Donaldson opened up play and passed to Martin Hansen, “but with an open goal Leatherbarrow dropped the ball”. Fortunately Des Herring was nearby and scored. In the second half Wilson “raced to the visitors twenty-five, but his pass to Leatherbarrow was forward and an easy try was missed”. His first try of the season came in their round 2 win over Newton on 15 April. Then in a round 3, 9–0 win over Richmond he “took in hooking honours”.

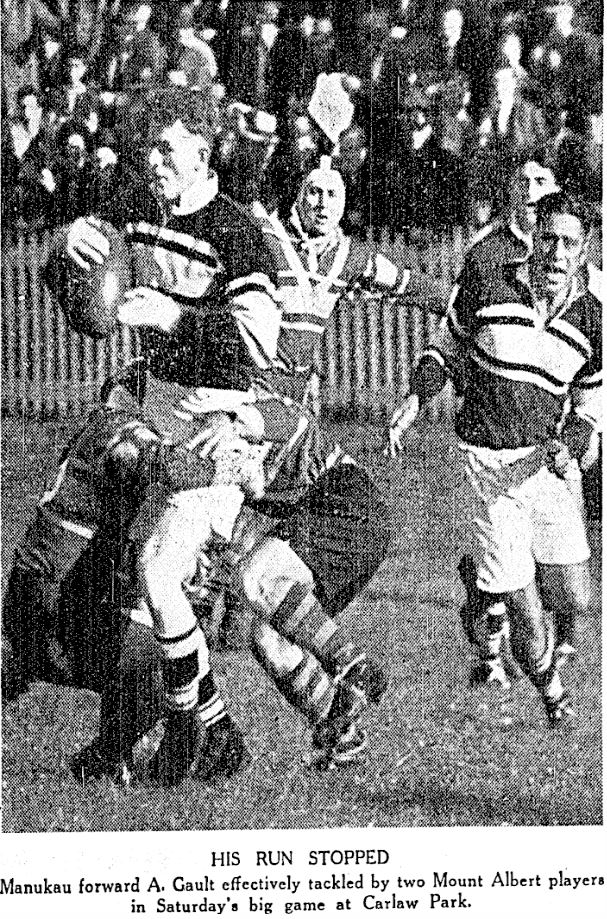
Bert Leatherbarrow in the background for Mount Albert. The tackled player is New Zealand representative Angus Gault

. On 6 May he scored another try when Mount Albert beat Manukau by 38 to 15. Against Marist in the next round it was reported that he moved back into the hooking position for the second half where he replaced Ernie Pinches who had been playing there. This “saw the advantage of possession swing definitely in favour of Mount Albert”. Leatherbarrow scored another try in their loss to North Shore on 20 May before a large crowd in the main match at Carlaw Park. With the representative season approaching and the tour of England by a New Zealand looming the New Zealand Herald published a list of in form players and had a suggested Auckland side with Leatherbarrow at hooker. He was subsequently named in the Auckland Pākehā team to play Auckland Māori on 3 June. The Auckland Star said that “Leatherbarrow, in addition to being a good forward in the loose, has been Auckland’s outstanding hooker this year”. Of the forwards, four out of the six were Mount Albert team mates including the entire front row.

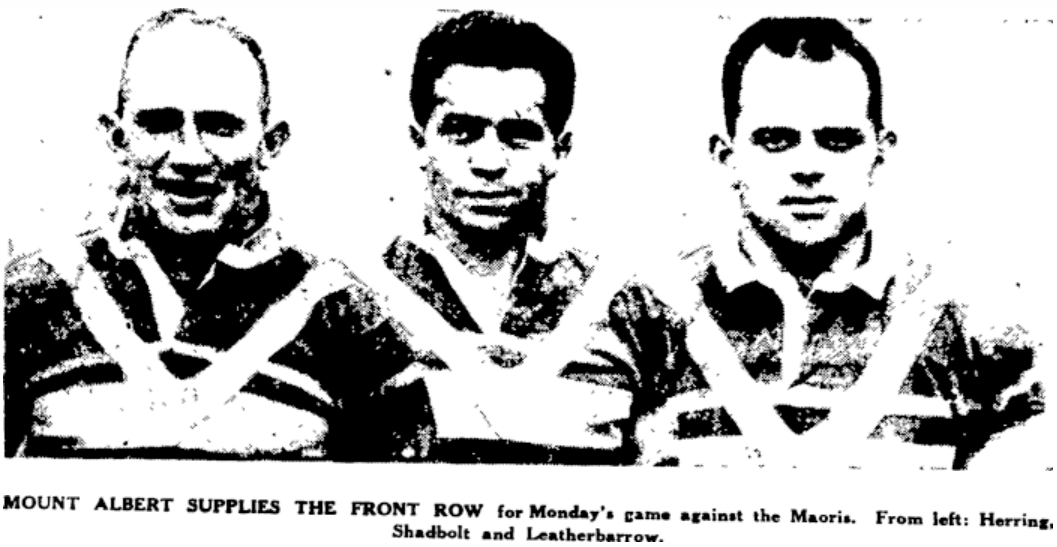
Leatherbarrow with his front row team mates Des Herring and Richard Shadbolt.

In Round 8 Leatherbarrow scored a try and kicked a conversion when Mount Albert beat City 18–7. He supported Joseph Gunning well along with Hansen and Cameron. The Auckland Star published a photograph of Leatherbarrow with his fellow Mount Albert front rowers, Des Herring and Martin Hansen who had been named in the Auckland Pākehā side. Leatherbarrow scored another try in Mount Albert’s easy 42–13 win over Ponsonby the following weekend. The Mount Albert forwards all played very well with Shadbolt, Herring and Leatherbarrow playing “splendid games”.

==== Auckland Pākehā v Auckland Māori ====
Before the Auckland Pākehā match with Auckland Māori on 5 June the New Zealand Herald wrote on the various positional selections and said that [Huck] “Flanagan, Ponsonby, is a cleaner hooker than Leatherbarrow, but the latter has an advantage in weight, and this no doubt influenced the selectors”. Leatherbarrow was matched up to S. Hapeta from the North Shore club. The Māori side won a close match 19–15. In the dying stages the Pākehā side “made a great effort to pull the game out of the fire, and Herring, Gunning and Leatherbarrow were associated in a thrilling passing bout, which [George] Nēpia stopped on the goal line”. After the match the Herald suggested that Leatherbarrow had “claims for selection” in further representative teams. Leatherbarrow then returned to his Mount Albert side though following a win over Papakura he was unavailable to play against Newton and as a result their opponents “received more than a fair share of the ball” from the scrums and won the game 21–7. He was available two weeks later for Mount Albert’s 11–6 win against Richmond and played well.

=== New Zealand Trials and selection (1939) ===
==== Trial (1939) ====
In early July Leatherbarrow was named in the New Zealand Probables side to play the Possibles. The match was curtain-raiser to the annual inter-island match between North Island and South Island on 8 July at Carlaw Park. Jim Brooks of the South Auckland (Waikato) team had been named at hooked for the North Island. In the Probables side the props in support of Leatherbarrow were current New Zealand forward Joe Cootes and Joseph Gunning from his Mount Albert side. The Probables side won 31 to 17 with Leatherbarrow scoring two of their seven tries. In the first half “Leatherbarrow was getting most of the ball from the scrum… and the Probables were attacking strongly with passing bouts”. Later in the half Shaw and Tommy Chase started a brilliant movement “which ended in Leatherbarrow running round to score behind the posts”. In the second half “Marshall, Barnard, Peterson and Leatherbarrow swept upfield in a bright passing bout, the last named scoring”. After the game the Herald said that Gunning was outstanding in the forwards and was well supported by Peterson, Leatherbarrow and Cootes. A second trial was held three days later on 11 July with new players given a chance and Leatherbarrow named in the reserves.

==== New Zealand selection ====
Following the second trial the New Zealand selectors, Jack Redwood, Scotty McClymont, and Jim Amos named the New Zealand side to tour England. Leatherbarrow was chosen as one of two hookers along with George Orman from the West Coast. The Auckland Star in comments on the selections said that “Leatherbarrow, in addition to being a good hooker, is a speedy player in the loose”. The New Zealand Herald was more critical of his selection saying “the inclusion of Leatherbarrow, Auckland, comes as a surprise. Leatherbarrow was outclassed by [Maurice] Quirke in the Possibles and Probables game and, throughout the season both Quirke, Newton, and [Huck] Flanagan, Ponsonby have continuously beaten the New Zealand representative for possession. The hooker is a specialist, particularly in England, where this position is vital in forward play. It was surprising that Quirke was not given a further trial on Tuesday against J. Brooks of Waikato, who was the North Island hooker against Orman. Leatherbarrow, however has been a prolific scorer in club and representative games”. The Gisborne Herald published a piece in the weight, height, and occupation of each player in the New Zealand touring side and Leatherbarrow was listed as being 5 foot 8.5 inches, 12 stone 6 pounds, and a mechanic. The tour would see the team nicknamed the “Kiwis” for the first time in their history.

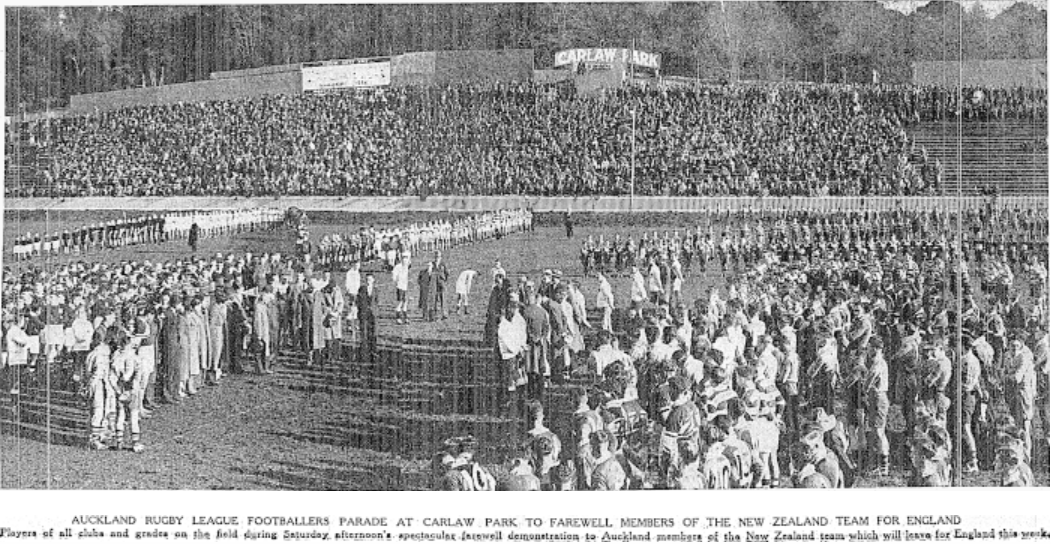
Bert Leatherbarrow and fellow Auckland members of the New Zealand team being farewelled at Carlaw Park on 22 July.

Before leaving for the tour the Auckland club players played in two more club rounds. Mount Albert were in first position in the championship and on 15 July Leatherbarrow scored a try in a 21–19 win over Manukau. It came after George Nēpia had scored an early try for Manukau. Then “Mount Albert evened the scores, after a very fine passing movement, in which Leatherbarrow changed his direction smartly and used his pace to improve the position”. With Mount Albert close to securing their first ever Fox Memorial first grade championship they “took no risks, and its three New Zealand representatives, Bob Banham, Leatherbarrow, and Arthur McInnarney, turned out to assist the team”. North Shore who were in second place left their four New Zealand representatives on the sideline and lost to Newton which all but sealed the championship for Mount Albert who beat Marist 24–15.

==== New Zealand tour of England and France ====
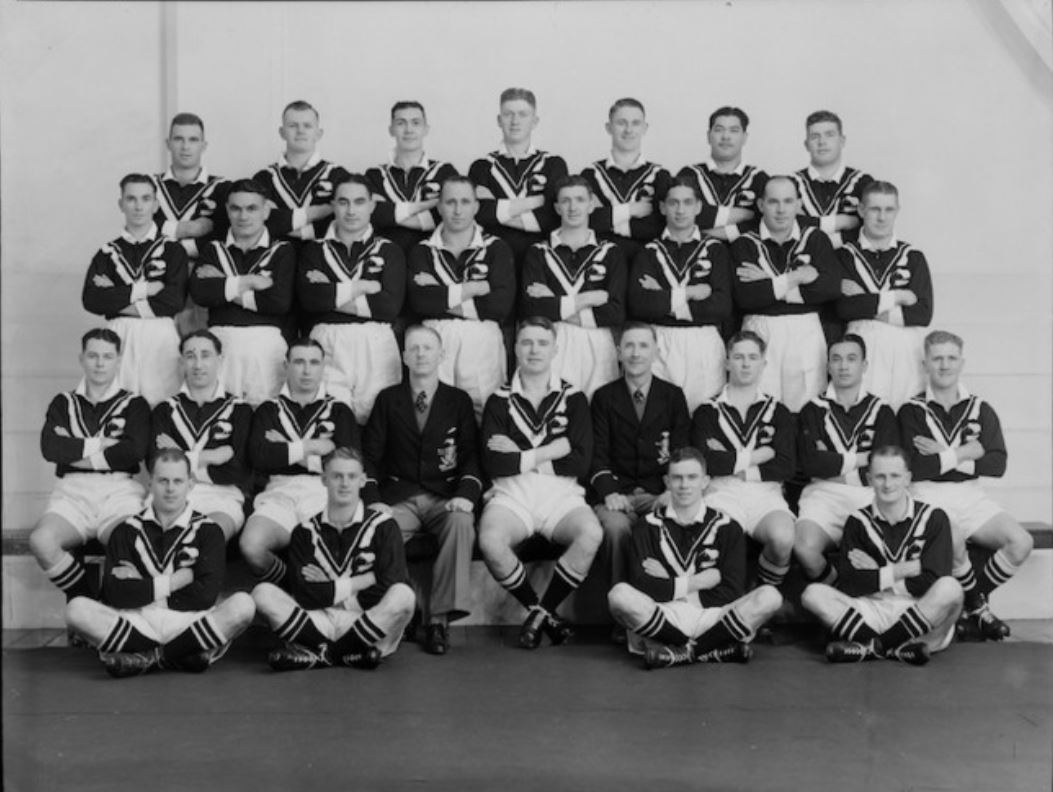
The New Zealand team to tour England in 1939–40.

The Auckland members of the side got the Express train to Wellington on 26 July. There was a photograph of Jones embracing somebody, possibly his mother, at their farewell from Auckland in the Auckland Star on 27 July. On the morning of the 27th the team and management attended a morning tea in the Parliament Buildings with "good wishes extended to the Kiwis, by Deputy-Prime Minister, the Hon. P, Fraser, who expressed hope that they would have a successful tour".

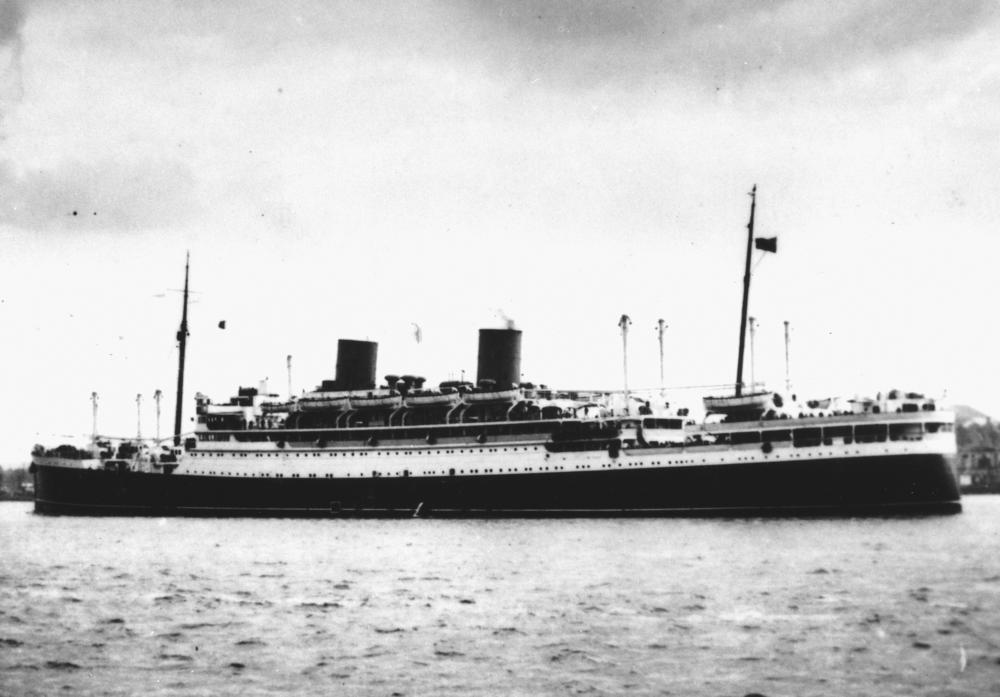
StateLibQld 1 170635 Rangitiki (ship)

The team departed Wellington for London on board the RMS Rangitiki in Tourist Class on Friday 28 July.

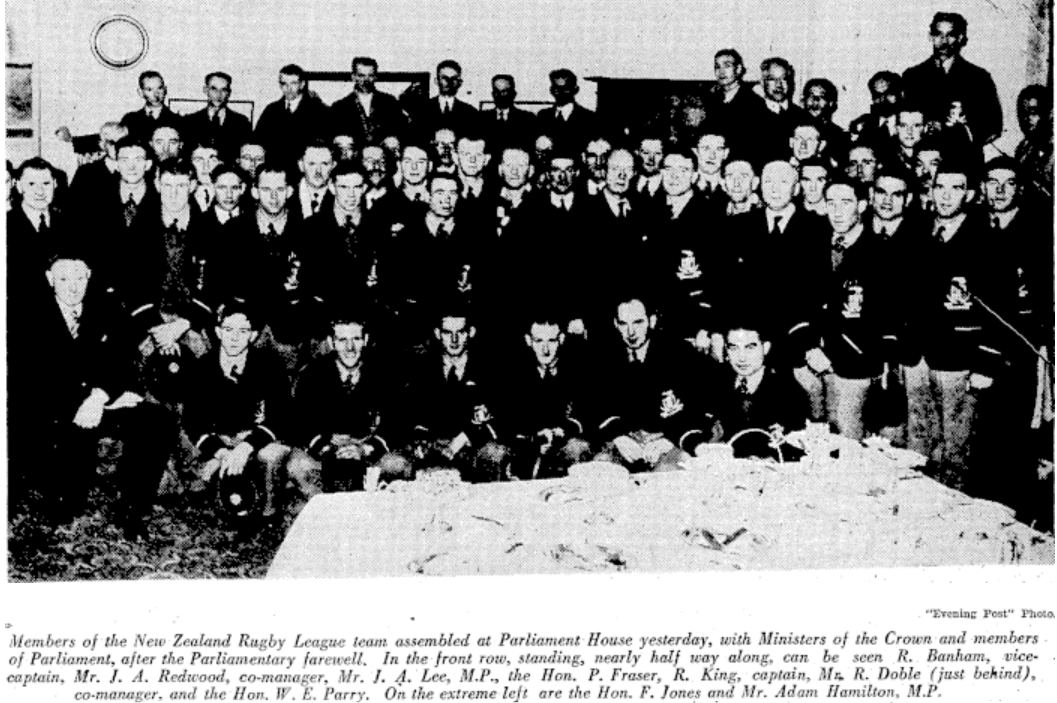
The New Zealand team at a farewell function held in the Parliament Buildings.

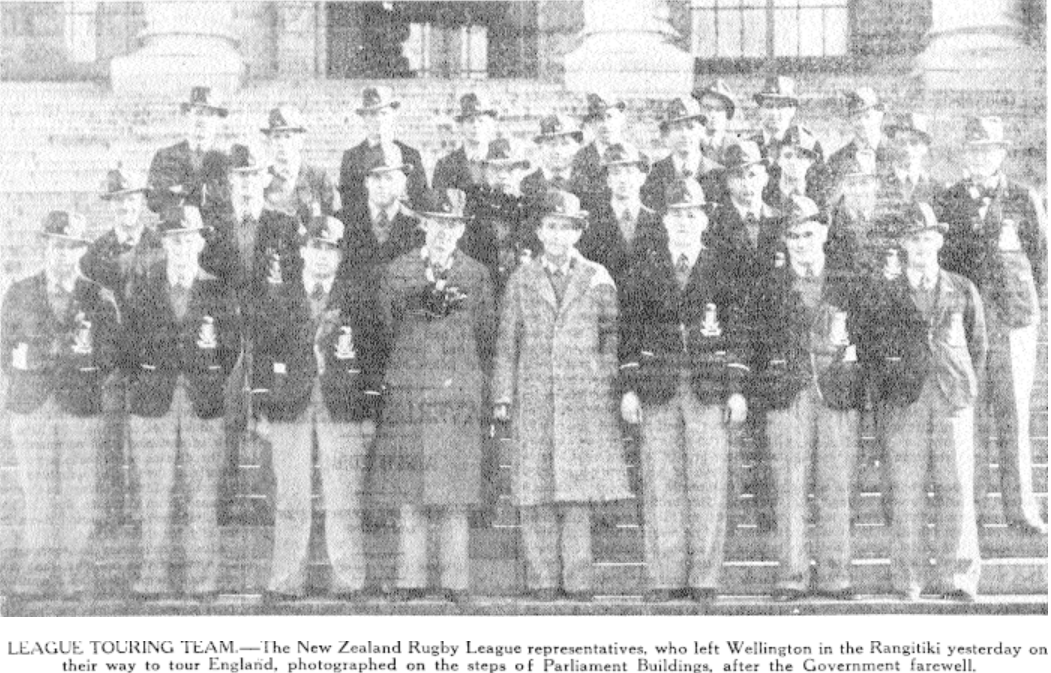
The New Zealand side on the steps of Parliament following their farewell function.

It was intended for the tour to consist of 23 matches in England including three tests and then six or seven matches in France however the tour was to be cut very short due the outbreak of World War 2. The first match of the tour was against St Helens on 2 September with George Orman named at hooker. New Zealand won 19 points to 3 at Knowsley Road before 4,000 spectators. A day later, on 3 September Britain declared war on Germany which effectively ended the tour. The second match against Hull Kingston Rovers scheduled for 7 September was cancelled as arrangements were hurriedly made to get the New Zealand side home.

In a letter from managers Jack Redwood and R. Doble they said after war broke out the team had to stay at Beechwood House, Harrogate in the north of England "under the insistence of the English authorities. The players went on A.R.P. (Air Raid Precaution) work, filling and stacking sandbags, and had agreed to keep together under the circumstances". The team was said to have "experienced one air-raid scare at Harrogate" in Yorkshire. They later moved to a different city and the letter concluded "we hope to see you soon. The boys are disappointed at the turn in events, but are happy and well". The team managed to organise to play Dewsbury on 9 September just prior to their departure. Leatherbarrow was chosen at hooker to make his one and only appearance for New Zealand. His props were George Beadle and George Bellaney. The tourists won 22–10 at Crown Flatt (Dewsbury) before a crowd of 6,200. Leatherbarrow scored one of New Zealand’s four tries. It was the final try and the Yorkshire Post and Leeds Intelligencer wrote that “Leatherbarrow, the hooker, who completed an attack in which the tourists’ forwards showed handling enterprise and running strength”. The team then returned to New Zealand on board the same liner which took them to England, the RMS Rangitiki. Following the teams return Jack Redwood said "English critics were greatly impressed by the playing strength of the New Zealand forwards, and two outstanding players were Jones and Milliken".

After his return the Mount Albert club celebrated their championship success. On 26 October a dinner was held for the returning players from the tour, arranged by the Auckland Rugby League ladies’ committee. It took place at the Station Hotel and Mrs. W. Leatherbarrow was one of the “ladies present”.

=== Mount Albert (1940) ===
In 1940 Leatherbarrow began his tenth season of senior rugby league. He played 22 games for Mount Albert, scoring 15 tries and kicking 10 goals. His try tally was the highest in the senior competition matches which was quite a feat for a hooker at this time. His first game of the season was in a preliminary round match against Newton which Mount Albert won 23–9 on Carlaw Park 2. He scored one of their five tries. He scored another try in a 16–10 loss to North Shore in Round 1 of the Fox Memorial Shield competition. He was among the most prominent of their forwards along with Richard Shadbolt, Jack Tristram, and Joseph Gunning. Next week in a loss to Manukau he was “always grafting hard” with Gunning and Tristram. The defending champions suffered another defeat to City in Round 4 (13–6) with Leatherbarrow and Tristram “showing up” in the forwards with Gunning and Blutcher.

==== Auckland Pākehā v Auckland Māori ====
In a win against Marist the following weekend he “raked with great success and also showed up in the loose”. They then played in the main match on the number 1 field at Carlaw Park against Newton in Round 6. “Leatherbarrow was getting the ball consistently in the first half, which gave Mount Albert a slight advantage over its opponents, but Newton fought back gamely” and went on to beat Mount Albert 8–6.

Leatherbarrow was then selected for the Auckland Pākehā side for the third time. He was chosen at hooker with Hermes Hadley and Bill Breed his propping partners while the hooker for Auckland Māori was W. Mataira. The NZ Herald wrote that “Leatherbarrow has been hooking consistently well this season and will see that his backs get plenty of opportunities to reveal their pace and skill”. In the 8 June match the Pākehā side won 10 points to 7 before a crowd of 6,000 to become the first holder of the James Carlaw Memorial Trophy.

Returning to his Mount Albert side he scored a try and “played a fine game” in a 24–11 win against Richmond before 7,000 spectators. The round 8 match between Mount Albert and Ponsonby saw Leatherbarrow at the centre of attention. Mount Albert won 27–19 with Leatherbarrow scoring two of their five tries with their being “much interest … in the hooking duel between Flanagan, the Ponsonby champion, and Leatherbarrow, the Mount Albert rake and New Zealand representative. There are those who will argue that one man is better than the other, and on Saturday those who lean in favour of Flanagan must have had slightly the better of the argument”. The referee, experienced Stuart Billman was said to have “kept a watchful eye on the hookers” which meant the scrummaging was good from both sides. Leatherbarrow was penalised for lifting more so than his opposite however. The Auckland Star added that “in view of these setbacks Leatherbarrow must have had a great deal of satisfaction in notching two tries, tries which were well merited and topped off a sterling all round performance”. The Herald wrote that “the referee [Billman] had considerable difficulty with the rival hookers… many free kicks were given against the pair for scrum breaches”, though remarked that “Leatherbarrow played a fine game”.

Two rounds later on 6 July Leatherbarrow scored once more in a 17–7 win over North Shore with a crowd of 7,500 in attendance at Carlaw Park. Prior to the game the Auckland Star wrote “with players of the calibre of Shadbolt, Leatherbarrow, Gunning and Flowers, they have one of the best packs in Auckland…”. Their forward pack did indeed play well with Mount Albert “getting a greater share of the ball as a result of Leatherbarrow’s consistent hooking”. Mount Albert then beat Manukau 19–5 with their half back, Les Clement being “well served by the hooker, Leatherbarrow” and was able to keep “his back line working methodically”. Leatherbarrow was also amongst the “hardest toilers in the forwards”. Leatherbarrow continued his try scoring run with another in a 24–7 win against City on 20 July. He “shone in the forwards” with Gunning and Herring. He hooked against A. Smith, who usually played in the three-quarters for City and as a result Mount Albert had a great advantage, though “it was not until midway through the second half that they “asserted its superiority”. Leatherbarrow “played well among the forwards”.

On 3 August he scored a try in his fourth consecutive game, and his ninth for the season in a 17–16 loss to Marist. The Marist hooker, Dobbyn, “was fully a match for Leatherbarrow at hooking” though Leatherbarrow “performed creditably”. In Round 17 Mount Albert easily beat Papakura 48 to 22 in a rare senior match at Mount Alberts home ground of Fowlds Park. There was no coverage of the match though using published season statistics for point scorers it was said that Leatherbarrow had 65 to this point from 15 tries and 10 goals meaning that he must have scored two tries and kicked six goals in Mount Alberts effort. They then beat Richmond 25–21 and he gave “splendid support” to Gunning who was outstanding. The result meant that Mount Albert finished the season in third place in the championship.

Mount Albert then had a 23–14 win in Round 2 of the Roope Rooster knockout competition on 14 September. Leatherbarrow scored two of their tries and kicked a conversion and was one of “the best of the forwards”. They were knocked out of the Roope Rooster by a 41–13 loss to Ponsonby with Leatherbarrow converting one of their three tries. The loss meant they moved into the consolation Phelan Shield knockout competition and Leatherbarrow scored all over their points in a 10–9 win over North Shore through two tries both of which he converted. The Auckland Star in a short piece on the game titled “Leatherbarrow’s Day” wrote “it was due to Leatherbarrow that Mount Albert defeated North Shore. The New Zealand representative hooker was in great form, raking cleanly in the set scrums, and showing pace and an eye for an opening in the loose. Twice in the game he gathered a pass close to the Shore goal line and shot over to score. And, better still, from the Mount Albert angle, he converted both tries, the second a goal giving Mount Albert a win by a single point”.

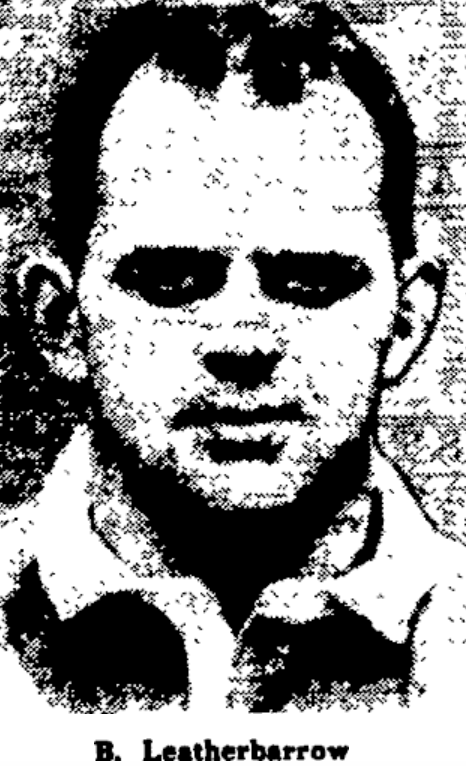

Before their final game of the season a portrait photograph was published in the Auckland Star. They lost their last match which was the final of the Phelan Shield on 12 October to Manukau by 20 points to 14. The New Zealand Herald wrote a tribute piece to Leatherbarrow who was said to be going to retire from playing. It said “After 24 years of football, Bert Leatherbarrow, of the Mount Albert team, played his final match. He has decided to retire. He made a start with football when seven years of age and was then goalkeeper for the North Shore fifth grade Soccer football team. In his school days at Devonport he played rugby, and he also played rugby in North Auckland and Taranaki. Then he played league in the North Shore junior grades. For several seasons he has been one of the outstanding forwards of the Mount Albert club and last season, for the first time, won Dominion honours, being selected to go with the New Zealand team to England. This season he got 65 points for Mount Albert, scoring 15 tries and kicking 10 goals. Apart from his value as a hooker, he has safe hands, and in loose play displayed speed and initiative. He always kept up with the play, with an eye for a pass, an opening and the goal-line ahead. He has in his time played in every position from the front row to full-back”. It is likely that the North Auckland and Taranaki rugby games were in his youth in the early 1920s.

=== Mount Albert (1941) and baseball ===
Despite the intentions of Leatherbarrow at the end of the 1940 season he came out of ‘retirement’ and began the 1941 season for Mount Albert. He ultimately played 21 games for them. Interestingly he failed to score a single try though he did kick 11 goals. He was also to make his last ever representative appearance during the season when he played twice for Auckland against South Auckland (Waikato). Prior to the start of the season Leatherbarrow played baseball which had been introduced to Auckland by American soldiers stationed in Auckland during the war. Leatherbarrow played for the Auckland representative side and on 1 February 1941 he played for them against the Auckland Under 21 representative side. In his Auckland team were Mount Albert rugby league team mates Basil Cranch and Joseph Gunning.

His first game was in a preliminary round match against City on 26 April. He kicked a penalty in a 5–5 draw. In their Fox Memorial championship opening round match he kicked two conversions in a 20–18 loss to Marist. He was “prominent” in the forwards. In a 29–15 loss to City in Round 2 he “did well among the forwards”. He then kicked a conversion in an 11–10 win against Papakura on Carlaw Park 2 on 24 May. He converted P. Caples try but missed the conversion of Arthur McInnarney’s try on full time. He was said to have “played well” with Shadbolt and Hucker. Mount Albert lost to Ponsonby 11–3 the following weekend despite having a “territorial advantage” early in the game with “Leatherbarrow hooking closely” and halfback Les Clement being able to send “the ball away sharply from the base of the scrum, and McInnarney penetrating sharply in the five eighths line…”

In Round 7 Mount Albert beat the league leaders Richmond by 13 points to 8. Leatherbarrow “hooked cleanly” for the winners and was “successful as hooker” according to the Herald. They lost to Manukau a week later 14–5. With the score 8–5 in the second half Leatherbarrow took a reverse pass and he raced for the line along with Jack Tristram but Manukau stopped the movement on the line and a try was lost. The Herald wrote that Leatherbarrow “was in great heart in the forwards”. Mount Albert were well beaten by North Shore in Round 9 by 30 to 8 with Leatherbarrow a “hard toiler” in the forwards with Claude List and Jack Tristram.

==== Auckland selection ====
Following the game with Manukau, Leatherbarrow was named in the Auckland team to play South Auckland (Waikato) side at Carlaw Park on 12 July. He was one of four New Zealand representatives named in the Auckland forwards along with George Mitchell, Pita Ririnui, and Hawea Mataira, though ultimately Ririnui was named in the reserves. It was Leatherbarrow’s first game for Auckland since the 1938 season. He was in his usual position of hooker with his props being Mount Albert team mate Richard (Dick) Shadbolt, and Leo Davis of the Richmond club. He was opposed by J Brooks in the South Auckland side. Before a crowd of 9,500 which included Acting Prime Minister, Walter Nash, the Auckland side won 25–14.

On 19 July he kicked a conversion in an 18–11 win against Marist on Carlaw Park 2. He had converted Hetherington’s try and “played a good game”. They lost to City 12–11 the following weekend and when trailing “the Mount Albert forwards rallied well in the concluding stages, and Leatherbarrow, Tristram and Shadbolt did fine work in an effort to pull the game out of the fire”. he converted two tries in an easy 38–18 win over Papakura in Round 12 on 2 August and was prominent in the forwards.

Mount Albert lost games to Newton, Ponsonby, and the North Shore in Rounds 13, 14, and 15. However Leatherbarrow’s individual form was good enough to see him selected for Auckland for their second and final match of the season. Their opponents were South Auckland (Waikato) once more, though this time the game was being played at Davies Park in Huntly on 6 September. His props were Vic Barchard and Leo Davis while the opposing hooker was D. Curnow. Before the game the Auckland Star wrote “the Auckland team is a strong one, and with A. Leatherbarrow, the New Zealand representative, hooking, the Auckland backs should get a fair share of the ball”. Auckland won the match 26 to 15 on a wet field after earlier heavy rain. The Auckland Star commented on Leatherbarrow’s opposite, Curnow, saying “the former Huntly District High School player “did very well considering that his hooking opponent was the New Zealand representative player, A. Leatherbarrow. Curnow is only 20 years of age, and is rather on the light side for big football…”.

Leatherbarrow was selected in the Auckland Pākehā team to play Auckland Māori on 20 September at Carlaw Park. However he didn’t actually play in the game and McIntosh was chosen as hooker. Instead on the same day Leatherbarrow played for Mount Albert in their Roope Rooster round 1 loss to Marist (10–6). He played well, at one point in the second half being involved in a break with Les Clement and Jack Tristram. He was “prominent among the forwards” and “did his work well as hooker, but the backs failed to press home this advantage”. In round 2 of the Phelan Shield he kicked three penalties in a 29–15 win over Newton where he also “ably led the attacks” with List and Tristram. In the semi final he kicked another penalty in their 21–12 win against North Shore. They then won the Phelan Shield final with a close 8–7 victory over Richmond. The match was curtain-raiser to the Stormont Shield playoff between Manukau and North Shore which saw a large crowd of 12,000. Leatherbarrow was said to have “played well” along with List in the forwards and the game was his final match of the season.

=== Mount Albert and Newton combined side (1942) ===
With World War 2 having an enormous effect on the senior playing numbers in Auckland the Auckland Rugby League decided to force several senior teams to merge. The City Rovers joined with Otahuhu Rovers, Marist Old Boys with North Shore Albions, and Mount Albert United with Newton Rangers. The move proved somewhat unpopular with some of the sides and ultimately only lasted for one season with the clubs reverting back to their own senior teams the following year. Prior to the merger the New Zealand Herald said that Leatherbarrow would be playing again for Mount Albert and would be part of “the nucleus of a good pack”.

Leatherbarrow did not play in any of the Newton-Mount Albert merged sides opening three matches. The Mount Albert club was essentially boycotting the composite side with none of their players participating, choosing instead to ‘stand down’. However prior to the 4th round the club decided to ‘bury the hatchet’ and “threw in their lot to amalgamate with Newton”. It was reported that Leatherbarrow, Claude List, and Basil Cranch of the Mount Albert club played in the 10–5 loss to Manukau on 30 May with others expected to join soon. There was relatively little newspaper coverage of the senior competition and Leatherbarrow was not mentioned again until a 16–10 win against the City-Otahuhu side in round 7 on 20 June. He was said to have been “prominent” with List and Josephs. He scored his only points of the season for them on 27 June when they beat Marist-North Shore 24–15 and he got one of their four tries. The side played another eight games through the remainder of the season but Leatherbarrow was not mentioned again. It is likely that he played in these games but most weeks only saw the point scorers mentioned and the side was typically only scoring in single figures each week.

=== Mount Albert, Rheumatism, and Transfer to City Rovers(1943) ===
The 1943 season saw Leatherbarrow change clubs for the third time in his career. The Mount Albert and Newton clubs had gone back to being separate at the senior level and he rejoined Mount Albert. However he stopped playing for them early in the season and then nearing the end of the season he joined the City Rovers. In a preliminary round match on 17 April he kicked four conversions in a 20–13 win over Marist. In round 1 of the Fox Memorial championship they lost to the same opponent 15–10 with Leatherbarrow kicking a penalty. In a 20–2 win against Ponsonby a week later he kicked two conversions, sharing the kicking duties with Basil Cranch, the older brother of future New Zealand representative Ray Cranch. Then in a 15–2 win over North Shore in Round 3 he scored a try and converted all three tries. The Auckland Star said “the veteran, Leatherbarrow, played splendidly in the loose…”. Mount Albert lost in Round 4 to Richmond 15–4 with Leatherbarrow kicking two penalties for all of their points.

Leatherbarrow then did not play in any of Mount Albert’s four matches on 29 May, 5, 12 and 19 June. A piece then appeared in the Auckland Star on his health regarding his work situation. The article was titled “Decision Reserved – Motor Mechanic’s Appeal” and read “stating that he suffered from rheumatism and might possibly become a physical wreck if he had to continue in his present employment, B. Leatherbarrow, motor mechanic admitted to the Auckland Manpower (Industrial) Committee today that he had been playing league football up till four or five weeks ago. The particular work which affected him was having to lie underneath cars. He was employed by Schofield and Company, Ltd. The manager of the company said that if the company allowed one man to go a landslide might take place. Leatherbarrow was a most capable mechanic and the company would try to avoid giving him the particular work he claimed aggravated his rheumatism. Decision was reserved”. In his absence Thomassen was hooking for Mount Albert.

==== Move to City ====
It appears that he missed another ten games for Mount Albert due to his physical condition but then on 2 October he turned out for the City Rovers club in the Stormont Shield final match with Manukau. Manukau won the game 12 points to 9 with the Auckland Star mentioning that Leatherbarrow and Hawea Mataira had played in the City forwards. They played against his old Mount Albert club a week later on 9 October in the Phelan Shield semi final though it is unknown if he took the field.

=== City and then retirement (1944) ===
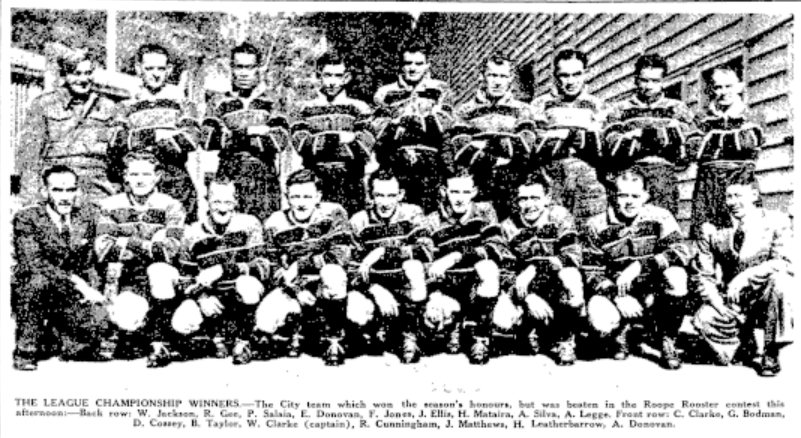
City Rovers, Fox Memorial champions of 1944

The 1944 season was to be the last for Leatherbarrow. He was 34 years of age at the start of the year and turned 35 before his final match in what was his fourteenth season in senior rugby league. He played 20 games for City and scored three tries.

As in recent years due to the War there was less coverage of sports in Auckland and there was no mention of Leatherbarrow until round 2 of the championship following City’s 9–7 win over Richmond. The Auckland Star wrote a short piece about the City forwards which said “the City team showed on Saturday that it can field a pack likely to hold any opposing six during the present season. In B. Leatherbarrow the club has a New Zealand representative hooker, with a great front-row support in H. Mataira, another New Zealand league representative…”. The Herald said that “Leatherbarrow hooked successfully”. They lost to Manukau 12–11 in Round 4. Manukau had recently gained the hooking services of Ken Finlayson from the Otahuhu club. He was the son of Charles Finlayson, former New Zealand representative at rugby league and cricket. Ken’s “clean hooking got Manukau the ball from set scrums on occasions which really counted, despite the fact that his opposite was B. Leatherbarrow, the New Zealand representative player”. Despite the fact that Leatherbarrow had not played for New Zealand in five years he was still the incumbent hooker as they had not played a game since the outbreak of the war.

His first try for City came in a 24–3 win against Newton at Grey Lynn Park on 27 May. The ground was the home of Richmond Rovers. With their being ten teams in the Fox Memorial championship necessitating five games per round, Carlaw Park was not able to accommodate all the matches and a game each week was played at a suburban ground. On 27 May in a 15–11 win over North Shore, the Auckland Star wrote “both teams were well served with specialist hookers, and on the day there was little between Leatherbarrow, for City, and [John] Rutherford, for North Shore”. He scored a second try when City beat Ponsonby 24–6 on Carlaw Park 2. The win meant that they retained the lead in the championship. He was well supported by W. Jackson and Hawea Mataira in the scrums, both being very large players.

Controversy struck the City club following their 13–12 loss to Richmond in Round 11. Eugene Donovan was sent off by referee George Kelly and following a try to Pouvi (Robert) Salaia. He had said to Leatherbarrow as they walked back to halfway that “if City’s tries are not clear cut this chap won’t allow them”. The referee heard the remark and said “any more of that and you will go off”. Donovan argued that he was talking to his team mate with the referee saying he didn’t care who it was too and when Donovan said he’d talk to his team mate anytime he wanted with Kelly then sending him off just ten minutes into the match. The City club then decided to refuse to play their next match against Manukau as the Auckland Rugby League demanded he apologise to the referee or his suspension would not be lifted. The City club was arguing that Donovan’s version of events was different to the referees and Kelly had not asked for an apology. The issue dragged on and City again defaulted their next match with Marist in Round 13. Ironically they won the round 14 match by default when the struggling Newton Rangers failed to field a team.

When City returned to the playing field in Round 15 they beat North Shore 15–10 with Leatherbarrow scoring one of their three tries. In a 20–10 win over Otahuhu he “did good work” with W. Jackson. Despite the fact that they had defaulted two matches they were still tied in first for the championship with Manukau and Mount Albert. In Round 18 Mount Albert beat Manukau 10–7 while City beat Ponsonby 14–8. The two results meant that City and Mount Albert were tied in first place on 24 championship points at the conclusion of the competition round robin so a final was needed to decide the champions. The final would of course be between City and Leatherbarrow’s old club Mount Albert. The Auckland Star mentioned that “both teams will be strong in the forwards. Prominent in the City pack this season have been H. Mataira and B. Leatherbarrow, the New Zealand representative players, and [Fred] James, the North Island representative.

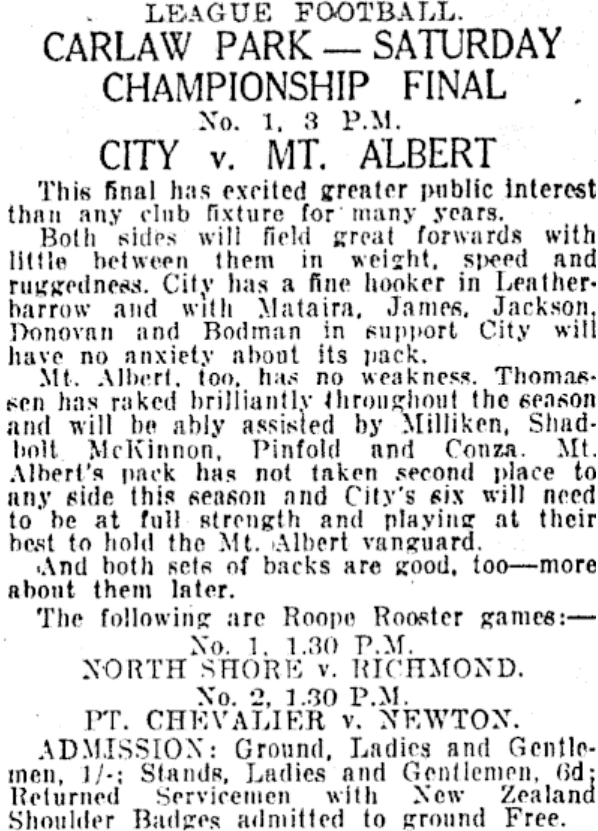
An advertisement for the final between City and Mount Albert.

In an advertisement for the final the Auckland Rugby League had written “both sides will field great forwards with little between them in weight, speed and ruggedness. City has a fine hooker in Leatherbarrow…” City won the match 17–7 “witnessed by one of the largest crowds this season” at Carlaw Park on 23 September. It was their eighth first grade title, but their first since 1925. It was the fourth time Leatherbarrow had been part of a championship winning team following Devonport/North Shore’s titles in 1932 and 1933, and Mount Albert’s in 1939. He was matched up with Thomassen of Mount Albert, the player who had replaced him at hooker the previous season when he had been unwell. The match report in the first half said that “City forwards were dominating the play, and from the set scrums Leatherbarrow was getting the ball cleanly, and giving [Alan] Donovan a wealth of chances to get the City backs going”. The New Zealand Herald said “Leatherbarrow win the ball from most set scrums, but bad handling by Cossey checked several promising movements”. It went on to say that “Mataira, Leatherbarrow and Jackson have no equal as a front-row combination”.

City were eliminated from the Roope Rooster knockout competition on 30 September when Ponsonby beat them 31-17. An article on the success of the City side credited much of it to the form of the front row trio of Mataira, Leatherbarrow and Jackson, describing them as "the best front row forwards (as a combination) in the league code today".

In Leatherbarrow’s final ever game City beat Ponsonby 15–11 on 21 October to claim the Stormont Shield title for the ‘champion of champions’. He retired from the game though in May of the 1945 it was rumoured that he might be available for City later in the season, however he did not make a return to the field.

== Personal life ==
In the 1931 Electoral Roll, Leatherbarrow was a mechanic living at 10 King Edward’s Parade in Devonport with his older brother Harry and his wife Daphne. His mother and sister were living in the same suburb at 21 Buchanan Street. Bert married Mary Margurite Keith (1913–1980) on Boxing Day, 1934. Mary was originally from Wellington though had moved to Auckland with her parents (Kenneth and Mary).

In 1941 his brother Harry was required to enter camp at Papakura in early July after a list of drafted men was published in the New Zealand Herald on 25 June. They were to report to the Drill Hall on Rutland Street at 7am on Saturday, 5 July with the name “H Leatherbarrow” appearing on the list. There was no mention of Leatherbarrow in any of the electoral rolls in Auckland from the late 1940s through until 1957 indicating that he was possibly out of Auckland for a time. In 1957 he was recorded in the electoral roll as living at 420 Main Highway, Panmure with his wife Mary. He was now working as a “carrier”. He and Mary continued to live at the same address through the late 1950s and 1960s. He continued to work as a carrier and a cartage contractor.

=== Death ===
Bert Leatherbarrow died on 18 July 1983 aged 73. His wife Mary had died three years earlier on 29 April 1980.
