= Ray Lawless (rugby league, born 1909) =

New Zealand rugby league footballer

Personal information
- Full name: Raymond Victor Lawless
- Born: 28 May 1909 Auckland, New Zealand
- Died: 3 June 1968 (aged 59) Papakura, Auckland, New Zealand

Playing information
- Weight: 11 st 7 lb (73 kg)

Rugby league
- Position: Second-row
Club
Years	Team	Pld	T	G	FG	P
1929–35	Richmond Rovers	82	26	0	0	78
1930	Marist XIII	1	0	0	0	0
1932	Ponsonby XIII	1	0	0	0	0
	Total	84	26	0	0	78
Representative
Years	Team	Pld	T	G	FG	P
1932–34	Auckland	10	4	0	0	12
1932–35	New Zealand	3	0	0	0	0
1932	New Zealand XIII	1	0	0	0	0
1932	Auckland XIII	1	0	0	0	0
1933–35	Auckland Trials	2	0	0	0	0
1935	Auckland Province	1	0	0	0	0

Rugby union
Club
Years	Team	Pld	T	G	FG	P
1937	Marist (Gisborne)	6	1	0	0	3
- As of 7 June 2021

Raymond Victor Lawless (28 May 1909 – 3 June 1968) was a rugby league player who represented New Zealand in 2 tests in 1932 and 1 test in 1935 against England and Australia respectively. In the process he became the 222nd New Zealand representative.

== Early life ==
Lawless was born on 28 May 1909 in Auckland. His parents were Marion Kate Lawless (nee Burchell), though she was more commonly known as Catherine, and Charles Cecil Lawless. Ray had 8 brothers and sisters. The family lived on Dryden Street in Grey Lynn.

== Playing career ==
=== Richmond Rovers ===
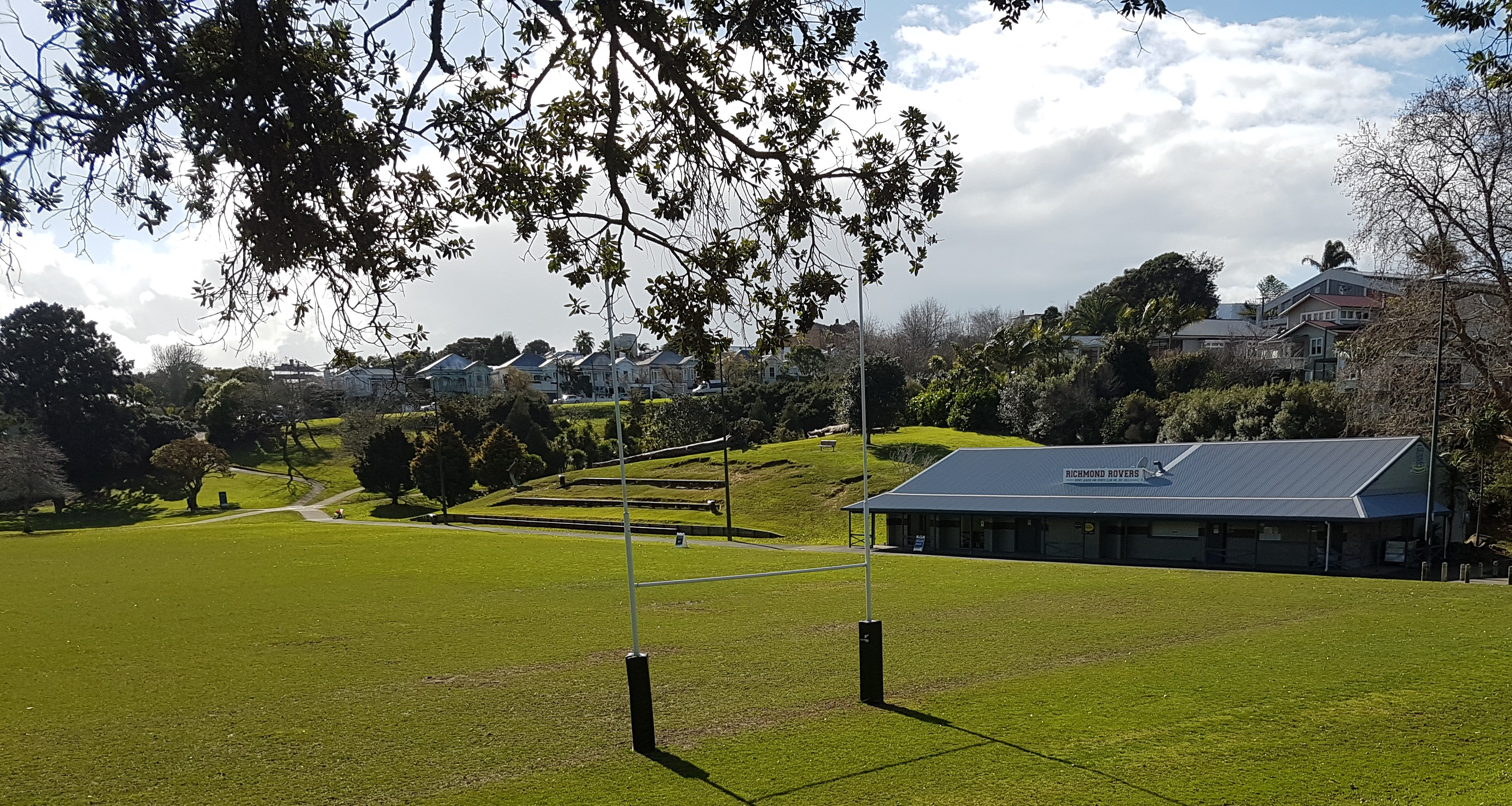
Grey Lynn Park, home of the Richmond Rovers RL club where Ray Lawless trained and played.

Lawless was playing second row for the Richmond senior B team in 1929 and 1930. His family house backed on to Grey Lynn Park in Grey Lynn which was the home of the Richmond Rovers club. The senior B competition received some publicity in the Auckland newspapers and in the Auckland Star following a game in May 1930 it was said that “Ragge and Lawless played splendidly for Richmond. This pair will develop into good forwards”.

In round 11 on 6 July of the 1929 season he made his senior debut in a loss to Ponsonby.

After a July match he was said to be “a tireless worker”. On 20 September he played for Otahuhu against Marist Old Boys in a benefit match at Sturges Park for W. McManus who had been ill for a long time in hospital. The Auckland Star reported “the best forwards on the ground were Lawless and Simpson. This pair is fit for any senior team”. While the New Zealand Herald wrote that “Lawless was perhaps the best forward on the ground. The Richmond representative should easily gain a place in senior football next season”.

He made his 1931 debut for the Richmond senior side on 2 May 1931 in a match at Carlaw Park against Marist Old Boys. His first try in the senior A grade came in round 2 against City Rovers in a 28–15 win. It was said to be a “sheer delight to witness the fine play of Lawless and Ritchie, forwards of exceptional calibre” and that he “stood out as the best forward on the ground. Similar comments were made regularly throughout his career. During a match against Ellerslie-Otahuhu on 23 May it was later reported that “Lawless, the Richmond rugby league forward who has been outstanding this season, received a nasty kick in the face… and may be laid aside for several weeks”. He was in superb form throughout his debut season and when the North Island team was named to play the South Island he was said to be unlucky to miss selection. In October he was selected to play for an Auckland Colts side to take on the touring Eastern Suburbs side however he was unavailable to play as the match was on a midweek afternoon. He finished the season having played 15 matches for Richmond, scoring 2 tries.

=== New Zealand selection ===
Lawless was in outstanding form for Richmond in the Fox Memorial competition. He had scored 3 tries through the first 9 rounds of the competition before being selected for an Auckland XIII to play South Auckland on 16 July. Lawless played in the second row alongside Trevor Hall with Alan Clarke at lock. Auckland won the match by 29-13 at Carlaw Park. He was then chosen to play for a Possibles team to play the Probables but was unable to due to injury.

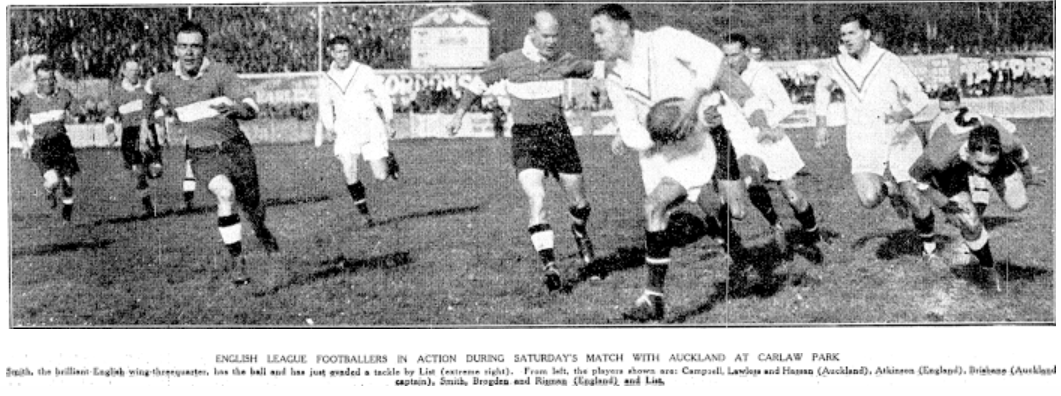

Lawless had recovered enough to be named for his debut in the Auckland team to play the touring England side. England won the match by the narrow margin of 19 to 14. Lawless was said to have played well and “stood out for good work, especially in the tight”.

He had impressed the New Zealand selectors enough to be named in the New Zealand side for the second test with England to be played at Monica Park in Christchurch. New Zealand had been defeated in the first test by 24 points to 9. The Herald reported that “Lawless had played fine club football all the season and in his first trial in higher football he was outstanding”. He was paired in the second row with Jim Calder. England won convincingly once again by 25 points to 14 before a crowd of 7,000. During the game Lawless tackled Martin Hodgson who “did not seem to like Lawless tackling him in some tight work, and there was an incident on the ground that led to hooting. The game was held up for a few moments while Lawless recovered. He was said to have played well along with Lou Hutt and Calder who “were the exceptions in the New Zealand team, playing in the vanguard throughout the game, stolidly indifferent to the battering from the Englishmen, and doing much to keep New Zealand’s score level until the whole side was worn out”. Lawless and Hutt “were the best at tackling” in the New Zealand side. Lawless was then chosen in a New Zealand XIII to play England at Wellington in a midweek fixture. England totally outclassed the New Zealand selection winning 59 to 8. Lawless was selected once more to play in the 3rd test at Carlaw Park. He was partnered with Jim Laird in the second row. New Zealand performed far better in the final test however they were still defeated 20 points to 18.

Lawless then returned to his Richmond side where they were defeated in a Roope Rooster match 21-14. He also played for them against Hamilton on 25 September, where he scored a try. Lawless finished the season having played 11 matches and scoring 4 tries. He was also chosen in a Ponsonby XIII who were travelling to New Plymouth to play an exhibition match against fellow Auckland side, Devonport United on 9 September. The match was played at Pukekura park and resulted in a 28–28 draw.

Lawless finished the season playing two representative matches. The first was for Auckland against Lower Waikato at Huntly on 2 October. Auckland won the match for the Sunshine Cup by 35 to 8. He then played in an Auckland XIII against Marist in a benefit match for W Hanlon. Hanlon was a former Richmond player who was trying to return home to New Zealand after playing there and falling on hard times.

=== Richmond and Auckland successes ===
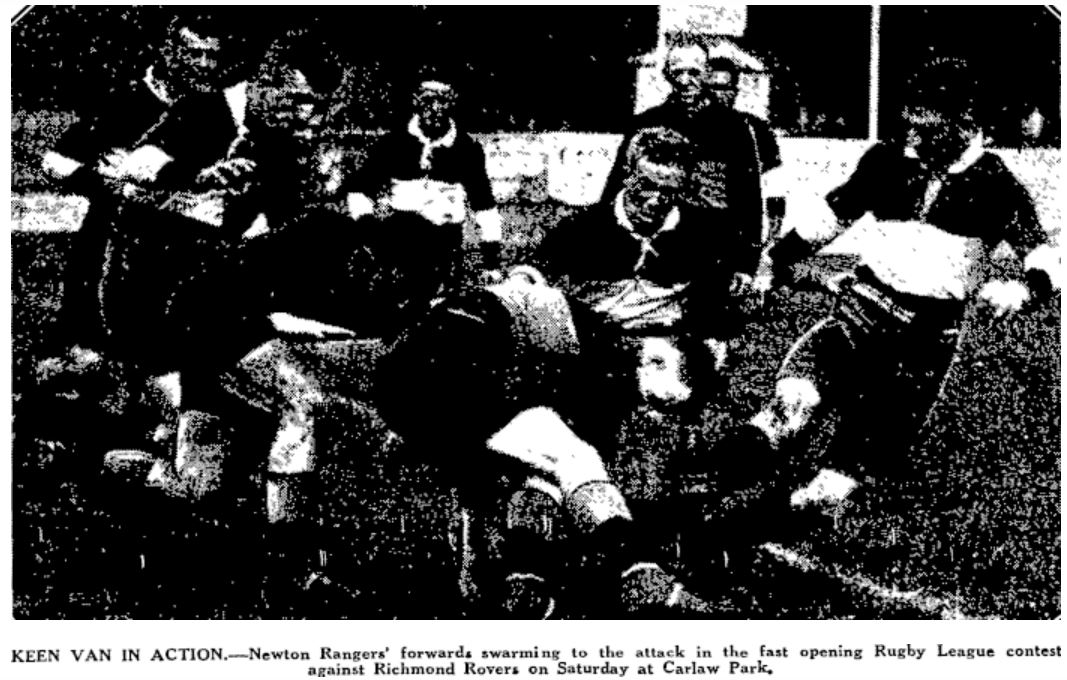
Lawless standing in the centre in Richmond's opening round 25-18 loss to Newton in 1933. He scored two of their four tries.

Lawless made 17 appearances for Richmond during the 1933 season and scored 7 tries. Six of those were in competition matches which meant he was the equal 6th highest try scorer in the senior A grade matches. He was consistently being mentioned in the newspapers as being one of the best forwards on the field in the club competitions. Richmond could only finish 5th in the Fox Memorial competition with 3 wins, 1 draw, and 6 losses however they showed better form later in the season. In the Roope Rooster they recorded wins over Newton Rangers, Marist Old Boys, and City Rovers to win the knockout competition. Lawless scored tries in the wins over Newton and Marist. Their win qualified them for the Stormont Shield champion of champions match with Devonport who had won the Fox Memorial title however Richmond lost 12–8.

The highlight of the season for Lawless and his Richmond side was their two wins over the touring St. George side from Sydney. They had finished runners up in the New South Wales competition a week prior to their first match in Auckland. On 27 September Richmond defeated them 13-8 at Carlaw Park. Lawless and Cliff Satherley were said to be “perhaps the best on the field. They played vigorously, and never gave their opponents a moment’s peace”. Then on 14 October Lawless was again a part of the Richmond side which beat St. George again by 5 points to 3.

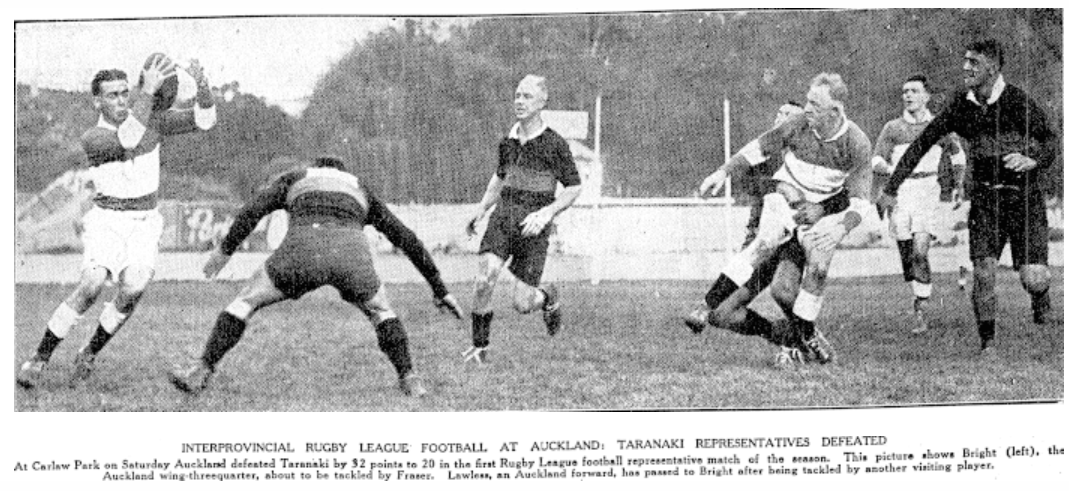

He played in 5 matches for Auckland and a trial match. His first appearance for Auckland was against Taranaki on 10 June. Before a crowd of 10,000 Auckland won 32–20 with Lawless and Laird the outstanding forwards. Though it was suggested that he “was found too often among the backs and failed to do his share as a forward”. On 15 July he played for an Auckland B team against Auckland A on the same day that Auckland were playing South Auckland. His team won 16 points to 9. Lawless next played for Auckland against North Auckland on 12 August. Auckland won 28 to 13 at Carlaw Park. On 26 August Lawless played for Auckland against West Coast with Auckland again victorious by 28 points to 22.

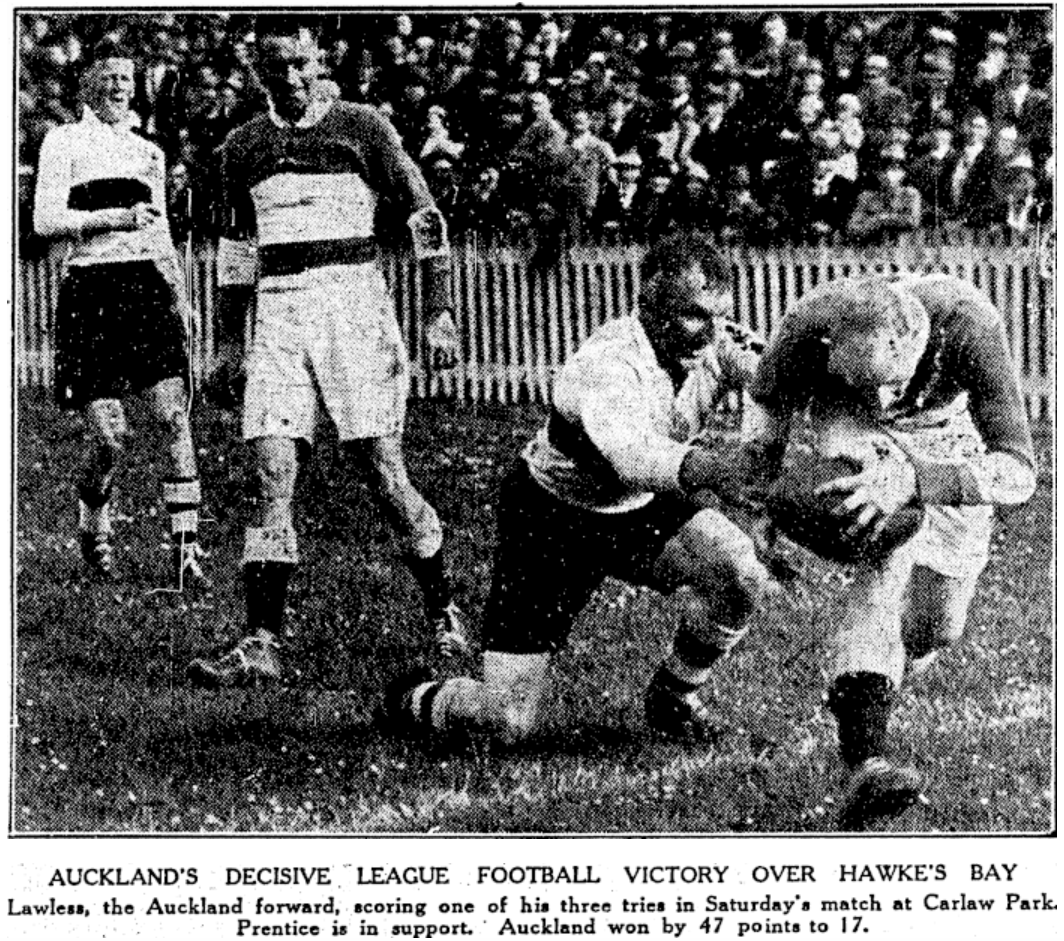

Lawless was in try scoring form on 2 September in Auckland’s match with Hawke’s Bay. Auckland won 47–17 with Lawless running in three tries on Carlaw Park. His first try was by the posts after persistent attacking while his second came after a “passing rush”. Late in the match the team was shuffled with Campbell going off injured and Bert Cooke moving to fullback with Lawless taking his place in the centres. He scored before fulltime with Donald converting. His final match for Auckland of the season was against South Auckland on 9 September. Auckland won by 17 points to 5. The 1934 season for Richmond was one of the most extraordinary in Auckland club rugby league history in terms of success on the field. They won the Fox Memorial title for winning the senior championship, the Roope Rooster knockout competition, the Stormont Shield champion of champions trophy and defeated the touring Western Suburbs twice.

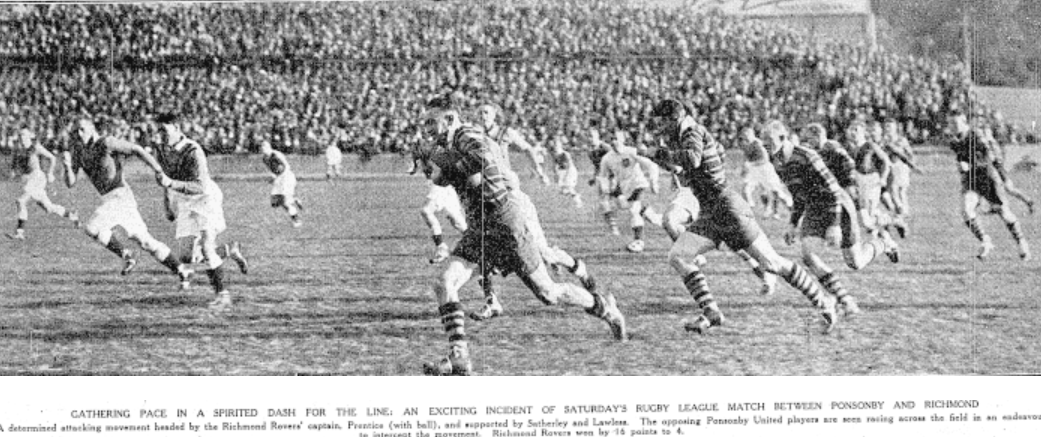
Lawless in support of Stan Prentice in a match for Richmond against Ponsonby on 12 May

Lawless played in 20 of their matches, scoring 9 tries. The only match he missed during the entire season was a round 7 match after he was suspended for “misconduct on the field” involving Kelsall of Newton Rangers in round 6 in a match. They stated “that they had no intention when leaving the ground to fight, Lawless merely pointing towards the side-door entrance of the grandstand as the best way of avoiding the crowd”. The 7 tries that Lawless scored during senior club competitions meant that he was once again amongst the leading try scorers. He scored 3 tries in their round 9 win over City Rovers. While in the 20-13 Roope Rooster final win over Marist Old Boys he again crossed the line.

He also made two appearances for Auckland during the season. The first was on 30 June, when Auckland took on Taranaki at Carlaw Park. Auckland won the match convincingly 35 to 8. It was said that he was “prominent in the open” along with Lou Hutt and that he and Satherley were “outstanding”. He then played for Auckland against South Auckland on 15 September with Auckland again victorious 35 to 16 with Lawless scoring a try. He was “always prominent” along with Jim Laird.

=== New Zealand selection again ===
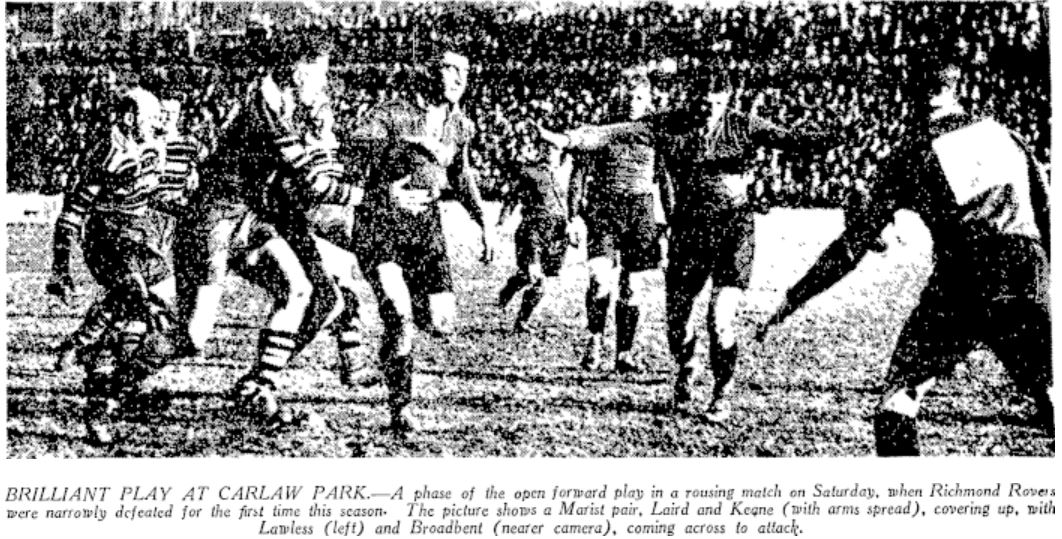
Lawless on the left coming across.

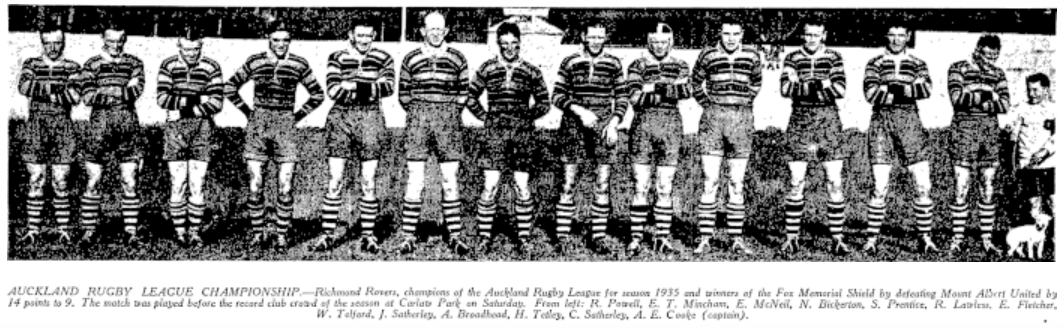

The 1935 season saw Lawless once again playing in a successful Richmond side. He made 17 appearances and scored 4 tries. They defended their Fox Memorial title and also won the Stormont Shield though they were defeated in the final of the Roope Rooster by Newton Rangers. One of his tries came in the Fox Memorial playoff for the final against Mount Albert which they won 14–9. Lawless was said to be “the best of the forwards”.

He was surprisingly left out of the North Island side to play the South Island on 17 August and was instead chosen to play in the Auckland B team against Auckland A. His side lost the match narrowly by 22 points to 19.

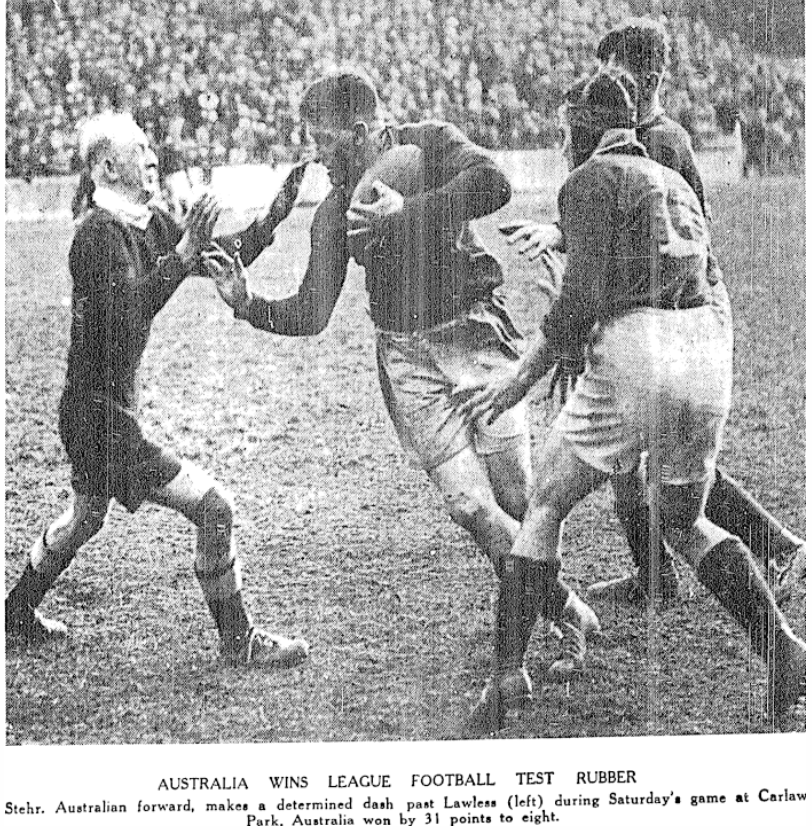

Lawless was not picked for any of the Auckland teams to play during the year, nor the North Island side however he was selected to play for New Zealand in the third test against Australia at Carlaw Park on 5 October. Before a crowd of 20,000 New Zealand was soundly beaten by 31 points to 8. He was played in the second row alongside Cliff Satherley. He was then picked to play for Auckland Province against Australia on 9 October. Australia won 36 to 18 once again on Carlaw Park.

=== Retirement, drink driving arrest and move to rugby union ===
Lawless did not play at all in 1936. It was reported in April that he would only play if his “leg trouble is overcome”. Lawless was employed as a lorry driver when on Christmas Eve of the same year he was involved in a drink driving accident which injured two women whom he struck with his car as they were crossing the road. The accident occurred at the corner of Richmond and Ponsonby Roads at 8:45 pm, with both women suffering head injuries. Mrs. Agnes M. Wykes sustained a slight head injury and was discharged after treatment while her daughter, 17-year-old Edna Wykes, suffered severe concussion and was hospitalised with her condition described as being “fairly serious”. Lawless, who was aged 28 at the time, was arrested and charged with being intoxicated while in charge of a car. Edna’s condition 2 days later was described as being “satisfactory”. When Lawless appeared in court he was charged with being intoxicated while in charge of a motor car…and with operating a vehicle without two independent brakes. His license was cancelled for 18 months”. The magistrate stated “one might say that the biggest factor in the accident was the unforgivable fact that the accused drove blind without a windscreen wipe on a foggy, wet night”. Lawless said that he had bought the car for £35 just 12 days earlier with “the object of using the vehicle for a holiday tour with another man”. Lawless’s defender “stressed that he was the sole supporter of a widowed mother, and would lose his only source of livelihood if his license were cancelled”. During his trial both women stated that they had crossed the tramlines and that Lawless was on the wrong side of the road. In addition to the loss of license for 18 months he was also fined £30 and costs of £1 17/.

He subsequently moved out of Auckland to Gisborne where he registered with the rugby code and joined the local Marist club. He was joining along with his Richmond team mate W. Ritchie. He played 6 matches for them after joining mid season scoring a try in a game on 24 July against T.M.P.. Following his debut game it was said that “in all departments he played well and showed a good burst of speed in the loose”. At the start of the 1938 season he was listed to play for Marist in their opening game however he did not take the field and played no matches for them during the season.

Lawless then retired from the oval ball codes for the last time. He spent some time over the next decade playing senior B cricket for Marist and bowls for the Kahutia Bowling Club.

== Personal life and death ==
In his younger years Ray’s life was marred by several incidents involving alcohol which saw him before the courts. On 22 March 1929, aged 19, he was fined £2 for using lurid language and making threatening behaviour towards a couple in downtown Auckland. He was said to be unemployed at the time and picking up work "here and there". Then in July he was fined once again for being drunk in the Gaiety Dance Hall on Karangahape Road and acting inappropriately towards other patrons.

In 1930 Lawless was again before the courts after being involved in an incident at Frankton in Hamilton. A constable was arresting a man in a hotel before closing time for breach of probation when he resisted arrest. Lawless then joined in the melee, trying to assist the arrested man to escape. Lawless was then himself arrested and taken to the station.

Tragedy struck the Lawless family on 13 September 1933. Ray Lawless’s younger brother Charles took his own life in the family home at 54 Dryden Street in Grey Lynn. He was a “crippled” aged 23 and had been in ill-health for the past 12 months and had not been able to work in his occupation as a bootmaker in the days preceding his death due to illness. In 1935 according to the Grey Lynn General Election Roll he was living at 54 Hinemoa Street (now named Hakanoa Street) in Grey Lynn. His sister Marion was living at 45 Hinemoa Street, and his mother at 35 Hinemoa Street.

Raymond married Myrie Millicent Lawless (nee Joy) on 11 April 1939.

On 21 January 1942 Lawless was balloted for service with the Territorial Force. There were 430 named from the Gisborne District and it was said to be the first in which married men had been drawn "during the present war". Only married men without children were balloted. He was listed as living at 1 Norfolk Road at the time. In 1945 the Gisborne Herald reported that he had applied for and been granted permission "to cart wool within a 40 mile radius of the Gisborne Post Office".

At some time in the 1950s Lawless moved back to the Auckland area. He died on 3 June 1968, while in the employment of Ardmore Teachers' Training College as a night watchman and was living in Papakura, Auckland at the time. He was cremated at Waikumete Cemetery on 11 June 1968.

His wife Myrie died on 2 June 1990, aged 81.
