= 1931 Auckland Rugby League season =

The 1931 Auckland Rugby League season was its 23rd.

The inaugural Fox Memorial Shield was won by Marist Old Boys who defeated Devonport United 12–5 in the final round to win by 2 competition points over the same side. This was Marists second ever first grade title after previously winning it in 1924. Devonport United were coached by James O'Brien, the former Devonport player and New Zealand international and they went on to win the Roope Rooster competition defeating Ponsonby United in the final. This was their second time winning the Roope Rooster after they won the inaugural title in 1915. They also beat Marist Old Boys to win the Stormont Shield Trophy for the second year in a row. Alongside these feats Devonport also won the inaugural reserve grade competition with a 5–5 draw in the final securing them the 1 competition point they needed to edge out Ponsonby United. Richmond Rovers won the Stallard Cup by winning the reserve grade knockout competition, defeating Newton Rangers reserves in the final 13–5.

On the final day of the season Mr. Samuel Harris of the Newton Rangers team had a heart attack while running with the ball in the final of the Seven-A-Side charity tournament. The game was called off with no result given. He had played with Newton for 2 seasons after moving to Auckland from Hikurangi. He was single and 26 years of age at the time.

Eastern Suburbs toured New Zealand at the end of the season and played 5 matches including 3 at Carlaw Park against Devonport, Devonport-Marist combined, and an Auckland Colts side.

| Preceded by 1930 | 23rd Auckland Rugby League season 1931 | Succeeded by 1932 |

== Season News ==
=== Club teams by grade participation ===
| Team | Fox Memorial | Reserves | 2nd | 3rd Open | 3rd Int. | 4th | 5th | 6th | 7th | Schools | Midweek | Total |
|---|---|---|---|---|---|---|---|---|---|---|---|---|
| Richmond Rovers | 1 | 1 | 0 | 1 | 1 | 1 | 1 | 1 | 2 | 1 | 0 | 10 |
| City Rovers | 1 | 1 | 1 | 0 | 1 | 1 | 1 | 1 | 1 | 1 | 0 | 9 |
| Ponsonby United | 1 | 1 | 1 | 1 | 1 | 1 | 1 | 0 | 0 | 0 | 0 | 7 |
| Marist Old Boys | 1 | 1 | 0 | 1 | 1 | 1 | 1 | 1 | 0 | 0 | 0 | 7 |
| Devonport United | 1 | 1 | 0 | 1 | 0 | 1 | 1 | 1 | 0 | 1 | 0 | 7 |
| Ellerslie United | .5 | .5 | 0 | 0 | 0 | 1 | 1 | 1 | 1 | 1 | 0 | 6 |
| Newton Rangers | 1 | 1 | 0 | 0 | 0 | 0 | 1 | 1 | 0 | 1 | 0 | 5 |
| Point Chevalier | 0 | 0 | 1 | 0 | 0 | 1 | 0 | 1 | 1 | 0 | 0 | 4 |
| Northcote & Birkenhead Ramblers | 0 | 0 | 1 | 0 | 0 | 1 | 1 | 1 | 0 | 1 | 0 | 5 |
| Glen Lynn | 0 | 0 | 0 | 1 | 1 | 0 | 1 | 0 | 1 | 0 | 0 | 4 |
| Mount Albert United | 0 | 0 | 1 | 0 | 1 | 1 | 1 | 0 | 0 | 0 | 0 | 4 |
| Papatoetoe | 0 | 0 | 0 | 1 | 0 | 1 | 0 | 0 | 1 | 1 | 0 | 4 |
| Akarana | 0 | 0 | 0 | 0 | 1 | 1 | 0 | 1 | 0 | 1 | 0 | 4 |
| Newmarket | 0 | 0 | 0 | 0 | 0 | 1 | 0 | 1 | 1 | 1 | 0 | 4 |
| Papakura | 0 | 0 | 1 | 0 | 0 | 1 | 0 | 0 | 0 | 0 | 0 | 2 |
| Mount Wellington | 0 | 0 | 1 | 0 | 0 | 1 | 0 | 0 | 0 | 0 | 0 | 2 |
| Otahuhu Rovers | .5 | .5 | 0 | 0 | 0 | 0 | 0 | 0 | 0 | 0 | 0 | 1 |
| Māngere United | 0 | 0 | 1 | 0 | 0 | 0 | 0 | 0 | 0 | 0 | 0 | 1 |
| Glenora | 0 | 0 | 0 | 0 | 1 | 0 | 0 | 0 | 0 | 0 | 0 | 1 |
| Avondale | 0 | 0 | 0 | 0 | 0 | 1 | 0 | 0 | 0 | 1 | 0 | 2 |
| Auckland Locomotives (Railway) | 0 | 0 | 0 | 0 | 0 | 0 | 0 | 0 | 0 | 0 | 1 | 1 |
| City Markets | 0 | 0 | 0 | 0 | 0 | 0 | 0 | 0 | 0 | 0 | 1 | 1 |
| Combined Taxis | 0 | 0 | 0 | 0 | 0 | 0 | 0 | 0 | 0 | 0 | 1 | 1 |
| Ellerslie Town Board Rovers | 0 | 0 | 0 | 0 | 0 | 0 | 0 | 0 | 0 | 0 | 1 | 1 |
| New Zealand Fertilisers | 0 | 0 | 0 | 0 | 0 | 0 | 0 | 0 | 0 | 0 | 1 | 1 |
| Nicholson Park (Mt Eden) | 0 | 0 | 0 | 0 | 0 | 0 | 0 | 0 | 0 | 0 | 1 | 1 |
| Post and Telegraph (Messengers) | 0 | 0 | 0 | 0 | 0 | 0 | 0 | 0 | 0 | 0 | 1 | 1 |
| Stonex and Stormont's | 0 | 0 | 0 | 0 | 0 | 0 | 0 | 0 | 0 | 0 | 1 | 1 |
| Waterside Workers | 0 | 0 | 0 | 0 | 0 | 0 | 0 | 0 | 0 | 0 | 1 | 1 |
| Total | 7 | 7 | 8 | 6 | 8 | 15 | 10 | 10 | 8 | 10 | 9 | 98 |

=== Fox Memorial Shield replaces Monteith Shield ===
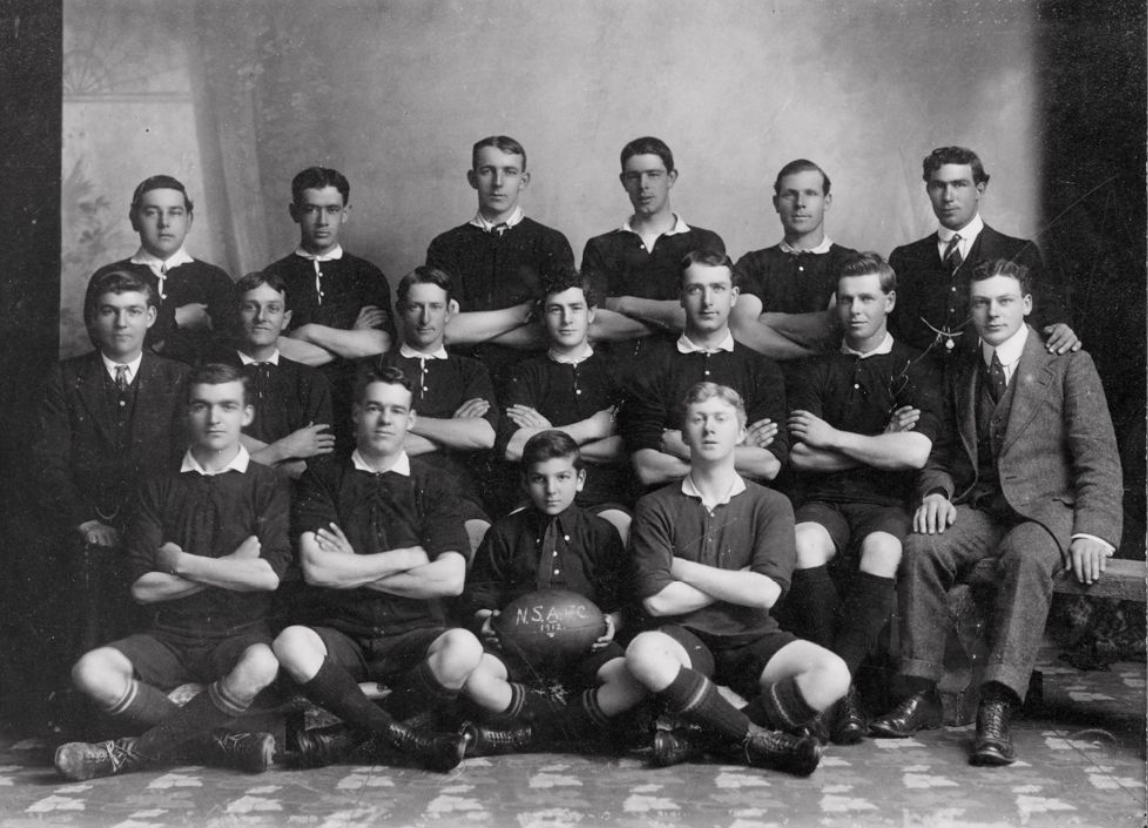
Fox in the back row, third from the left in the 1912 North Shore second grade side

It was the first season where the premier senior teams had competed for the Fox Memorial Shield. Prior to 1931 the trophy awarded was the Monteith Shield (1920–1930), and before that the Myers Cup (1910–14) (there were no trophies awarded during WW1 despite the first grade championship being competed for each season). The donor of the Monteith Shield had written to the league asking permission to withdraw the trophy from club competition and that the league play for a new trophy named after Edward Vincent Fox who had died the season previous and who had been heavily involved in Auckland Rugby League for a long period of time. The new trophy was being donated by friends of Fox. The trophy was finished and presented to the league in September. It was described thus; "measuring 27 inches across by 22 inches deep, the base is a handsome sample of polished rimu, with overlay of contrasting pūriri, on which is an ornate centrepiece in oxidised silver depicting an incident of play in the New Zealand v Australia match of 1926". The donators of the trophy even went to the extent of sending the silver piece to England to have it effectively reproduced.

The Auckland City Council Parks Committee designated the following of its grounds to the league code: Auckland Domain (2), Outer Domain (1), Victoria Park, Auckland (1), Walker Road (2), Western Springs Reserve (1), Grey Lynn Park (1), and 1 additional ground at Grey Lynn to alternate between rugby and league.

=== Financial statement and annual report – From childhood to manhood ===
The annual report to be filed at the annual general meeting showed that the league had a £9,711 5/9 surplus with total assets of £10,534 19/4. As there were smaller crowds in 1930 the gate receipts were £2,282 12/, down from £3,465 10/5 in 1929. The Junior Management Committee reported that the number of juniors registered was 1,930 compared with 984 the previous year, and 63 teams took the field. At the annual general meeting Mr. James Carlaw said that "this is a very important meeting, as we have now reached our twenty-first birthday, and have developed from childhood to manhood". Mr. Phelan presented trophies to the various winners from the previous season. At the Devonport annual meeting Mr. A. Ferguson who was a member of the New Zealand Council and who was presiding over the meeting said that the league game in New Zealand needed to follow the Australian model. He stated that they "demonstrated the value of physical fitness, which was produced by intensive, scientific training".

=== Senior competition restructuring and Carlaw Park gate takings ===
A management committee meeting which also included the special committee setup the previous year to look into the restructuring of the Senior A and Senior B competitions adjusted their original plans. It had been decided at the end of the 1930 season to reduce the Senior A competition from eight teams to six, thus forcing teams into merging with one another. After the meeting this was adjusted to seven teams. The teams would be Devonport, Richmond Rovers, Ellerslie-Otahuhu (which also included the Māngere United club, who could then choose their own name), Marist Old Boys, City, Newton, and Ponsonby United. The Kingsland team which had been removed from the A grade asked for permission to join with the Marist Old Boys. While the Parnell club which has existed since 1921 amalgamated with City Rovers.

The B grade (essentially the second division which had run from 1925 to 1930) was still to be eliminated. The league would encourage B grade players to try out for the reserve grade teams in the A grade clubs.

In a major development for the rugby league game in Auckland the special committee recommended that winning teams would be granted 12.5% of the net gate takings each weekend with losing teams sharing a "trifle less". The league would also enforce a rule where every Senior A club must field a reserve grade team "of sufficient calibre to satisfy the management committee". If they failed to do so they would be vulnerable to being removed from the A grade. The league also reserved the right to set the two lowest teams together at the end of the season against each other in a match and eliminating the losers, or compelling them to improve their standard of play or withdraw from the league.

=== Eastern Suburbs tour of New Zealand ===
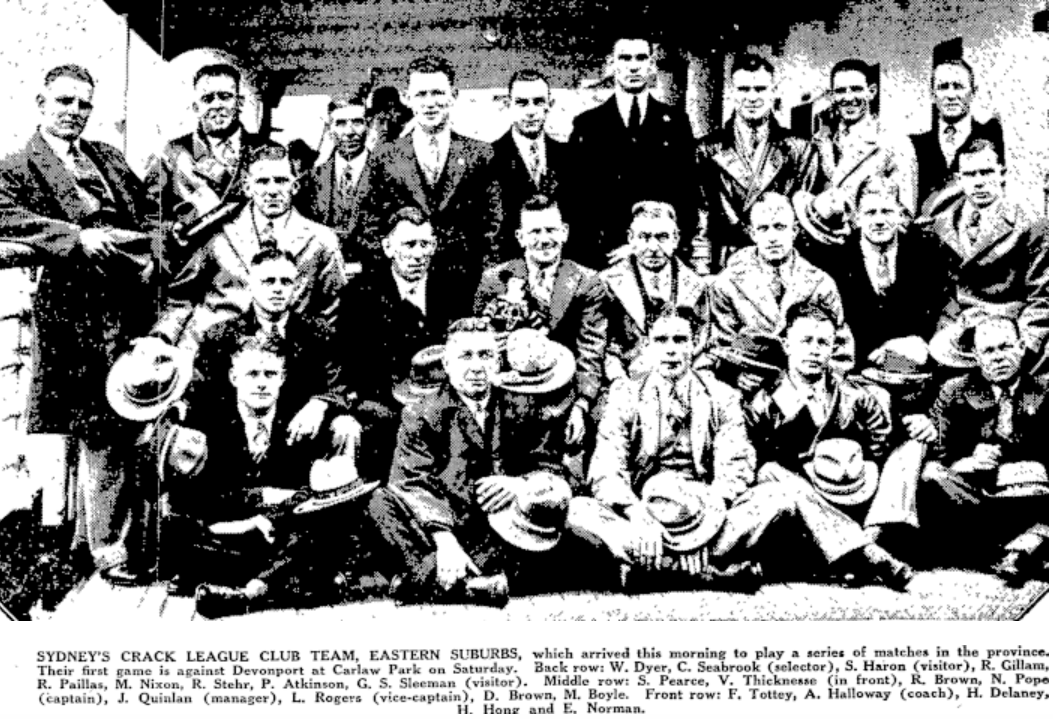

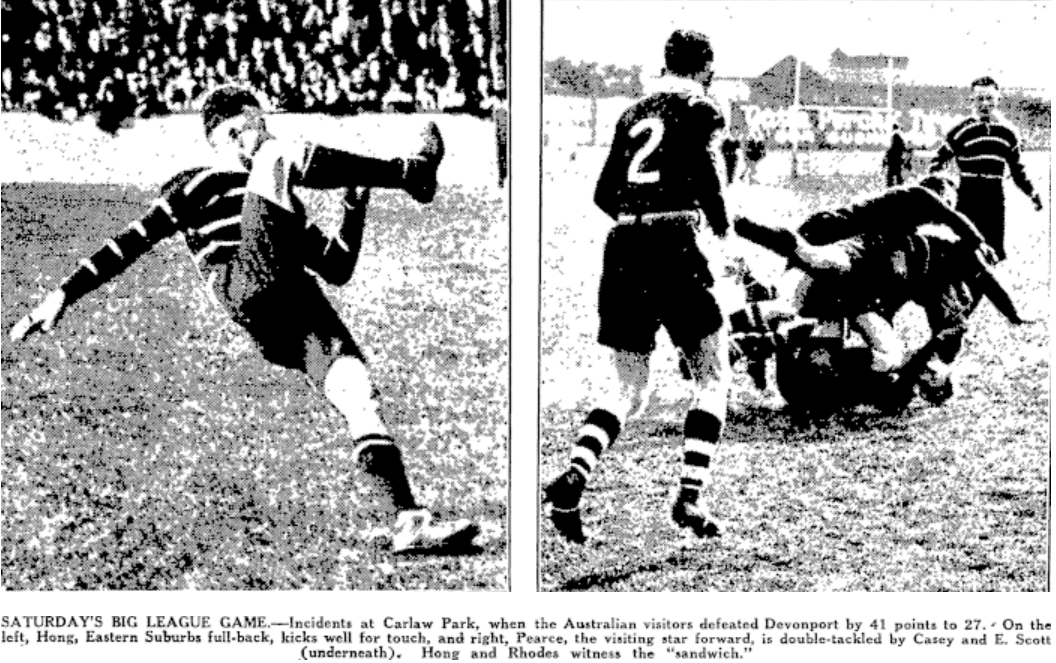

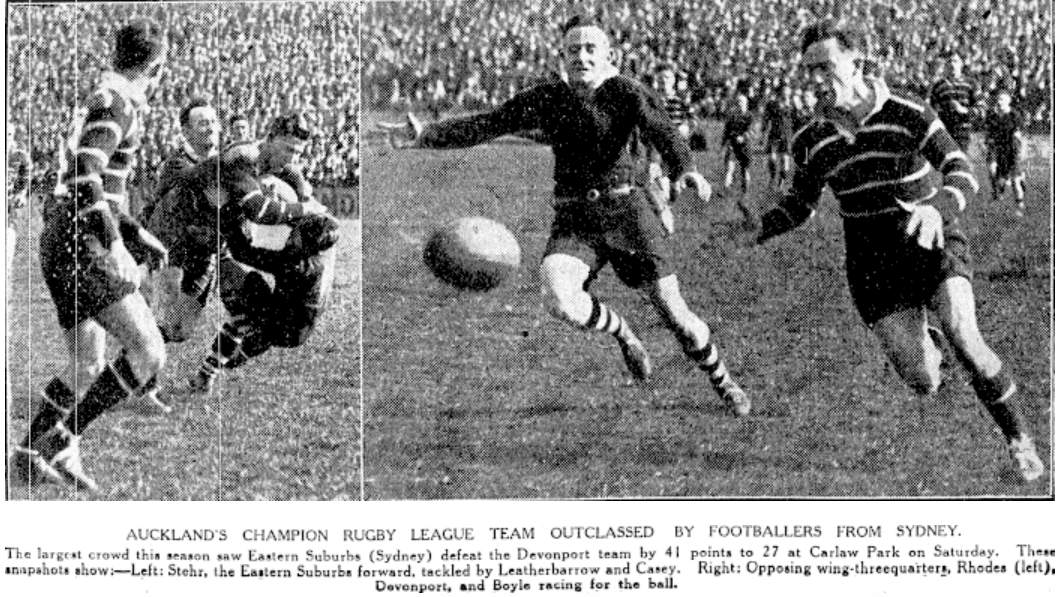

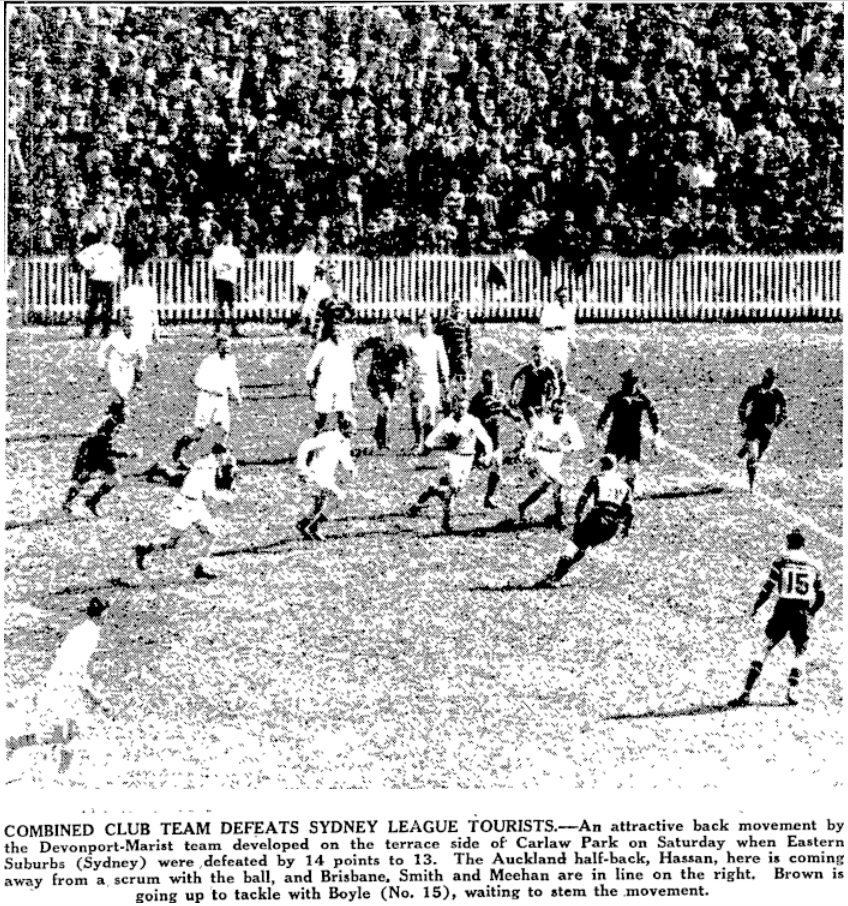

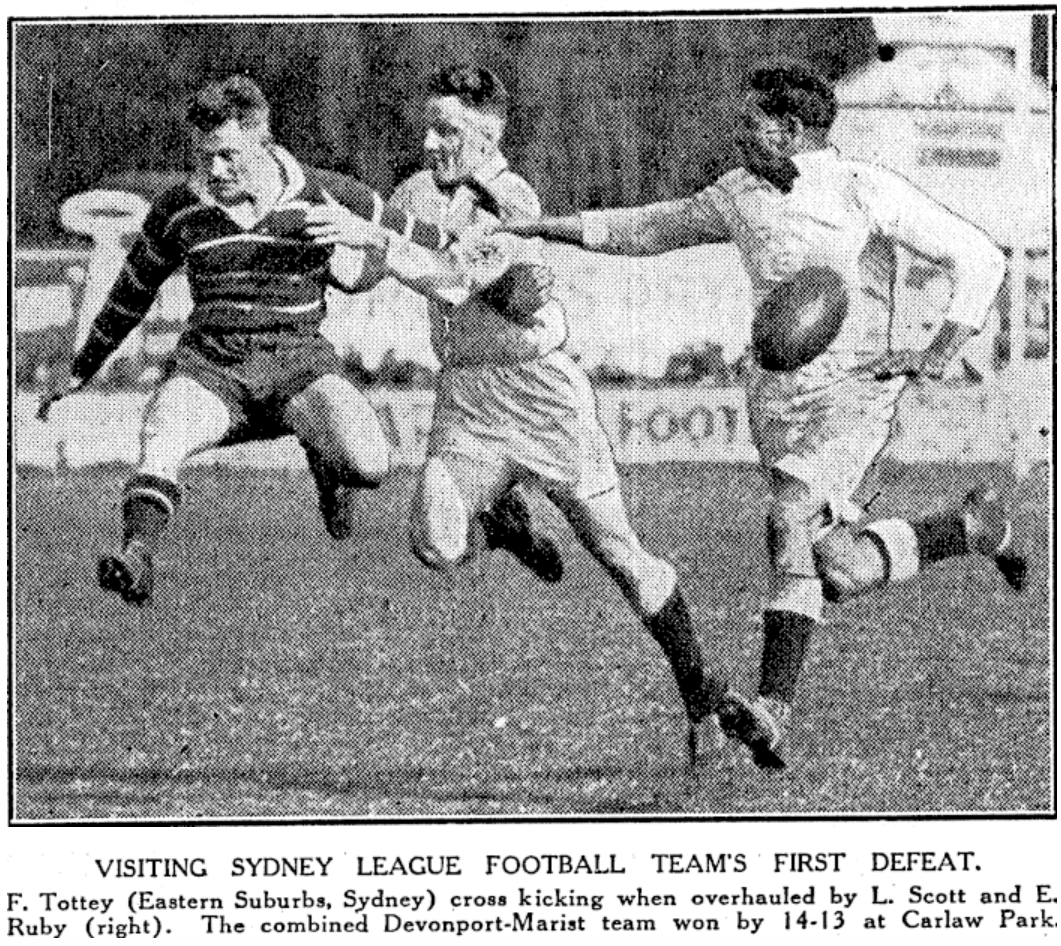

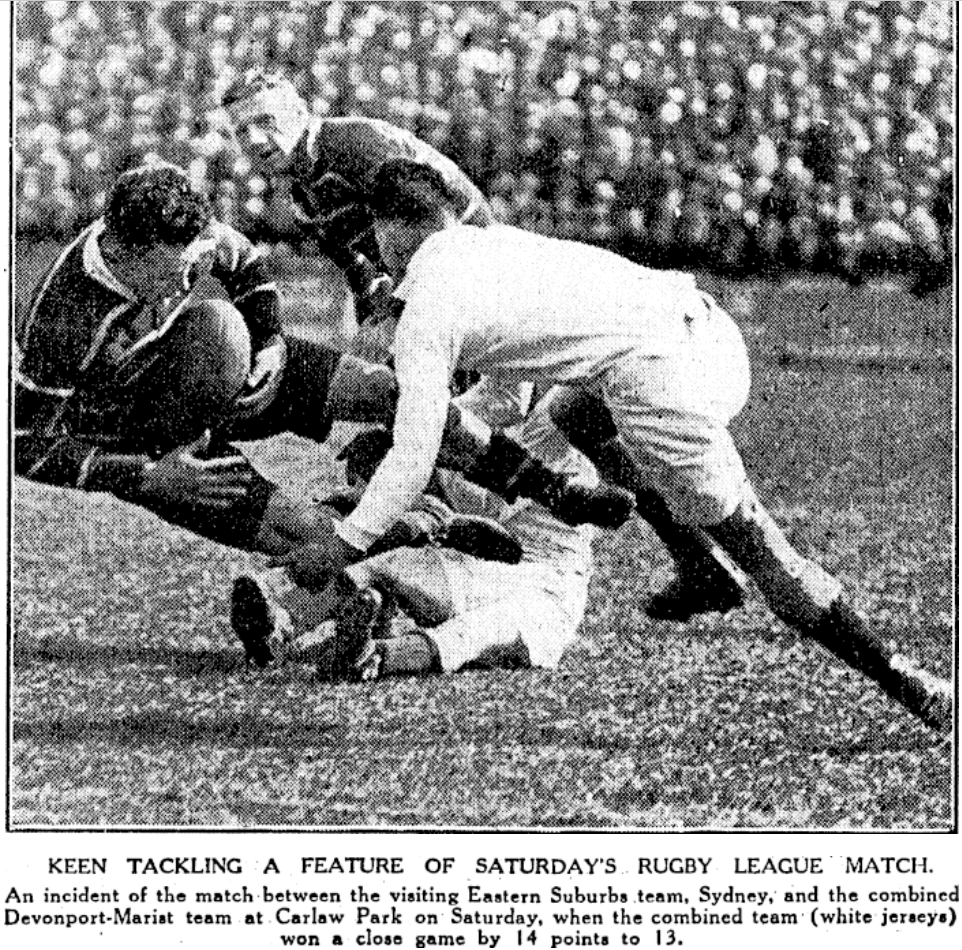

In mid October the Eastern Suburbs club team from Sydney toured New Zealand. They began their tour with a match against Northland in Whangarei on Thursday, October 8 before meeting the Auckland championsDevonport at Carlaw Park two days later. They then travelled to Hamilton where they played South Auckland while also fitting in a trip to see the sights of Rotorua. Eastern Suburbs were captained in their match with South Auckland by Fred Tottey who had attended Hamilton Boys High School in his teens and Mount Albert Grammar School in Auckland before that. Eastern Suburbs then travelled back to Auckland where they played against a combined Marist-Devonport team who inflicted the touring sides only defeat with a 14–13 defeat before a crowd of 15,000. Their final match was against an Auckland Colts side which included several current or future New Zealand internationals, namely Ted Mincham, Len Scott, Dick Smith, Wilf Hassan, Bert Leatherbarrow, and Ed St George before returning home with 4 wins and a loss.

| 8 October | Northland | 11–23 | Eastern Suburbs | Kensington Park, Whangarei |
| 3:00 | Try: E O'Callaghan; Con: C Hamilton; Pen: C Hamilton 3 | | Try: Dave Brown 2, Roy Paillas, Ray Stehr, Hilton Delaney; Con: Roy Paillas 2, Morrie Boyle; Pen: Roy Paillas | Attendance: 2,000; Referee: J Petterson |

| 10 October | Devonport | 27–41 | Eastern Suburbs | Carlaw Park 1 |
| 3:00 | Try: Dick Smith, Allan Seagar, Hugh Simpson, Len Scott, Albert Laing; Con: Dick Smith 4 Pen: Dick Smith 2 | | Try: Ernie Norman, Morrie Boyle 2, Dick Brown, Dave Brown, Les Rogers 2, Viv Thicknesse, Fred Tottey; Con: Morrie Boyle 6, Dave Brown | Attendance: 17,000; Referee: Les Bull |

| 14 October | South Auckland | 14–23 | Eastern Suburbs | Steele Park, Hamilton |
| 3:00 | Try: John Whorskey, Huatahi Paki; Con: John Whorskey; Pen: John Whorskey 3 | | Try: Roy Pallais, Fred Tottey 2, Dave Brown, Joe Pearce; Con: Roy Pallais 2, Norm Pope; Pen: Roy Pallais | Attendance: 2,000; Referee: A Harlock |

| 17 October | Devonport-Marist | 14–13 | Eastern Suburbs | Carlaw Park 1 |
| 3:15 | Try: Len Scott, Hec Brisbane; Con: Alan Clarke; Pen: Alan Clarke 3 | | Try: Dave Brown 2, Fred Tottey; Con: Morrie Boyle 2 | Attendance: 15,000; Referee: Percy Rogers |

| 21 October | Auckland Colts | 13–18 | Eastern Suburbs | Carlaw Park 1 |
| 4:00 | Try: Wilf Hassan, Ted Mincham, Bob Carter; Con: Dick Smith; Pen: Dick Smith | | Try: Roy Pallais, Morrie Boyle 3 Con: Roy Pallais, Dave Brown 2 | Referee: Vic Simpson |

=== Rule changes ===
At the Management Committee meeting prior to the start of the season it was decided to adhere to the latest rules, where a team forcing the ball in their own in goal area would take a drop kick from the 25-yard line as opposed from their own try line. There was an adjustment to the weight allowance from the fourth grade down, and sixth grade players should be under 18 and a half on 1 May. At a following Management Committee meeting it was reported that the English Rugby League had advised that at scrum put in's the loose head would be transferred from the defending team to the attacking team.

On 15 August a referee was assaulted by a player after a match between the City and Newmarket Fourth Grade teams at Western Springs Stadium. He had ordered off a player from each team. The City player came back on the field and his team refused to remove him so the referee called the match off. He was then harassed by a number of players and one of them then fought with him, "the pair rolled on the ground fighting for a few minutes, the referee holding his own until some spectators intervened and separated" them.

=== New clubs at Papakura and Glenora, and several amalgamations ===
On March 26 the Papakura Rugby League club was formed with 60 players enrolling. They applied to the Papakura Town Board for use of the reserve at Papakura. This was granted as the entire club had switched over from Rugby Union meaning they had no competition for the field. The council said that if a representative rugby game was being played on the field then the league team could use Prince Edward Park (which later became their home ground and remains so to this day). On Saturday, 18 April they played a practice match with Mount Wellington at Papakura. The match was won by Mount Wellington by 8 points to 5. Papakura's points came from an unconverted try to Johnstone, and I. Wilson kicked a penalty goal. They held their first social on the evening of Wednesday 22 April at the Paragon Theatre.

The Kingsland Athletic club joined with Marist Old Boys meaning their senior players would join those of Marist. Kingsland were already an amalgamated club involving Kingsland Rovers and Grafton Athletic (originally named Maritime and not to be confused with the Grafton Athletic club which existed from 1914 to 1922). This placed Marist as one of the early favourites to win the Senior Grade. This was discussed in an article on the prospects of all the teams in the New Zealand Herald.

The Ellerslie United, Otahuhu Rovers, and Māngere United clubs combined to form a senior team with the Māngere Senior B team being regraded to first junior (2nd grade) with the team playing as part of the Ellerslie-Otahuhu side. However Māngere United then sent a deputation to a Management Committee meeting asking to be able to play as a separate institution as a junior club rather than be a part of the Ellerslie-Otahuhu amalgamation. They wished to be affiliated under their own name rather than amalgamate with Ellerslie. Several speakers from Māngere they said that they wished to play league football but maintain their own identity as a Māori team. The League said that there should be a conference with Ellerslie and in the meantime they would play for one week with Ellerslie. At a league meeting on 27 May the league decided to uphold their earlier ruling and enforce the amalgamation with the decision reviewed at the end of the season. It was expressed that the Māngere players were willing to play as the league suggested. Mr. Jim Rukutai suggested that Māngere be granted permission to retain their identity for twelve months, subject to all transfers being through the Ellerslie-Otahuhu United Club. The chairman of the league said "he did not think that there was any objection to Māngere playing as the Māngere section of the amalgamated club, but it was the duty of the League to uphold Ellerslie-Otahuhu Club". In the meantime he thought "moral suasion should be used by the members and the position would right itself". At the Management Committee meeting on 10 June it was reported by the chairman that the Māngere and Ellerslie clubs had reached a satisfactory agreement and that "the Māori senior team,... was willing to continue playing the league code. It was intended that Māngere should apply for the resignation of its players who had already played for Ellerslie" The matter would be deferred for one week.

It was announced at a City Rovers club meeting that the Parnell club had amalgamated with them. They would enter teams in the senior, reserve senior, first junior, third intermediate, fourth, fifth, sixth, and seventh grades, and also in the primary school competition. Ten of the Parnell senior B players were regraded to first class juniors and would play for that particular City Rovers side.

In June a new club was registered in the Glen Eden district and was named Glenora. They entered a team in the third grade intermediate. There was a team in the area named Glen Lynn at the time which was a combination of the New Lynn and Glen Eden sides of the late 1920s, and so to distinguish them Glenora chose that name as some of their players were from the Oratia area, and the name was initially spelled as Glen Ora.

== Fox Memorial Shield (1st grade championship) ==
The Senior Grade was reduced from 8 teams to 7 for the 1931 season. Each team had to field a reserve side and their matches were to be played prior to the A team's matches at the same venue.

=== Fox Memorial standings ===
| Team | Pld | W | D | L | F | A | Pts |
|---|---|---|---|---|---|---|---|
| Marist Old Boys | 12 | 11 | 0 | 1 | 204 | 88 | 22 |
| Devonport United | 12 | 10 | 0 | 2 | 178 | 92 | 20 |
| Richmond Rovers | 12 | 7 | 1 | 4 | 143 | 93 | 15 |
| Ponsonby United | 12 | 6 | 1 | 5 | 152 | 143 | 13 |
| Newton Rangers | 12 | 2 | 2 | 8 | 83 | 145 | 6 |
| City Rovers | 12 | 2 | 1 | 9 | 132 | 179 | 5 |
| Ellerslie-Otahuhu United | 12 | 1 | 1 | 10 | 85 | 237 | 3 |

=== Fox Memorial fixtures ===
==== Round 1 ====
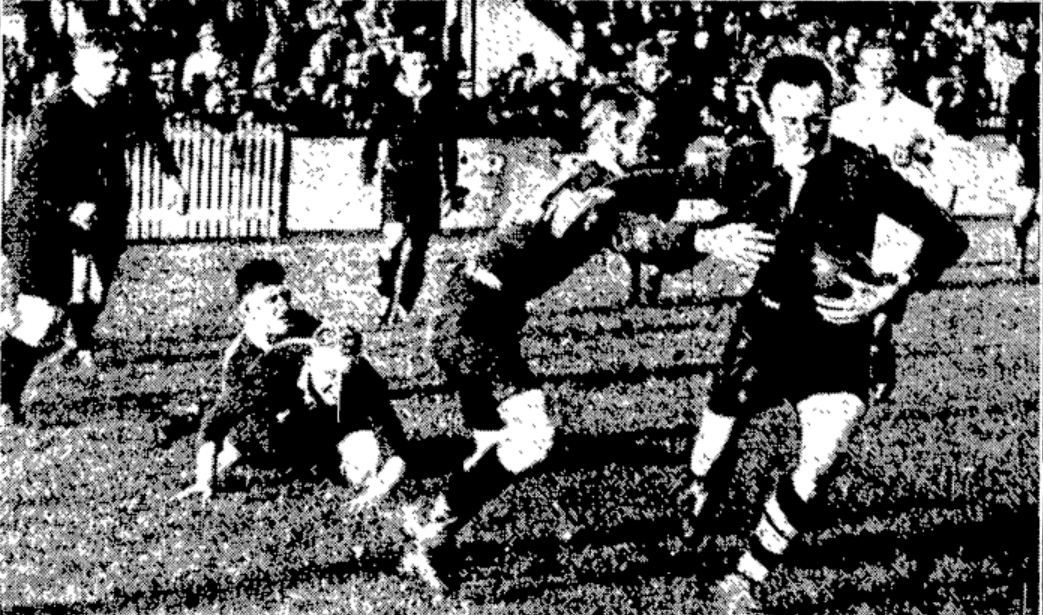
S Casey (Devonport) being tackled by Kerr (City). Hugh Simpson (Devonport) is on the ground having been tackled by Joe Hadley.

In Round 1 Marist won after time however the play was continued erroneously. Time was up but the time keeper allowed additional tackles and did not ring the bell until after the winning try had been scored. Richmond protested the result and after multiple meetings it was eventually decided by the league Management Committee to replay the match. During the game Ray McKinnon (Richmond) fractured his leg and was treated at Auckland Hospital before being sent home. For Devonport, Alf Scott came out of retirement while his brother Len Scott returned from a year in Fiji. He had been a winger for four seasons for Devonport but played in the loose forwards in this match and was reported to have played well. Puti Tipene Watene was unable to play fullback for City due to having influenza and was replaced by Kerr, a recruit from the Parnell club and he was said to have played well. Ben Davidson played a good game in the City backs after returning to City the previous season after playing 67 games in England for Wigan.

| 2 May | Devonport | 23–18 | City | Carlaw Park 1 |
| 3:00 | Try: Alf Scott, Allan Seagar, Trevor O'Leary, J Harding, R O'Donnell; Con: Alf Scott, Allan Seagar 3 | | Try: C Reynolds, George Perry, Ben Davidson 2 Con: Kerr 3 | Referee: Les Bull |

| 2 May | Marist | 11–10* | Richmond | Carlaw Park 2 |
| 3:00 | Try: Gordon Campbell 2, Claude List; Con: Leonard Riley | | Try: Stan Prentice, Bill Telford; Con: George Davis 2 | Referee: Percy Rogers |

| 2 May | Ellerslie-Otahuhu | 5–5 | Newton | Ellerslie Reserve |
| 3:00 | Try: A Hickey; Pen: Craddock Dufty | | Try: Charles Allan; Pen: Claude Dempsey | Referee: E McCall |

==== Round 2 ====
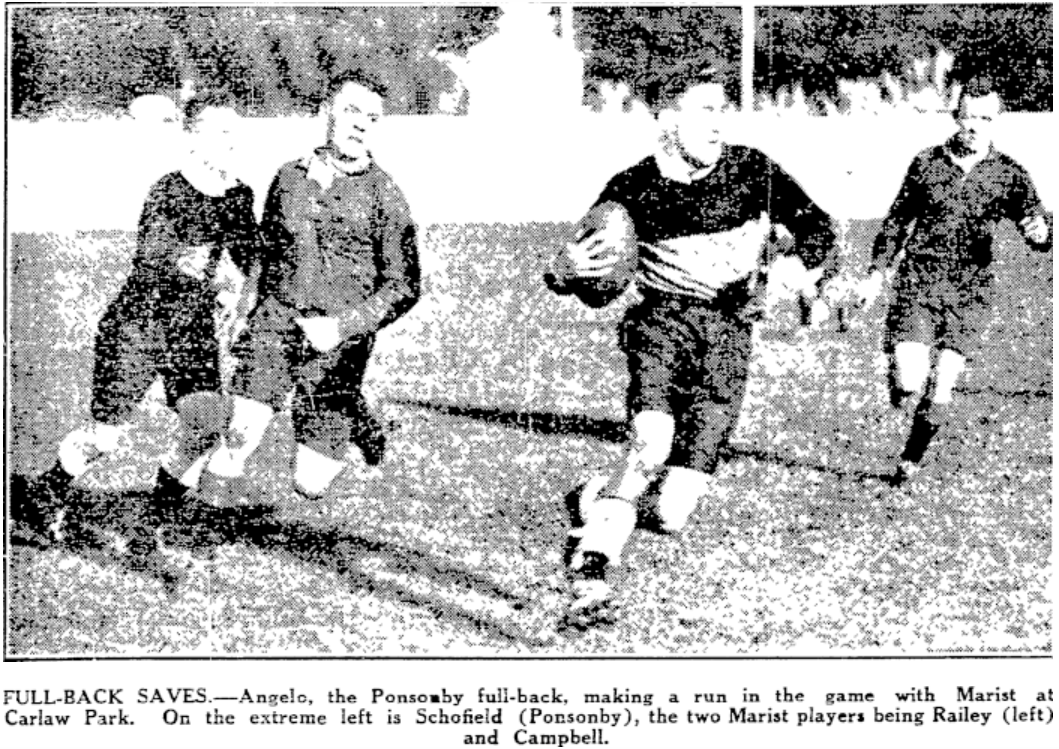

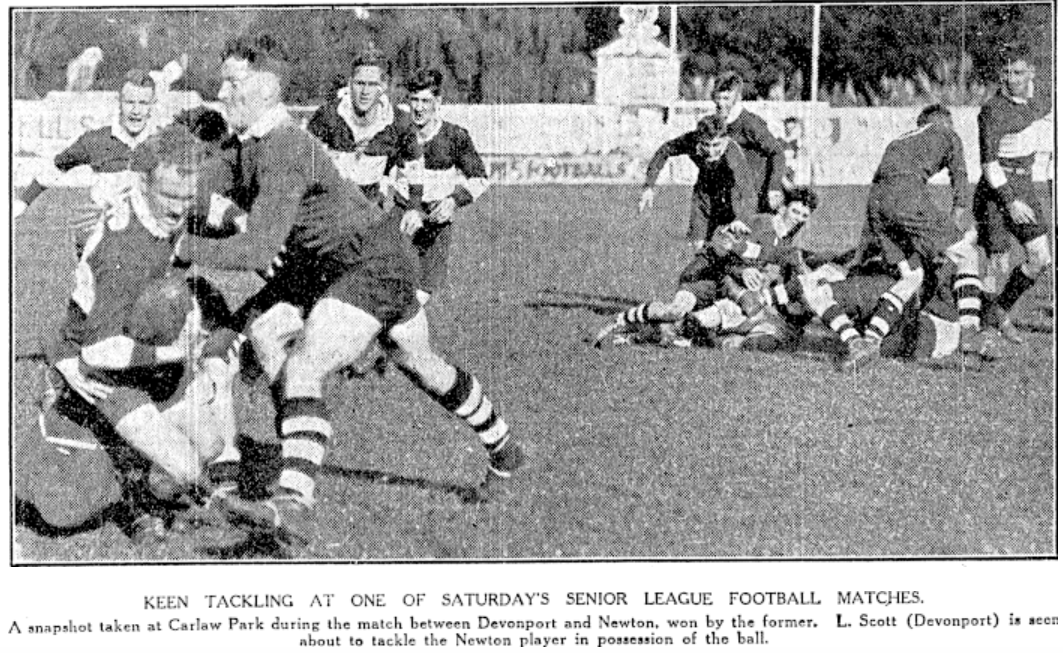

In the match between Marist and Ponsonby, Heck Lunn (Ponsonby) left the field in the 2nd half with a broken rib and was taken to Auckland Hospital. Frank Delgrosso started the game for Ponsonby at the unfamiliar position of halfback, though the veteran had by now played at every position in the backline for Ponsonby, Auckland, and New Zealand. Marist did well to win after losing their forward Young in the first half who was replaced by Fraser Webberley, and then Carter went off injured in the second half forcing Alan Clarke into the backs and then later he was forced from the field through injury too. Horace Hunt debuted for North Shore after coming on for the injured S Casey in the forwards. Hunt was the Auckland cricket side's wicket keeper and interestingly Verdun Scott played for the North Shore side later in the decade and also become the Auckland wicket keeper and ultimately New Zealand wicket keeper.

| 9 May | Marist | 20–9 | Ponsonby | Carlaw Park 1 |
| 3:00 | Try: Phil Brady, George Batchelor, Hec Brisbane, Claude List; Con: George Batchelor, Ike Railey; Pen: Alan Clarke; Drop: Claude List | | Try: L Winters, A Schofield, Cyril Thompson | Referee: Percy Rogers |

| 9 May | Richmond | 28–15 | City | Carlaw Park 2 |
| 3:00 | Try: Stan Prentice, N Pell 2, Ray Lawless, W Ritchie, J Patterson; Con: George Davis 4 Pen: George Davis | | Try: George Munce, Joe Hadley; Con: Ben Davidson; Pen: Ben Davidson | Referee: Arthur Rae |

| 9 May | Devonport | 26–0 | Newton | Carlaw Park 1 |
| 3:00 | Try: Len Scott, Allan Seagar, Horace Hunt, Leslie O'Leary 2, Ted Scott; Con: Allan Seagar 2, Leslie O'Leary 2 | | | Referee: Vic Simpson |

==== Round 3 ====
The Round 3 match between Richmond and Newton was the first ever senior league match played at Western Springs Stadium which had opened for cycling and field sports in 1929.

| 16 May | Ponsonby | 24–13 | City | Carlaw Park 1 |
| 3:00 | Try: Victor Fagan, L Winters, E Friend; Con: Frank Delgrosso 3 Pen: Frank Delgrosso 3 | | Try: Laurie Barchard, Len Barchard, Ben Davidson; Con: Steve Watene; Pen: Steve Watene | Referee: John Stormont |

| 16 May | Devonport | 23–12 | Ellerslie-Otahuhu | Carlaw Park 2 |
| 3:00 | Try: Ernest Ruby, Len Scott 2, Trevor O’Leary, J Harding; Con: Les O’Leary 2, Allan Seagar | | Try: Drew, Quirke; Con: Craddock Dufty 2 Drop: Craddock Dufty | Referee: Wilfred Simpson |

| 16 May | Richmond | 6–3 | Newton | Western Springs |
| 3:00 | Try: Bill Davis, Patterson | | Try: Arnold Porteous | Referee: H Taylor |

==== Round 4 ====
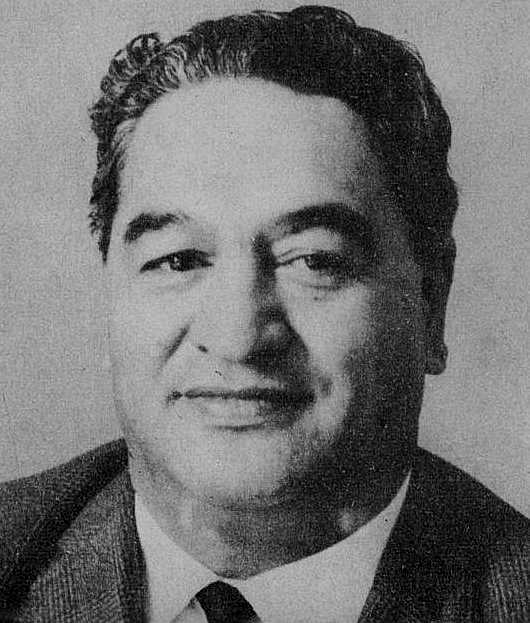
Puti Tipene Watene

Ray Lawless the Richmond forward received a bad kick to the face during their win over the Ellerslie-Otahuhu side on Carlaw Park 2 and it was thought he would miss several games but in fact played the following week. He had played a game for the senior side in 1929 as a promoted junior but did not begin to establish himself in the senior side until this season. He went on to represent New Zealand from 1932 to 1935. New Zealand representative and future M.P. Puti Tipene (Steve) Watene kicked five goals for City in their win over Marist.

| 23 May | City | 16–2 | Marist | Carlaw Park 1 |
| 3:00 | Try: Laurie Barchard, James Everson; Con: Steve Watene; Pen: Steve Watene 4 | | Pen: Charles Gregory | Referee: Frank Thompson |

| 23 May | Richmond | 17–9 | Ellerslie-Otahuhu | Carlaw Park 2 |
| 3:00 | Try: George Davis, Bill Telford, Stan Prentice; Con: George Davis 2 Pen: George Davis 2 | | Try: J Hemingway, Boswell, Craddock Dufty | Referee: Bertie Emirali |

| 23 May | Ponsonby | 20–8 | Newton | Western Springs |
| 3:00 | Try: Doug McLeay 2, Stanley Goodwin, Ellis Friend; Con: Frank Delgrosso 3 Pen: Frank Delgrosso | | Try: Charles Allen, Hill; Con: Hill | Referee: Les Bull |

==== Round 5 ====
Following Newton's loss to Marist their halfback Arthur Porteous collapsed due to concussion and was taken to Auckland Hospital. Ted Brimble scored all of Newton's points with three tries in their 18–9 loss to Marist. Within one minute of the kickoff R. O'Donnell of Devonport was injured tackling Stan Prentice and had to leave the field being replaced by J Harding who had just finished playing a reserve grade game. Ernest Ruby made his first appearance of the season for Devonport after coming out of retirement. He played for City in 1924 and 1925 before moving to Devonport. He ultimately played for them from 1926 to 1932 after originally being a junior for the short lived Riverhead Rugby League Club in 1916. As a Māori he was one of the earliest to play in the Auckland rugby league competitions which was very Pākehā dominated in the 1910s and 1920s. He played nine games for Auckland from 1927 to 1931. Samuel Harris was likely on debut for Newton in this match on the wing. He died in a 7-a-side match at the end of the season after collapsing at Carlaw Park.

| 30 May | Devonport | 13–5 | Richmond | Carlaw Park 1 |
| 3:00 | Try: Hugh Simpson, Len Scott, S Casey; Con: Alf Scott 2 | | Try: Stan Prentice; Con: George Davis | Referee: Bertie Emirali |

| 30 May | Marist | 18–9 | Newton | Carlaw Park 2 |
| 3:00 | Try: Wilf Hassan, Hec Brisbane 2, George Batchelor; Con: Charles Gregory 3 | | Try: Ted Brimble 3 | Referee: Les Bull |

| 30 May | Ellerslie-Otahuhu | 8–24 | Ponsonby | Ellerslie Reserve |
| 3:00 | Try: A Hobbs, A Hickey; Con: Craddock Dufty | | Try: Ellis Friend, Pat Skelton 2, Cyril Thompson, George Gardiner, John Angelo; Con: Ellis Friend 2, Victor Fagan | Referee: E McCall |

==== Round 1 replay ====
This match was replayed from Round 1 when the time keeper allowed play to continue well after the bel should have been rung. In the replayed match Herb Carter for Marist was ordered off for “rough play”. Charles Gregory and Gordon Campbell both of Marist then left the field with injuries leaving Marist to hang on with 10 men for the last few minutes of the game.

| 6 June | Marist | 13–7 | Richmond | Carlaw Park 1 |
| 3:00 | Try: Norm Campbell, Phil Brady, Young; Con: Charles Gregory; Pen: Charles Gregory | | Try: Ray Lawless; Pen: George Davis 2 | Referee: Vic Simpson |

==== Round 6 ====
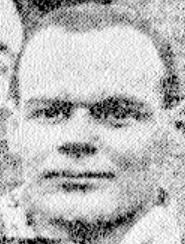
Hec Brisbane

The game at Western Springs was played on a very poor field with a wet and greasy ball and a field that was close to a 'quagmire' with both teams failing to score a single point. Hec Brisbane in his ninth season of 1st grade rugby league scored three tries for Marist in their easy 39–3 win over the Ellerslie-Otahuhu side. It was reported that M Lee, the Richmond fullback had broken his collarbone and would not play again this season. The Herald reported an amusing incident in the Marist v Ellerslie-Otahuhu game when Leslie Olliff (Ellerslie-Otahuhu) fed the scrum and the Marist hooker reached down with his hand to pick up a shilling piece he saw on the ground. The referee, Frank Thompson who was unaware penalised him for using his hands in the scrum, with Donovan then handing the coin to a member of the crowd.

| 13 June | Devonport | 9–8 | Ponsonby | Carlaw Park 1 |
| 3:00 | Try: Len Scott, Trevor O'Leary, Les O'Leary | | Try: Doug McLeay, White; Drop: Pat Skelton | Referee: Les Bull |

| 13 June | Marist | 39–3 | Ellerslie-Otahuhu | Carlaw Park 2 |
| 3:00 | Try: Hec Brisbane 3, George Drew 3, George Batchelor 2, Wilf Hassan; Con: Pat Meehan 6 | | Try: Stan Webb | Referee: Frank Thompson |

| 13 June | City | 0–0 | Newton | Western Springs |
| 3:00 | | | | Referee: Percy Rogers |

==== Round 7 ====
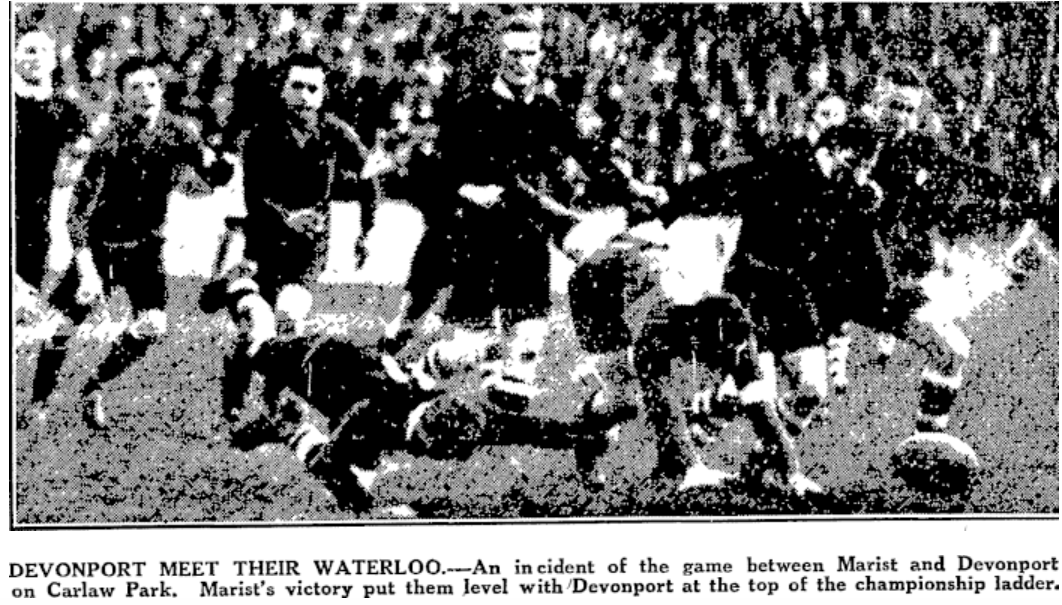

Marist and Devonport met in a top of the table match with Devonport first with a 5–0 record and Marist second with a 4–1 record. Marist's win saw them draw level. Marist wore white arm bands as a mark of respect to George Drew, a senior player who had been killed by a fall of earth at Waitakaruru 4 days earlier at the age of 28.

| 20 June | Marist | 11–4 | Devonport | Carlaw Park 1 |
| 3:00 | Try: George Batchelor 2, Pat Meehan; Pen: Alan Clarke | | Pen: Lindsay Simons, Allan Seagar | Referee: E McCall |

| 20 June | Richmond | 2–2 | Ponsonby | Carlaw Park 2 |
| 3:00 | Pen: Ted Mincham | | Pen: E Friend | Referee: Percy Rogers |

| 20 June | City | 20–2 | Ellerslie-Otahuhu | Auckland Domain 1 |
| 3:00 | Try: William McLaughlin 2, Laurie Barchard 2 Con: Steve Watene 2 Pen: Steve Watene 2 | | Pen: Hickey | Referee: Bertie Victor Emirali |

==== Round 8 ====
| 27 June | Devonport | 16–5 | City | Carlaw Park 1 |
| 3:00 | Try: P Masefield, C Rhodes, Len Scott, O’Donnell; Con: Allan Seagar 2 | | Try: Alderton; Pen: Steve Watene | Referee: Percy Rogers |

| 27 June | Newton | 14–3 | Ellerslie-Otahuhu | Carlaw Park 2 |
| 3:00 | Try: Ed St George 2, Hill, Stanley Francis; Con: Hill | | Try: Drew | Referee: Les Bull |

| 27 June | Marist | 8–3 | Richmond | Western Springs |
| 3:00 | Try: Claude List, Fraser Webberley; Pen: Alan Clarke | | Try: Jones | Referee: Frank Thompson |

==== Round 9 ====
In the Richmond – City match both Stan Prentice and Steve Watene were both sent off for fighting. At their hearing the both denied fighting but admitted to struggling with each other after a tackle, and after hearing evidence the case against them was dismissed. At the Devonport Domain the game between Devonport and Newton was held up by a draught horse coming on the field and standing in front of the Devonport goal posts. It was eventually sent running off to surrounding farm land.

| 4 July | Marist | 25–10 | Ponsonby | Carlaw Park 1 |
| 3:00 | Try: George Batchelor, Phil Brady 2, Pat Meehan 2, Claude List 2 Con: George Batchelor, Pat Meehan | | Try: Cyril Thompson, Ellis Friend; Pen: Frank Delgrosso 2 | Referee: Les Bull |

| 4 July | Richmond | 11–8 | City | Carlaw Park 2 |
| 3:00 | Try: N Pell, Ted Mincham, George Davis; Con: Ted Mincham | | Try: James Everson, William McLaughlin; Con: Steve Watene | Referee: John Stormont |

| 4 July | Devonport | 20–5 | Newton | Devonport Domain |
| 3:00 | Try: Ernest Ruby 3, Alf Scott, R O'Donnell, Trevor O'Leary; Con: Lindsay Simons | | Try: A Pope; Con: Hill | Referee: E McCall |

==== Round 10 ====
| 11 July | Devonport | 14–10 | Richmond | Carlaw Park 1 |
| 3:00 | Try: Dick Smith, J Harding; Con: Alf Scott; Pen: Lindsay Simons, Alf Scott 2 | | Try: Ted Mincham, Stan Prentice; Con: George Davis; Pen: Ted Mincham | Referee: Percy Rogers |

| 11 July | Ponsonby | 20–17 | Ellerslie-Otahuhu | Carlaw Park 2 |
| 3:00 | Try: Ellis Friend 2, C Stevens, Lou Hutt; Con: Frank Delgrosso 3 Pen: Frank Delgrosso | | Try: Stan Webb 2, Leslie Oliff; Con: Drew; Pen: F Chapman, Unknown x 1 Drop: J Hemingway | Referee: Arthur Rae |

| 11 July | Marist | 17–9 | Newton | Western Springs |
| 3:00 | Try: Alan Clarke, Pat Meehan, George Batchelor; Con: Alan Clarke 2, Pat Meehan; Drop: Norm Campbell | | Try: Samuel Harris, A Pope, Ted Brimble | Referee: Vic Simpson |

==== Round 11 ====
Stanley Francis, the Newton captain played his final game for Newton before a transfer to Wellington for work. It was intended that his team mate Ronald Kirkup fly him to Wellington as he was a qualified pilot and a pupil of the Auckland Aero Club but due to the "squally" weather conditions they were unable to fly. Instead Francis had to travel by the Limited express on the Monday evening. Newton's match against Ponsonby was played at Stafford Park in Northcote, the home ground of the Northcote and Birkenhead Ramblers who had teams in the lower grades. There was a large attendance to witness the match with proceeds going towards the local Ex-Servicemen's Association. In City's match with Marist they tried C Reynolds at fullback and Puti Tipene Watene on the wing, but neither was at home there and they switched places too late to make a difference. Watene did manage to score a try though and kick a conversion and penalty. Marist saw winger Pat Meehan score three tries on the wing in their 8 point win.

| 18 July | Marist | 18–10 | City | Carlaw Park 1 |
| 3:00 | Try: Pat Meehan 3, Norm Campbell; Con: Alan Clarke 3 | | Try: Puti Tipene Watene, Alderton; Con: Puti Tipene Watene; Pen: Puti Tipene Watene | Referee: Vic Simpson |

| 18 July | Richmond | 32–3 | Ellerslie-Otahuhu | Carlaw Park 2 |
| 3:00 | Try: Charles Dunn 2, Ritchie, Ted Mincham, Stan Prentice 4, N Pell, Unknown x 1 Con: Charles Dunn | | Try: Leslie Oliff | Referee: E McCall |

| 18 July | Ponsonby | 12–7 | Newton | Stafford Park, Northcote |
| 3:00 | Try: Walter Goodwin, Leonard Riley; Con: Frank Delgrosso 2 Pen: Frank Delgrosso | | Try: Hill; Con: Arnold Porteous; Pen: Arnold Porteous | Referee: Les Bull |

==== Round 12 ====
The Round 12 match at Devonport between the hosts and Ellerslie-Otahuhu was one with paid entry after permission was granted by the Devonport Borough Council. A sum of £12 5/ was raised to assist the Devonport Welfare League's funds. Unofficially the Devonport v Ellerslie-Otahuhu match was referee Les Bull's 100th time officiating an Auckland senior club team match. He was the first referee to achieve this in Auckland Rugby League. Robert Alderton, the City halfback was kicked on the arm and dislocated his elbow. He managed to finish the last 20 minutes of the match however. Richmond fullback Merv Lee returned from his broken collar-bone but was said to have played without confidence.

| 25 July | Ponsonby | 18–7 | City | Carlaw Park 1 |
| 3:00 | Try: Victor Fagan, Lou Hutt, Ellis Friend, Doug McLeay; Con: Frank Delgrosso 3 | | Try: Laurie Barchard; Con: Steve Watene; Pen: Steve Watene | Referee: Frank Thompson |

| 25 July | Richmond | 8–0 | Newton | Carlaw Park 2 |
| 3:00 | Try: W Ritchie, Bill Telford; Con: Ted Mincham | | | Referee: A.E. Smith |

| 25 July | Devonport | 12–6 | Ellerslie-Otahuhu | Devonport Domain |
| 3:00 | Try: Dick Smith, Len Scott, R O'Donnell, J Harding | | Try: Reginald Keesing, A Hickey | Referee: Les Bull |

==== Round 13 ====
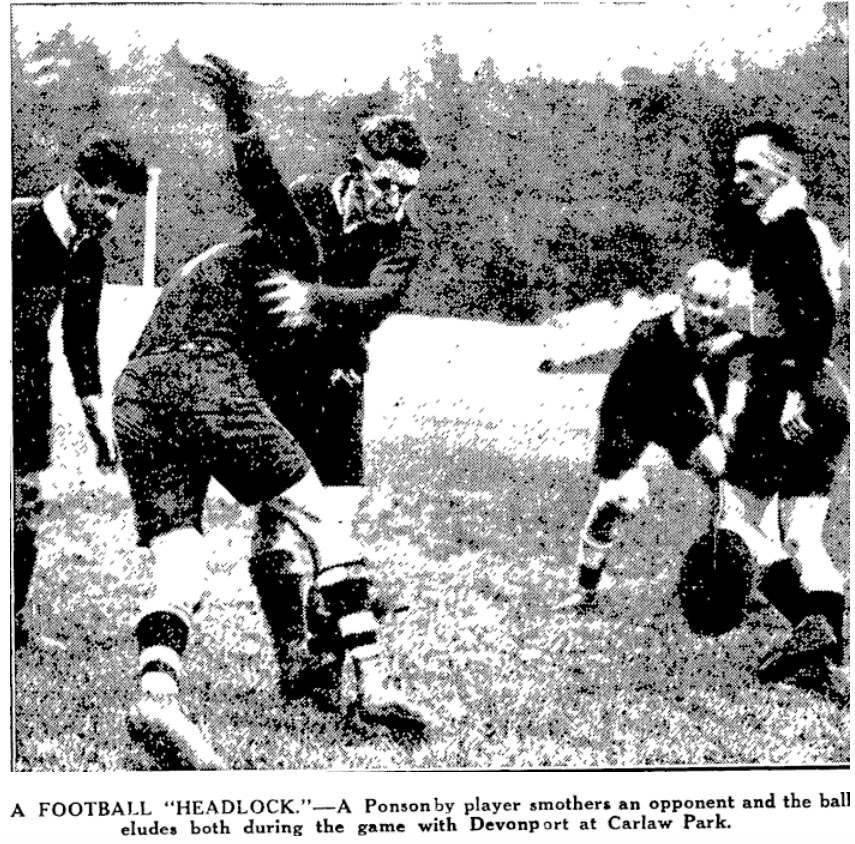

The Round 13 matches were played in terrible conditions which saw the cancellation of almost all league in Auckland. The match between Marist and Ellerslie-Otahuhu played at Papatoetoe was abandoned at halftime due to the north-westerly squalls making playing conditions impossible. The score of 21–3 in favour of Marist was declared the final score. City was severely understrength with 5 of its regular players absent. The match played on the number 2 field at Carlaw Park had pools of water on the field and the Auckland Star reported that a group of young women watching had to take refuge in the time keepers and press box where they "barracked" the whole match. While in the Ponsonby-Devonport match Lou Hutt of Ponsonby was ordered off near the end of the match.

| 1 August | Devonport | 13–0 | Ponsonby | Carlaw Park 1 |
| 3:00 | Try: Dick Smith, Allan Seagar, Ernest Ruby; Con: Dick Smith; Pen: Dick Smith | | | Referee: Percy Rogers |

| 1 August | Newton | 23–10 | City | Carlaw Park 2 |
| 3:00 | Try: Ferguson, Ray Middleton, A Pope, Ed St George 2 Con: Ray Middleton 2, Arnold Porteous; Pen: Ray Middleton | | Try: William McLaughlin, Len Barchard; Con: Laurie Barchard 2 | Referee: Wilfred Simpson |

| 1 August | Marist | 21–3 | Ellerslie-Otahuhu | Papatoetoe |
| 3:00 | Try: Pat Young, Charles Gregory, Alan Clarke, Claude List, George Batchelor; Con: Charles Gregory 3 | | Try: A Hickey | Referee: Vic Simpson |

==== Round 14 ====
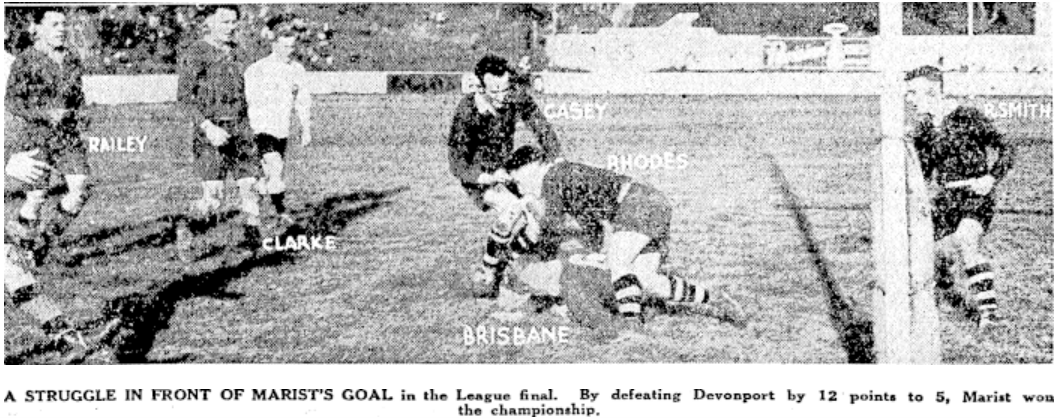
Hec Brisbane being tackled by C. Rhodes and S. Casey of Devonport. Brisbane's team mate Alan Clarke looming in support to the left with Ike Railey, while Dick Smith of Devonport is to the right of the posts

With Marist's 12–5 win over Devonport they secured the championship for Marist. The match was essentially a final with both teams tied on 20 competition points. Marist's only other championship win to this point came in 1924. All of Marist's points came from tries with wingers Pat Meehan and George Batchelor scoring two tries each while Devonport's came from a try to hooker P. Masefield and a penalty to prop Alf Scott. Scott was in his final full season for North Shore and had represented Auckland at rugby league and also cricket as a wicket keeper. His younger brother was Verdun Scott who would also go on to represent Auckland and New Zealand as a wicket keeper as well as representing New Zealand on their 1939 rugby league tour of England.

| 8 August | Marist | 12–5 | Devonport | Carlaw Park 1 |
| 3:00 | Try: Pat Meehan 2, George Batchelor 2 | | Try: P Masefield; Pen: Alf Scott | Referee: Les Bull |

| 8 August | Richmond | 14–5 | Ponsonby | Carlaw Park 2 |
| 3:00 | Try: Ted Mincham, George Davis, N Pell, Blood; Con: Ted Mincham | | Try: Pat Skelton; Pen: Frank Delgrosso | Referee: E McCall |

| 8 August | Ellerslie-Otahuhu | 14–10 | City | Ellerslie Domain |
| 3:00 | Try: A Hobbs, Aiden Hickey, Stan Webb, Drew; Con: Boswell | | Try: Len Barchard, William McLaughlin; Con: Steve Watene 2 | Referee: Stuart Billman |

=== Roope Rooster knockout competition ===
==== Round 1 ====
| 29 August | Ponsonby | 24–12 | City | Carlaw Park 1 |
| 3:15 | Try: Lou Hutt 2, L Winters, Doug McLeay 2, C Stevens; Con: Frank Delgrosso 3 | | Try: Len Barchard, Laurie Barchard, William McLaughlin, J Iveson | Referee: Bertie Victor Emirali |

| 29 August | Devonport | 41–8 | Newton | Carlaw Park 2 |
| 3:00 | Try: Dick Smith 2, Len Scott 4, J Hawkes 3, C Rhodes 2 Con: Dick Smith, J Harding, S Casey, Unknown x 1 | | Try: Allen 2 Con: Ray Middleton | Referee: E McCall |

| 29 August | Richmond | 15–11 | Ellerslie-Otahuhu | Carlaw Park 1 |
| 1:45 | Try: Stan Prentice, Charles Dunn, Arthur Lennie; Con: Ted Mincham 2 Pen: Ted Mincham | | Try: Glenn; Pen: Stan Webb 4 | Referee: Wilfred Simpson |

==== Semi finals ====
The semi finals were postponed initially due to poor weather before being played on 12 September. The match between Ponsonby and Richmond went to extra-time after it was 20–20 at the end of regular time. This was very rare as usually tied games were replayed. Ponsonby went on to win 28–20.

| 12 September | Devonport | 11–8 | Marist | Carlaw Park 1 |
| 3:15 | Try: J Harding, P Masefield, Len Scott; Drop: Dick Smith | | Try: Gordon Campbell, McDonald; Con: Alan Clarke | Referee: E McCall |

| 12 September | Ponsonby | 28–20 (20–20) | Richmond | Carlaw Park 2 |
| 3:15 | Try: L Winters, Heck Lunn 2, Pat Skelton 2, C Stevens; Con: Frank Delgrosso 3 Pen: Frank Delgrosso; Drop: Frank Delgrosso | | Try: Ted Mincham, Charles Dunn 2, George Davis; Con: Ted Mincham 2 Pen: Ted Mincham 2 | Referee: Percy Rogers |

==== Final ====
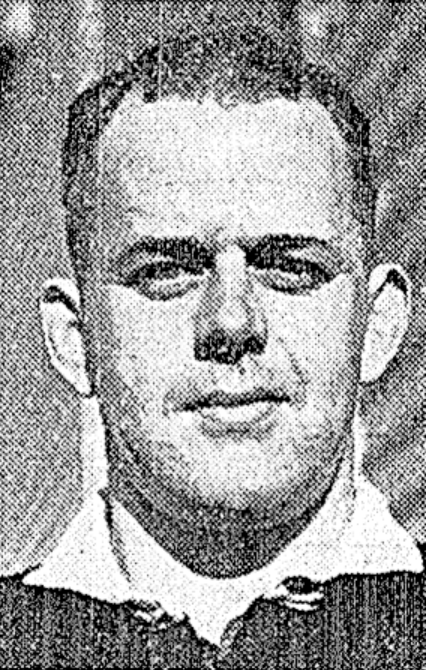
Bert Leatherbarrow

Twenty two year old hooker Bert Leatherbarrow debuted for North Shore. He had been born in England in 1909 but moved with his family as a child to Auckland. He would go on to play for North Shore seniors from 1931 to 1934 before transferring to Ponsonby in 1935 and then to Mount Albert in 1937 where he played over 100 games and was selected for the 1939 New Zealand tour of England at the age of 30. In 1943 he switched to City Rovers where he won a championship with them in 1944, the fourth of his career with three different clubs. He scored a try in Devonport's Roope Rooster win which was the second time they had won the trophy after a 15–10 win over Newton in 1915, the first season the trophy had been competed for. Future New Zealand international Dick Smith and current international Allan Seagar also scored tries for the winners.

| 19 September | Devonport | 34–17 | Ponsonby | Carlaw Park 1 |
| 3:15 | Try: S Casey, Bert Leatherbarrow, Ernest Ruby, Dick Smith 2, Allan Seagar 2, P Masefield; Con: Dick Smith 4 Pen: Dick Smith | | Try: Horatio Drew, Leonard Riley, George Gardiner; Con: Frank Delgrosso 2 Pen: Frank Delgrosso 2 | Referee: Percy Rogers |

=== Stormont Shield ===
| 3 October | Devonport | 25–6 | Marist | Carlaw Park 1 |
| 3:00 | Try: Allan Seagar 2, Dick Smith 2, Hugh Simpson; Con: Allan Seagar 4 Pen: Allan Seagar | | Try: Pat Meehan 2 | Referee: Vic Simpson |

=== Top try scorers and point scorers ===
Top try and point scorers for A Grade, Roope Rooster matches and the Stormont Shield match. Frank Delgrosso of Ponsonby was the top point scorer for the 3rd time in his career with 70 points. He was regularly in the top 5 point scorers in the first grade competitions and to this point in his career had amassed more than any other player, with over 650 points. Len Scott (Devonport) was the top try scorer with 12, closely followed by George Batchelor (Marist) and Pat Meehan with 11, and Stan Prentice (Richmond) with 10.

Top try scorers
| Rk | Player | Team | Games | Tries |
|---|---|---|---|---|
| 1 | Len Scott | Devonport | 15 | 12 |
| 2= | George Batchelor | Marist | 15 | 11 |
| 2= | Pat Meehan | Marist | 8 | 11 |
| 4 | Stan Prentice | Richmond | 14 | 10 |
| 5 | Dick Smith | Devonport | 8 | 9 |
| 6= | Ellis Friend | Ponsonby | 10 | 7 |
| 6= | Allan Seagar | Devonport | 16 | 7 |
| 8= | Hec Brisbane | Marist | 15 | 6 |
| 8= | Laurie Barchard | City | 12 | 6 |
| 8= | Claude List | Marist | 13 | 6 |
| 8= | Doug McLeay | Ponsonby | 11 | 6 |
| 8= | Ernest Ruby | Devonport | 13 | 6 |
| 8= | William McLaughlin | City | 12 | 6 |

Top point scorers
| Rk | Player | Team | G | T | C | P | DG | Pts |
|---|---|---|---|---|---|---|---|---|
| 1 | Frank Delgrosso | Ponsonby | 13 | 0 | 22 | 12 | 1 | 70 |
| 2= | Pat Meehan | Marist | 8 | 11 | 8 | 0 | 0 | 49 |
| 2= | Allan Seagar | Devonport | 16 | 7 | 12 | 2 | 0 | 49 |
| 4 | Dick Smith | Devonport | 8 | 9 | 6 | 2 | 1 | 45 |
| 5 | George Davis | Richmond | 12 | 4 | 12 | 3 | 0 | 42 |
| 6 | Puti Tipene (Steve) Watene | City | 10 | 1 | 9 | 10 | 0 | 41 |
| 7 | Ted Mincham | Richmond | 9 | 5 | 7 | 5 | 0 | 39 |
| 8 | George Batchelor | Marist | 15 | 11 | 2 | 0 | 0 | 37 |
| 9 | Len Scott | Devonport | 15 | 12 | 0 | 0 | 0 | 36 |
| 10 | Stan Prentice | Richmond | 14 | 10 | 0 | 0 | 0 | 30 |

=== Senior reserve grade standings ===
The standings include the 'final' between Devonport and Ponsonby which was a 5–5 draw. This meant Devonport won the title as they finished the competition with one more point that Ponsonby. A Round 11 result between Marist and City is unknown as it was not reported in the newspapers while the score between Devonport and Ellerslie-Otahuhu in Round 12 is also unknown, though Devonport were the victor.

| Team | Pld | W | D | L | F | A | Pts |
|---|---|---|---|---|---|---|---|
| Devonport United Reserves | 12 | 9 | 2 | 1 | 149 | 48 | 20 |
| Ponsonby United Reserves | 12 | 9 | 1 | 2 | 163 | 63 | 19 |
| Richmond Rovers Reserves | 12 | 9 | 0 | 3 | 147 | 74 | 18 |
| Marist Old Boys Reserves | 10 | 5 | 1 | 4 | 118 | 47 | 11 |
| City Rovers Reserves | 10 | 2 | 0 | 8 | 58 | 110 | 4 |
| Ellerslie-Otahuhu United Reserves | 11 | 2 | 0 | 9 | 41 | 142 | 4 |
| Newton Rangers Reserves | 11 | 1 | 0 | 10 | 27 | 219 | 2 |

=== Senior reserve grade fixtures ===
The Round 13 matches at Carlaw Park were cancelled due to the poor weather conditions and the necessity to protect the ground for the Senior matches to follow immediately afterwards.

1931 Senior Reserve results
| | Date | | Score | | Score | Venue |
| Round 1 | 2 May | Devonport | 21 | City | 5 | Carlaw Park # 1, 1:45pm |
| – | 2 May | Richmond | 8 | Marist | 6 | Carlaw Park # 2, 1:45pm |
| – | 2 May | Ellerslie-Otahuhu | 10 | Newton | 5 | Ellerslie, 1:45pm |
| Round 2 | 9 May | Ponsonby | 13 | Marist | 5 | Domain # 5, 1:45pm |
| – | 9 May | Richmond | 16 | City | 11 | ? |
| – | 9 May | Devonport | 39 | Newton | 0 | Devonport Domain, 3pm |
| Round 3 | 16 May | Ponsonby | 8 | City | 4 | Carlaw Park # 1, 1:45pm |
| – | 16 May | Devonport | 14 | Ellerslie-Otahuhu | 2 | Carlaw Park # 2, 1:45pm |
| – | 16 May | Richmond | 32 | Newton | 0 | Western Springs Stadium, 1:45pm |
| Round 4 | 23 May | Marist | 21 | City | 2 | Carlaw Park # 1, 1:45pm |
| – | 23 May | Richmond | 19 | Ellerslie-Otahuhu | 6 | Carlaw Park # 2, 1:45pm |
| – | 23 May | Ponsonby | 38 | Newton | 3 | Western Springs Stadium, 1:45pm |
| Round 5 | 30 May | Devonport | 21 | Richmond | 0 | Carlaw Park # 1, 1:45pm |
| – | 30 May | Marist | 32 | Newton | 0 | Carlaw Park # 2, 1:45pm |
| – | 30 May | Ellerslie-Otahuhu | 3 | Ponsonby | 14 | Ellerslie, 1:45pm |
| Round 6 | 13 June | Devonport | 12 | Ponsonby | 8 | Carlaw Park # 1, 1:45pm |
| – | 13 June | City | 10 | Newton | 3 | Western Springs, 1:45pm |
| – | 13 June | Marist | 14 | Ellerslie-Otahuhu | 3 | Carlaw Park # 2, 1:45pm |
| Round 7 | 20 June | Devonport | 10 | Marist | 6 | Carlaw Park # 1, 1:45pm |
| – | 20 June | Richmond | 15 | Ponsonby | 10 | Carlaw Park # 2, 1:45pm |
| – | 20 June | City | 16 | Ellerslie-Otahuhu | 0 | Auckland Domain # 1, 1:45pm |
| Round 8 | 27 June | Devonport | 15 | City | 0 | Carlaw Park # 1, 2pm |
| – | 27 June | Newton | 16 | Ellerslie-Otahuhu | 12 | Carlaw Park # 2, 2pm |
| – | 27 June | Marist | 5 | Richmond | 0 | Western Springs Stadium, 2pm |
| Round 9 | 4 July | Ponsonby | 8 | Marist | 5 | Carlaw Park # 1, 1:45pm |
| – | 4 July | Richmond | 13 | City | 7 | Carlaw Park # 2, 1:45pm |
| – | 4 July | Devonport | 9 | Newton | 0 | Devonport, 1:45pm |
| Round 10 | 11 July | Richmond | 19 | Devonport | 0 | Carlaw Park # 1, 1:45pm |
| – | 11 July | Ponsonby | 34 | Ellerslie-Otahuhu | 3 | Carlaw Park # 2, 1:45pm |
| – | 11 July | Marist | 21 | Newton | 0 | Western Springs, 1:45pm |
| Round 11 | 18 July | Marist | ? | City | ? | Carlaw Park # 1, 1:45pm |
| – | 18 July | Richmond | 10 | Ellerslie-Otahuhu | 2 | Carlaw Park # 2, 1:45pm |
| – | 18 July | Ponsonby | 6 | Newton | 0 | Northcote, 2pm |
| Round 12 | 25 July | Ponsonby | 13 | City | 3 | Carlaw Park # 1, 1:45pm |
| – | 25 July | Richmond | 10 | Newton | 0 | Carlaw Park #2, 1:45pm |
| – | 25 July | Devonport | W | Ellerslie-Otahuhu | L | Devonport Domain, 1:45pm |
| Round 13 | 1 Aug | Devonport | CCD | Ponsonby | CCD | Carlaw Park # 1, 1:45pm |
| – | 1 Aug | City | CCD | Newton | CCD | Carlaw Park # 2, 1:45pm |
| – | 1 Aug | Marist | CCD | Ellerslie-Otahuhu | CCD | Papatoetoe, 1:45pm |
| Round 14 | 8 Aug | Marist | 3 | Devonport | 3 | Carlaw Park # 1, 1:45pm |
| – | 8 Aug | Ponsonby | 6 | Richmond | 5 | Carlaw Park # 2, 1:45pm |
| – | 8 Aug | Ellerslie-Otahuhu | WBD | City | LBD | Ellerslie Racecourse, 1:45pm |
| Final | 15 Aug | Devonport | 5 | Ponsonby | 5 | Carlaw Park #1, 1:45pm |

=== Reserve grade knockout competition (Stallard Cup) ===
1931 Results
| | Date | | Score | | Score | Venue |
| Round 1 | 5 Sep | Ponsonby | 31 | City | 2 | Carlaw Park # 2, 1:45pm |
| – | 5 Sep | Newton | 9 | Devonport | 3 | Auckland Domain, 1:45pm |
| – | 5 Sep | Ellerslie-Otahuhu | L | Richmond | W | Auckland Domain, 3pm |
| semi final | 12 Sep | Newton | 18 | Marist | 15 | Carlaw Park # 2, 1:45pm |
| semi final | 12 Sep | Richmond | 15 | Ponsonby | 5 | Carlaw Park # 1, 3:15pm |
| Final | 19 Sep | Richmond | 13 | Newton | 5 | Carlaw Park # 1, 1:45pm |

=== Charity day tournament and death of a player (Samuel Harris) ===
On 31 October a Charity Day was held at Carlaw Park. It featured a Seven-A-Side tournament, an 'old timers' match, a match between the referees and St Johns Ambulance, and several running races. The proceeds would all go to the St John Ambulance Brigade. Mr. Samuel Harris of the Newton team collapsed and died from heart failure a few minutes from time in the final. Harris had played for the Newton seniors after joining the club in 1930 and had scored a try in a match earlier in the season. He had played in their earlier matches and had participated in a running race but had complained of feeling too unwell to run again. He collapsed while running with the ball and despite immediate attention from members of St, John Ambulance he died almost immediately. The match was called off. Harris had joined Newton in 1930 and was originally from Hikurangi. His funeral was held in Hikurangi on 4 November.

1931 Charity seven-a-side tournament results
| | Date | | Score | | Score | Venue |
| Round 1 | 31 Oct | Ellerslie-Otahuhu A | 21 | Ellerslie-Otahuhu B | 6 | Carlaw Park # 2, 1:30pm |
| Round 1 | 31 Oct | Richmond | WBD | Marist | LBD | Carlaw Park # 2, 2pm |
| Round 1 | 31 Oct | Ponsonby | 15 | Newton B | 5 | Carlaw Park # 2, 2pm |
| Round 1 | 31 Oct | Newton A | 13 | City | 0 | Carlaw Park # 1, 2:25pm |
| Round 1 | 31 Oct | Devonport | 38 | Ellerslie-Otahuhu A | 2 | Carlaw Park # 2, 2:25pm |
| semi-final | 31 Oct | Newton A | 19 | Ponsonby | 5 | Carlaw Park # 1, 4:30pm |
| semi-final | 31 Oct | Devonport | 16 | Richmond | 0 | Carlaw Park # 1, 4:30pm |
| Final | 31 Oct | Devonport | no result | Newton A | no result | Carlaw Park # 1, 4:30pm |

== Other club matches and lower grades ==
=== Lower grade competitions ===
The Mid-Week competition which was running once again was made up of nine teams. It was decided to allocate the Monteith Shield to the championship. This had formerly been awarded to the winner of the Senior grade champions, but as of this year the newly presented Fox Memorial Shield would replace it. The Waitemata (Endean) Shield would be awarded to the team scoring the most championship points in the second round, and the "Nuko" Cup to the winner of the two lower teams on the ladder. Marist were awarded the Davis Shield for scoring the most competition points in the junior grades.

==== Second grade ====
Point Chevalier won the second grade championship for the first time. They were closely followed all season by Mount Albert and Papakura. Papakura were the only side with all of their results reported so the for and against and win/loss records are slightly incomplete. Papakura won the knockout competition on September 12 when they beat Mount Albert 26–0 in the final. Mount Albert had defeated Point Chevalier in one semi final while Papakura beat Northcote 8–5 in the other. On July 18 the City side played Huntly and won 5–3 while on August 15 Point Chevalier beat a Riverhead side 11–6 at Hobsonville. On August 22 Papakura played a South Auckland (Waikato) side and won 8–3. Then at the end of the season a second grade representative side played the Wednesday Competition representatives and lost 23–6. The second grade representative side was called 'Auckland Juniors'. On October 17 they also played the Devonport reserve grade side who had won the championship and won 18 to 3. Ponsonby withdrew after 9 rounds having defaulted at least 2 of their matches.

| Team | Pld | W | D | L | F | A | Pts |
|---|---|---|---|---|---|---|---|
| Point Chevalier | 14 | 12 | 1 | 1 | 144 | 32 | 25 |
| Mount Albert United | 15 | 11 | 0 | 4 | 128 | 26 | 22 |
| Papakura | 15 | 10 | 1 | 4 | 107 | 83 | 21 |
| Northcote & Birkenhead Ramblers | 15 | 4 | 2 | 4 | 81 | 58 | 10 |
| Māngere United | 14 | 4 | 0 | 6 | 62 | 28 | 8 |
| Mount Wellington | 14 | 3 | 0 | 8 | 24 | 113 | 6 |
| City Rovers | 15 | 1 | 0 | 11 | 26 | 183 | 2 |
| Ponsonby United | 8 | 1 | 0 | 7 | 20 | 69 | 2 |

==== Third Grade Open standings ====
Marist Old Boys won the championship when they defeated Ponsonby United in the final on August 29 by 4 points to 2. It was Marist's first time winning this grade. Devonport defaulted their first two matches and then withdrew from the competition, while Ellerslie entered a side but withdrew after the first week with it unknown if the match was played or not. Glen Lynn played until round 12 before withdrawing. On May 30 when Marist had their bye they played a Waiterimu, a Waikato side, and won 3–2.

In the knockout competition Marist beat Devonport 8–0 in one semi final and Ponsonby beat Glenora 8–3 in the other. Glenora had recently formed and entered a team in the 3rd Grade Intermediate competition but decided to enter a team in the 3rd Grade Open knockout competition. They beat Richmond 3–0 to make the semi-final where they were beaten. Marist and Ponsonby drew 5–5 in the knockout final therefore a replay was needed. Ponsonby won the replay 8–2 on September 26.

| Team | Pld | W | D | L | F | A | Pts |
|---|---|---|---|---|---|---|---|
| Marist Old Boys | 13 | 7 | 1 | 1 | 119 | 30 | 15 |
| Ponsonby United | 15 | 6 | 1 | 2 | 76 | 32 | 13 |
| Richmond Rovers | 16 | 4 | 0 | 6 | 92 | 86 | 8 |
| Papatoetoe | 12 | 1 | 0 | 2 | 0 | 44 | 2 |
| Glen Lynn | 9 | 0 | 0 | 5 | 2 | 97 | 0 |
| Devonport United | 2 | 0 | 0 | 2 | 0 | 0 | 0 |

==== Third Intermediate Grade standings ====
Richmond Rovers won the 3rd grade intermediate championship for the 4th time in their history. It was only in the 6th year of competition. There were a large number of results not reported so the standings are very incomplete. The competition was notable because Glenora fielded their first ever side when they entered a team in round 6 on June 6. They lost the match to Akarana 16–0. In the knockout competition Richmond beat Mount Albert in one semi final while Akarana beat City 10–4 in the other semi final. Richmond then completed the double when they defeated Akarana 6–3 in the final on September 12. Glenora were knocked out in the first round on August 22 by Mount Albert 6–4 and then entered a side in the 3rd grade open knockout competition. Glen Lynn (an amalgamated club between Glen Eden and New Lynn) withdrew after 8 rounds.

| Team | Pld | W | D | L | F | A | Pts |
|---|---|---|---|---|---|---|---|
| Richmond Rovers | 15 | 10 | 0 | 3 | 109 | 50 | 20 |
| Akarana | 15 | 8 | 2 | 1 | 98 | 15 | 18 |
| Ponsonby United | 13 | 4 | 2 | 2 | 41 | 74 | 10 |
| Marist Old Boys | 14 | 5 | 1 | 4 | 82 | 35 | 11 |
| City Rovers | 13 | 2 | 0 | 4 | 30 | 36 | 4 |
| Mount Albert United | 16 | 1 | 1 | 6 | 16 | 80 | 3 |
| Glen Lynn | 6 | 0 | 0 | 6 | 7 | 45 | 0 |
| Glenora | 7 | 0 | 0 | 5 | 0 | 48 | 0 |

==== Fourth Grade standings ====
Marist won the championship and the knockout competition when they beat Richmond 13–0 on October 10. It was the first time they had won the fourth grade competition in its 20th year of running.

Glen Lynn entered a team but did not play a game before withdrawing. Ellerslie defaulted their first two matches and then withdrew. Mount Wellington withdrew after 3 rounds despite winning in round one and a default win over Ponsonby in round 3. Ponsonby withdrew after defaulting in the third round while Avondale withdrew after 14 rounds.

| Team | Pld | W | D | L | F | A | Pts |
|---|---|---|---|---|---|---|---|
| Marist Old Boys | 24 | 10 | 1 | 1 | 215 | 52 | 21 |
| Akarana | 22 | 10 | 1 | 3 | 97 | 71 | 21 |
| Newmarket | 20 | 6 | 4 | 4 | 84 | 61 | 16 |
| Point Chevalier | 21 | 6 | 3 | 4 | 117 | 84 | 15 |
| Northcote & Birkenhead Ramblers | 21 | 6 | 1 | 0 | 101 | 25 | 13 |
| Richmond Rovers | 21 | 6 | 1 | 4 | 57 | 49 | 13 |
| Papakura | 19 | 6 | 1 | 9 | 76 | 143 | 13 |
| City Rovers | 20 | 4 | 1 | 8 | 105 | 133 | 9 |
| Mount Albert United | 19 | 3 | 2 | 6 | 39 | 66 | 8 |
| Devonport United | 20 | 1 | 2 | 5 | 47 | 82 | 4 |
| Mount Wellington | 3 | 2 | 0 | 0 | 19 | 0 | 4 |
| Papatoetoe | 19 | 1 | 0 | 9 | 42 | 146 | 2 |
| Avondale | 13 | 1 | 0 | 7 | 17 | 104 | 2 |
| Ponsonby United | 3 | 0 | 0 | 1 | 0 | 0 | 0 |
| Ellerslie United | 2 | 0 | 0 | 2 | 0 | 0 | 0 |

==== Fifth Grade standings ====
Marist won the championship for the fifth grade for the second time with the previous being the year prior in 1930. They also won the knockout competition when they beat City in the final 6–3 on October 3. Marist had beaten Ponsonby in one semi final while City beat Devonport in the other. There were a significant number of scores not reported so the standings are incomplete.

Papatoetoe and Newmarket both entered teams but neither had a result reported and Newmarket withdrew after round 1 and Papatoetoe after round 2. Mount Albert withdrew after 17 rounds near the end of the championship, with Ellerslie withdrawing a week later.

| Team | Pld | W | D | L | F | A | Pts |
|---|---|---|---|---|---|---|---|
| Marist Old Boys | 19 | 12 | 0 | 0 | 171 | 6 | 24 |
| Newton Rangers | 18 | 9 | 1 | 4 | 135 | 42 | 19 |
| City Rovers | 19 | 8 | 0 | 2 | 87 | 15 | 16 |
| Northcote & Birkenhead Ramblers | 18 | 7 | 0 | 3 | 89 | 15 | 14 |
| Ponsonby United | 15 | 4 | 1 | 4 | 55 | 66 | 9 |
| Glen Lynn | 20 | 3 | 0 | 5 | 61 | 59 | 6 |
| Devonport United | 16 | 3 | 0 | 4 | 16 | 53 | 6 |
| Richmond Rovers | 19 | 2 | 0 | 10 | 16 | 118 | 4 |
| Ellerslie United | 16 | 1 | 0 | 6 | 17 | 103 | 2 |
| Mount Albert United | 16 | 0 | 0 | 11 | 4 | 158 | 0 |

==== Sixth Grade standings ====
Newmarket won their first ever sixth grade championship when they defeated Richmond 3–2 in the final on September 26. They had won the schoolboys championship in 1928 and 1929 so may have included some of those players coming through the grades. Ellerslie withdrew after 3 rounds having defaulted their 2nd match and neither of their other results reported. Newmarket also won the knockout competition by the same score over the same opponent on October 17. Newmarket had beaten Marist on one semi final while Richmond beat City 14–6 in the other.

| Team | Pld | W | D | L | F | A | Pts |
|---|---|---|---|---|---|---|---|
| Newmarket | 18 | 16 | 0 | 1 | 165 | 13 | 32 |
| Richmond Rovers | 21 | 14 | 1 | 1 | 125 | 16 | 29 |
| Marist Old Boys A | 18 | 9 | 1 | 5 | 114 | 49 | 19 |
| City Rovers | 19 | 6 | 2 | 5 | 64 | 33 | 14 |
| Point Chevalier | 19 | 2 | 3 | 9 | 24 | 71 | 7 |
| Devonport United | 18 | 3 | 0 | 9 | 41 | 116 | 6 |
| Newton Rangers | 18 | 3 | 0 | 9 | 19 | 119 | 6 |
| Northcote & Birkenhead Ramblers | 17 | 2 | 1 | 6 | 0 | 13 | 5 |
| Akarana | 17 | 2 | 0 | 10 | 21 | 115 | 4 |
| Ellerslie United | 3 | 0 | 0 | 1 | 0 | 0 | 0 |

==== Seventh Grade standings ====
Richmond Rovers A won the seventh grade championship for the second consecutive year. It had been inaugurated in the 1930 season effectively replacing the Sixth grade B competition. Ellerslie were runners up but they had 5 results not reported, with Richmond A having a significant number of scores not reported either so the standings are incomplete. Richmond A also won the knockout competition when they beat Ellerslie 3–2 on September 12. Ellerslie beat City in one semi final and Richmond beat Point Chevalier in the other.

| Team | Pld | W | D | L | F | A | Pts |
|---|---|---|---|---|---|---|---|
| Richmond Rovers A | 16 | 14 | 1 | 1 | 170 | 15 | 29 |
| Ellerslie United | 16 | 10 | 1 | 0 | 206 | 5 | 21 |
| City Rovers | 15 | 4 | 2 | 3 | 33 | 42 | 10 |
| Point Chevalier | 16 | 4 | 1 | 5 | 36 | 96 | 9 |
| Papatoetoe | 15 | 3 | 2 | 4 | 82 | 51 | 8 |
| Newmarket | 15 | 2 | 1 | 7 | 25 | 120 | 5 |
| Glen Lynn | 15 | 1 | 0 | 7 | 26 | 95 | 2 |
| Richmond Rovers B | 14 | 0 | 0 | 11 | 3 | 157 | 0 |

==== Primary schools standings ====
There were a large number of results not reported and therefore the standings are significantly incomplete. It is unknown who won the championship. Richmond initially entered a B team as well but they had two fixtures organised but defaulted both games and withdrew. In the first round Newton beat Newmarket 5-3 but Newmarket appealed successfully to overturn the result as Newton had fielded a schoolboy from (Auckland) Grammar School.

On October 10 a schoolboy "City Representatives" side played a "Suburbs Representative" side with the City team winning 20 points to 9. Despite their respective team names the players were made up of players from all over Auckland and no specific geographic area. City included Johnston, Bennett, Filmer, Moore (Newmarket), Legge, Robertson, Bell (City), Zaninovitch (Newton), Sime, Moyle (Devonport), Duncan (Papatoetoe), Arthur McInnarney, Haynes (Ellerslie), Hall (Avondale), and Bauern (Richmond). The Suburbs team included Franklin, Stanaway (Newmarket), Stenberg, D. Gildard (Avondale), Beer (Ellerslie), Turner, Williams, Korsache (Richmond), Sullivan, McArthur, York (Devonport), Paltridge, Skinner (Northcote), Burgess (Newton), and Mullins (Papatoetoe).

| Team | Pld | W | D | L | F | A | Pts |
|---|---|---|---|---|---|---|---|
| Devonport Schools | 16 | 7 | 1 | 2 | 71 | 39 | 15 |
| Papatoetoe Schools | 15 | 7 | 0 | 1 | 81 | 14 | 14 |
| Richmond Schools A | 16 | 6 | 1 | 1 | 76 | 11 | 13 |
| Newmarket Primary School | 16 | 6 | 0 | 1 | 114 | 14 | 12 |
| Newton Schools | 17 | 4 | 2 | 5 | 40 | 96 | 10 |
| Parnell/Akarana Schools | 9 | 2 | 1 | 2 | 45 | 11 | 5 |
| Ellerslie Schools | 16 | 2 | 0 | 6 | 51 | 134 | 4 |
| City Schools | 14 | 1 | 1 | 6 | 39 | 44 | 3 |
| Avondale Schools | 13 | 1 | 0 | 4 | 14 | 68 | 2 |
| Northcote Schools | 17 | 1 | 0 | 7 | 20 | 112 | 2 |

==== Mid Week Competition standings (Monteith Shield) ====
The league was known as the Mid Week competition and also the Wednesday competition. The championship winners were awarded the Monteith Shield, with the Endean Shield to the team scoring the most championship points in the second round. Waterside Workers won the competition after Stonex and Stormont's defaulted to them in the final round. If they had played and lost then Auckland Locomotives would have had a chance to win the championship. George Gardiner played for the Waterside Workers side. The New Zealand Fertilisers side withdrew after 6 rounds while a Combined Taxis side entered the competition for the second round. No team was allowed to play more than three players who took part in Saturday football though it is unclear if that was only in the senior grades, and no team was allowed to field more than one representative player. On October 14 a combined City Markets and Combined Taxis side played in the knockout final against a Combined Boards and Nicholson Park team but the result was not reported. Two weeks prior they had defeated Auckland Locomotives and Waterside Workers in the semi-finals respectively.

During the season City Markets was thrown out of the competition for fielding an unregistered player but was readmitted after assurances that they would follow the rules in the future. On August 26 the match between Waterside Workers and Stonex and Stormont's was abandoned with minutes to go with the Waterside team leading 8–5. Spectators had encroached on the field at Victoria Park and the referee was unable to clear them and so called the game off with a replay later required. The games attracted large crowds, particularly the ones at Victoria Park which often drew thousands of interested onlookers. The ground was particularly close to the waterfront where most of the Waterside Workers would have been employed. The two bottom teams played off on September 30 for the "Nuks" Cup with Ellerslie Town Board Rovers beating Nicholson Park 8 to 3.

On October 10 a Midweek representative team played the Taupiri seniors in Taupiri and won 24–12. They also played the Auckland Juniors and won 23 to 6.

| Team | Pld | W | D | L | F | A | Pts |
|---|---|---|---|---|---|---|---|
| Waterside Workers | 14 | 11 | 1 | 1 | 108 | 49 | 23 |
| Auckland Locomotives (Railway) | 12 | 10 | 1 | 1 | 118 | 42 | 21 |
| City Markets | 12 | 6 | 1 | 3 | 99 | 73 | 13 |
| Stonex and Stormont's | 11 | 4 | 2 | 4 | 64 | 61 | 10 |
| Ellerslie Town Board Rovers | 12 | 3 | 0 | 8 | 48 | 94 | 6 |
| Nicholson Park (Mt Eden) | 15 | 2 | 2 | 9 | 45 | 82 | 6 |
| New Zealand Fertilisers | 6 | 1 | 1 | 3 | 14 | 37 | 3 |
| Combined Taxis | 6 | 1 | 0 | 4 | 16 | 27 | 2 |
| Post and Telegraph (Messengers) | 6 | 0 | 0 | 5 | 13 | 60 | 0 |

=== Other notable matches ===
==== Kia Ora (Huntly) v City ====
| 11 July | Kia Ora (Huntly) | 7-25 | City | Huntly Recreation Ground |
| 3:00 | Try: Johnson; Pen: Unknown x 2 | | Try: Ben Davidson, Unknown x 4 Con: Unknown x 4 Drop: Unknown x 1 | Referee: Harlock |

==== Wellington XIII v Marist ====
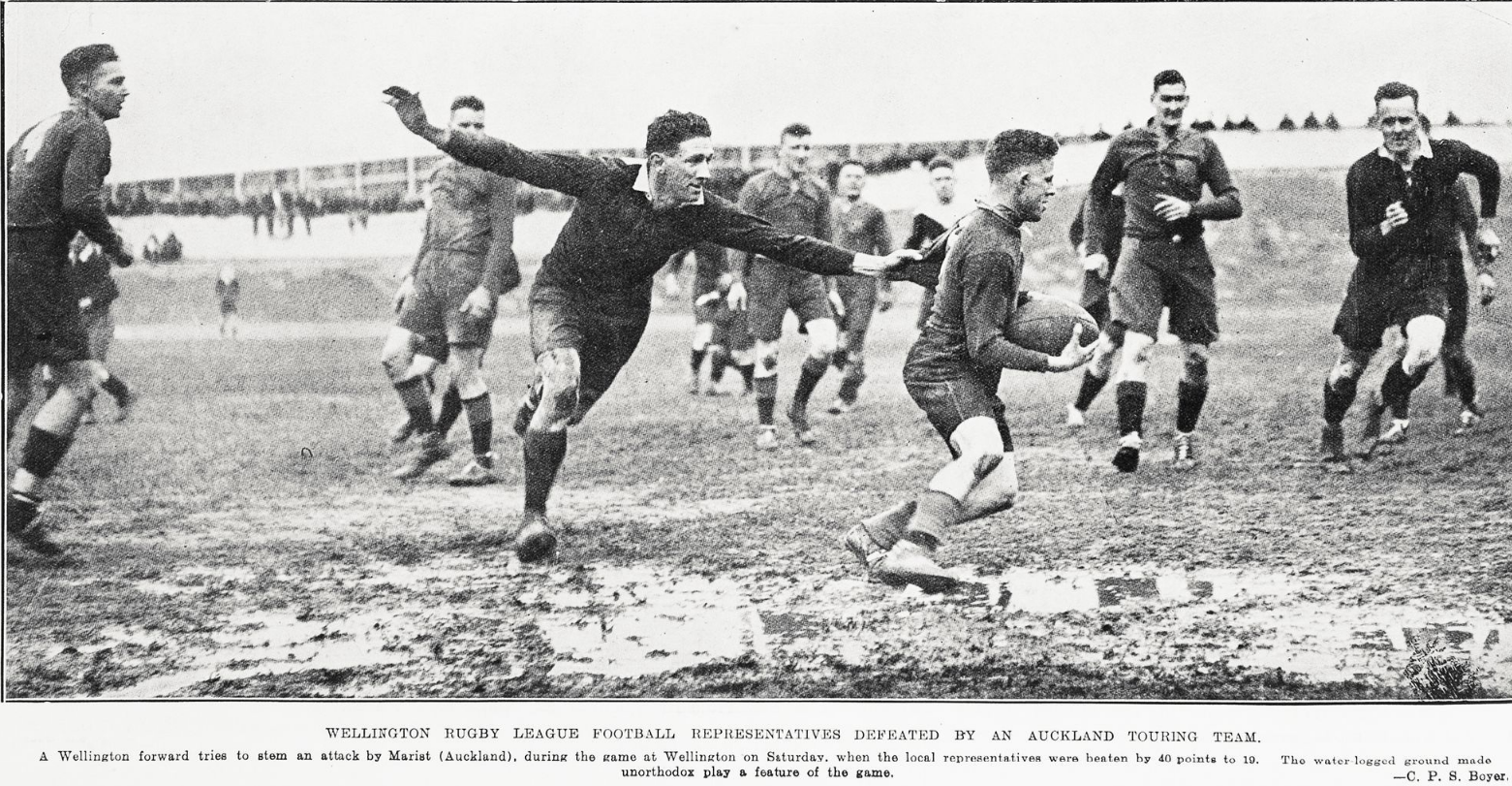
Action from the game which was played on a very wet field.

When Marist had a bye they travelled to Wellington to take on a Wellington XIII at the Winter Show Stadium, later known as Rugby League Park in the suburb of Newtown and now known as Newtown Park. Alan Clarke was unable to travel and was replaced by Jim Johnson in an otherwise near full strength team. Jim O'Brien accompanied the side as manager. Marist won comfortably scoring 12 tries to 5 but only managing to convert two of them. Pat Meehan and Pat Young both scored hat tricks, with George Batchelor scoring 2.

| 25 July | Wellington XIII | 19-40 | Marist | Newtown Park, Wellington |
| 3:00 | Try: Brace 2, Kelly, Davies, Ward; Con: Petherick, Kelly | | Try: George Batchelor 2, Claude List, Pat Meehan 3, Pat Young 3, Railey, C Young, Jim Johnson; Con: Gordon Campbell, Pat Young | Attendance: 1,000; Referee: P Childs |

==== City United (Whangarei XIII) v Richmond ====
Richmond travelled to Whangarei on their bye and was met by the City United side which featured players from other clubs. George Davis was injured early in the match and was replaced by Ray Lawless, as was W Jones who was replaced by Biddick. City United lock E O'Callaghan scored all three tries for them while for Richmond future New Zealand coach, Bill Telford scored one of their three tries.

| 1 August | City United (Whangarei XIII) | 11-13 | Richmond | Kensington Park, Whangarei |
| 3:00 | Try: E O'Callaghan 3 Con: C Hamilton | | Try: Reece Marshall, Bill Telford, W Ritchie; Con: George Davis; Pen: Merv Lee | Referee: J.F. Johnson |

==== Hamilton v Newton ====
| 8 August | Hamilton | 6-28 | Newton | Hinemoa Park, Hamilton |
| 3:00 | Try: McGreal, Unknown x 1 | | Try: Claude Dempsey, Hill 2, Samuel Harris 2, Pope 2, Ted Brimble; Con: Ray Middleton 2 | Referee: A Harlock |

==== Papakura (2nd Gr.) v South Auckland juniors ====
This match was the curtain raiser to the Northland v South Auckland representative game at Carlaw Park. After the scores were locked at 0–0 at halftime the Papakura team moved ahead through tries to Ivan Wilson and J Clarke, with W Francis converting Clarke's try. Evans, the South Auckland halfback scored late in the match.

| 22 August | Papakura (2nds) | 8-3 | South Auckland Juniors | Carlaw Park 1 |
| 1:45 | Try: Ivan Wilson, J Clarke; Con: W Francis | | Try: Evans | Referee: E McCall |

==== Newton v Hamilton ====
In the second half of the match the Newton halfback, Arnold Porteous was injured and left the field being replaced by "Muir". This was likely S. Muir, one of the Muir brothers in the Hamilton reserves.

| 22 August | Newton | 8-5 | Hamilton | Carlaw Park 2 |
| 1:45 | Try: Unknown x1, Eddleston; Pen: Ed St George | | Try: J Glasgow; Con: Stubbings |

==== Lower Waikato v Marist and Hamilton v Mt Albert 2nd Grade (Sunshine League Cup) ====
Marist who had just been crowned champions of Auckland travelled to Hamilton to play a very strong Lower Waikato side which featured six New Zealand representatives (George Tittleton, Edwin Abbott, James Jones, Joe Menzies, Wally Tittleton, and Tom Timms). The match was a double header to raise money for the Hospital Patients Sunshine League which provided funds for hospital patients in Hamilton. Marist trailed 0–8 at halftime but rallied with tries to George Batchelor (2), and Alan Clarke, with Clarke also kicking a conversion and Norm Campbell kicking a drop goal. In the curtain raiser between Hamilton and Mt Albert, J Glasgow (Hamilton) broke his arm and was taken to hospital, while Robinson (Hamilton) also left the field with concussion.

| 29 August | Lower Waikato | 11-13 | Marist | Steele Park, Hamilton |
| 3:00 | Try: Jack Whorskey, George Tittleton, M Scott; Con: Bert Jackways | | Try: George Batchelor 2, Alan Clarke; Con: Alan Clarke; Drop: Norm Campbell | Referee: A Harlock |

| 29 August | Hamilton | 5-6 | Mt Albert 2nd Gr. | Steele Park, Hamilton |
| 2:00 | Try: Cotter; Pen: S Muir | | Try: Eric Armishaw, Doug Mattson | Referee: E McCaw |

==== Ellerslie-Otahuhu v City (Whangarei) ====
The City club side from Whangarei traveled to Auckland to play Ellerslie-Otahuhu in Ellerslie. The match raised funds for the local unemployment fund. Brady scored first for the local side which gave them a 3–0 halftime lead but the City side scored two second half tries to win an uninspiring match.

| 5 September | Ellerslie-Otahuhu | 3-6 | City (Whangarei) | Ellerslie |
| 3:00 | Try: Brady | | Try: Crackett, Sirl | Referee: A Chapman |

==== Hikurangi v Auckland Watersiders ====
The Auckland Watersiders fielded a rugby league team at Hikurangi, north of Whangarei on September 5. The Hikurangi side was particularly strong with several Northland representative players. For the Watersiders they featured a handful of senior rugby league players in the Auckland competition including George Gardiner who played at centre and kicked two good conversions. The Northland team broke out to a 13–0 halftime lead and withstood a comeback to win by 9. The crowd was said to be "below the usual number" due to the industrial dispute.

| 5 September | Hikurangi | 19-10 | Auckland Watersiders | Hikurangi Recreation Ground |
| 3:00 | Try: Ted Cunningham 2, Rod Hamilton, Claude Hamilton, Dick Cunningham; Con: Claude Hamilton 2 | | Try: Robert Purdy 2 Con: George Gardiner | Referee: E.W. Taylor |

==== Huntly v Marist ====
| 19 September | Huntly | 19-10 | Marist | Huntly Recreation Ground |
| 3:00 | Try: Scott, Smith 2 | | Try: Gordon Campbell 2, Alan Clarke, McDonald; Con: Alan Clarke 3 Pen: Alan Clarke | Referee: E.W. Taylor |

==== Huntly v Marist ====
| 26 September | Hamilton | 13-8 | Richmond | Hinemoa Park, Hamilton |
| 3:00 | Try: Griffiths, H Welch 2 Con: S Muir, Stubbings | | Try: Davis, R Jones; Con: Mills | Referee: H.S. Morris |

==== Hamilton v Ponsonby ====
Hamilton travelled to Hamilton to Hinemoa Park and were thrashed 35–14. Hamilton led 23–0 at halftime and although Ponsonby improved their effort in the second half with Frank Delgrosso scoring twice they were still well beaten. For Hamilton their winger, Griffiths scored 4 tries while Cotter and Astle scored doubles.

| 3 October | Hamilton | 35-14 | Ponsonby | Hinemoa Park, Hamilton |
| 3:00 | Try: Griffiths 4, H Astle 2, H Welch, Cotter 2 Con: S Muir 3, Cotter | | Try: Norman Drew, Frank Delgrosso 2, Doug McLeay; Con: Pat Skelton | Referee: N Taylor |

List of Matches
| | Date | | Score | | Score | Venue | Referee |
| Exhibition | 18 July | Ngaruawahia | 6 | Devonport | 19 | | |
| Exhibition | 15 Aug | Riverhead | 6 | Point Chevalier 2nd Grade | 11 | Hobsonville | |
| Northern Union Cup | 22 Aug | South Auckland | 8 | North Auckland | 16 | Carlaw Park # 1, 3pm | |
| Exhibition | 29 Aug | Ngaruawahia Juniors | 8 | Northcote Fourth Grade | 16 | Ngaruawahia | |
| Representative | 17 Oct | Wednesday Representatives | 23 | Auckland Junior Representatives | 6 | Carlaw Park | |

== Representative season ==
It was a very quiet year on the representative team front. There was a match played between North Island and South Island, but the Auckland team's only match was against Northland. Auckland junior teams played two matches and a colts side played against the touring Eastern Suburbs team from Sydney who were the recently crowned premiers of the New South Wales Rugby League competition.

=== Representative fixtures ===
==== Inter island match ====
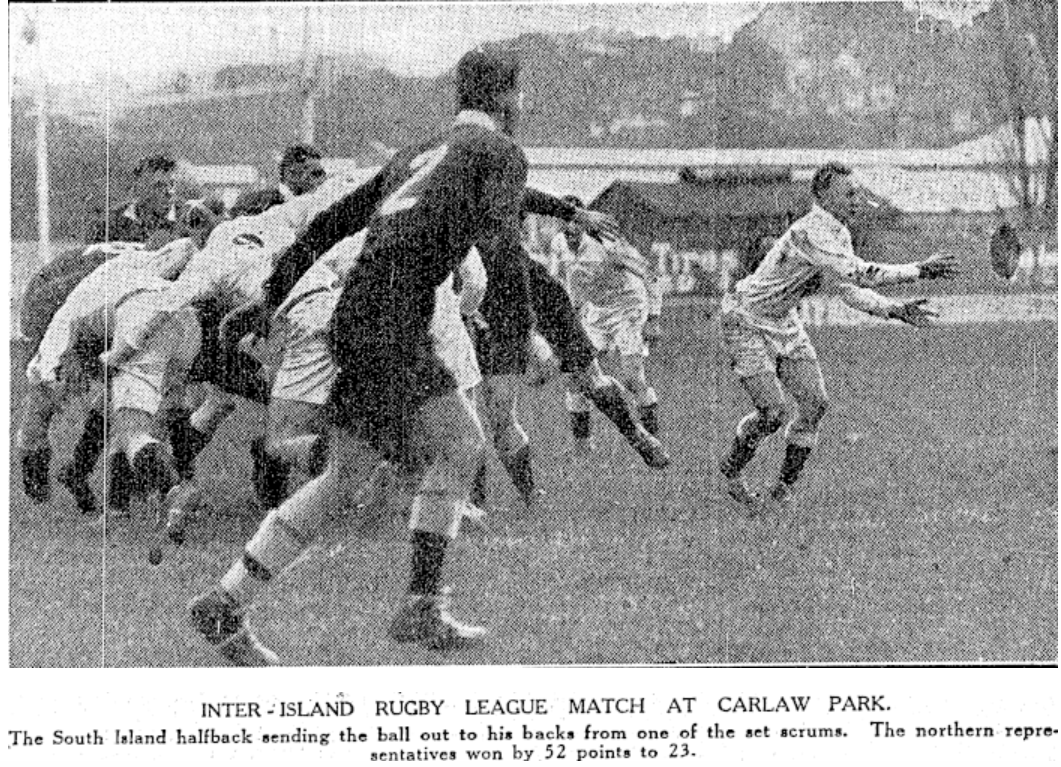

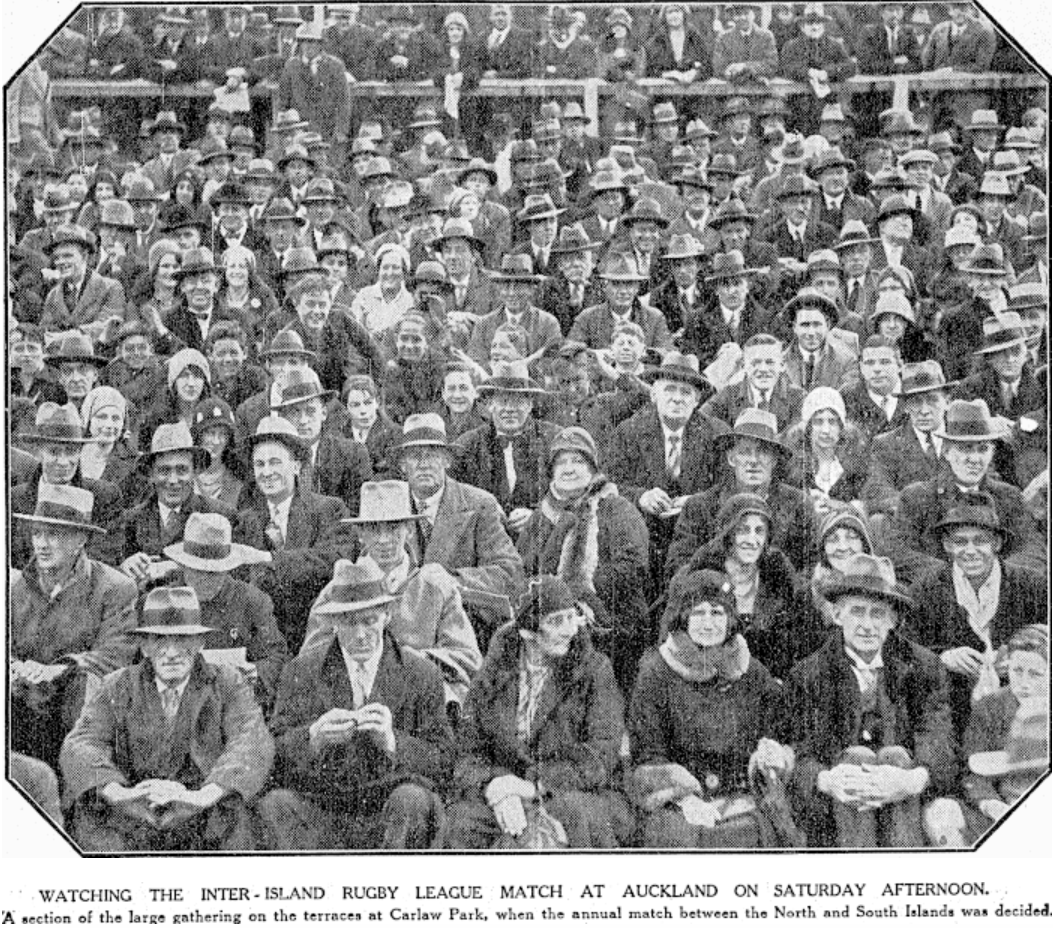

| 15 August | North Island | 52–23 | South Island | Carlaw Park 1 |
| 3:00 | Try: Pat Meehan 4, Claude List 3, Edwin Abbott 2, Hec Brisbane 2, Alan Clarke; Con: Pat Meehan, Claude List, Alan Clarke 5 Pen: Alan Clarke | | Try: Falgar 2, Jorgensen, Johnny Dodds, Jonas Masters; Con: Johnny Dodds | Referee: Les Bull |

==== Auckland v Northland ====
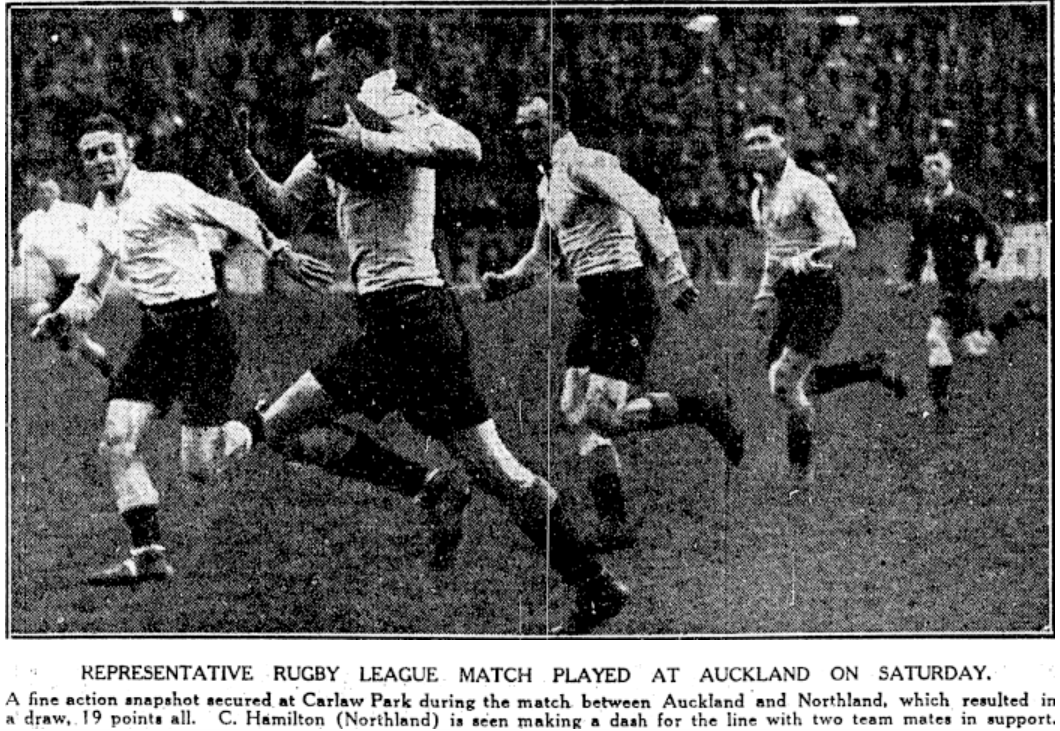

In a surprise result Northland had defeated South Auckland to lift the trophy. Auckland played Northland but the match was not for the Northern Union Shield and so they decided to play several young players including future Kiwi Albert Laing who had not yet even played a first grade match and could only manage a 19 all draw.

| 26 September | Auckland | 19–19 | Northland | Carlaw Park 1 |
| 3:15 | Try: Ted Mincham 2, Allan Seagar, Pat Meehan 2 Con: Ted Mincham, Allan Seagar | | Try: Ted Meyer, C Payne, Eddie O'Callaghan; Con: Rod Hamilton, C Hamilton 2 | Referee: Percy Rogers |

=== Auckland representative matches played and points scored ===
| No | Name | Club Team | Played | Tries | Con | Pen | Points |
|---|---|---|---|---|---|---|---|
| 1 | Ted Mincham | Richmond | 1 | 2 | 1 | 0 | 8 |
| 2 | Pat Meehan | Marist | 1 | 2 | 0 | 0 | 6 |
| 3 | Allan Seagar | Devonport | 1 | 1 | 1 | 0 | 5 |
| 4 | Dick Smith | Devonport | 1 | 0 | 0 | 0 | 0 |
| 4 | Albert Laing | Devonport | 1 | 0 | 0 | 0 | 0 |
| 4 | Wilf Hassan | Marist | 1 | 0 | 0 | 0 | 0 |
| 4 | James Everson | City | 1 | 0 | 0 | 0 | 0 |
| 4 | Heck Lunn | Ponsonby | 1 | 0 | 0 | 0 | 0 |
| 4 | Robert (Bob) Carter | Marist | 1 | 0 | 0 | 0 | 0 |
| 4 | Stan Clark | City | 1 | 0 | 0 | 0 | 0 |
| 4 | Norm Campbell | Marist | 1 | 0 | 0 | 0 | 0 |
| 4 | Ed St George | Newton | 1 | 0 | 0 | 0 | 0 |
| 4 | Ernest Ruby | Devonport | 1 | 0 | 0 | 0 | 0 |

== Annual general meetings and club news ==
- Auckland Rugby League held their annual general meeting in the Chamber of Commerce, Swanson Street on Thursday 16 April. At a later meeting they voted to adopt the motion whereby its grading of referees and appointments of them for matches would be done by a group of three, consisting of two of its members and a representative of the Auckland Rugby League. Tenders were requested for the lease of the Carlaw Park Refreshment Stall, and for the rights of the Rugby League Gazette.
- Auckland Rugby League Junior Management Committee held their annual meeting at the Grey Buildings on Tuesday, 31 March. After the reports were given by club delegates the prospect was for a record season in terms of team and player numbers. Mr. C. Adamson was elected chairman, with his deputy Mr. W. Lusty. During the season the Junior Management Committee became dissatisfied with their chairman Mr. C. Adamson because he voted contrarily to their position at an Auckland Rugby League meeting. They subsequently voted him out of the position. Mr. George Rhodes, chairman of the senior management committee attended a later meeting to say that Adamson was on the senior board as an independent representative, not as a representative of the Junior Management Committee and their dismissal of him was unjustified. A vote was then held over who should be chairman with Mr. J. H. Eddowes nominated along with Mr. Adamson and the former won by 10 votes to 6.
- Auckland Rugby League Primary School Management Committee
- Auckland Rugby League Referees Association annual meeting was held at the League Rooms, Grey Buildings on 30 March. The report stated that membership had increased and the standard of refereeing was maintained at a high level.
- Akarana Rugby League Football Club held their annual general meeting at Carlaw Park on Thursday 9 April.
- Avondale League Football Club held their annual meeting at Hick's Tearooms, Avondale on Wednesday 25 March. There was an attendance of about twenty players and the cash credit was £7 10/8. The club voted to thank Mr. H. P. Burton for the use of his ground where the majority of their matches were played in 1930.
- City Rovers annual meeting was held at Carlaw Park on Sunday 22 March to discuss the annual report, balance sheet, general business and to elect officers. Seventy five people attended the meeting where the annual report showed a balance of £33 10/6. They stated that their chances of winning the title the year before was spoiled by the fact that they lost four players to the New Zealand team which toured Australia. They were aiming to have teams in all of the junior grades.
- Devonport United Football Club annual general meeting was held in the Labour Rooms (above Hellaby's), Devonport on Monday 30 March regarding the election of officers and general business. About fifty members attended and the balance sheet showed a credit of £9 7/2.
- Ellerslie United League Football Club held their annual general meeting at the club's Training Shed, Ellerslie on Monday 23 March. They requested that everybody attend as it would be their final meeting due to the league enforced merger with Otahuhu.
- Ellerslie-Otahuhu United League Football Club held their first general meeting at the Ellerslie club's training shed opposite the railway station on Monday 30 March. They had practice for all grades on Saturday 18 April to make final arrangements for all teams as there was a merger of Ellerslie, Otahuhu and Mangere.
- New Lynn League Football Club held their annual general meeting at the Delta Theatre on Monday 23 March. The Glen Lynn club wrote a letter to the New Lynn Borough Council asking for assistance in acquiring a playing area. The council intended to give the club details of an existing league football area on Great North Road in New Lynn which had been used by the New Lynn club prior to the joining of New Lynn and Glen Eden.
- Kingsland Athletic Rugby League Football Club held their annual meeting at Liberty Luncheon Rooms at the top of Symonds Street on Monday 30 March to discuss the annual report and balance sheet. They held a further Special General Meeting on Thursday 16 April at Donovan's Gym, Parnell with all juniors requested to roll up. The Kingsland club amalgamated with the Marist club after they lost Senior A grade status.
- Marist Brothers Old Boys League Football Club annual meeting held at Donovan's Gymnasium, Parnell on Monday 30 March.
- Māngere United League Football Club held a meeting in the Strand Theatre Hall, Onehunga on Wednesday, 29 April.
- Mt. Albert United Rugby League Football Club held their annual meeting at the King George Hall in Mount Albert on Thursday, 5 March to discuss the annual report, balance sheet, election of officers, and general business. There first practice was held at the club's grounds on Springleigh Avenue on Saturday, 11 April. At a Management Committee meeting on 22 April Mount Albert applied to have its Senior B team (who had played in the Senior B Grade – effectively the 2nd division of senior teams in 1930) regraded to first junior.
- Mount Wellington Rugby League Football Club annual meeting was held at the Abattoir, Westfield on Tuesday 24 March to discuss the annual report and balance sheet, the election of officers, and general business. Players and intending players were requested to attend.
- Newmarket Rugby League Club annual meeting was held at the Club Room 235, Khyber Pass, Thursday 26 March. All players and intending players were invited to attend.
- Newton Rangers Football Club annual meeting was held at the Y.M.C.A on Wellesley St. East on Monday 23 March. All vice presidents, members and intending members were invited to attend including late Senior B players (players from Senior B clubs who no longer had senior teams). There was a large attendance with Mr. W. Badley presiding over the meeting and Mr. W. Monteith was elected patron..
- Northcote and Birkenhead Ramblers Football Club annual general meeting was held at the Foresters' Hall, Birkenhead on Thursday 12 March to discuss "business important". They donated £2 2s to the Mayors fund for Napier Earthquake fund. The annual meeting of the Northcote and Birkenhead Ramblers Football Club was their 21st. The president of the club was Mr. A. E. Greenslade who was also the mayor of Northcote. The club report stated that they had a membership of 115 and fielded six teams in the league competition, and that this made them the fourth largest club in Auckland.
- Otahuhu Rugby League Football Club were given use of the Sturges Park and Princes Street playing grounds in a shared arrangement with rugby by the Otahuhu Borough Council.
- Papakura Rugby League Football Club The Papakura Rugby Club had decided to disband and play league instead. They held their first ever meeting in the Parish Hall, Papakura on Thursday, 26 March. Officials of the Auckland Rugby League were present. All members, intending members, players and supporters were invited to attend. Following the meeting a club was formed with 60 players enrolling.
- Papatoetoe Rugby League Football Club held their annual meeting in mid April. There was a large attendance and it was decided to nominate five teams for the season, namely third grade open, fourth grade, fifth grade, sixth grade, and a schoolboys. The club held its annual ball in the Papatoetoe Town Hall on 24 July. The venue was decorated in the club's colours of blue and gold.
- Point Chevalier League Football Club held their annual meeting at the Sailing Club's Hall on Thursday 19 March to discuss business, balance-sheet, and election of officers.
- Ponsonby United Football Club held their annual meeting at Leys Institute, Ponsonby on Monday 30 March to receive their annual report and balance sheet, elect officers, and general business. 80 members attended the meeting and the report referred to how successful the club had been, especially with the senior side winning the Monteith Shield, Roope Rooster, and Thistle Cup. The third grade open team was particularly good and the schoolboy team consisted of players from Ponsonby, Curran Street, and Bayfield Schools.
- Richmond Rovers Football Club annual meeting was held in the Gaiety Hall, Surrey Crescent on Friday 20 March to discuss the annual report and statement of accounts, and general business. About 100 members were in attendance. The report showed that the club had fielded 12 teams in 1930 with four winning the championship. Trophies were presented as follows – Lauder Cup, fourth grade; Milicich Cup, seventh grade A team; Walker Shield: second grade; and a trophy to the schoolboys who tied for first place. They held an additional meeting for all prospective Senior, Senior B, and Second Grade players at Grey Lynn Park on Wednesday, 8 April. On 16 May the Richmond club performed the notable feat of having all eight of its A teams winning their matches, although its Seventh Grade B team was defeated, and the 5th Grade team's victory was by default. Prior to the start of the season the Third Grade captain for Richmond, Mr. George Williams drowned in a fishing accident in Breaker Bay, Wellington.
