= Morrie Boyle =

Australian rugby league footballer and coach

Personal information
- Full name: Morrie Boyle
- Born: 1910
- Died: 2002 (aged 91–92)

Playing information
- Position: Wing
Club
Years	Team	Pld	T	G	FG	P
1929–32	Eastern Suburbs	33	30	3	0	96
Representative
Years	Team	Pld	T	G	FG	P
1930	Metropolis	1	4	0	0	12
- Source: As of 21 June 2019

Morrie Boyle (1910-2002) was an Australian professional rugby league footballer who played in the New South Wales Rugby Football League premiership.

== Career ==
Boyle was a Winger and fullback for the Eastern Suburbs club. He played 40 matches in the years (1929–32). He was a member of the Eastern Suburbs side that was beaten by South Sydney in the 1931 premiership decider.

A noted try scorer, Morrie Boyle scored 28 tries during his career at Easts.

In the 1930 season Boyle was the leading try scorer in the NSWRFL premiership with 15 tries from 15 games. Boyle is recognised as the 196th footballer to play for the Eastern Suburbs club.

He wound down his playing career at Dubbo in 1933, captain-coaching them to the Johnny Walker Cup. He scored 17 tries and 22 goals for Dubbo in 1933. He then moved to captain-coach Canberra in 1934.
