= 1924 New Zealand rugby league season =

Seasons
- ← 1923 1925 →

The 1924 New Zealand rugby league season was the 17th season of rugby league that had been played in New Zealand.

== International competitions ==
New Zealand defeated Great Britain 2–1 in a three match series. The first match, which was also the first test match to be played at Carlaw Park was won 16–8 in front of 22,000 spectators. The second match was won 13–11 at the Basin Reserve. Great Britain came back to win the third and final match 31–18, held at Dunedin's Tahuna Park. New Zealand included; Craddock Dufty, Hec Brisbane, Bill Stuart, Charles Fitzgerald, Terry Gilroy, Maurice Wetherill, first Test captain Thomas McClymont, Jim O'Brien, Sam Lowrie, Ernie Herring, Bill Te Whata, Neil Mouat, Bert Avery, second and third Test captain Frank Delgrosso, Harry Mullins, Clarrie Polson, Bill Devine, Lou Petersen, Lyle Stewart, Ted Fitzgerald and Hec McDonald.

Great Britain defeated Canterbury 47–10. Auckland City lost 11–24 to Great Britain while Auckland Province lost 13–28. Auckland City was Charles Gregory, Ben Davidson, Hec Brisbane, Frank Delgrosso, Maurice Wetherill, Craddock Dufty, Clarrie Polson, Bill Stormont, Wally Somers, Ernie Herring, George Gardiner, Bert Avery and captain Nelson Bass. Auckland Province included Huatahi 'Brownie' Paki and B Johnston from South Auckland as well as Dufty, Brisbane, Wetherill, Thomas McClymont, John Lang, Jim O'Brien, Sam Lowrie, Herring, Avery, Bill Te Whata and Hec McDonald from Auckland City.

== National competitions ==
=== Northern Union Cup ===
South Auckland held the Northern Union Cup at the end of the season.

=== Inter-district competition ===
Canterbury included Bill Stuart, Jim Parkes and Charles Fitzgerald.

== Club competitions ==
=== Auckland ===
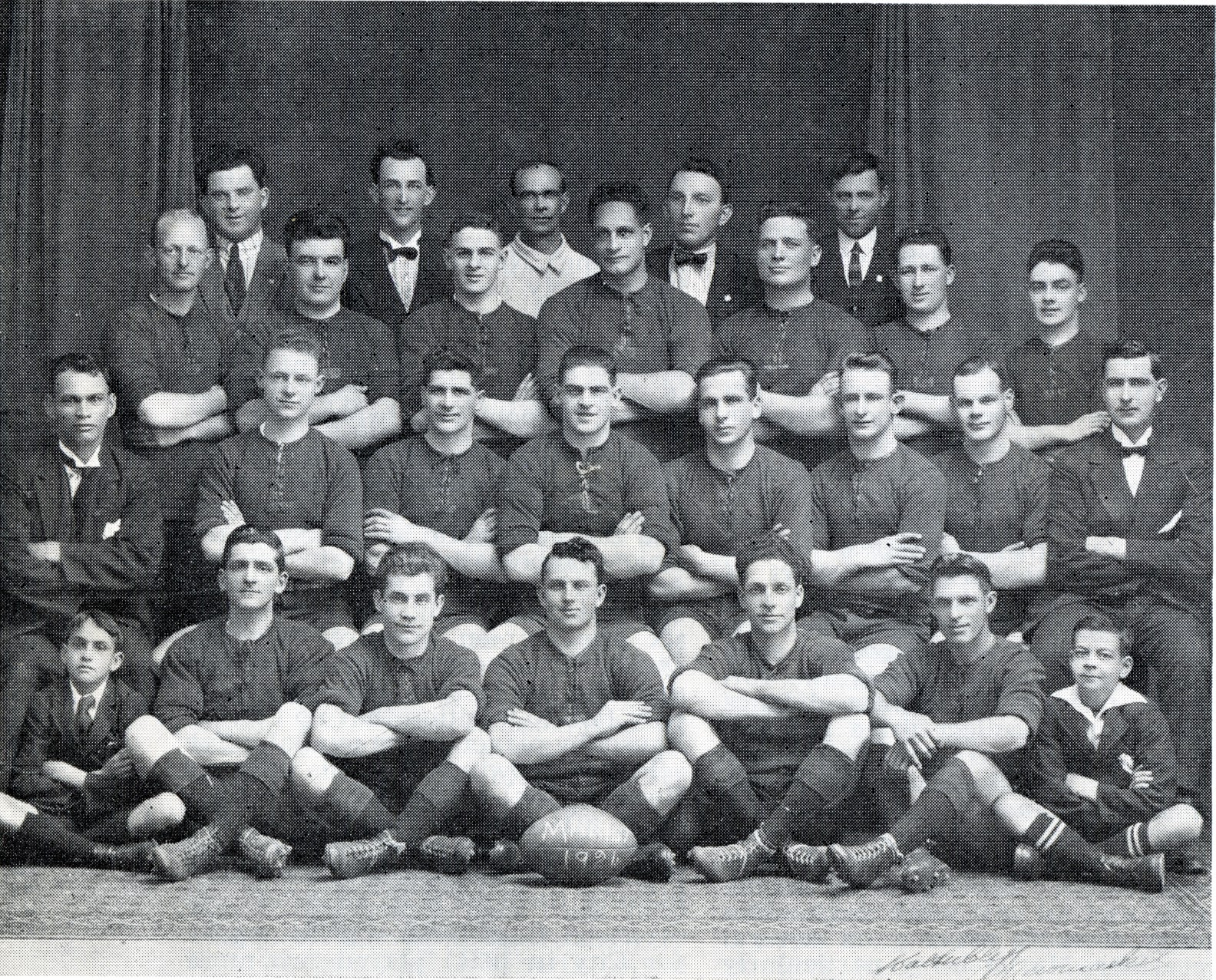
Marist in 1924

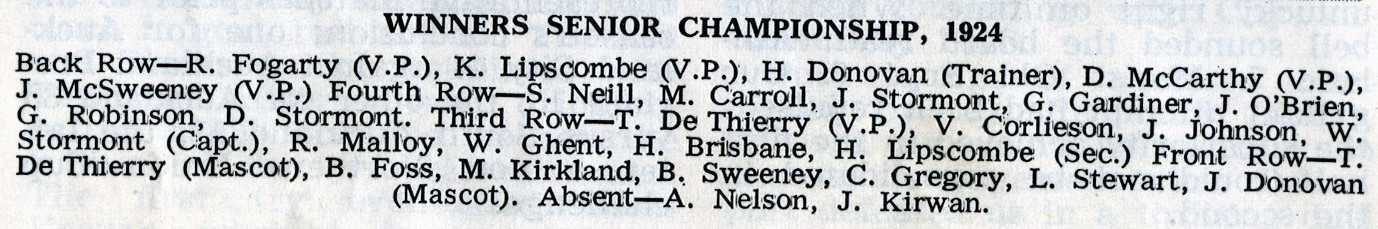

Marist Brothers won the Auckland Rugby League's competition, defeating Devonport 20–17 to win its first championship. City won the Roope Rooster.

Marist included George Gardiner, Jim O'Brien, captain Bill Stormont, Hec Brisbane, Charles Gregory and Jack Kirwan.

Devonport included Jim O'Brien, Neville St George and Bert Laing.

Lou Brown played for City on his return from Wigan, causing a protest from Newton who he had previously played for. The complaint was upheld by both the Auckland Rugby League and the New Zealand Rugby League and Brown was suspended for three weeks until he returned to the competition for Newton.

=== Wellington ===
Hutt won the Wellington Rugby League's Appleton Shield.

=== Canterbury ===
Marist Old Boys won the Canterbury Rugby League's McKeon Cup and the Thacker Shield.

Waimairi played in the senior competition for the first time. Waimairi was renamed Papanui after World War Two.

Marist Old Boys were expelled from the Canterbury Rugby Union in April 1924 after they forfeited a Payne Cup fixture in 1923 due to a row over the eligibility of three players. They instead joined the Rugby League and the Football Association. Marist spent just seven seasons in the Canterbury Rugby League but won three titles, in 1924, 1925 and 1928. In 1924 they produced six New Zealand internationals; Bill Devine, Charles Fitzgerald, Ted Fitzgerald, Terry Gilroy, Harry Mullins and Lou Petersen. Jim Amos also switched codes with Marist but played in their lower divisions.

=== Other Competitions ===
Greymouth Marist joined the West Coast Rugby League in support of Christchurch Marist.

The Otago Rugby League was formed after 12 to 16,000 watched New Zealand play Great Britain at Tahuna Park. The match was played at Tahuna Park due to the Otago Rugby Union's refusal to allow the game to be played at Carisbrook.
