= 1931 New Zealand rugby league season =

Seasons
- 1930 1932

The 1931 New Zealand rugby league season was the 24th season of rugby league that had been played in New Zealand.

== International competitions ==
New Zealand played in no international matches during the season.

The New South Wales Rugby League's Eastern Suburbs Roosters club toured the country with a five match itinerary. They first defeated Northland 23–11 in Whangarei before defeated Devonport 41-27 and South Auckland 23–14 in Hamilton. Easts then played a combined Devonport-Marist team and lost 13–14. Easts then ended the tour with an 18–13 win over the Auckland Colts to finish with a 4–1 record.

== National competitions ==
=== Northern Union Cup ===
Northland held the Northern Union Cup at the end of the season, after they had defeated South Auckland 16–8 at Carlaw Park.

=== Inter-district competition ===
Northland drew with Auckland 19-all at Carlaw Park.

The West Coast defeated Canterbury 37–19 in Greymouth. It was the first time they had defeated Canterbury.

== Club competitions ==
=== Auckland ===
Marist Brothers won the Auckland Rugby League's Fox Memorial Trophy. The Trophy was named after Edward Vincent Fox, who died in 1930 after finally succumbing to wounds suffered during the First World War. Devonport won the Roope Rooster, Stormont Shield and Norton Cup.

The Glenora club was founded in 1931. During the year, at request of the Auckland Rugby League, an amalgamation of the Ellerslie, Otahuhu and Mangere clubs took place, however the clubs abandoned this union at the end of the same year.

Puti Tipene (Steve) Watene played for the City Rovers while Marist included Hec Brisbane and Alan Clarke. Len Scott and Allan Seagar played for Devonport.

=== Canterbury ===
Addington won the Canterbury Rugby League's McKeon Cup.

Runanga became the first West Coast Rugby League team to win the Thacker Shield, when they defeated Addington 16–6 at Monica Park.

=== Other Competitions ===
The Wellington Rugby League's competition was suspended from 1930 until 1933 due to the Great Depression.
