= 1926 New Zealand rugby league season =

Seasons
- ← 1925 1927 →

The 1926 New Zealand rugby league season was the 19th season of rugby league that had been played in New Zealand.

== International competitions ==
New Zealand toured Great Britain, losing the series 0-3 against the Lions and also losing a Test match against Wales. The 1926–27 New Zealand tour of Britain involved several skirmishes within the Kiwi party. Problems began on the boat journey over, with disputes developing about aspects of the trip and a rift developed between tour manager and coach, Australian Ernest Mair, and seven forwards. The disputes continued once the party arrived in Britain, with one of the rebels being involved in a street fight with another member of the tour party after the opening match. In mid-November, following further disturbances which almost led to the tour party being evicted from their Harrogate hotel, it was decided that coach Mair would withdraw from team selection and match tactics for a period of four weeks. The tour, and the costly disputes, continued with the rebels eventually setting sail for home a week earlier than their colleagues. Three months later all seven players were banned for life by the New Zealand authorities. New Zealand did not visit Europe again until 1939. The touring party included; Charles Gregory, Lou Brown, Ben Davidson, Hec Brisbane, Frank Delgrosso, Wally Desmond, Wilson Hall, Frank Henry, Alphonsus Carroll, Ernie Herring, Len Mason, Bert Avery (c), Neil Mouat, Hector Cole, Jack Kirwan, Craddock Dufty, Bill Devine, Lou Petersen, Arthur Singe, Jim Sanders, Harry Thomas, Jim Parkes, George Gardiner and Joe Menzies.

The seven suspended were Singe, Mouat, Wright, Carroll, Devine, Petersen and English-born Henry, who remained in England after the tour and was allowed to play on by the Rugby Football League.

James Carlaw was elected as the President of the New Zealand Rugby League.

== National competitions ==
=== Northern Union Cup ===
Auckland again held the Northern Union Cup at the end of the season. They defeated South Auckland 49-15.

=== Inter-island competition ===
Len Mason scored a try for the South Island, who also included Lou Petersen. The North Island included Bert Avery.

== Club competitions ==
=== Auckland ===
Ponsonby won the Auckland Rugby League's competition and the Stormont Shield. Richmond won the Roope Rooster while Northcote won the Norton Cup.

Arthur Myers died on 9 October. He had served as the Auckland Rugby League president since 1914.

=== Wellington ===
Petone won the Wellington Rugby League's Appleton Shield.

=== Canterbury ===
Hornby won the Canterbury Rugby League's McKeon Cup.

Hornby defended the Thacker Shield twice, beating the West Coast's Runanga 32-10 and Otago's Christian Brothers 40-14.

=== Other Competitions ===
City from the Otago Rugby League won 20-8 over the Canterbury Rugby League's Hornby on 2 October in the inaugural Gore Cup match.
