= 1925 New Zealand rugby league season =

Seasons
- ← 1924 1926 →

The 1925 New Zealand rugby league season was the 18th season of rugby league that had been played in New Zealand.

== International competitions ==
New Zealand toured Australia. They lost their first two matches, to New South Wales and Universities, in close games before defeating Newcastle. New Zealand then defeated New South Wales in back-to-back matches. They defeated Lismore to finish the first leg of the tour before heading to Queensland. They lost to Queensland 43–19 in the first match before going down to Ipswich 22–21. They lost the second match against Queensland 29-20 before losing to the Toowoomba Clydesdales 16–14. New Zealand finished the tour with another victory over New South Wales. On their return New Zealand defeated Auckland 41–17 in front of 18,000 fans at Carlaw Park. They were captained by Bert Laing.

New Zealand then hosted a return tour by Queensland. Queensland played 11 matches losing only one and with a match against Auckland drawn. Queensland played two games against the New Zealand side, losing one 24-25 and winning the other convincingly 35–14. The Maroons also had big wins over West Coast and Otago. Queensland defeated Canterbury 57–15 at Monica Park. The curtain raiser saw Bill Devine lead South Canterbury to a 15–11 win over Canterbury B. Canterbury Combined then lost 10–58 to Queensland in Timaru. Queensland also defeated Auckland Province 54–14. Auckland Province included George Raynor, B Johnston, George Gardiner, A Jackson, Frank Delgrosso, Brian Riley, Bill Peckham, Jim O'Brien, Alf Townsend, Ernie Herring, Joe Menzies, Arthur Singe and Bert Avery. Replacements; Bill Te Whata and Len Mason.

New Zealand were coached by Charlie Pearce.

== National competitions ==
=== Northern Union Cup ===
Auckland held the Northern Union Cup at the end of the season after they defeated South Auckland 24–16 in Auckland. They then defeated South Auckland 36–19 in the Waikato.

Auckland included Charles Gregory, Ivan Littlewood, Frank Delgrosso, Lou Brown, Jack Kirwan, Maurice Wetherill, Stan Webb, Jim O'Brien, Neville St George, Jim O'Brien, Ernie Herring, Arthur Singe, captain Bert Avery, Ben Davidson, Clarrie Polson and George Gardiner.

=== Inter-island competition ===
The first inter-island match was held between the North Island and South Island. Bert Avery played for the North Island while Charles Fitzgerald played for the South Island.

=== Inter-district competition ===
Canterbury defeated Auckland 6–5 at Monica Park on 12 September. This was the last time Canterbury defeated Auckland for 37 years. The same Auckland side defeated the West Coast 22–15 in Greymouth. Canterbury also defeated the West Coast 48–3 in a record win.

Canterbury included; Ted Fitzgerald, Jim Parkes, Tony Green, Frank Henry and captain Lou Petersen.

Auckland included Bill Te Whata.

== Club competitions ==
=== Auckland ===
City won the Auckland Rugby League's competition. Ponsonby won the Roope Rooster while Ellerslie won the Norton Cup.

Bill Stormont fell ill in June and died, aged just 26. His family donated the William Stormont Memorial Shield to the Auckland Rugby League. Ponsonby defeated City 35–3 to become the first holder of the Stormont Shield.

Jim O'Brien played for Marist while Jim O'Brien played for Devonport.

=== Wellington ===
Hutt won the Wellington Rugby League's Appleton Shield.

=== Canterbury ===
Marist won the Canterbury Rugby League's McKeon Cup. Addington won the Thacker Shield.

Joseph Ward opened the Canterbury Rugby League's new Monica Park on 18 April. The League had paid 6,000 pounds for the land.
