= 1930 New Zealand rugby league season =

Seasons
- ← 1929 1931 →

The 1930 New Zealand rugby league season was the 23rd season of rugby league that had been played in New Zealand.

== International competitions ==
New Zealand toured Australia, playing in no Test matches. New Zealand were coached by Arthur Hennessy and captained by Charles Gregory.

Cyril Sneddon was elected the New Zealand Rugby League president.

== National competitions ==
=== Northern Union Cup ===
South Auckland held the Northern Union Cup at the end of the season, after defeating Auckland 13–12.

Earlier in the season Northland had challenged Auckland and had led 12–11 at halftime before going down 21–16.

Northland included Ted Meyer while Auckland included Alan Clarke, Claude List, Allan Seagar, Puti Tipene (Steve) Watene, Craddock Dufty, Len Barchard (on debut), Stan Clark and captains Maurice Wetherill and Charles Gregory. South Auckland included George Tittleton and Edwin Abbot.

== Club competitions ==
=== Auckland ===
Ponsonby won the Auckland Rugby League's competition and the Roope Rooster. Devonport won the Stormont Shield while Otahuhu won the Norton Cup.

Puti Tipene (Steve) Watene played for the City Rovers.

John A. Lee served on the Auckland Rugby League's executive.

=== Canterbury ===
Hornby won the Canterbury Rugby League's McKeon Cup and Thacker Shield.

Linwood regained senior status for the 1930 season.

=== Other Competitions ===
The Wellington Rugby League's competition was suspended from 1930 until 1933 due to the Great Depression.
