= 1929 New Zealand rugby league season =

Seasons
- ← 1928 1930 →

The 1929 New Zealand rugby league season was the 22nd season of rugby league that had been played in New Zealand.

== International competitions ==
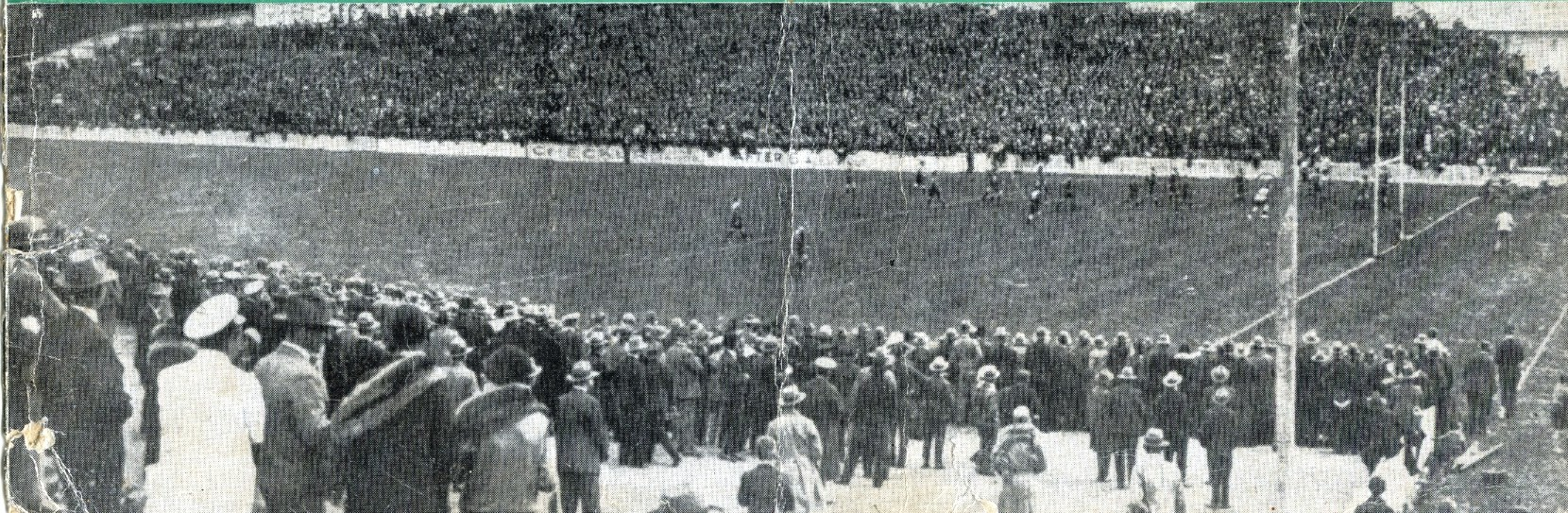
Marist playing South Sydney

New Zealand played in no international matches in 1929.

The New South Wales Rugby Football League's South Sydney Rabbitohs toured the country late in the season. They played two matches against Marist, with both sides securing one win. South Sydney also defeated Huntly. Souths were without five Kangaroos who were on a tour of Great Britain. Marist won the first match 10–9 at Carlaw Park while Souths won the second 21–5 in front of 15,000 fans.

== National competitions ==
=== Northern Union Cup ===
Auckland again held the Northern Union Cup at the end of the season. They defeated Canterbury 47-18 before defeating South Auckland 11-8 and Northland 22–19. It was Northlands first season of rugby league.

Auckland included Frank Delgrosso and Allan Seagar.

=== Inter-island competition ===
The South Island defeated the North Island 23–13. It was the first time the South had won the inter-island match. The South Island team included Claude Dobbs, Mick O'Brien, Jim Amos, Jim Calder, Norm Griffiths, Alf Townsend, captain Jim Sanders, Charlie McElwee and Bert Eckhoff.

== Club competitions ==
=== Auckland ===
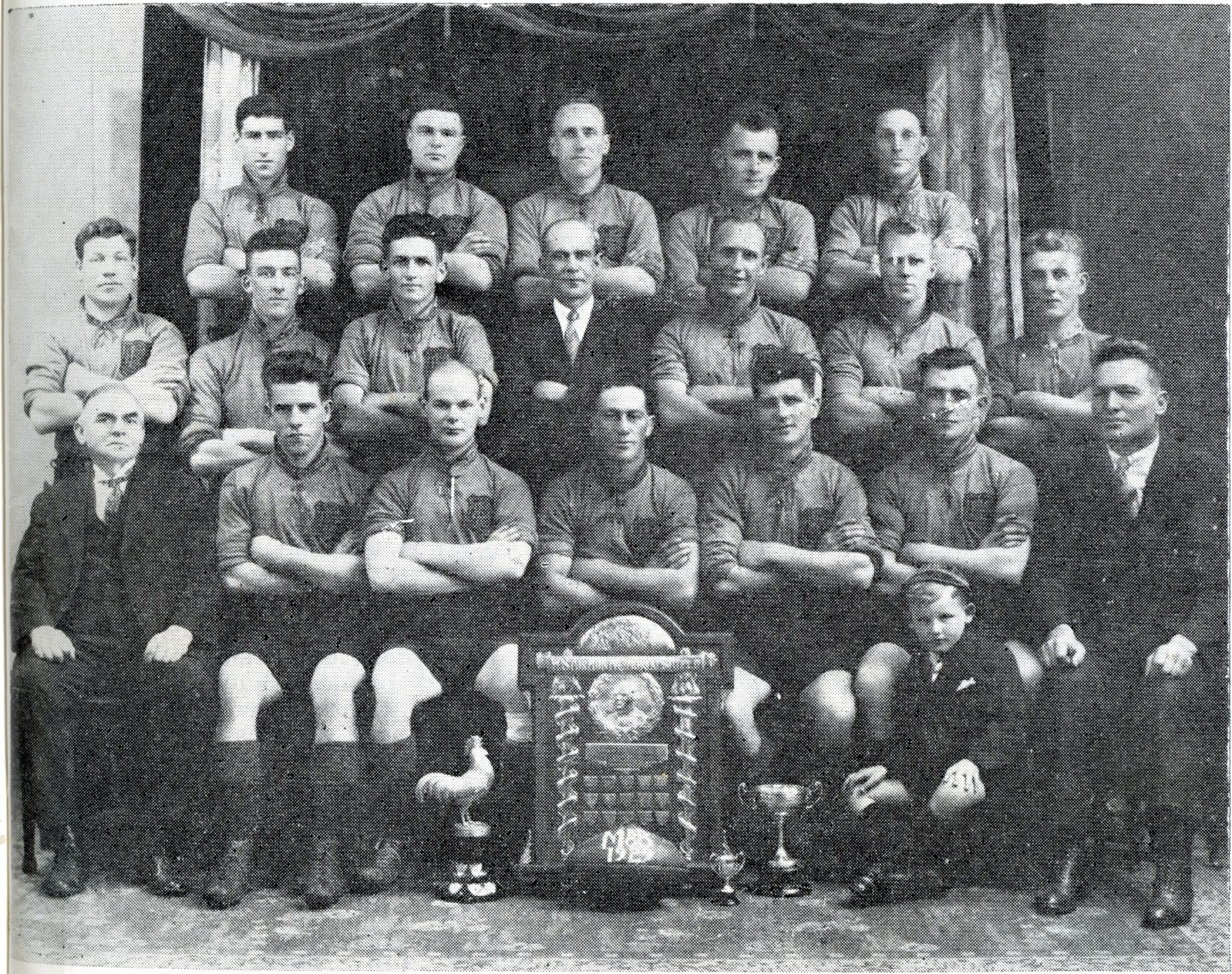
Marist in 1929

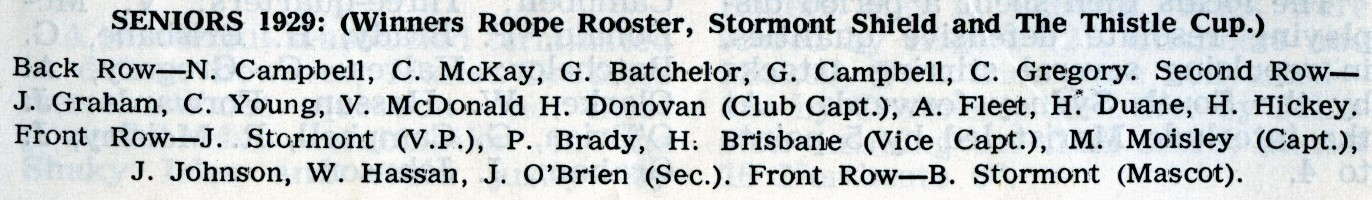

Ponsonby won the Auckland Rugby League's competition. Marist Brothers won the Roope Rooster, Stormont Shield and Thistle Cup, defeating Ponsonby 28–14 in the champion of champion matches. Point Chevalier won the Norton Cup.

Puti Tipene (Steve) Watene played for the City Rovers.

Marist were coached by Jack Kirwan and included Norm Campbell, Gordon Campbell, Charles Gregory, Hec Brisbane and Wilf Hassan. Jim O'Brien was the clubs' secretary. Frank Delgrosso captained Ponsonby.

=== Wellington ===
Celtic won the Wellington Rugby League's Appleton Shield.

=== Canterbury ===
Addington won the Canterbury Rugby League's McKeon Cup and Thacker Shield.

=== Other Competitions ===
The Otago Rugby League's Christian Brothers defeated Addington 29–8 to win the Gore Cup.
