= 1932 New Zealand rugby league season =

Seasons
- ← 1931 1933 →

The 1932 New Zealand rugby league season was the 25th season of rugby league that had been played in New Zealand.

== International competitions ==
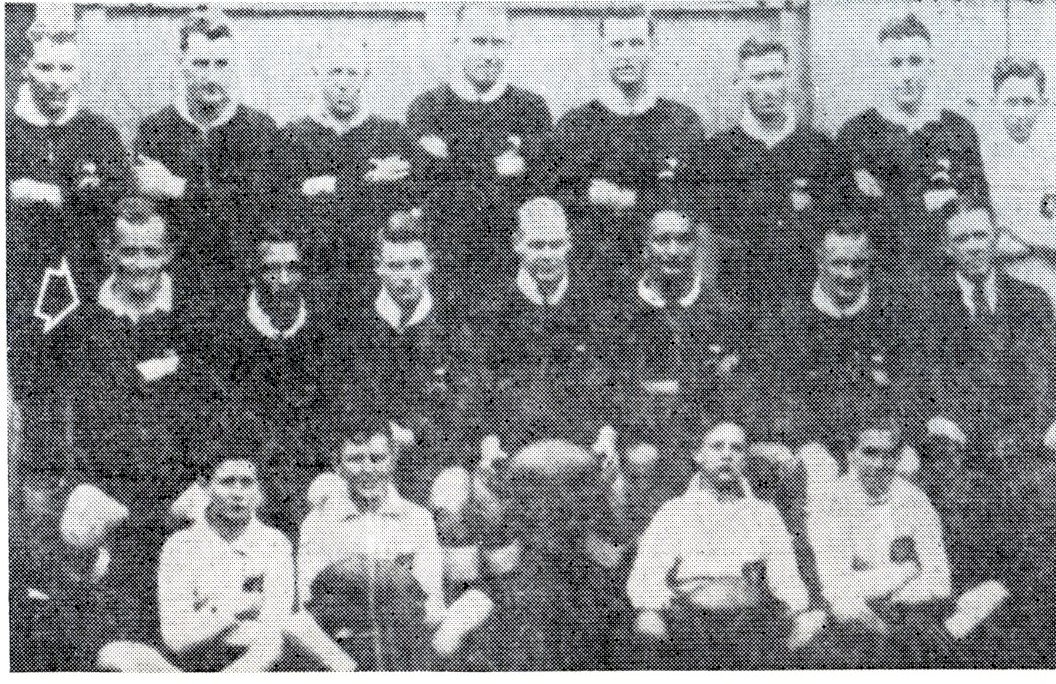
New Zealand 1932 Test squad

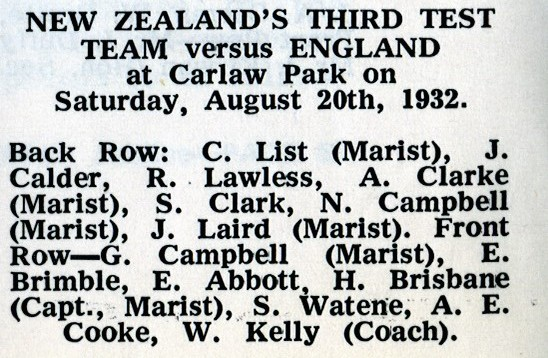

New Zealand lost a series against Great Britain, 0–3. New Zealand were coached by Bill Kelly and included Albert Laing, Claude List, Hec Brisbane (c), Dick Smith, Len Scott, Bert Cooke, Jonas Masters, Jim Calder, Neville St George, Bob Stephenson, Lou Hutt, Tom Timms, Mick O'Brien, Puti Tipene (Steve) Watene, Ben Davidson, Wilf Hassan, Edwin Abbot, Norm Campbell, Gordon Campbell, Stan Clark, Jim Laird, Alan Clarke, Ray Lawless and Jim Amos.

Auckland, who were also coached by Bill Kelly, lost to Great Britain 19–14. The Auckland team was; Norm Campbell, Pat Meehan, Ben Davidson, Claude List, Bert Cooke, Hec Brisbane, Wilf Hassan, Stan Clark, Gordon Campbel, Lou Hutt, Alan Clarke, Ray Lawless and Trevor Hall. Reserves; Allan Seagar, Len Scott and Neville St George.

Puti Tipene (Steve) Watene played for the North Island against Great Britain in Wellington.

== National competitions ==
=== Northern Union Cup ===
South Auckland held the Northern Union Cup at the end of the season, after they had defeated Northland in Ngaruawahia.

=== Inter-district competition ===
The West Coast defeated Canterbury 53–26.

== Club competitions ==
=== Auckland ===
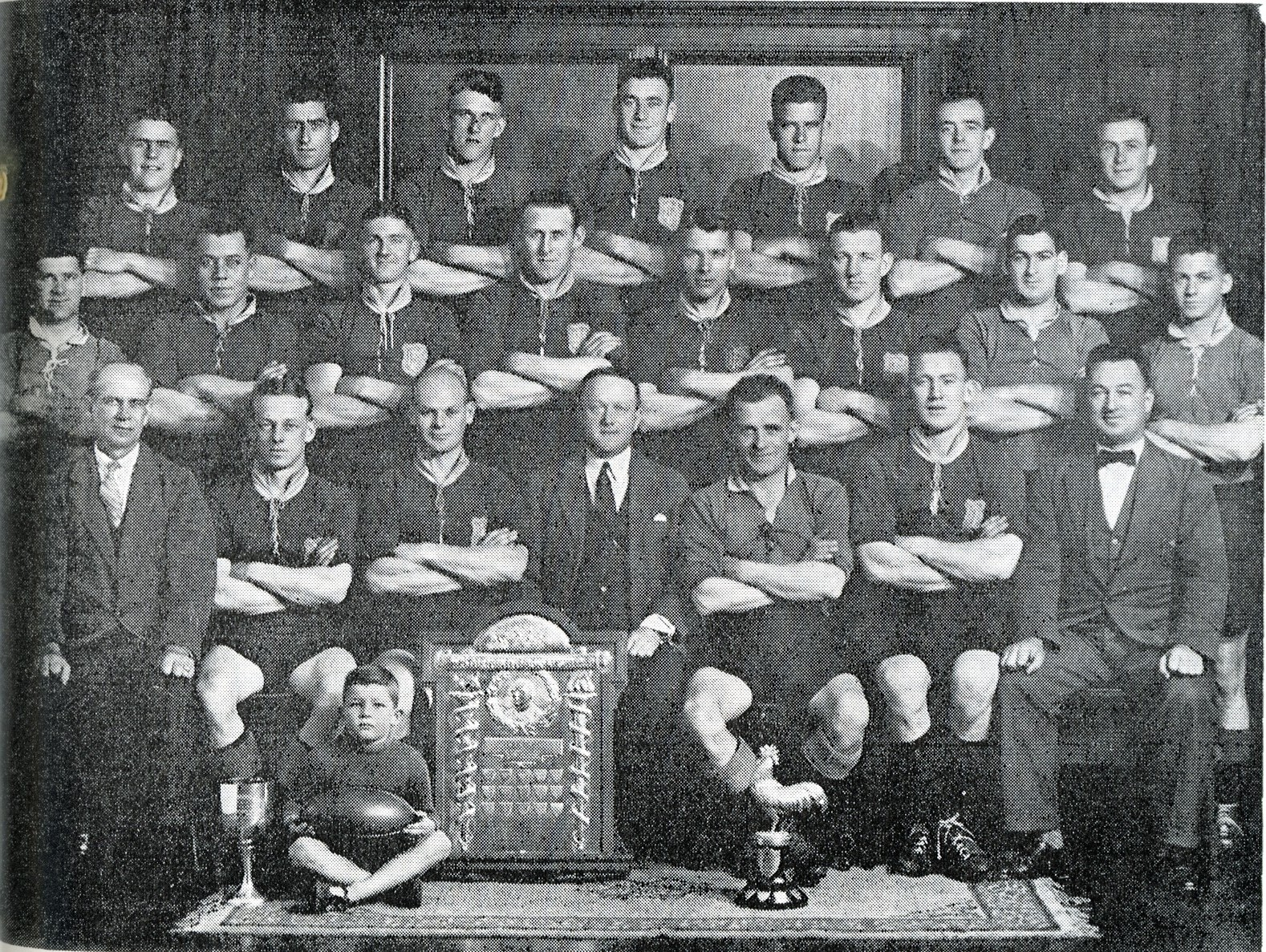
Marist in 1932

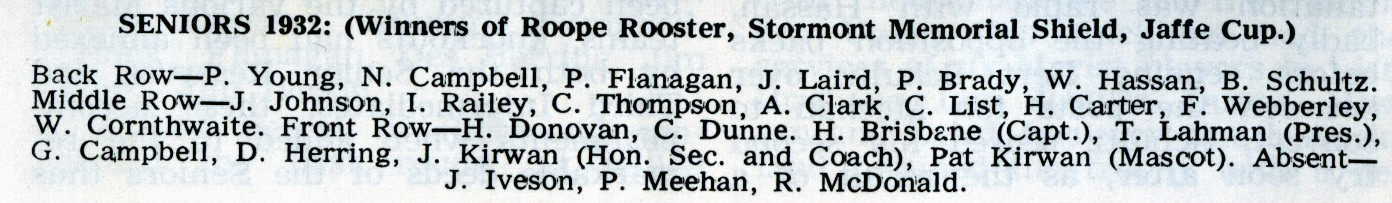

Devonport won the Auckland Rugby League's Fox Memorial Trophy. Marist Brothers won the Stormont Shield, Roope Rooster and Jaffe Cup. Richmond won the Norton Cup.

Puti Tipene (Steve) Watene played for the City Rovers.

Marist were coached by Jack Kirwan and included Claude List, Wilf Hassan, Alan Clarke, Norm Campbell, Jim Laird, Hec Brisbane and Gordon Campbell.

James Carlaw was the Auckland Rugby League's President while Jim Rukutai served as a Clubs Delegate.

=== Canterbury ===
Linwood won the Canterbury Rugby League's McKeon Cup.

Runanga defeated Linwood 12–3 to retain the Thacker Shield.

=== Other Competitions ===
The Wellington Rugby League's competition was suspended from 1930 until 1933 due to the Great Depression.
