= Bill Stuart (rugby league) =

New Zealand international rugby league footballer

Personal information
- Full name: William John Stuart
- Born: 27 June 1905; Blenheim, Marlborough, New Zealand
- Died: 26 August 1982 (aged 77); New Zealand

Playing information
- Position: Wing, Centre, Stand-off, Lock
Club
Years	Team	Pld	T	G	FG	P
1924–28	Hornby	67	20	4	0	68
1929–32	Addington	47	12	0	0	36
	Total	114	32	4	0	104
Representative
Years	Team	Pld	T	G	FG	P
1924–31	Canterbury	4	3	0	0	9
1924	New Zealand	2	1	0	0	3

William John Stuart is a New Zealand rugby league footballer who represented New Zealand.

== Early life ==
William (Bill) John Stuart's parents were Elizabeth (née. McBreen) and John Stuart. They married in 1902 and had 3 sons. Bill was the eldest, born on 27 June in Blenheim 1905. His younger brothers were James, born in 1908 and Allan Oswald born in 1914. His mother Elizabeth died on 22 August 1929, aged just 47. His father John died in 1954.

== Playing career ==
Stuart played for Hornby in the Canterbury Rugby League competition before being selected for New Zealand in 1924 despite having suffered a knee injury in trials that troubled him for the rest of his career. He scored a try in his debut Test against the Great Britain Lions in Auckland and also played in the third Test in Dunedin.

Stuart was a South Island reserve in 1928 and a reserve for the Canterbury team to play Otago in the same season but was not required to play. He switched to Addington in 1929, helping the club to a Thacker Shield victory. He spent much of his time in moving from the centre to the wing positionally, before later playing often at standoff. After his move to Addington and suffering an injury in early 1930 he returned to play mainly at lock.

During 1931 he moved back to the wing and showed good form scoring tries consistently. He was then selected for the Canterbury team to play the West Coast in a match for the Anisy Shield. It had been seven years since he had last pulled on the Canterbury representative jersey. The match was played at Wingham Park in Greymouth before a crowd of 1,500. West Coast won 37–19 with Stuart said to have "made no mistakes", and he also scored a try.
