= Terry Gilroy =

New Zealand international rugby league and rugby union footballer

Personal information
- Full name: Joseph Terrance Patrick Gilroy
- Born: 8 March 1902 Bluff, New Zealand
- Died: 21 March 1982 (aged 80) Riverton, New Zealand

Playing information
- Height: 5 ft 7 in (1.70 m)

Rugby union
- Position: Wing
Club
Years	Team	Pld	T	G	FG	P
19??–24	Marist Old Boys

Rugby league
- Position: Wing
Club
Years	Team	Pld	T	G	FG	P
1924–26	Marist Old Boys
1927–??	Waimairi
	Total	0	0	0	0	0
Representative
Years	Team	Pld	T	G	FG	P
	Canterbury
1924	New Zealand	2	1	0	0	3

Terence Patrick Gilroy (8 March 1902 – 21 March 1982) was a New Zealand rugby union and professional rugby league footballer who played representative rugby league (RL) for New Zealand national team in 1924. Joined 28th Maori Battalion 1939–1943; attained rank of captain.

== Playing career ==
Gilroy switched to rugby league with the Marist Old Boys club when they were expelled from the Canterbury Rugby Union in 1924. Gilroy was so successful that he was selected to represent New Zealand that year in two Test matches against the Australia team. In August 1924, he played for New Zealand against the England team in Auckland.

Gilroy joined Waimairi in 1927.
