= Harry Thomas (rugby league) =

New Zealand international rugby league footballer

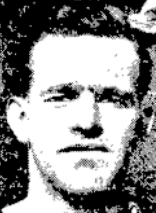

Personal information
- Full name: Henry Edward Thomas
- Born: c. 1900 Cromwell, New Zealand
- Died: 5 September 1964 Invercargill, New Zealand

Playing information
- Height: 183 cm (6 ft 0 in)
- Weight: 78 kg (12 st 4 lb)

Rugby union
Club
Years	Team	Pld	T	G	FG	P
1920–24	Alhambra

Rugby league
- Position: Second-row, Prop
Club
Years	Team	Pld	T	G	FG	P
1925–27	Athletic	15	13	1	0	41
Representative
Years	Team	Pld	T	G	FG	P
1924–27	Otago	5	0	0	0	0
1925	Otago Blues	1	1	0	0	3
1925–26	Otago & West Coast	2	0	0	0	0
1925	South Island	1	1	0	0	3
1925–27	New Zealand	24 (2)	3 (1)	0	0	9 (3)
1926	The Rest (NZ)	1	0	0	0	0
1926	NZ Possibles	1	0	0	0	0

Henry "Harry" Edward Thomas was a New Zealand professional rugby league footballer who played in the 1920s. He played at representative level for New Zealand, and Otago, as a second-row.

== International honours ==
Thomas represented New Zealand in 1925 against Australia, and on the 1926–1927 New Zealand rugby league tour of Great Britain against Wales.
