= Alan Clarke (rugby league) =

NZ international rugby league footballer

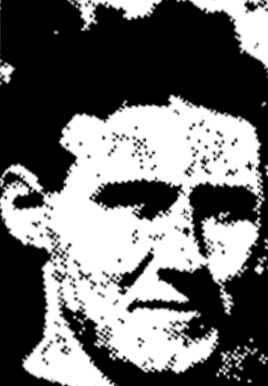

Personal information
- Full name: Alan J Clarke
- Born: 1907 New Zealand
- Died: 21 October 1958 (aged 50–51) Auckland, New Zealand

Playing information
- Weight: 13 st 13 lb (88 kg)
- Position: Centre, Second-row, Lock
Club
Years	Team	Pld	T	G	FG	P
1922–28	Newton Rangers	77	29	14	0	115
1929–36	Marist Old Boys	66	15	46	1	139
1930	Private Taxis	1	0	1	0	2
1931	Devonport-Marist	1	0	4	0	8
	Total	145	44	65	1	264
Representative
Years	Team	Pld	T	G	FG	P
1924–32	Auckland	14	3	11	0	31
1926–31	North Island	4	2	6	0	18
1926–32	Auckland Trial	2	1	0	0	3
1928–32	New Zealand Trial	2	2	1	0	8
1932	New Zealand	1	0	0	0	0
- As of 18 August 2021

Alan Clarke was a rugby league player who represented New Zealand in one test match against England in 1932 at lock. In the process he became the 227th player to represent New Zealand. He also played rugby league for the North Island and Auckland representative sides as well as the Newton Rangers, and Marist Old Boys clubs.

== Playing career ==
=== Newton Rangers debut ===
Alan Clarke began being named in the Newton Rangers senior side in the Auckland Rugby League competition in June 1922 whilst still aged just 16, 4 months off his 17th birthday. His debut came in a round 6 match against Richmond Rovers on 10 June and it was said that he and Voysey “responded well” as Newton won 32 to 8. At this stage of his career he was playing regularly in the back line and it wasn't until he was more established that he began to play in the loose forwards. On 17 June, in a match with City Rovers, he played on the wing and “showed pace, and should have received more opportunities”. He was also said to have played well in the “rear guard” in a loss on 1 July to Ponsonby United at Carlaw Park. Clarke scored his first try in senior grade on 22 July against the Fire Brigade side. It was said to be a “cheap try” after Newdick of Fire Brigade was blinded by the sun whilst trying to field a kick. Clarke, who was playing in the forwards, was following up and he gathered and scored. Clarke finished the 1922 season playing 9 matches for Newton whilst adding a conversion to the try he scored for 5 points in his debut season.

The 1923 season saw Clarke play 12 matches for Newton, scoring 2 tries and kicking a penalty in a Roope Rooster first round loss to Marist Old Boys, a team he was to eventually join. He had played in a variety of positions and even took up the fullback position in their round 11 match against Devonport United.

=== Auckland debut ===
In 1924 Clarke played 8 matches for Newton and obviously impressed the selectors as he was named as a reserve for the Auckland B team in their match against Lower Waikato on 20 August. He played 4 further matches for Newton and was then selected in a weakened Auckland side to play South Auckland (Waikato) on 20 September. The final round of the Auckland first grade competition was being played and so players from Devonport, Marist, Richmond, and Athletic were all unavailable for selection. Unsurprisingly Auckland were easily defeated by 21 points to 5 at Steele Park in Hamilton.

The following season in 1925 Clarke played 12 games for Newton and scored 7 tries and kicked 5 goals. His first try of the season came in a match against Athletic where he combined with Victor Humby, Clarrie Polson, and Wally Somers. The New Zealand Herald listed him amongst the “prominent Auckland players… who have claims for selection”. From 13 June to 18 July he scored tries in 4 consecutive matches against Athletic, City, Richmond, and Marist respectively. The Herald commented following these matches that “it often takes some players several seasons to find their position in a team. This can well be applied to Clarke, of Newton. In the last two games Clarke has filled the position of wing-three quarter and in this place played a fine game against Richmond”.

=== North Island selection ===
1926 saw Clarke play 10 games for Newton and he scored 37 points from 9 tries, 3 conversions and 2 penalties. This placed him 9th on the season scoring list for 1st grade competitions. Following their round 5 match with Marist the New Zealand Herald stated that “Clarke was easily the best forward on the ground. He displayed plenty of pace in the open and his handling and passing were excellent. He should go very near representative honours this season”. The next week he scored 3 tries in a 26–10 win over Grafton Athletic and was said to again be the best forward on the field with “his speed and clever handling enabling him to take part in most of the attacking movements. The claims of the Newton forwards for a place in the trial games cannot be overlooked”. On 19 June Newton played City and after the game the Herald wrote of the claims of various players to a place in the Auckland representative side. It was said that selectors Fox, McClymont and Asher had "no easy task” and that “the form shown by many young players is very encouraging, and it will occasion no surprise to see many of those who usually gain places passed over in favour of younger men. This particularly applies to the forwards. Although only six are required, the claims of Clarke (Newton), A. Scott (Devonport), and Payne (Ponsonby) have already been discussed".

The Auckland selectors chose 20 players to go into training for the match against Waikato and Clarke was included amongst the forwards. It was said “Clarke, of Newton, has on many occasions shown himself to be a clever forward, and, given an opportunity, he will not fail to bring himself in line with the best six forwards playing the game. Following the squads Thursday night training Clarke was named to play in the second row along with Lou Hutt, with Bert Avery at lock. The match was played at Carlaw Park on 26 June and saw Auckland run out easy winners by 49 to 15. Clarke had obviously impressed the selectors as he was then picked in the North Island side, a team he was to go on to represent on 3 further occasions. He played in the second row and was “equal to any of the North Island forwards [and] was a great worker in the loose and never let up against the solid opposition. The Newton forward has yet to gain experience but he has youth and fitness in his favour and should he gain a place in the [New Zealand] touring team, it can be safely said that he would return a polished forward”. At this stage of his career Clarke was still only aged 20, and a few months shy of his 21st birthday. The North Island won the match against the South Island 31 to 22 before a crowd of 18,000. The stakes had been particularly high with the New Zealand selectors looking to choose 26 players to tour England, Wales, and France. He was picked to play lock for Auckland against a “Rest of New Zealand” side on 7 July. The Auckland team omitted several of their leading players to give others a chance to impress and Clarke “in the Auckland vanguard” did just that as he along with Alf Townsend and Jim O’Brien “were the best”.

Clarke was then selected in a New Zealand trial to be played as curtain raiser to the NZ Probables v Possibles match. He played in the A Team and scored a try in a 30–28 loss. He was subsequently named in the Auckland side to take on the New Zealand team prior to their departure for Europe but ultimately did not play in the game. Clarke then informed the selectors that he was also unavailable for selection for their match with Otago and it was stated in the Auckland Star that the reason was due to injury. He missed further matches for Newton against Richmond and Marist before eventually returning to play against Grafton on 4 September. Clarke scored all 13 of Newton's points from 3 tries and 2 conversions in a 13 to 12 win. He scored another try and kicked 2 penalty goals in Newton's round 1 defeat in the Roope Rooster competition to Richmond. That was his final match of the season as he was named in the reserves for Auckland in their match with South Auckland but did not take the field.

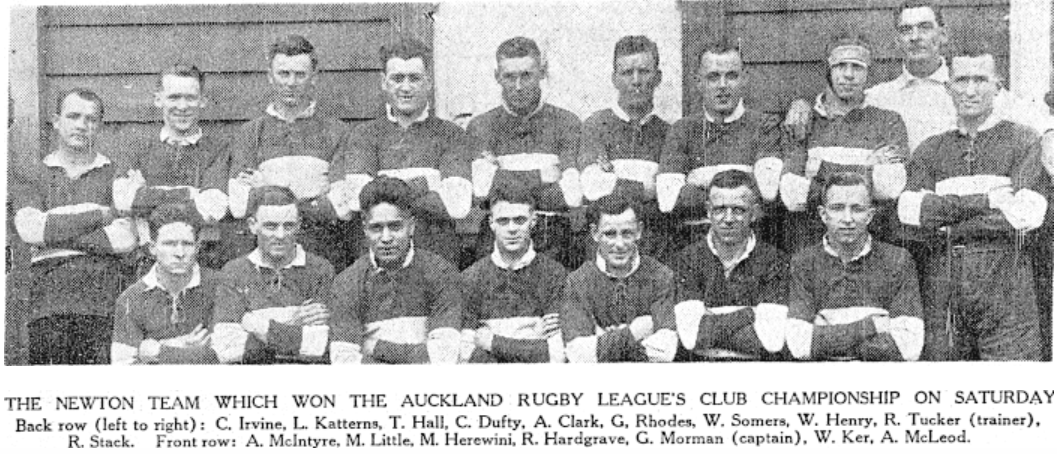
Clarke 5th from the left in the back row of the champion Newton side of 1927.

The 1927 season saw Clarke open the season with a representative appearance for Auckland against the New Zealand side which had returned from their tour. He scored a try and kicked a conversion and a penalty in a 24–21 win before a crowd of 14,000 at Carlaw Park. He was in excellent form for Newton throughout the year being mentioned regularly by the press. Following a win over City on 28 May, the Auckland Star said “much of Newton’s victory must be handed out to Clarke, who towered above his energetic pack as the best forward on the ground. He was the principal connecting link between the forwards and the rear guard, in addition to being up with everything that was going”. He was playing in the pack with Henry, Wally Somers, and Trevor Hall and they helped Newton to their 2nd ever first grade title with a 10 win, 1 draw, 2 loss record. Against Ponsonby United he was reported as “the most resourceful scrummager for Newton and the best forward on the ground”. Following the final round Newton had found themselves level with Ponsonby at the top of the table and so a playoff for the title was necessary. Newton won a match described as “one of the hardest contests for some years” by 6 points to 3 before 12,000 spectators at Carlaw Park. Clarke was said to have given “a brilliant display, being the best forward on the ground. He possessed rare pace and a nice swerve. With more experience, Clarke should develop into a great player”.

He was selected for Auckland ‘Southern Tour’ where they played matches with Canterbury, West Coast, Otago, and Wellington. On 10 September Clarke was part of the side who beat Canterbury 24–13 at Monica Park in Christchurch in front of 3,000. He also played in the 20–13 win over Otago at the Caledonian Ground in Dunedin where 2,000 watched. It is not known if he played in either of the other two fixtures as full lineups were not published in any of the nations newspapers.

Then on returning to Auckland, Clarke was selected for the North Island side to play their annual match with the South Island. The North Island won by 13 points to 8 with Clarke said to have played well though he “was inclined to be uncertain”. He then finished his season playing in the Stormont Shield ‘champion of champions’ match against Richmond. Newton won for the only time in their history 25 to 14 with Clarke scoring a try. The match was notable for the large number of injuries with 3 Newton players taken to Auckland Hospital with broken bones and Somers spraining his ankle.

The 1928 season saw Clarke play 14 matches for Newton scoring 3 tries and kicking 1 conversion.

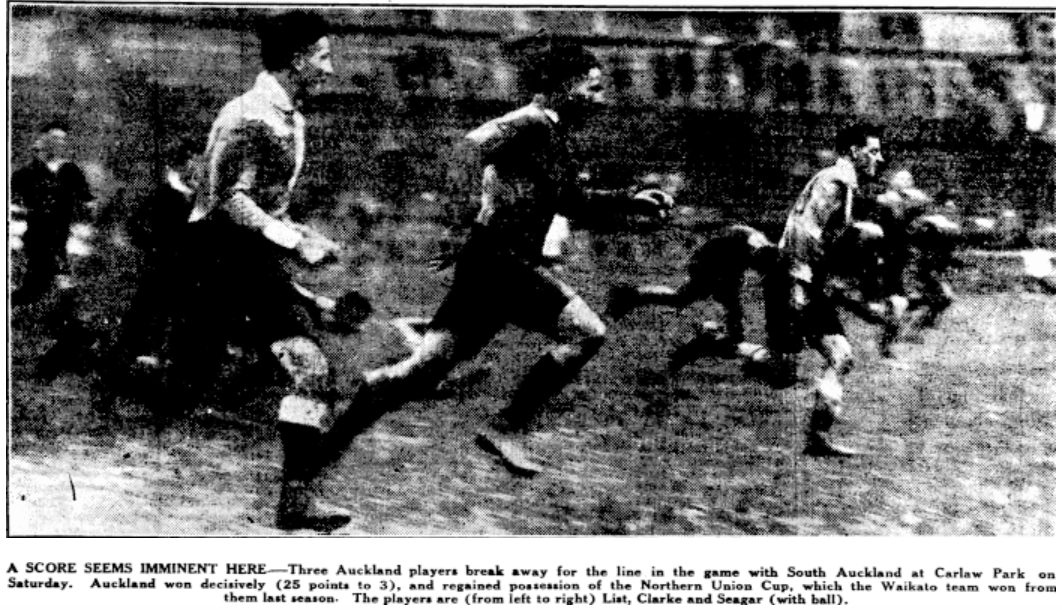

He was chosen by selectors Fox, Avery, and Asher to play in the second row for Auckland in their 16 June match against South Auckland. In pouring rain Clarke “shone” along with Alf Scott, Payne, and Lou Hutt who all did well “in the loose play”.

On 11 July Clarke played for the Auckland Possibles side in a trial match against the Probables. His side won 24 to 14. He was subsequently picked for Auckland for their clash against the visiting Canterbury team. Auckland trounced them 66 to 26 with Clarke converting a try. He then played in Auckland's surprise defeat to South Auckland 19 points to 17.

Clarke was chosen for the New Zealand Possibles team in a trial match against the Probables. The selectors were endeavouring to finalise the New Zealand side to play 3 tests against the touring England team. His side went down 27 to 24 but he scored a try and kicked a penalty with the Auckland Star saying there was “no denying the fact that… Clarke was the outstanding forward in the trial game”. His teammate Hall had also missed selection and the New Zealand Herald writer commented prior to the naming of the first test side that “the two outstanding forwards were Hall and Clarke, who played great games. The Newton pair made a big impression and their speed and fine handling were greatly admired. Both must have a chance in the final selection”.

He was named to play for the Auckland provincial side which contained players from the Waikato against England but ultimately he didn't play in the match. Clarke did however turn out for Auckland against the tourists and he scored a try in a 26–15 loss at Carlaw Park before an enormous crowd of 25,000. Clarke played in the lock position with Bill Horton playing in the corresponding position for England. Clarke's try was a magnificent long range effort. Maurice Wetherill had broken through 25 five yards out from their own line and ran to halfway before he ”passed to Clarke. The Newton forward drove ahead, veering to the left with Brough and Frodsham in deadly pursuit. It was a great triangular race that roused the crowd to a high pitch of excitement. Keeping his course, Clarke held on long enough to cross the English line near the corner”. The try had pushed Auckland out to an 8–0 lead and they later led 15-6 before being run down.

Clarke played a handful of matches for Newton before the end of the season but also missed two games that he was initially chosen for Auckland against Otago and Northland respectively, and he missed Newton's semi final loss to Ponsonby in the Roope Rooster. This was to be Clarke's last involvement with the Newton club.

=== Transfer to Marist Old Boys ===
There was controversy to start the 1929 season involving Clarke, his Newton club and Marist Old Boys. On 20 April he played in a practice match for Marist. He had transferred to Christchurch but returned to Auckland and joined Marist. It was reported in the Christchurch Press that he "had applied for a transfer to Christchurch, which had been granted, making him eligible to play for any club in Christchurch. [However] the secretary reported that the player had returned north". His Newton club were not happy with the situation and asked for a “cancellation” of his transfer and that “he must play for Newton”. Clarke was however cleared to play for Marist after the Canterbury League granted him a clearance and debuted for Marist against Richmond on 4 May. In a match on 1 June against City Rovers Clarke was sent off for “straining the patience of the referee in querying decisions”. He was unable to play the following weekend as his disciplinary hearing was not held until 12 June. They obviously deemed the one match missed to be sufficient as he played against Newton in round 8 on 15 June. Clarke did however miss several matches and only came on as a replacement in Marist's round 14 match with Devonport. Despite finishing the season mid table Marist had struck excellent form in the second half of the season and went unbeaten through 12 matches to claim the Roope Rooster title with a 17–9 win over Ponsonby, and a 28–14 win over the same opponent to win the Stormont Shield. Clarke scored a try in the Roope Rooster final. He was said to follow up his good performance in the semi-final win over City “with an even better one on Saturday. He possesses anticipation above the average forward”. In the Stormont Shield final it was said that the Marist “forwards did some splendid work in the loose, O’Brien and Clarke standing out prominently”, although early in the second half Clarke had to leave the field with an injury. However Ponsonby had also lost Frank Delgrosso to injury shortly before and Marist ultimately ran away with the match to claim their second straight Stormont Shield title.

Marist's form was so good that when the South Sydney side toured New Zealand for 3 matches the Auckland Rugby League decided that Marist should be their opponents for both matches played in Auckland. Clarke played in both games and in the first Marist won 10 points to 9 before 15,000 at Carlaw Park. Clarke played in a halfback position to counter Souths positioning. Australian sides often played with just 5 in the scrum and were more attacking by nature. It was said Marist “took Clarke from the scrum with a good deal of success…it was really surprising to see [him] fit in so well with a combination that has been together throughout the season”.

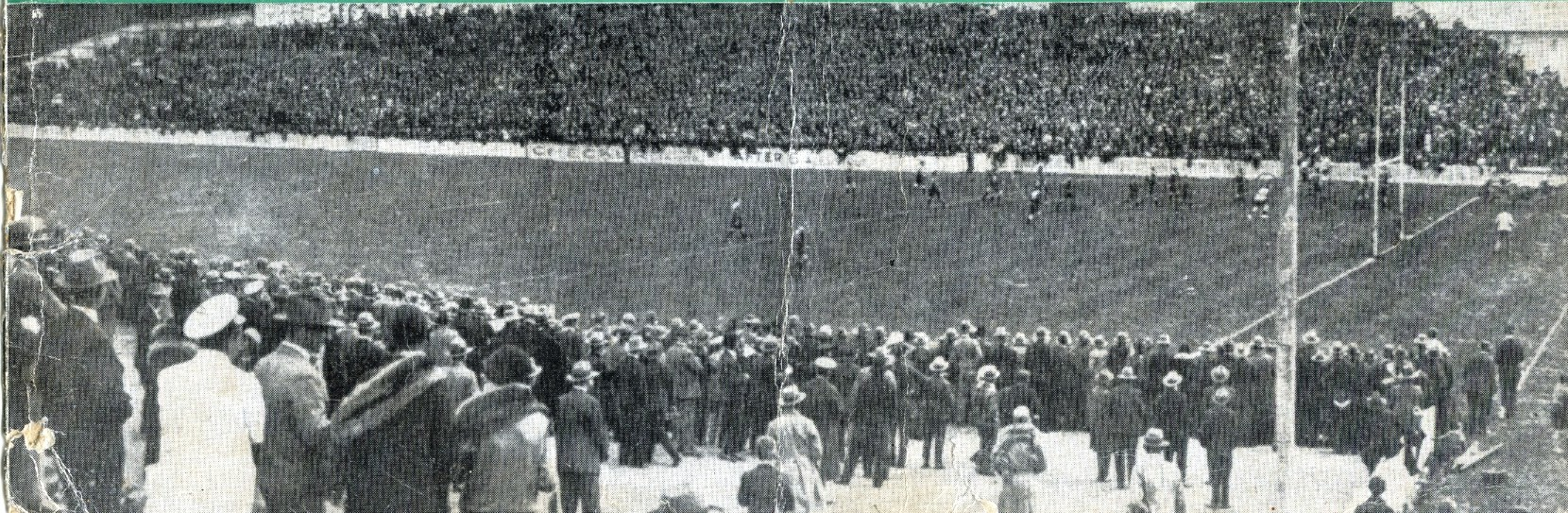
Marist v South Sydney at Carlaw Park on 12 October 1929

The following weekend saw Clarke playing in the lock position while South Sydney stayed with just 5 forwards and 8 backs. Souths ran out comfortable 21 to 5 winners. Clarke missed a try in the first half after his teammate “Brady mishandled”, though the two of them later “combined well and an infringement against the visitors saw Gregory kick a nice goal”. Towards the end of the match McDonald “missed an easy try by dropping a pass from Clarke”.

=== Auckland and North Island selection once more ===
The 1930 season saw Clarke play 14 times for Marist including a couple of appearances in the backs. In May he was chosen to train as part of the Auckland squad preparing for a match against Northland. He wasn't selected for the playing 13 but he did play for Auckland two weeks later on 31 May against South Auckland in a match for the Northern Union Challenge Cup. Auckland held it at the time but were defeated 13–12 at Carlaw Park with Clarke at lock.

In June Clarke once again made the North Island side to play against the South Island. The match was drawn 22-all before the “biggest crowd of the season”. Clarke scored a first half try “from a beautiful individual effort” and he “shone out on many occasions”. After the North Island had kicked a penalty “Clarke fielded the ball from the kick-off, raced right through the opposition, short-punted, and scored a spectacular try”. Craddock Dufty kicked the conversion from the side-line and the scores were level at 7-7. Clarke did however concede a penalty in the second half which the South Island goaled from to take a 17–9 lead before the North Island came back.

The New Zealand selectors had been watching the representative matches to choose the New Zealand team to tour Australia. Once again Clarke missed selection though he was chosen as emergency cover if any forwards were unable to tour. The Herald said that “the exclusion of Clarke, Marist, after his splendid game on Saturday is also a surprise. Clarke would make a much better third-row forward than Jones, South Auckland.

On 23 August Clarke had a chance to play against the New Zealand side after they had returned from their tour where they had performed disappointingly, winning just 5 matches and losing 7. New Zealand won the match 34 points to 27. The Auckland side did not play well aside from “in the loose, [with] Clarke and O’Brien being conspicuous for fast break-aways and raiding with the backs”. The NZ Truth newspaper said that “Alan Clarke is good enough for any Enzed team. He is as tough as nails. None of the Kiwi dreadnoughts could pace it out with him in the open”.

Four days later, on 27 August, Clarke played in a midweek match in the ‘Wednesday Competition’ for the Private Taxi's side against Trotting Trainers. His side lost though he did kick a conversion in the 26 to 10 defeat with several fellow senior players in each side.

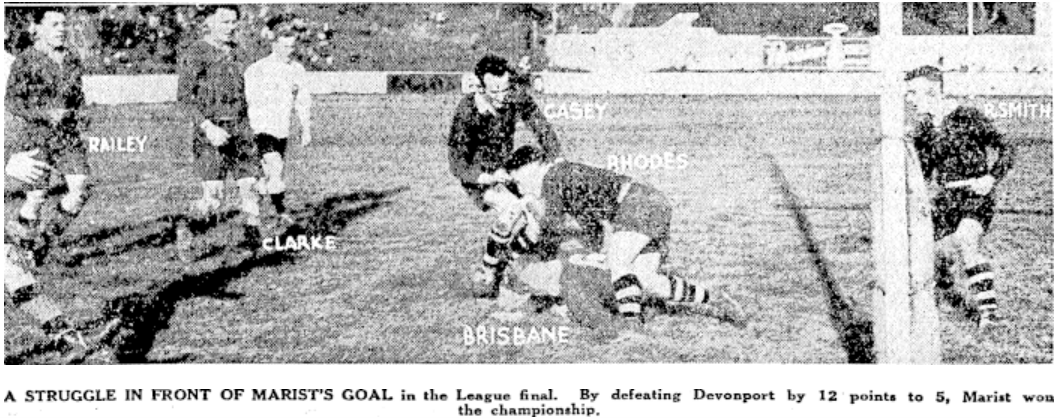
Clarke looming in support of tackled team mate Hec Brisbane in the championship deciding win over Devonport on 8 August 1931.

In 1931 Clarke began to take on more of the kicking duties for Marist. In 14 matches during the season he kicked 12 goals to go along with 3 tries. Marist won the Fox Memorial Shield when they took out the first grade competition with an 11 win, 1 loss record. Their final round match against Devonport decided the title with both teams tied on 20 competition points. Marist won 12 to 5 with Clarke said to have been one of those who shone and along with Johnson “did much to open up play for [the] backs”

He was then chosen to play for the North Island for the fourth and final time in his career. In total Marist had a remarkable eight players in the North Island side such was the quality of their senior side at the time. North Island side thrashed the South Island by 52 points to 23 with Clarke, playing lock scoring a try and kicking 5 conversions and a penalty for a 15-point haul. He was picked to play for Auckland against South Auckland (Waikato) but was ultimately unavailable for the match. His final match for the season was for a combined Marist and Devonport side against the touring Eastern Suburbs team. Clarke kicked a conversion and 2 penalties in a 14–13 win before 15,000 spectators at Carlaw Park.

=== New Zealand selection ===
The 1932 season saw Clarke finally make a long-awaited appearance for New Zealand. He also had a strong year for Marist, playing 15 games and scoring 5 tries, 26 goals, and a drop goal for a total of 69 points. In July he was chosen in an Auckland XIII to play South Auckland. The Auckland side won 29 to 13 with Clarke converting 4 of their 7 tries. The match was notable for being the rugby league representative debut of Bert Cooke who was one of the try scorers.

Clarke was chosen for the New Zealand Probables side to play Possibles in a trial to select the New Zealand team to play the touring English side. The match was a curtain-raiser to the North Island v South Island match. He scored a try in a 37–16 loss. He was chosen to train with the Auckland squad in the lead up to their match with England. England won before 15,000 spectators at Carlaw Park by 19 points to 14. He played in the second row and converted Cooke's late try and kicked 2 penalties. At the start of the second half Clarke replaced Trevor Hall in the back row. It was said that there was an improvement in Auckland's play after the change however Clarke also missed four shots at goal and the New Zealand Herald speculated that “a good place-kick would probably have won the match for Auckland”.

On 13 August Clarke played in Marist's final regular season match against Newton and kicked 2 goals. Marist had finished runner up to Devonport.

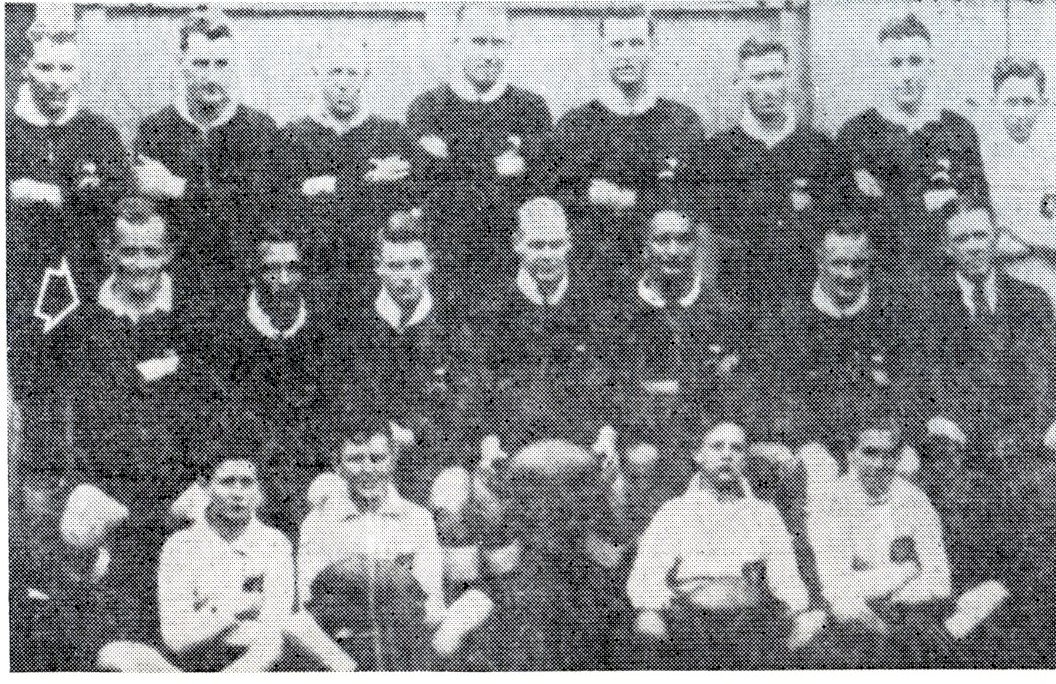
New Zealand 3rd test v England on 20 August 1932, with Clarke 4th from left in the back row

He was then chosen in the New Zealand side for the third test against England. England had already secured the series after 24 to 9, and 25 to 14 wins in the first two tests. The Auckland Star suggested he “should give the good service of which he is capable as breakaway”. In a hard-fought match the tourists beat New Zealand by 20 points to 18 before a crowd of 12,000 at Carlaw Park with a try in the final minutes. Clarke failed to convert Hec Brisbane’s first half try which had given New Zealand an 8-5 lead. New Zealand nearly scored in the second half after a high Clarke kick with Brisbane crossing the line but play was pulled up for a knock on. It was said after the match that Clarke along with Stan Clark “made a vast difference” to the New Zealand team.

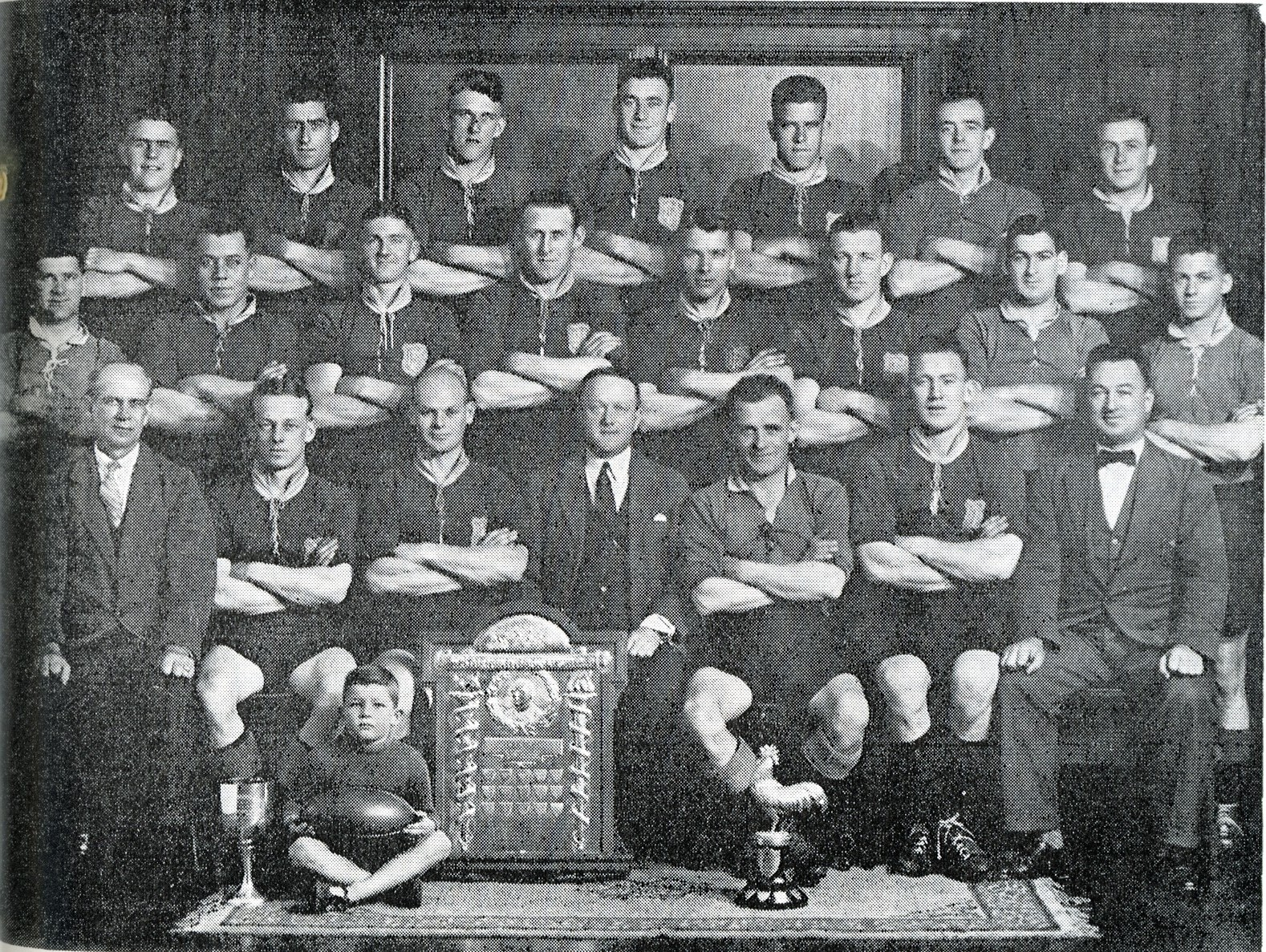
Marist 1932 with Clarke 4th from the left in the middle row

He finished the season by playing 4 more matches for Marist including a Roope Rooster final win over City by 28 points to 8 where he scored a try and kicked a conversion. He also kicked a penalty and a drop goal in a 15 to 8 win in the Stormont Shield final over Devonport United.

=== Retirement ===
The 1933 season saw Clarke only play a handful of matches for Marist. He played twice in May and once in mid-June, with his only points coming from a penalty in their match with Devonport. In 1934 he played more regularly but still only appeared in 10 matches, scoring 3 tries. His final ever appearance was for Marist against the touring Western Suburbs side who had won the New South Wales championship. Marist were narrowly defeated 21 to 19 with Clarke playing in the second row. He was fairly prominent in many moments in the match and the Auckland Star said that he along with Jim Laird, Keane, and Bakalich held their own in the rucks. The Herald also reported that Clarke, Laird, and Keane were the “best of the Marist forwards”. Clarke then retired a few weeks short of his 29th birthday after 13 seasons of first grade rugby league. He did however come out of retirement to play at lock for Marist in round 2 of the 1936 season and was said to have played well.
