= Charles Fitzgerald (rugby, born 1899) =

New Zealand dual-code rugby international player

Personal information
- Full name: Charles James Fitzgerald
- Born: 6 June 1899; Fairhall, Marlborough Region, New Zealand
- Died: 8 May 1961 (aged 61); Awatere Valley, New Zealand

Playing information
- Weight: 72 kg (11 st 5 lb)

Rugby union
- Position: Outside Centre, Second five-eighth (Inside Centre)
Club
Years	Team	Pld	T	G	FG	P
19??–22	Awatere
1923–24	Marist Old Boys
	Total	0	0	0	0	0
Representative
Years	Team	Pld	T	G	FG	P
1917–21	Marlborough
1922	South Island	1	1	0	0	5
1922	New Zealand	0	0	0	0	0

Rugby league
- Position: Wing, Centre
Club
Years	Team	Pld	T	G	FG	P
1924–??	Marist Old Boys
Representative
Years	Team	Pld	T	G	FG	P
19??	Canterbury
1924	New Zealand	2	0	0	0	0
1925	South Island

Charles James Fitzgerald (6 June 1899, in Fairhall – 8 May 1961, in Awatere Valley) was a New Zealand dual-code international rugby footballer who represented New Zealand in rugby union and rugby league. Fitzgerald was a utility back in both codes.

== Rugby union career ==
Fitzgerald represented Marlborough between 1917 and 1921, appearing for the union in every backline position except fullback. He played for a combined Nelson-Marlborough-Golden Bay-Motueka side against the 1921 Springboks kicking a penalty goal in the side's 26–3 defeat. In that game he lined up alongside fellow future dual-international Jim O'Brien.

Fitzgerald played for the South Island in 1922, scoring a try in the inter-island match. Following this he was selected for New Zealand, playing in five matches on a tour of New Zealand and Australia. Fitzgerald represented New Zealand (RU) in the 12–11 victory over Wairarapa at Carterton on 19 July 1922, the 26–19 victory over New South Wales at Sydney on 29 July 1922, the 24–6 victory over Metropolitan Union at Sydney on 2 August 1922, the 6–8 defeat by New South Wales at Sydney on 7 August 1922, and scored a penalty in the 45–11 victory over Manawatu-Wellington XV at Palmerston North on 16 August 1922 but never played a Test match for the New Zealand national rugby union team.

In 1923 Fitzgerald moved to Christchurch, joining the Marist Old Boys club. However the club was expelled from the Canterbury Rugby Union in April 1924 and Fitzgerald followed the club to play rugby league.

== Rugby league career ==
Fitzgerald excelled in rugby league and in his debut year he made the national side, playing in two Test matches against Great Britain. He played for the South Island in 1925.
