= Stan Clark (rugby league) =

New Zealand international rugby league footballer

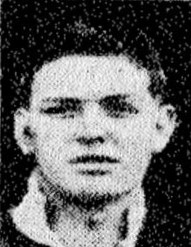

Personal information
- Full name: Stanley Peace Clark
- Born: 30 June 1908 New Zealand
- Died: 21 October 1958 (aged 50)

Playing information
- Weight: 14 st 2 lb (90 kg)
- Position: Prop
Club
Years	Team	Pld	T	G	FG	P
1926–28	Parnell	39	0	0	0	0
1929–36	City Rovers	95	10	0	0	30
	Total	134	10	0	0	30
Representative
Years	Team	Pld	T	G	FG	P
1930–34	Auckland	15	4	0	0	12
1930–32	New Zealand	9 (1)	2	0	0	6
1930–34	North Island	2	0	0	0	0
- Source: As of 28 August 2020

Stanley Clark (1907–1958) was a New Zealand rugby league player who represented New Zealand.

== Playing career ==
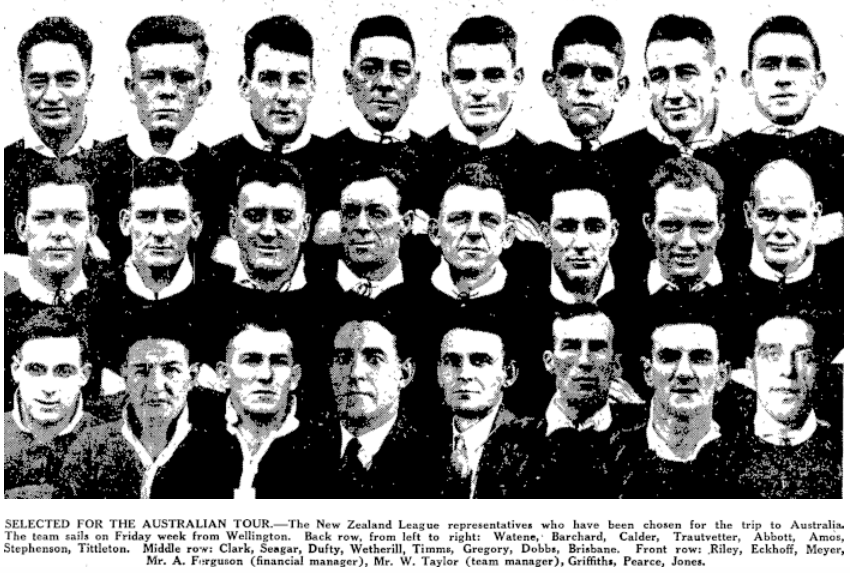

Stan Clark began his senior rugby league career with the Parnell club. He played in their top side in 1927 and 28 which was in the Senior B grade, effectively the 2nd division. At the start of the 1929 season he was granted a transfer to the City Rovers club where he made his debut at the opening match of the season.

Clark represented Auckland, playing against Northland in 1930. In 1930, Clark was selected as part of the New Zealand national rugby league team side that toured Australia. The team did not play in any test matches but Clark became Kiwi number 205.

During the 1932 season, Clark played for Auckland against the touring Great Britain Lions. He then played for New Zealand in his only test match, which was lost 18–20 at Carlaw Park.
