= Jim O'Brien (rugby, born 1897) =

NZ international dual-code rugby player

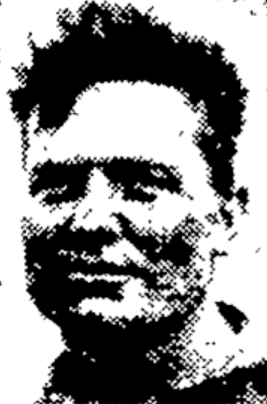

Personal information
- Full name: Andrew James O'Brien
- Born: 6 September 1897; Blenheim, New Zealand
- Died: 9 May 1969 (aged 71); Auckland, New Zealand

Playing information
- Weight: 87 kg (13 st 10 lb)

Rugby union
- Position: Hooker, Loose forward
Club
Years	Team	Pld	T	G	FG	P
1919–20	Opawa	16	1	4	0	15
1922–23	Grafton	20	3	9	0	22
1922	Harbour Board (employee)	1	1	0	0	3
	Total	37	5	13	0	40
Representative
Years	Team	Pld	T	G	FG	P
1919	Marlborough Trial	2	2	1	0	8
1919–21	Marlborough	9	4	6	0	25
1920	South Island Country	5	0	1	0	3
1921	Nelson-Marlborough-Golden Bay-Motueka	1	0	0	0	0
1922	North Island	1	0	0	0	0
1922	New Zealand	3	1	0	0	3
1922–23	Auckland B/A	8	2	2	0	12

Rugby league
- Position: Prop
Club
Years	Team	Pld	T	G	FG	P
1924–30	Marist (ARL)	87	30	22	0	134
Representative
Years	Team	Pld	T	G	FG	P
1924–30	Auckland	12	2	7	0	20
1924–28	New Zealand	14	3	0	0	9
1924	Auckland Province	1	0	0	0	0
1928	North Island	1	0	0	0	0
- Source: Scrum.com

Andrew James O'Brien (1897–1969) was a New Zealand rugby footballer who represented New Zealand with the All Blacks and in rugby league.

== Rugby union career ==
O'Brien began his career playing rugby union for Marlborough between 1919 and 1921. He also played for a combined Nelson-Marlborough-Golden Bay-Motueka side against the 1921 Springboks in the side's 26–3 defeat. In that game he lined up alongside fellow future dual-international Charles Fitzgerald.

In 1922, he moved north to Auckland, joining the Grafton club. He immediately was selected for the North Island side and subsequently the All Blacks tour of New Zealand and South Wales. He finished the tour having played in 3 games and scored one try. Returning to Auckland, O’Brien played his first game for the union late in the 1922 season. In 1923 he played five games for Auckland.

== Rugby league career ==
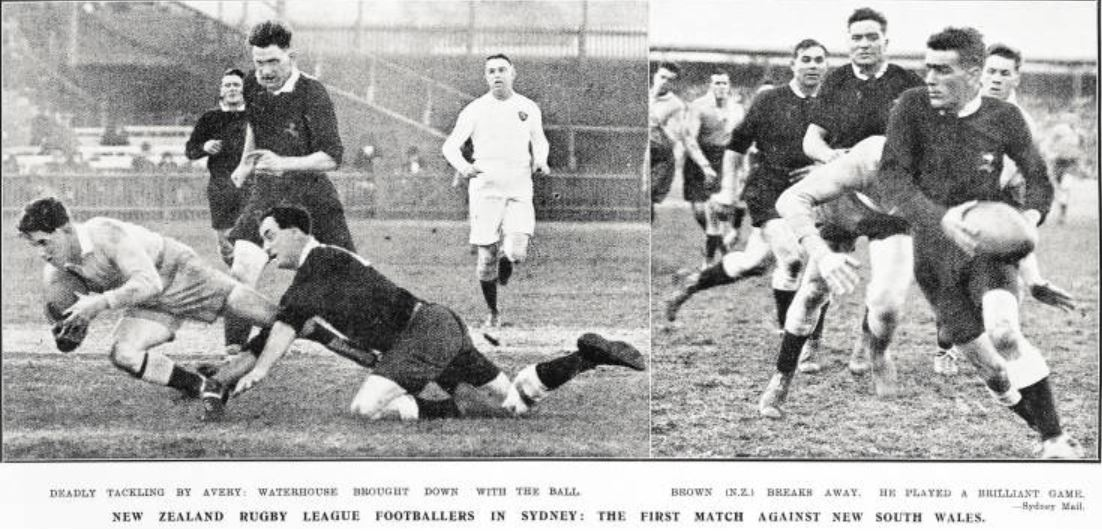
O'Brien in support of Lou Brown on 11 July against NSW at the SCG in 1925.

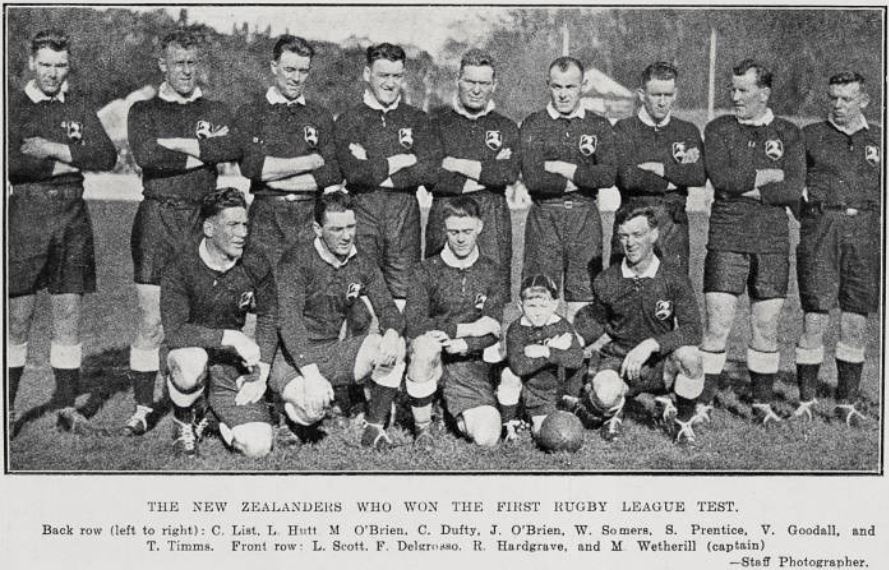
The NZ 1st test team at Carlaw Park on 4 August 1928 to play England.

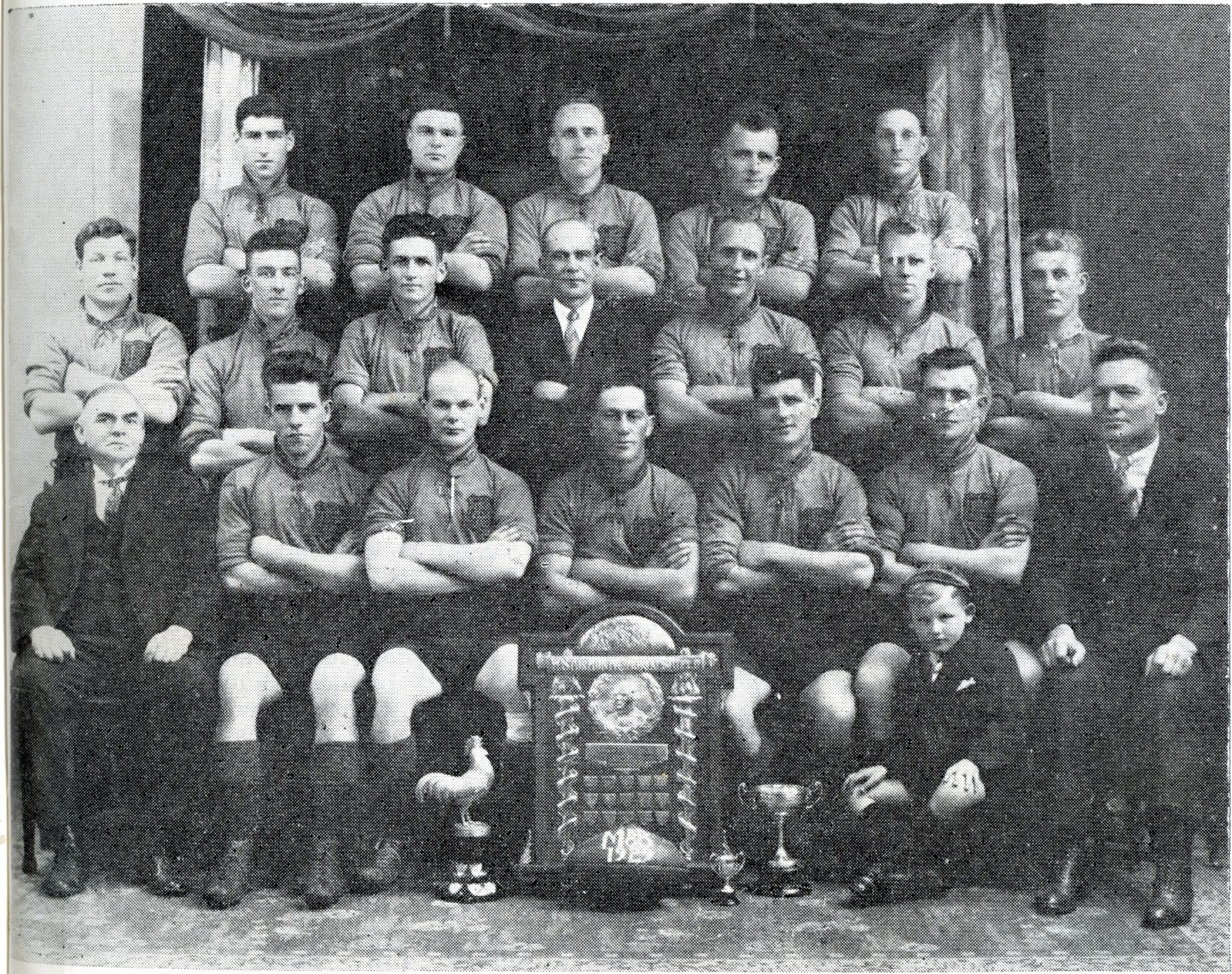
Marist in 1929, O'Brien is far right in the front row

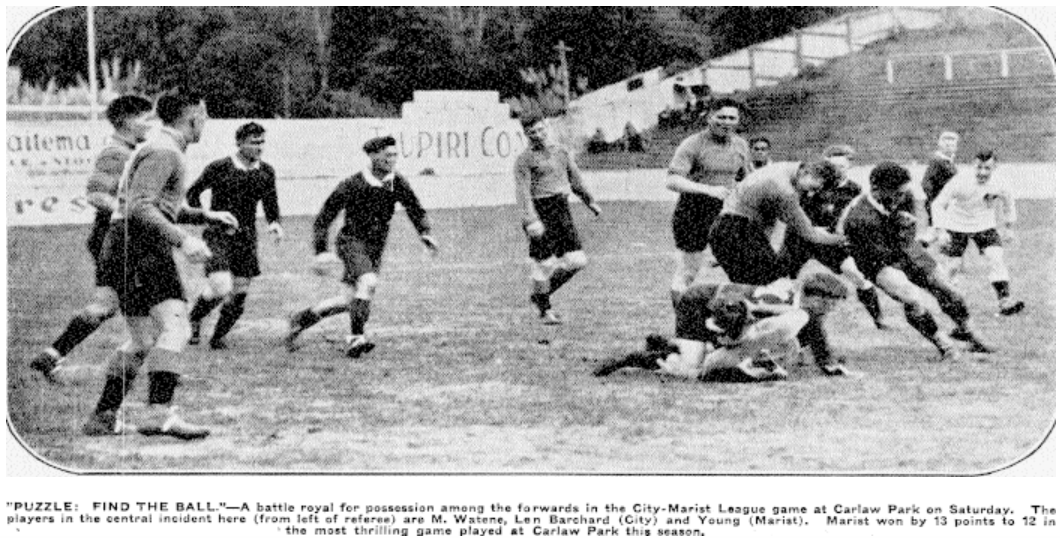
O'Brien standing upright behind the action with his legs obscured.

O'Brien switched to rugby league in 1924, joining Marist in the Auckland Rugby League competition. He played for Auckland and made the New Zealand national rugby league team for three tests against the touring Great Britain Lions side that year. He toured Australia in 1925 and gained another two Kiwi test caps playing against Great Britain when they toured again in 1928. In 1929, he served as the secretary of the Marist club.
