= Allan Seagar =

New Zealand international rugby league player (1903-1984)

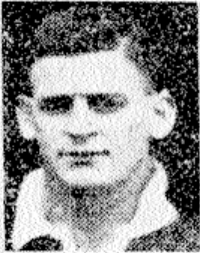

Personal information
- Full name: Allan Wilfred (Lar) Seagar
- Born: 20 June 1903 Auckland, New Zealand
- Died: 25 April 1984 (aged 80) Auckland, New Zealand

Playing information
- Weight: 71.7 kg (11 st 4 lb)
- Position: Stand-off, Centre, Fullback
Club
Years	Team	Pld	T	G	FG	P
1923–41	Devonport United/North Shore Albions	163	50	71	1	294
1932	Devonport-Marist	1	0	0	0	0
	Total	164	50	71	1	294
Representative
Years	Team	Pld	T	G	FG	P
1926–33	Auckland	13	11	3	0	37
1928	Auckland Trial	1	0	0	0	0
1928–32	New Zealand Trials	4	1	0	0	3
1929	North Island	1	0	0	0	0
1930	New Zealand	9	5	0	0	15
1932	New Zealand Presidents XIII	1	0	1	0	2
1932	Auckland XIII	1	0	0	0	0

Coaching information
Representative
Years	Team	Gms	W	D	L	W%
1933	Devonport United	16	10	2	4	63
1937–41	North Shore Albions	61	38	2	20	62
- Source: Papers Past = yes
- Relatives: George Seagar (brother)

Allan (Lar) Wilfred Seagar (20 June 1903 – 20 April 1984) was a rugby league player who represented New Zealand in 1930 (playing 9 matches), thus becoming New Zealand's 212th player. He also played for Auckland in 13 matches, and played from 1923 to 1941 for Devonport United (North Shore Albions), playing 159 matches. His brother George Seagar also represented New Zealand at rugby league; while his son Allan Herbert Seagar was a New Zealand champion swimmer, representing New Zealand at the 1962 and 1966 Commonwealth Games.

== Early life ==
Allan Seagar was born on 20 June 1903 in Auckland, New Zealand. His parents were Mary Waters and George Seagar. Allan was the youngest of 11 children along with his twin brother Leslie Waters Seagar. His other siblings were Irene May (1886–1968), George Bradley (1888–1968), William Charles Barten (1889–1952), Harold Edward (1891–1949), Albert Victor (1891–1933), Thomas Reginald (1894–1979), Ida Francis (1897–1967), Jessie Josephine Augusta (1899–1990), Gordon Huia (1901–1965), and Leslie Waters (1903–1984).

== Playing career ==
=== Devonport United (North Shore Albions) ===
Allan Seagar was listed in the Devonport United first junior team in 1922 while aged 19. By 1923 he had moved into their Second grade side, before making his top team debut in a 21 July match with Richmond Rovers where he scored a try in a 19–10 win. This was the only senior A match he played that season. He began the 1924 season playing again in Devonport's Second grade side; but on 12 July he moved into the senior side in their match with Marist Old Boys, the team they would ultimately finish runners up to in the championship. He scored 3 tries in their win over Athletic in round 17 and finished the season having played 6 matches for them. In the same year, he was selected for the Auckland Junior representative team, to play Hamilton at Carlaw Park on August 30, along with future New Zealand international Claude List. Auckland Juniors won 14-8. In 1925, he played in Auckland's first match of the season, scoring a try and kicking a conversion; however, this was the only match he played that season, for unknown reasons.

=== Auckland debut ===
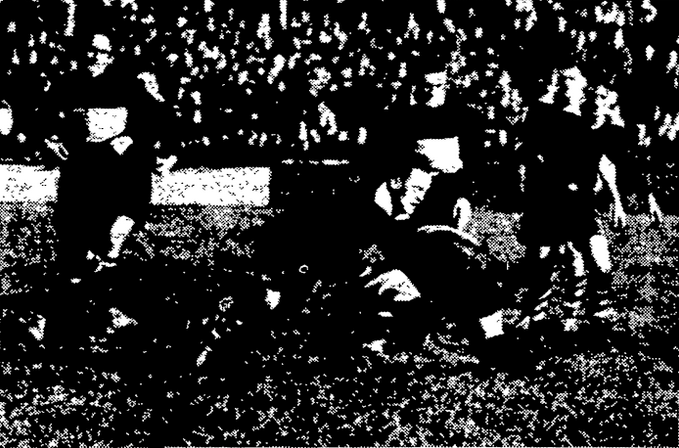
Seagar on the right a few yards from a tackle by team mate Stan Webb. H Riley is the Ponsonby player next to Seagar, while George Gardiner is on the extreme left.

From the 1926 season onwards he was to become a permanent fixture in the senior side for over a decade. At some point either in his youth or early career he had acquired the nickname 'Lar' and as a result he was regularly listed as "L Seagar" in team lists in the newspapers and in match reports. In 1926 he also made his representative debut for Auckland. He had played 12 matches for Devonport in the standoff position scoring 2 tries and kicking 3 conversions and then in early October he was named in the reserves to play against South Auckland on 9 October. He was given the opportunity as New Zealand had gone on tour to England and Wales and 13 Auckland players were away on the tour. He was said to have played very well in a 25–8 win at Carlaw Park in front of 3,000 spectators. He was involved in 2 tries scored by Claude List before he himself cut in on the 25m line and scored, and then in the second half he took a pass from Stan Prentice and scored under the posts. The Auckland Star wrote that Prentice and Seagar were "the most convincing five-eighth line that has been seen on the park this season and were brilliant in attack… Seagar [stood out] with elusive tactics and the use of the dummy ad lib made some wonderful openings". A week later he played in Devonport's Roope Rooster final loss to Richmond Rovers 16–15. Seagar's final match of the season was in the Auckland Colts side when they played a match against the B Division reps. The Colts won 24–17 with Seagar scoring a try and kicking a conversion in the five eighth position.

The 1927 season saw Seagar selected in the reserves for Auckland in a match against the Auckland members from the recently returned New Zealand side which had toured England and Wales. Though on this occasion he was not required to play. He played in 15 matches for Devonport, scoring 10 tries and kicking 10 goals including a charity match against Ponsonby in October where he scored 15 points from a try and 6 goals. On 15 October he made his second Auckland appearance in their 29–12 defeat to South Auckland in a Northern Union Challenge Cup match. Seagar scored a try in the loss. He had initially been named in the reserves but early in the game Payne was injured and so Seagar had to replace him and play in the forwards however he was said to have been given a "roving commission". He scored Auckland's last try near the posts after a movement involving Maurice Wetherill, Crewther, and O'Brien.

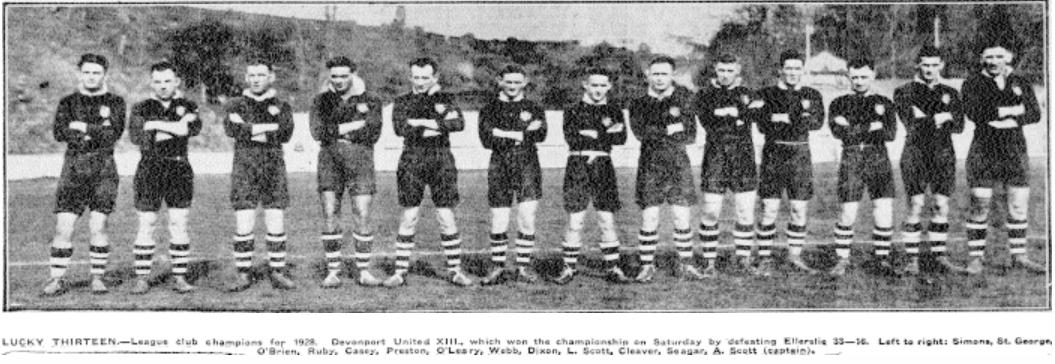

1928 saw Seagar very busy on the rugby league field. He played in 17 matches for Devonport scoring 6 tries and kicking 8 goals. Their highlight was their championship win with a 9 win, 3 loss record which they secured in the final round with a win over Ellerslie with Seagar converting 2 of their tries. It was their first championship win since 1914. They qualified for the Stormont Shield final match due to their championship win but went down 9–8 to Marist Old Boys.

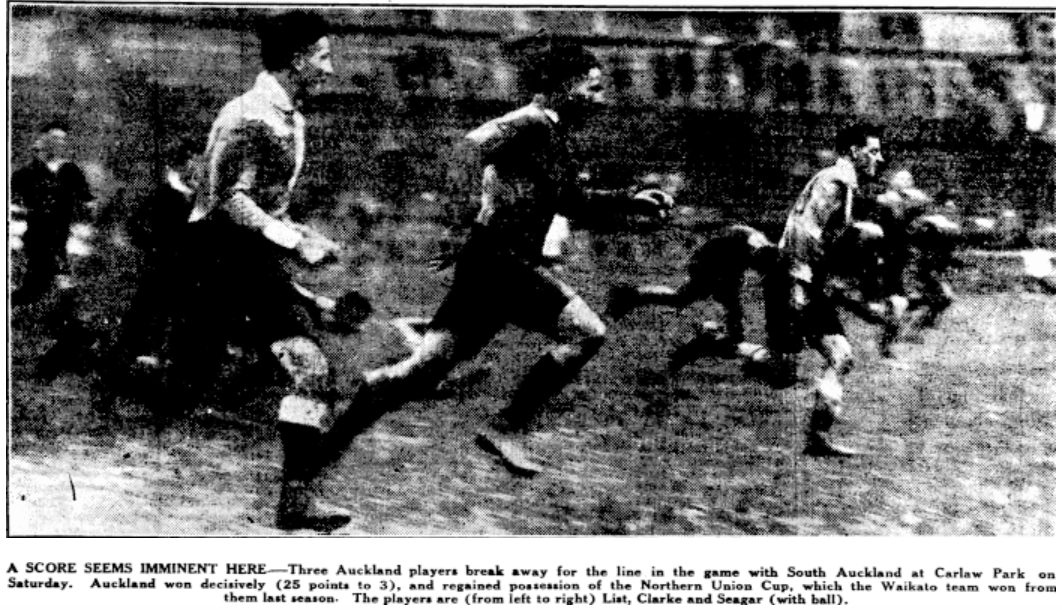

In June Seagar was selected to play for Auckland against South Auckland. This was his third time representing Auckland however his first time actually being named in the original starting thirteen. Auckland won 22–3 at Carlaw park before a crowd of 3,000. England were due to tour New Zealand in August and a series of trial matches took place over the preceding weeks. Seagar was chosen in an Auckland Probables side to play the Auckland Possibles on 11 July. His Probables side lost 24–14. He then played for Auckland against Canterbury on 21 July and scored 3 tries and kicked a conversion in a 66–26 win. Four days later he again played for Auckland in their 19–17 loss to South Auckland. He was named in the reserves for the North Island in their match against the South Island on 28 July but did not play. He was however picked to play a midweek game for the New Zealand Probables against the New Zealand Possibles. He scored a try in a 27–24 win at Carlaw Park. He ultimately missed selection for the New Zealand side and finished the representative season by being named a reserve for Auckland in their match with Otago and then played for Auckland against North Auckland on 6 October. Auckland won 33–9 in the match which was played in Whangarei.

=== North Island team appearance ===
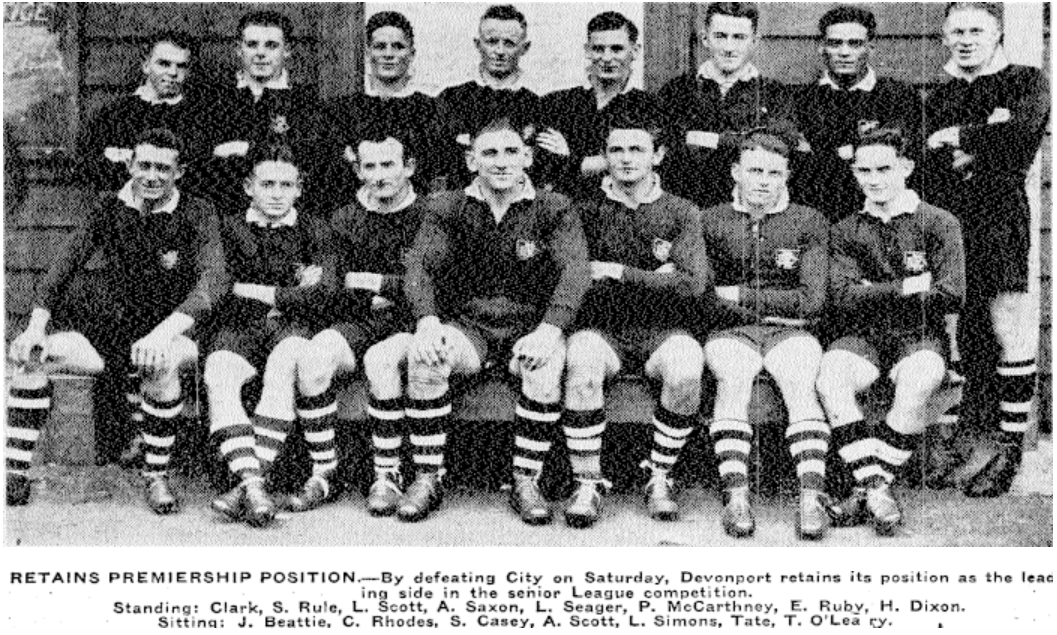
Devonport United 1929 side

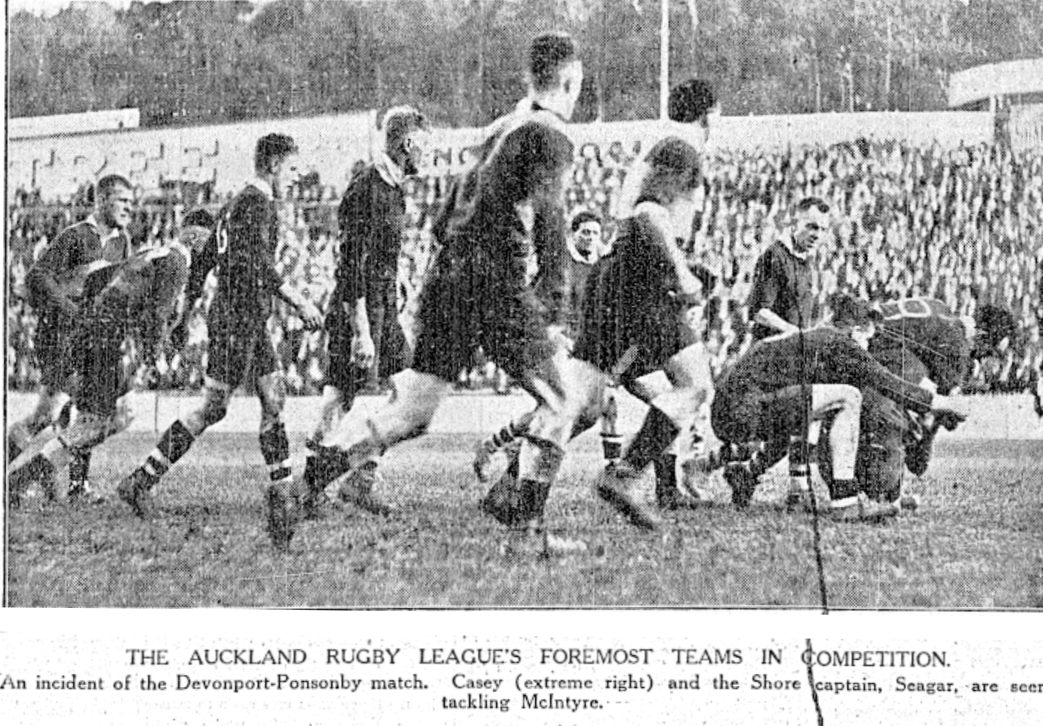

In 1929 Seagar played 14 matches for Devonport and scored 4 tries and kicked 12 goals. They finished runners up in the championship after losing the final to Ponsonby United 5–0 before a crowd of 10,000. He played for Auckland in their 11–8 win over South Auckland (Waikato) on 27 July. He then made two further appearances for Auckland on 17 and 24 August against Northland and Canterbury respectively. Auckland beat Northland 22–19 with Seagar scoring a try. He also scored a try in the 47–18 win over Canterbury. Then on 7 September he took the field as a replacement for the North Island side. He was originally named in the reserves but moved into five eighth after Len Scott left the field with Ted Meyer moving in to wing three-quarter. The South Island secured a rare victory over their northern counterparts by 22–13.

=== New Zealand selection and tour of Australia ===
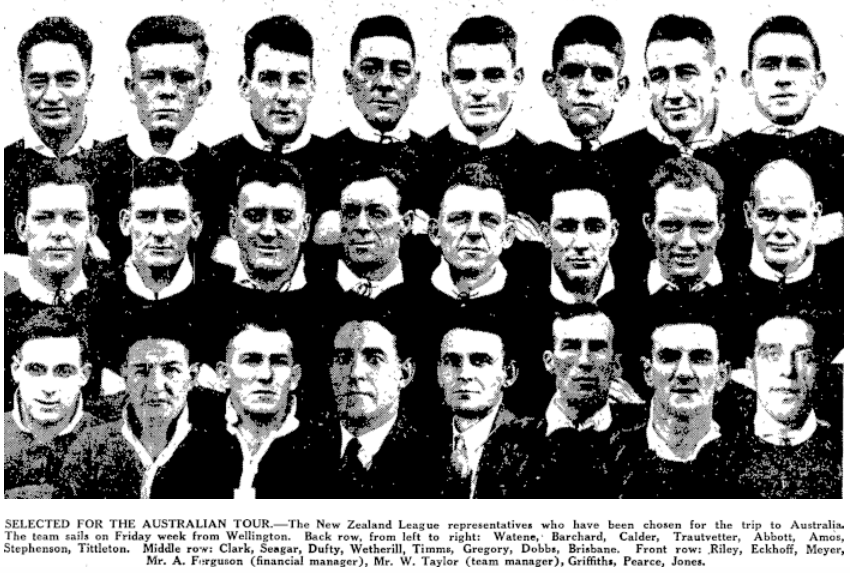

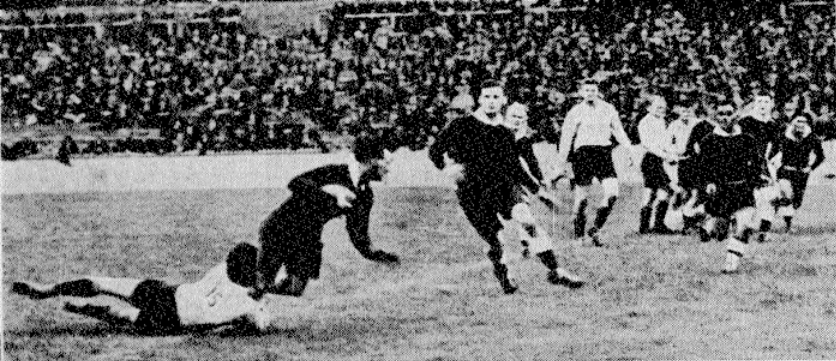
Seagar in support of Maurice Wetherill who is being tackled in the Auckland v Northland match

In 1930 Seagar was to make the New Zealand side for the first time. He played 10 matches during the season for Devonport, scoring 4 tries and kicking 4 goals. Devonport had finished runners up in the championship with City Rovers and so were forced to play off with them for the right to play Ponsonby United who had won the championship and the Roope Rooster, for the Stormont Shield. Devonport defeated City 18–17 and then beat Ponsonby in the Stormont shield match 17–5 with Seagar scoring 2 tries and kicking a conversion and a penalty. It was the first time in the clubs history that they had won this trophy.

With New Zealand touring Australia in July and August representative matches began to be played relatively early in the season to assist in the selection of the New Zealand squad. On 17 May he played in the five eighths along with Maurice Wetherill. Auckland won 21–16 over Northland in front of a large crowd of 8,000 at Carlaw Park with Seagar kicking a conversion and a penalty. Then on 31 May he was again partnered with Wetherill in the five eighths positions once again. He kicked a conversion but Auckland went down 13–12. On 14 June he played in a New Zealand Possibles side against the New Zealand Probables which was a curtain-raiser to the North Island v South Island match. His Possibles side were well beaten 28–3 whoever it was said that he and Tim Peckham were the only Possibles backs who were not disappointing. He had clearly impressed the selectors enough to be named in the New Zealand squad for their tour who selected the side later that evening. Seagar was generally regarded to have been a surprise selections ahead of the likes of Johnny Dodds, though ultimately Dodds made the tour anyway after Riley could not tour. The New Zealand Herald said that he "is a sound defensive player who has played good games in representative football [however] his form has not been good as of late".

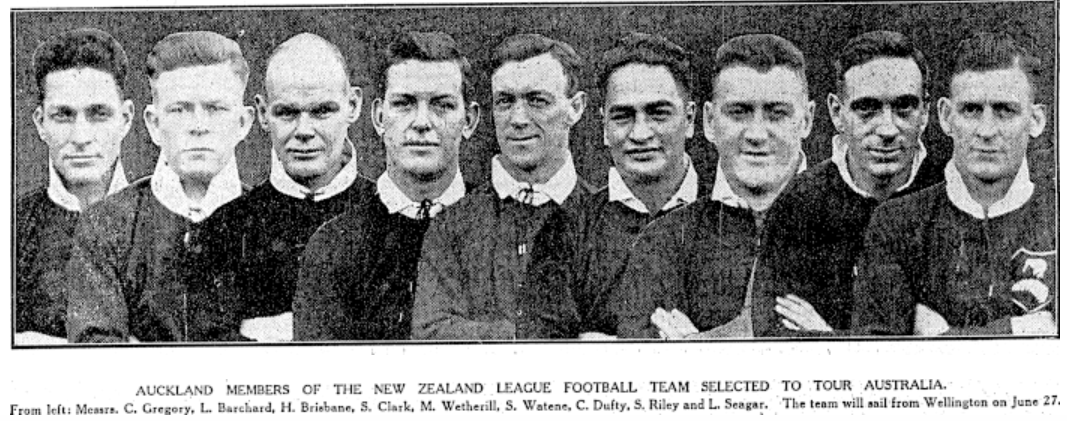

The team departed for Sydney from Wellington on 27 June on board the Ulimaroa. Seagars first appearance on tour was in New Zealand's 4th match of the tour against New England (Armidale) on 16 July. He was named out of his normal position in the five eighths in the three quarters along with Hec Brisbane and Steve Watene. New Zealand won the match 34–19 at Armidale Sports Ground. His next appearance was in the 6th match of the tour against Ipswich which saw New Zealand play poorly and lose 10–3 with Seagar in the halves. Seagar then scored his first try in a New Zealand jersey in a match against Brisbane on 30 July. He played in the three quarters and New Zealand won 19–17 before a crowd of 2,000 at the Brisbane Exhibition Ground. His try came on the end of a "fine movement started by Eckhoff in the home twenty five". He played on the wing for the next match against Metropolis at the Sydney Sports Ground on 2 August. New Zealand were defeated 39–22 in a fast, open match. Seagar scored a try in the second half after intercepting a pass with Metropolis on New Zealand's try line and putting in a "fine run" with even the "speediest of opponents" failing to stop him. Metropolis Seconds was the opponent 2 days later on 4 August with Seagar this time in the centres. The tour was not going well in terms of crowds with only 2,000 attending the match, and little revenue being generated. New Zealand had led 18–10 at halftime before collapsing late and losing 34–22.

Seagar played in his 4th straight tour match when he turned out against Southern Division on 6 August in the centre position. New Zealand won 24–20 with Seagar scoring his third match of the tour after passing play with Craddock Dufty and Charles Gregory. The crowd was an improved one with 5,000 turning up to the Young Showground. Seagar played against Newcastle on 9 August in a match at the Newcastle Showgrounds which saw New Zealand win a close game again by 23 points to 22 before 4,000 spectators. He again took the field for the 6th straight time on 19 August when New Zealand played their final match of the tour against Universities. New Zealand won 18 to 12 before 1,500 at the University Oval #2 with Seagar said to be amongst New Zealand's best players. He was involved in New Zealand's first try after kicking through and after a scramble for the ball Jim Amos scored and Craddock Dufty converted to give New Zealand a 5–0 lead.

After their return to New Zealand they played Auckland at Carlaw Park on 23 August. Seagar scored 2 tries from the centre position in an entertaining 34 to 27 win. He was also involved in tries to Abbott and Jones and was said to have played "splendidly, proving most elusive on attack". The Auckland Star reported that "Seagar as pivotal centre played right at the top of his form. At times he ran rings around the defence and scored two nice tries. Seagar is perhaps the most improved player in the team". It was also commented in the New Zealand Herald that "the Devonport five-eighths Seagar is one of the most improved players in the New Zealand team. He did some really clever work on attack and never once kicked the ball. Seagar should do better as a centre, in which place he played against Auckland. He is a much faster back than is generally thought".

=== Devonport United and Auckland ===
In 1931 Seagar had a busy season with Devonport. He played 17 matches, scoring 8 tries and kicking 11 goals, making him the 3rd highest individual points scorer for the season, behind Frank Delgrosso and Pat Meehan. His club finished runners up in the championship, the first year that the Fox Memorial Shield was up for competition. The Auckland Star wrote on 1 June that Seagar was one of "the finest tacklers in the code". On 19 September he scored 2 tries in his club's 34–17 Roope Rooster final win over Ponsonby United. Then on 3 October, he scored 2 tries and kicked 5 goals in the 25–6 Stormont Shield final win over Marist Old Boys. This gave him the most points scored by an individual for the match, up to that point.

On 10 October Seagar had the opportunity to captain Devonport against the touring Eastern Suburbs side who were touring. An enormous crowd of 15,000 was on hand at Carlaw Park to witness the touring side defeat Devonport by 41 points to 27 with Seagar scoring an "opportune" try. A week later he played in a combined Devonport-Marist side against Eastern Suburbs. The Combined side scored a 14–13 win over the tourists before 15,000 spectators at Carlaw Park once more.

Seagar's only representative appearance of the season was for Auckland against Northland. It was their only match in the season and Seagar was named captain of the side. Northland gained a surprise draw in the match at Carlaw Park with Seagar scoring a try from an intercept while playing in the centre position. He also kicked a conversion which had given Auckland a 19–14 lead.

The 1932 season saw Seagar play 14 matches for Devonport, scoring 2 tries and kicking 11 goals along with the only drop goal of his career in a round 2 match with Richmond Rovers. Devonport won the Fox Memorial Shield for the first time in their history, though it was their fourth first grade title. They lost the Stormont Shield match against Marist 15–8.

England was touring New Zealand later in the later part of the season and a series of trial matches were played to select the New Zealand team. Seagar played in the Auckland Probables team on 23 July against the Possibles. He played in the centres in a 26–12 win and was said to have played a "splendid game" and was involved in much of the attacking play. A week later on 23 July he played for the Auckland Probables side again against the Possibles however this time his side lost 37–16. Seagar failed to gain selection for the New Zealand team and was also not selected for the Auckland side to play England after making the training side and being named in the reserves for the match but not playing. He was however chosen for a New Zealand XIII side to play England in Wellington on 18 August. The New Zealand XIII were thrashed 59–8 though they had to play with 12 men after Lou Hutt broke his thumb early in the match. Seagar kicked a conversion. At the end of the season Seagar played in an Auckland XIII against Marist Old Boys in a benefit match to raise funds for W. Hanlon to assist him in returning to New Zealand from England.

=== Coaching Devonport ===
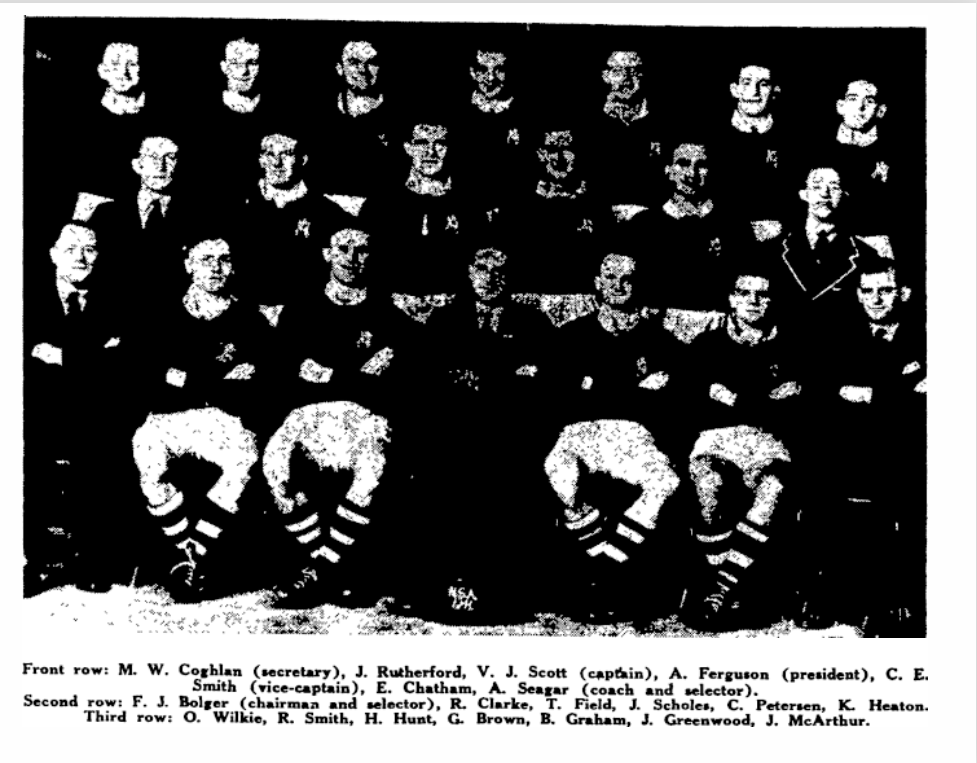
Allan Seagar as coach of the Fox Memorial Shield championship winners in 1941

It was announced in 1933 that Seagar would coach the Devonport side. He had 'retired' from playing however in round 8 he was named to play in their match with Newton Rangers. He played at five eighth and was part of a 11–5 win. At the time they were narrowly ahead in the title race and with a draw over Richmond in round 9 and a win over City Rovers in round 10 by 17 points to 12 they secured back to back titles. Seagar scored 2 tries in the final round must win match. They also won the Stormont Shield once again with an "epic grand final win" by 12–7 over Richmond on 16 September. Devonport were again given the opportunity to play against an Australian touring side when they played St. George on 23 September. Devonport lost 19–8 before 9,000 spectators at Carlaw Park with Seagar involved in their second try which had narrowed the score to 14–8.

He only played one representative match in the season once more which was for Auckland against Taranaki on 5 August. The match was played at Western Park in New Plymouth and saw Auckland win the Walmsley Shield with a 25–17 victory. He was named in the reserves for Auckland's match against North Auckland on 12 August but did not take the field. He was named in the reserves for Auckland's match against West Coast on 26 August but once again was not required to play.

In the following 1934 season he was elected to the Devonport Committee at their annual meeting. He was possibly considering not playing as a season preview in the New Zealand herald said that an effort was being made to get him to play. He did indeed take the field in their opening round match and played 15 matches, scoring 2 tries and kicking 1 goal.

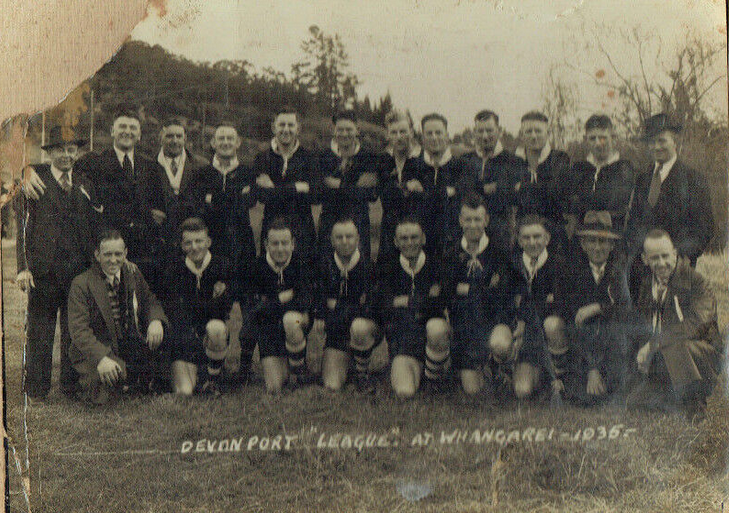
Seagar in the 1935 Devonport team that played Whangarei in September at Jubilee Park

Then in 1935 he did not play until round 3; however he then went on to play 13 games scoring 2 tries and kicking 6 goals with some of his appearances being in the fullback position. He was once again elected to the Devonport committee in 1936. He had 'retired' once more but came out of it again in round 5 on 30 May when he came into the side as a last minute replacement for Jordan and was said to be out of shape. He did however score a try in a 29–15 win over city Rovers. By this point of his career he was just days away from his 33rd birthday. He played 11 matches and scored 4 tries.

In 1937 he had officially retired and his only involvement with Devonport was as a committee member. In 1938 he played one match for Devonport who had now changed their name to North Shore Albions which they had been known as in the early part of their history prior to a merger with Sunnyside. The match was against Manukau on 26 June and was due to Jack Zane-Zaninovich being injured. He was 35 at this point though remarkably he was still to play one more match for North Shore before he was finally finished. In 1939, 1940 and 1941 he was the coach and selector of the senior side and in a 1941 match with Papakura on 4 September he came on to replace an injured player. North Shore under his leadership went on to win the championship for the 6th time in their history. It was to be the last time they ever won the title.

In 1940 Seagar had been picked in an Auckland Veterans against their South Auckland counterparts. In 1941 he again played in a veterans match, this time for an 'All Golds' team against South Auckland. Then in a round 17 match between North Shore and Papakura he came on as an injury replacement for Brown in the forwards in a 35-8 win. He was again named North Shore's senior coach in 1942.

== Personal life and death ==
Allan Seagar was a member of the "Seagar Brothers" family. They owned a well known engineering company that constructed steam launches, among other things, and later supplied the United States Navy with a composite cargo vessel during World War II. Allan married Alice Clark on 8 April 1925. They had a son named Desmond in 1925. (Alice later has a miscarriage in 1929.)

In 1938 Seagar lost his father, George, who died in July. Obituaries were published for him in both the Auckland Star and The New Zealand Herald, including details of his life, work in business, and involvement in rugby league. The following year, Alice gave birth to a second son, named Allan Leslie Seagar; however, he died 5 months later, on 6 February 1940. At the time, Seagar and his family were living at 38 Bond Street in Devonport. Tragedy struck again on 17 December 1942, when Alice died at Auckland Hospital, aged just 36. At the time of her death the family was living at 19 Bond Street, Stanley Bay.

In the early 1940s, Seagar worked as a storeman. After the death of Alice, he married again in 1943 to Dulcie Simmonds. They had a son named Allan Herbert Seagar on 7 September 1944.

By the 1960's, Allan Seagar (the son) had become a New Zealand and Australian swimming champion. He won the Australian 440 Yards Individual Medley in 1964; he held the New Zealand national title for the 440 Yards Individual Medley for eight consecutive years (1961–1968); and he held national titles over several years in the 220 Yards Individual Medley and the 220 Yards Backstroke. He represented New Zealand at both the Perth Commonwealth Games in 1962 and the Kingston Commonwealth Games in 1966. In Perth, he placed fifth in the 440 Yard Individual Medley and ninth in the 110 Yard Breaststroke. In Kingston four years later, he placed fourth in the 440 Yard Individual Medley, fourth in both the 110 Yard Breaststroke and the 220 Yard Breaststroke, and eighth in the 220 Yard Backstroke. He later became heavily involved with the Piha Surf Life Saving Club.

Allan Seagar (the father) died 25 April 1984. His son (Allan Herbert Seagar, the swimmer) died in Auckland on 17 September 2018.
