= Lou Petersen =

New Zealand international rugby footballer (1897–1961)

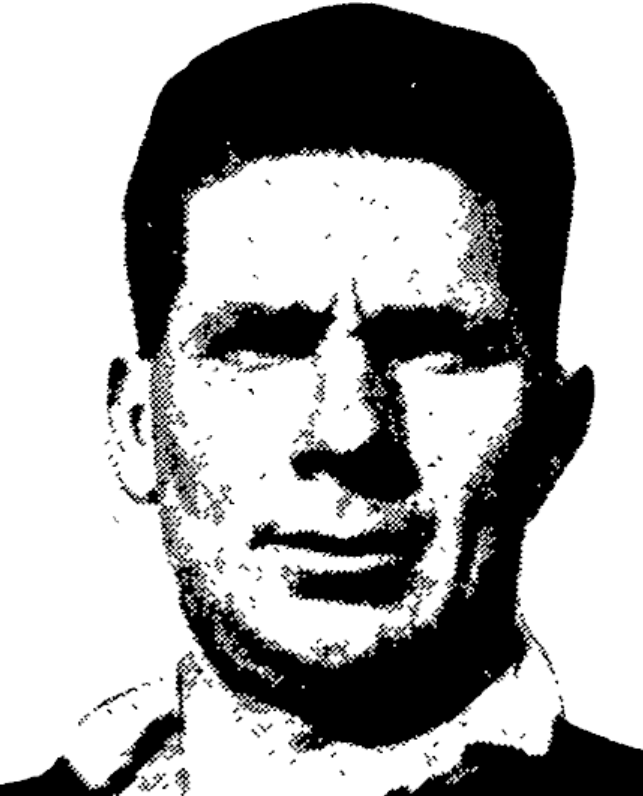

Personal information
- Full name: Louis Charles Petersen
- Born: 19 April 1897 Akaroa, New Zealand
- Died: 25 June 1961 (aged 64) Christchurch, New Zealand

Playing information
- Weight: 81 kg (12 st 11 lb)

Rugby union
- Position: Loose forward
Club
Years	Team	Pld	T	G	FG	P
19??–24	Marist Old Boys
Representative
Years	Team	Pld	T	G	FG	P
1919–23	Canterbury	19
1921–23	New Zealand	0	0	0	0	0

Rugby league
- Position: Second-row
Club
Years	Team	Pld	T	G	FG	P
1924–26	Marist Old Boys
Representative
Years	Team	Pld	T	G	FG	P
1924–26	Canterbury
1924–27	New Zealand	3	1	0	0	3
1926	South Island	1
- Source: Scrum.com

Louis Charles Petersen (19 April 1897 – 25 June 1961) was a dual-code rugby footballer who represented New Zealand in rugby union and rugby league.

== Early years ==
Petersen served with the New Zealand Expeditionary Force in World War I and it was here that he developed his football skills, playing for the "Trench team".

== Rugby union career ==
Petersen began his career with the Marist Old Boys club in Christchurch and in 1919 was first selected to represent Canterbury. He made the South Island side in 1919, 1920 and 1921.

In 1922 Petersen was called up to the All Blacks and he played in eight games for New Zealand, although he did not appear in any Test matches.

In 1924 Marist Old Boys became locked in a dispute with the Canterbury Rugby Union and quit, instead fielding rugby league and soccer teams. Petersen followed the club, taking up rugby league.

== Rugby league career ==
Petersen made an immediate impact and was one of the six Marist Old Boys players who were selected to represent New Zealand that season. In total, Petersen played in three Test matches for New Zealand in rugby league. He captained Canterbury in 1925 and played for the South Island in 1926.

Petersen was part of the 1926–1927 tour of Great Britain that was marred by strike and he was one of the seven players suspended for life by the New Zealand Rugby League on his return. The ban was lifted in 1962, one year after Petersen's death.

== Death ==
Upon his death in 1961, the Press wrote a lengthy obituary detailing his skills as a rugby and rugby league player. It was mentioned that his nickname have been "Big Pete".
