= Hec Brisbane =

New Zealand rugby league footballer

Hector William Brisbane
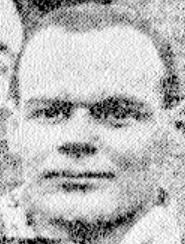

Personal information
- Born: 19 November 1904 Auckland, New Zealand
- Died: 26 March 1963 (aged 58) Onehunga, Auckland, New Zealand

Playing information
- Height: 5 ft 9 in (1.75 m)
- Weight: 11 st 9 lb (74 kg)
- Position: Centre, Stand-off
Club
Years	Team	Pld	T	G	FG	P
1923–34	Marist Old Boys	155	61	3	0	189
Representative
Years	Team	Pld	T	G	FG	P
1923–33	Auckland	14	9	1	0	29
1924–32	New Zealand	50 (10)	21 (5)	6 (0)	0 (0)	75 (15)
1924	Auckland Province	1	1	0	0	3
1928–32	North Island	5	7	0	0	21
1928	New Zealand XIII	1	1	0	0	3

Hector Brisbane (1904–1963) was a New Zealand professional rugby league footballer who represented New Zealand.

== Playing career ==
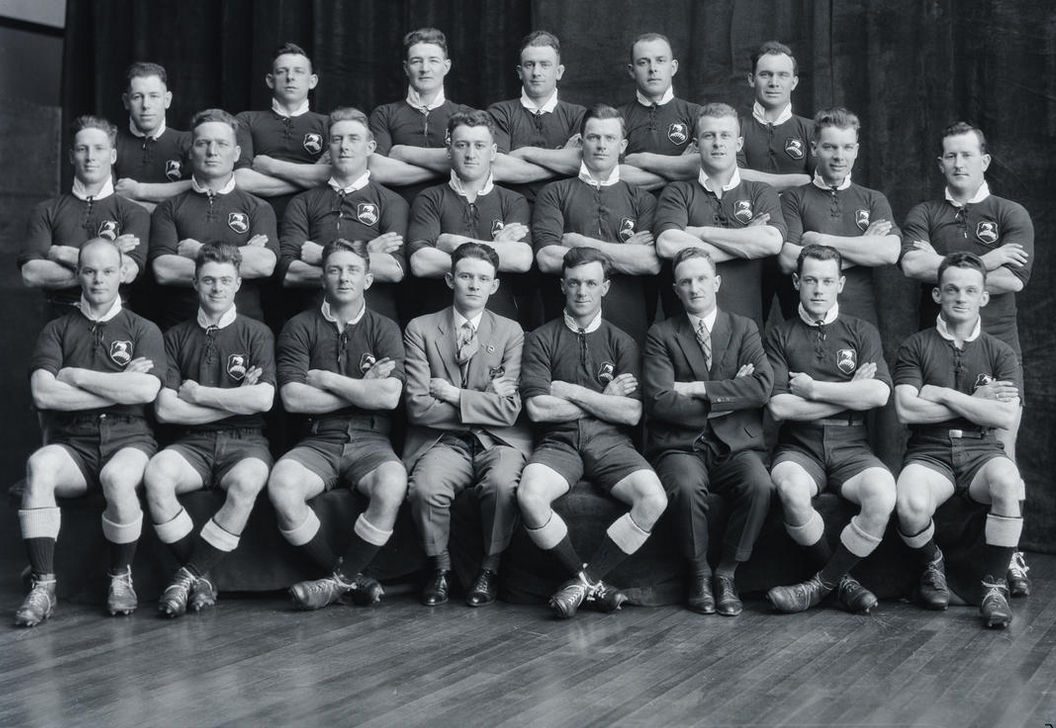
The 1928 NZ team with Brisbane in the front row on the left.

Brisbane played for the Marist Old Boys in the Auckland Rugby League competition debuting in 1923. He had previously played for Ellerslie United as a junior. In 1924, Brisbane represented Auckland City against the touring Great Britain Lions. He then made his debut for New Zealand, becoming Kiwi number 153.

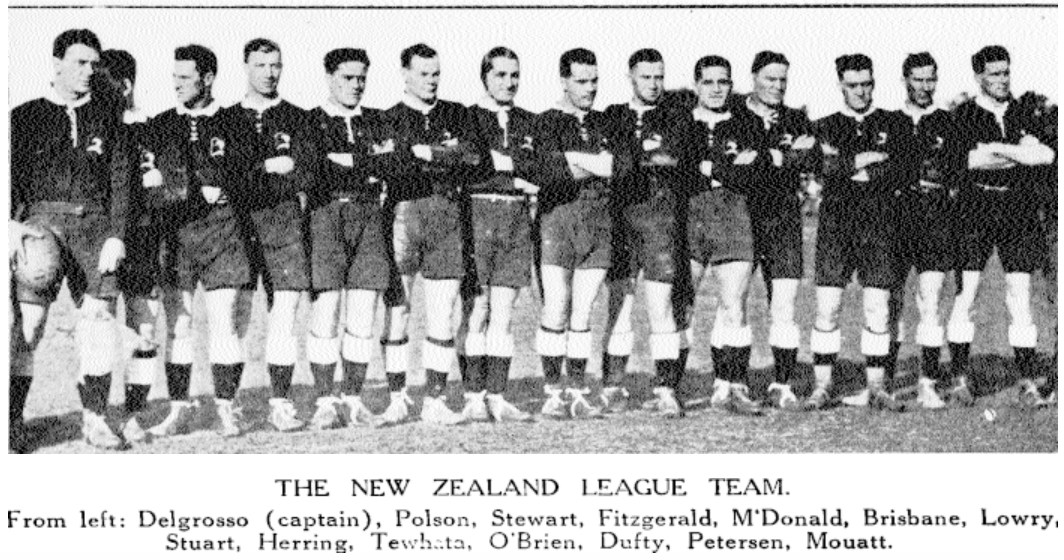

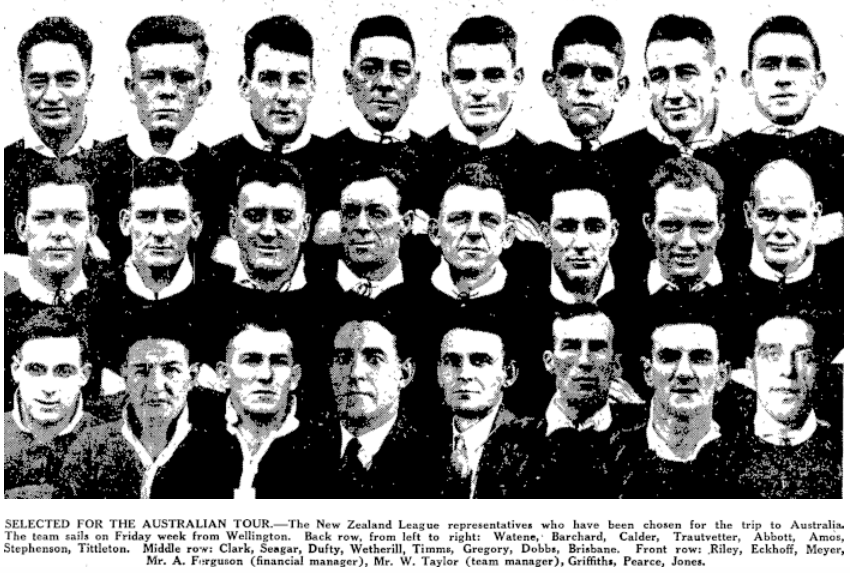

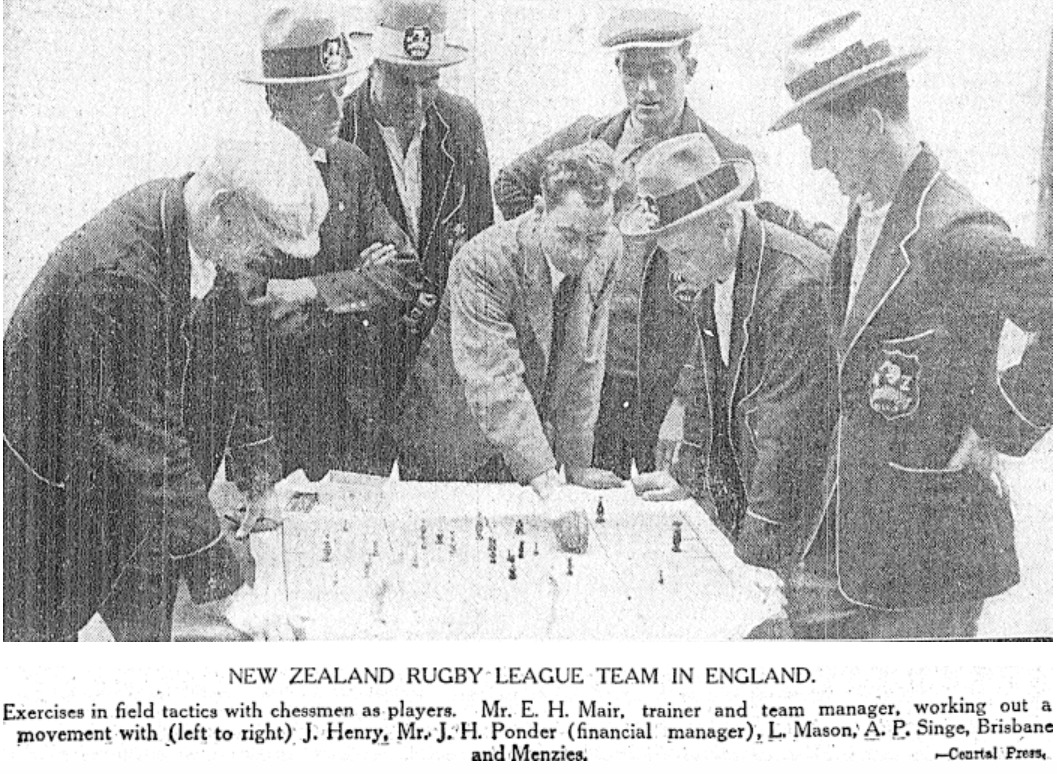

He was a part of the 1926–27 New Zealand rugby league tour of Great Britain, which was marred by the strike action by six of the forwards including Marist teammate Arthur Singe.

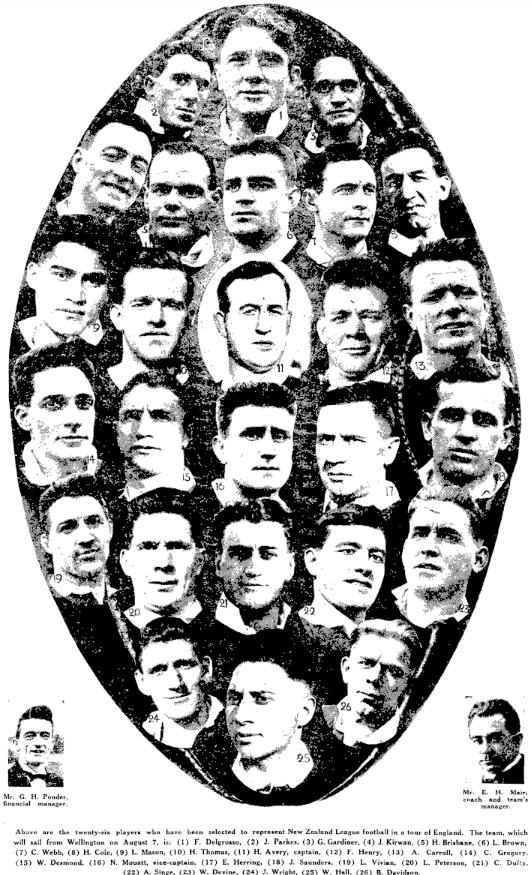
The NZ team to tour England and Wales in 1926-27 with Hec Brisbane in the 2nd from top row, 2nd from left.

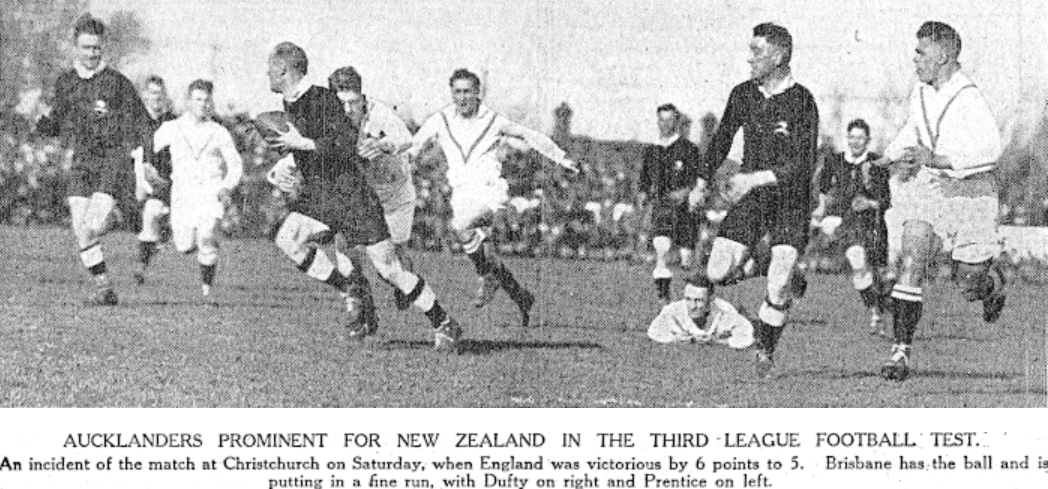
Brisbane with the ball after a break in the 3rd test against England in 1928 at Christchurch. He is looking to pass to Stan Prentice, with Craddock Dufty on his outside.

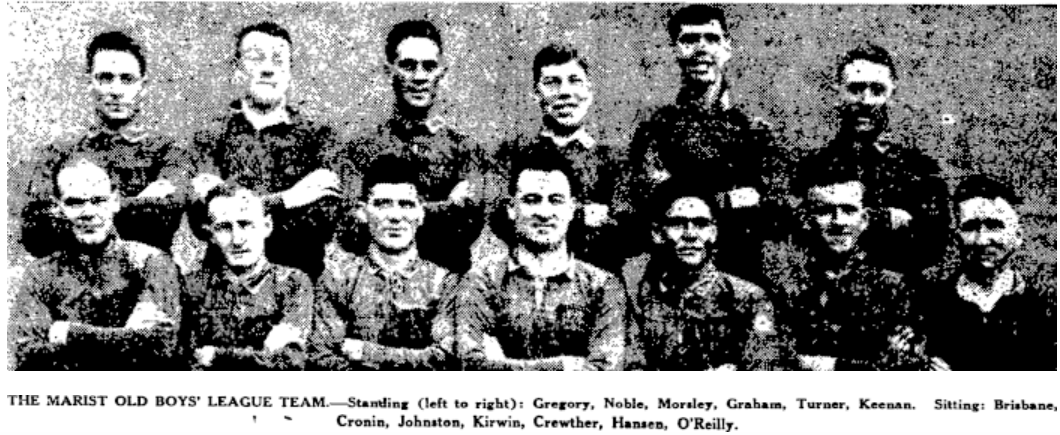
Marist in 1927.

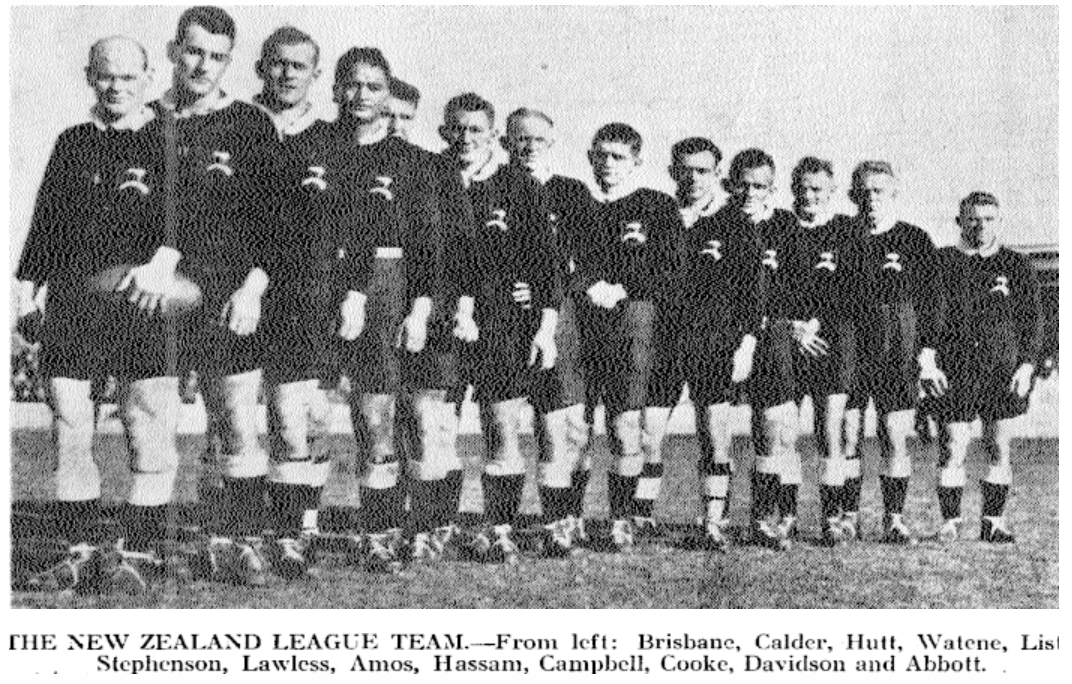

During the 1932 New Zealand rugby league season, Brisbane captained New Zealand to a 0–3 series defeat by Great Britain on the 1932 Great Britain Lions tour. In the third test, Brisbane scored two tries but New Zealand lost 18–20.

At the end of the 1934 season Brisbane had decided to retire and Marist played a benefit match in his honour against Newton Rangers.

== Personal life and death ==
Hec Brisbane was the son of Julia and William Brisbane. He had an older sister Hazel Evelyn (b. 1902), a younger brother Albert (b. 1906), and a younger sister Zena (b. 1913).

Hec married Christina Slater Brisbane in 1940. She died in 1957.

Hec Brisbane died on 26 March 1963, and was buried at Waikaraka Cemetery in Onehunga. His second wife Helena died in 1967. His mother Julia died in 1968, aged 87.
