= 1930 Auckland Rugby League season =

The 1930 season of Auckland Rugby League was its 22nd. It was generally regarded that the season was very disappointing in terms of the quality of the football played and much of the blame was put down to the fact that too many teams were in the Senior A Grade and there was too much talent spread through the Senior B teams which in turn diluted the top division. There had been a noticeable drop in the attendances at matches at Carlaw Park which had seen 8 to 10 thousand regularly attending club matches. A review of the season was published in The New Zealand Herald on 22 October discussing the issue.

The Senior A championship was won by Ponsonby United for the second consecutive year which was their fifth title overall. They were awarded the Monteith Shield. This was the last year that the Monteith Shield was played for as the man this trophy was named after suggested that the main championship trophy should be one named in honour of Mr. Edwin Vincent Fox who had died earlier that year. Ponsonby also won the Roope Rooster trophy for the sixth time after defeating Richmond Rovers by 15 points to 7 in the final. Ponsonby were however beaten by Devonport United in the final of the Stormont Shield 17–5. This was the first time Devonport had won the Stormont Shield. A week later on 11 October Ponsonby played the champions of the South Auckland competition who were Ngaruawahia in the first match of its kind. Ponsonby won 32 to 29.

The Senior B championship was won by Otahuhu who beat the 1929 champions Point Chevalier in the final by 3 points to 0. The Stallard Cup knockout competition for Senior B teams was won by Richmond who defeated Point Chevalier 21–11 in the final. Richmond were the first club to enter a B team (effectively a reserve grade team) in this grade, and for the Stallard Cup they were joined by a B team from Devonport.

Preceded by 1929	22nd Auckland Rugby League season 1930	Succeeded by 1931

== Season News ==
=== Club teams by grade participation ===
Team	1st	Senior B	2nd	3rd Open	3rd Int.	4th	5th	6th	7th	Schools	Total
Richmond Rovers	1	1	1	1	1	1	1	1	2	2	12
Devonport United	1	0	1	1	1	1	0	1	1	1	8
Ponsonby United	1	0	1	1	0	1	1	0	0	1	6
Marist Old Boys	1	0	1	1	0	0	1	2	1	0	7
Kingsland Athletic	1	0	0	1	1	1	0	1	0	0	5
City Rovers	1	0	0	0	0	1	0	1	1	1	5
Northcote & Birkenhead Ramblers	0	1	0	0	1	0	1	0	1	1	5
Ellerslie United	1	0	0	1	0	0	0	1	1	1	5
Otahuhu Rovers	0	1	1	0	0	0	1	0	0	2	5
Point Chevalier	0	1	0	0	0	1	0	1	1	0	4
Glen Lynn	0	0	0	1	0	1	0	1	1	0	4
Mount Albert United	0	1	0	0	1	1	0	0	0	1	4
Newmarket	0	0	0	0	1	0	1	1	0	1	4
Avondale	0	0	0	1	0	1	0	0	1	1	4
Parnell	0	1	0	0	.5	.5	.5	0	0	.5	3
Newton Rangers	1	0	0	0	0	0	0	1	0	1	3
Māngere United	0	1	1	0	0	0	0	0	0	1	3
Papatoetoe	0	0	0	0	0	1	1	0	0	1	3
Akarana	0	0	0	0	.5	.5	.5	0	0	.5	2
Mount Wellington	0	0	1	0	0	0	0	0	0	0	1
Avondale Convent School	0	0	0	0	0	0	0	0	0	1	1
Onehunga Convent (St Joseph's School)	0	0	0	0	0	0	0	0	0	1	1
Total	8	7	7	8	7	11	8	11	10	18	95

=== News ===
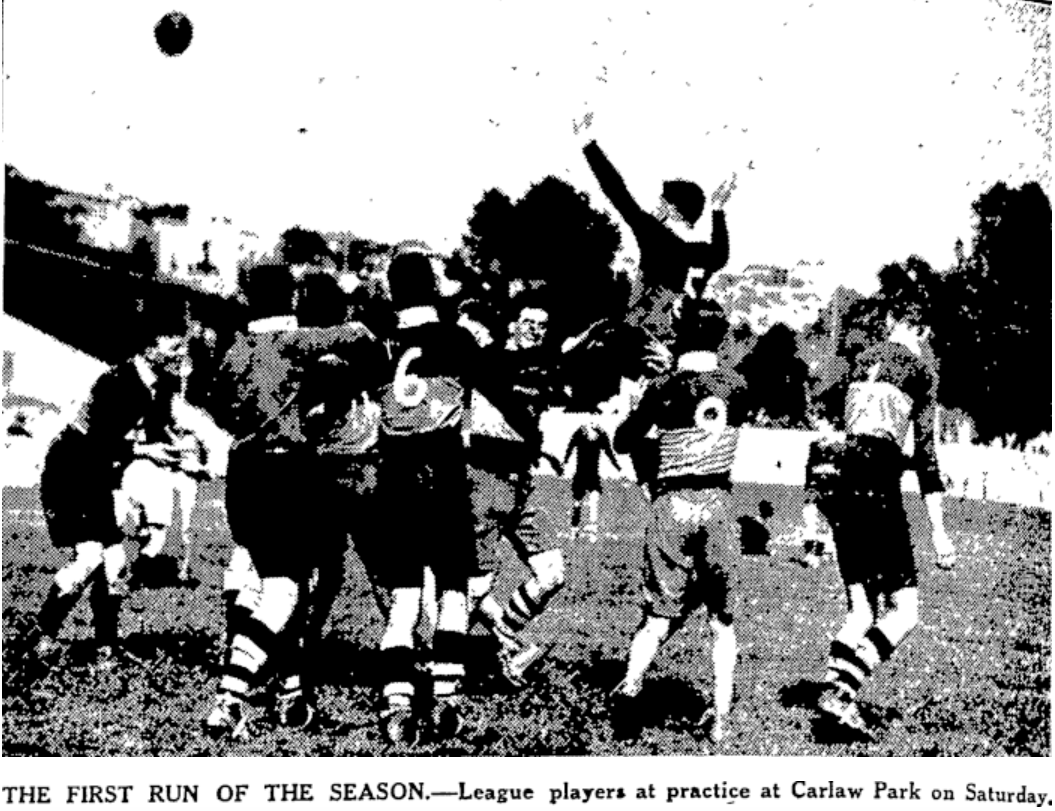
Preseason training at Carlaw Park involving City Rovers players

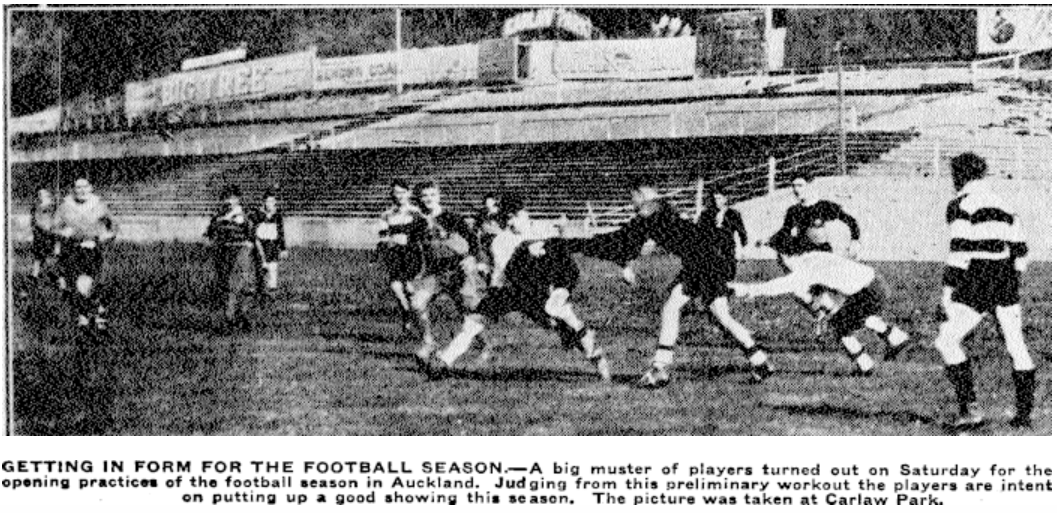
Preseason training on Carlaw Park #2 with the terraces in the background

In a major scandal following the Stormont Shield match between Ponsonby United and Devonport, Frank Delgrosso, the Auckland and New Zealand representative who was captain of the Ponsonby team was suspended for three seasons. Delgrosso was charged with misconduct along with another Ponsonby player V. Goodwin. They were also barred from attending Carlaw Park in the future. He failed to make a teammate who had been ordered off to leave the field, threw mud at the referee, and abused him.

Mt Albert was a new addition to the B Grade competition by entering a team there for the first time. This was their first senior grade team. They had won the Second Grade competition the previous year and were essentially ‘promoting’ the team.

The Auckland Rugby League placed a tender for its “Auckland Rugby League Programme and Gazette” for the 1930 season.

Prior to the season opening games the Auckland Star ran a piece on the prospects of each A Grade team and the players it had acquired.

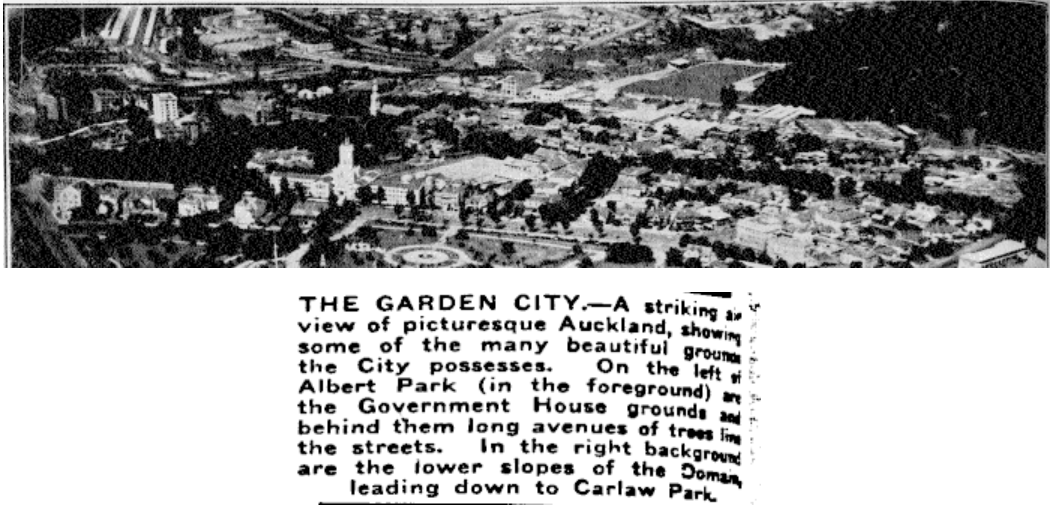

=== Criticism of the standard of 1st Grade ===
As the season progressed much talk was made about the standard of the Senior A Grade and its inability to field enough sides of quality. The decision was eventually made to reduce the number of A Grade sides to 6 and to do away with the Senior B competition altogether for the following season. Instead the league would encourage good quality players to move from those sides to clubs with A Grade teams. A special committee was formed to suggest a way forward. They decided to recommend that the six teams to make up the A Grade for the 1931 season should be Ponsonby, Marist, Devonport, Metropolitan (to include City and Newton), Western Suburbs or Richmond, and Eastern Suburbs (to include Ellerslie). There was much discussion of the matter by members of various clubs over which clubs should merge or who disagreed that their club should disappear. The matter was further discussed in a Management Committee meeting on 15 October but a decision was deferred for a week. On 29 October it was decided by the Auckland Rugby League to officially reduce the number of teams in the Senior A Grade to 6. The clubs would be known as Ponsonby United, Devonport, Marist Old Boys, Western Suburbs (Richmond Rovers and Kingsland), Metropolitan (City and Newton), and Eastern Suburbs (Ellerslie and the surrounding district). This was not to be the only time that Auckland Rugby League went down the path of making teams, who were often unwilling, into mergers. It happened again decades later before reverting to the norm, and then again in the 1990s before once again reverting to the norm with standalone clubs. Clubs who were particularly against the proposal were City Rovers, Newton Rangers, Kingsland Athletic, and Richmond.

=== New venue ===
Papakura hosted its first ever rugby league match when Richmond 2nd Grade and Newmarket 2nd Grade played there at the end of the season. Richmond won 20–10.

== Obituaries ==
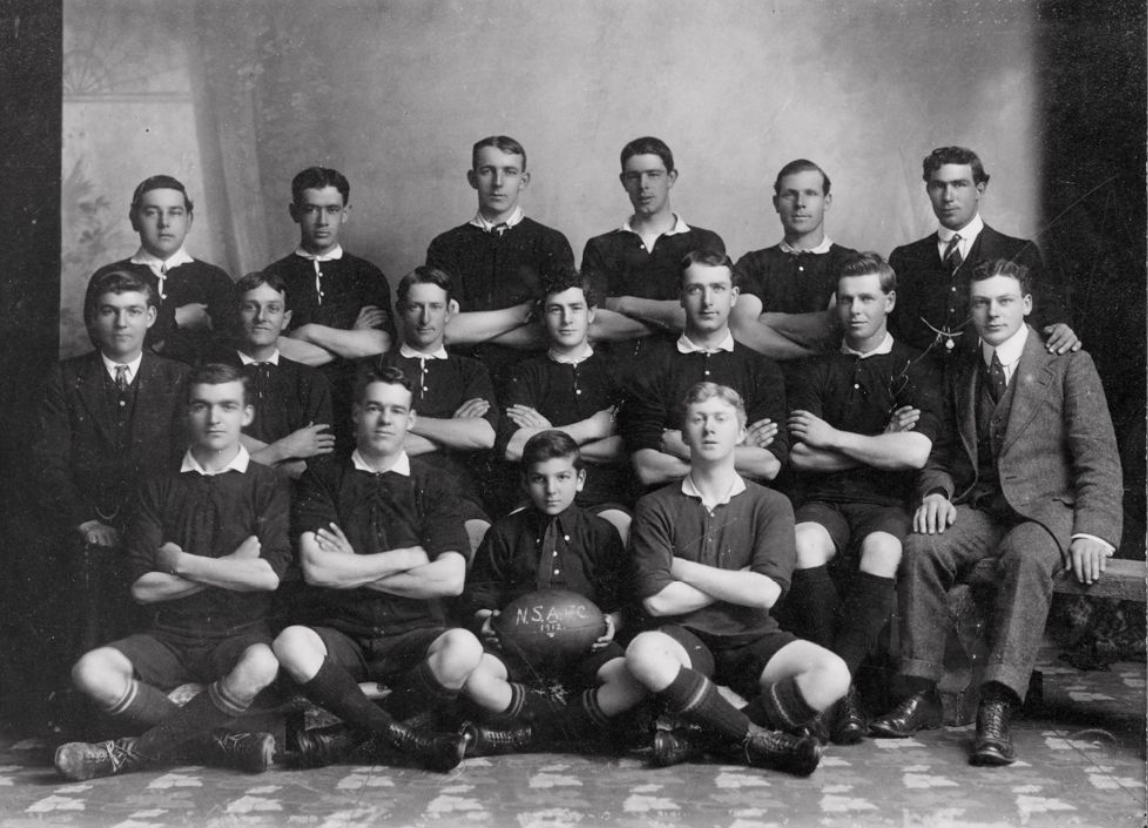
Fox in the back row, 3rd from left in the North Shore 2nd grade side of 1912

Edward Vincent Fox

On 24 February Mr. Edward Vincent Fox died. He was a member of the Devonport team before World War I and played inside five-eighths for Auckland against England. In 1913 he enlisted in the war efforts and fought in the front lines. He was shot in the leg and when he returned to Auckland was unable to play again. He was appointed to the executive of Auckland Rugby League and was a selector for the Auckland and New Zealand teams. He was buried at O’Neill's Point Cemetery on the North Shore, New Zealand. In 1931 his family donated a shield for the league and it was decided to have it played for in the first grade competition. It was named the Fox Memorial Shield and is still played for today.

== Monteith Shield (first grade championship) ==
=== Monteith Shield standings ===
Team	Pld	W	D	L	F	A	Pts
Ponsonby United	13	11	0	2	190	138	22
City Rovers	13	7	2	4	206	175	16
Devonport United	13	8	0	5	151	128	16
Marist Old Boys	13	6	3	4	200	147	15
Newton Rangers	13	4	1	8	142	193	9
Kingsland Athletic	13	4	1	8	113	156	9
Ellerslie United	13	4	1	8	141	171	9
Richmond Rovers	13	4	0	9	118	156	8

=== Monteith Shield fixtures ===
==== Round 1 ====
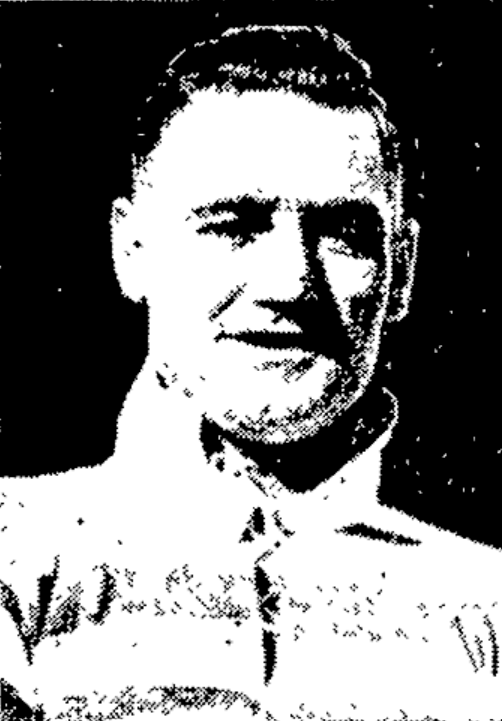
Claude Dempsey

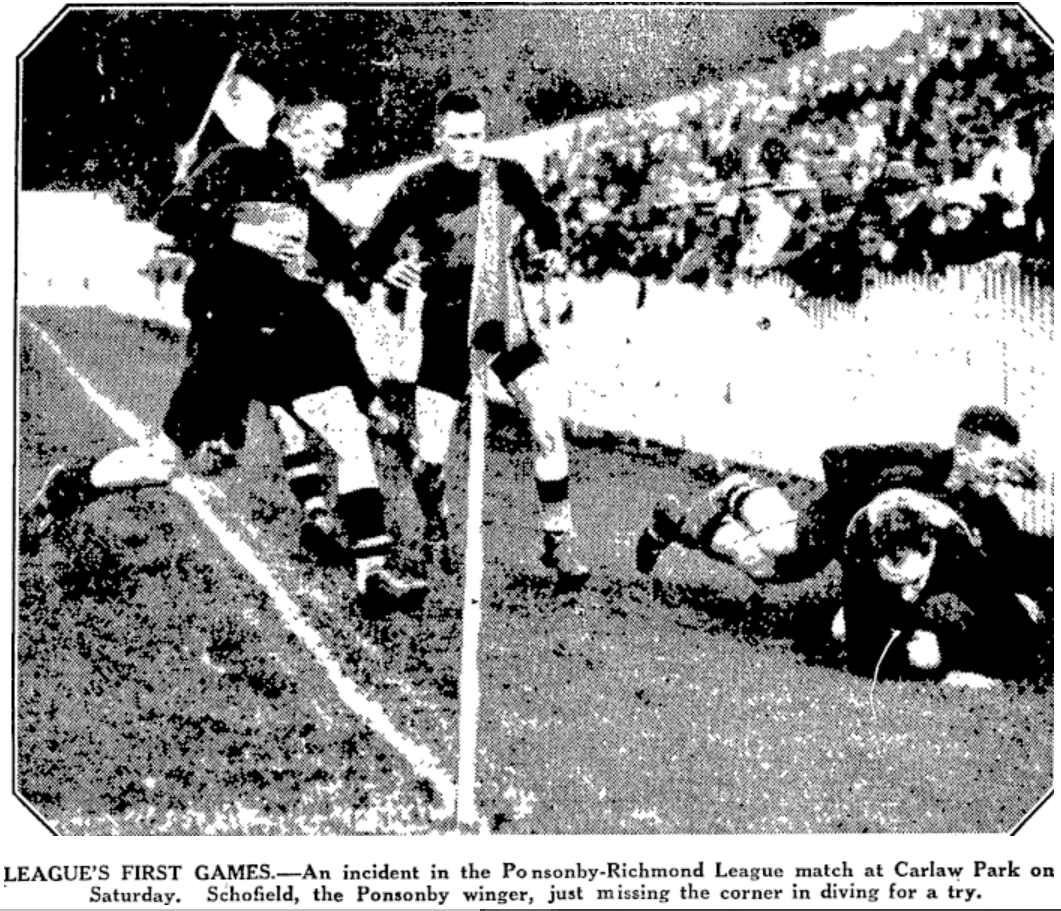

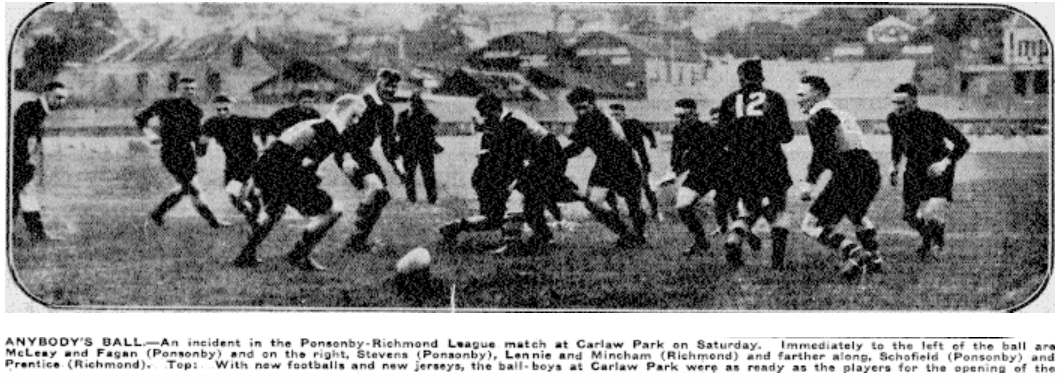
Ponsonby v Richmond.

Marist Old Boys victory over Kingsland Athletic was contested by Kingsland over an unregistered player (Robert Munro) playing in the match. He had come across from the Mt Albert 3rd grade team. The protest was upheld and Kingsland were awarded the match. Marist Old Boys appealed to the New Zealand League Council but the decision was upheld by that body also. Kingsland Athletic, who wore maroon jerseys with a blue and gold crest were forced to play in the George Court House jerseys which were amber and black (likened to Taranaki rugby) as their new jerseys had not yet arrived. Craddock Dufty (Ellerslie) was ordered from the field for allegedly disputing a referees decision on a possible forward pass which led to the tying City Rovers try near the end of the match. He was "severely cautioned" by the management committee during the week. Claude Dempsey made his debut for Newton after switching from the Marist rugby union club. He would go on to play 11 seasons for Newton and in 1936 became Kiwi #246 when he played at fullback for New Zealand against England.

26 April	Ponsonby	15-14	Richmond	Carlaw Park 1
3:00	Try: L Winters, Cyril Thompson, A Schofield; Con: Frank Delgrosso 2 Pen: Frank Delgrosso		Try: J Potter, Tim Peckham; Con: L Taylor; Pen: L Taylor 3	Referee: Percy Rogers

26 April	City	12-12	Ellerslie	Carlaw Park 1
1:30	Try: Laurie Barchard, William McLaughlin, George Perry, Ben Davidson		Try: C Capner, Wally Somers; Con: J Hemingway 2 Pen: J Hemingway	Referee: Bertie Emirali

26 April	Kingsland	13-16*	Marist	Carlaw Park 2
3:00	Try: Carter 2, R D Revell; Con: Ralph Longville 2		Try: Phil Brady 2, Bernard Sweeney, George Batchelor; Con: Charles Gregory; Pen: Charles Gregory	Referee: William Mincham

26 April	Devonport	16-8	Newton	Devonport Domain
3:00	Try: Horace Dixon, Les O’Leary, H A Tate 2 Con: Les O’Leary 2		Try: Ferguson, A McLeod; Con: Cyril Brimble	Referee: Vic Simpson

==== Round 2 ====
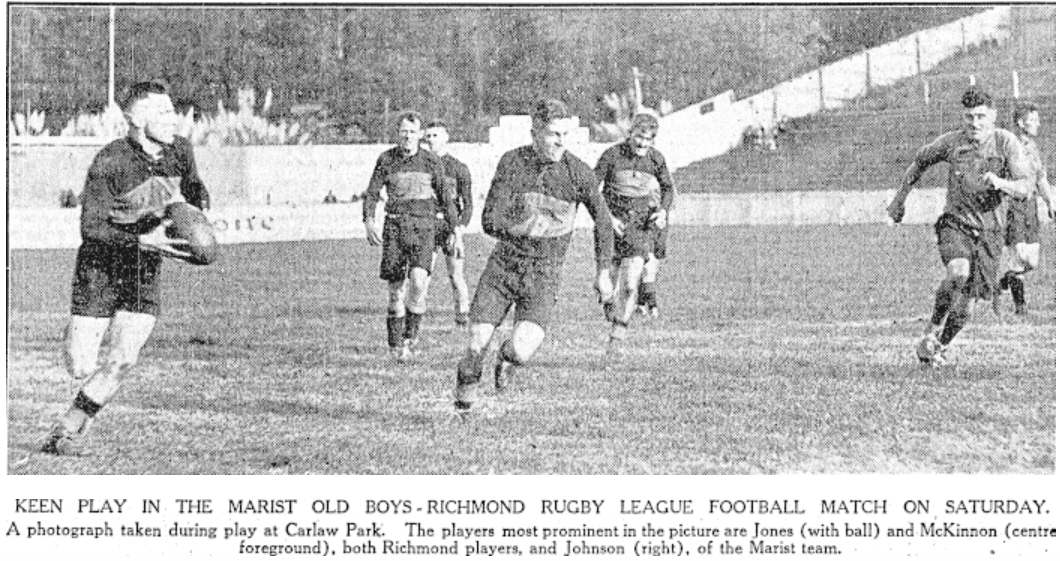

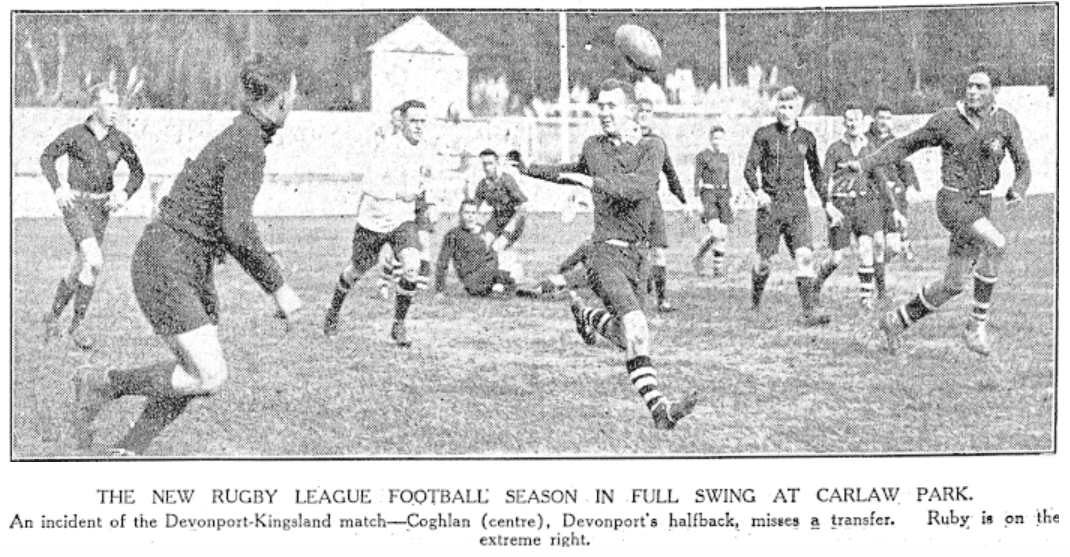

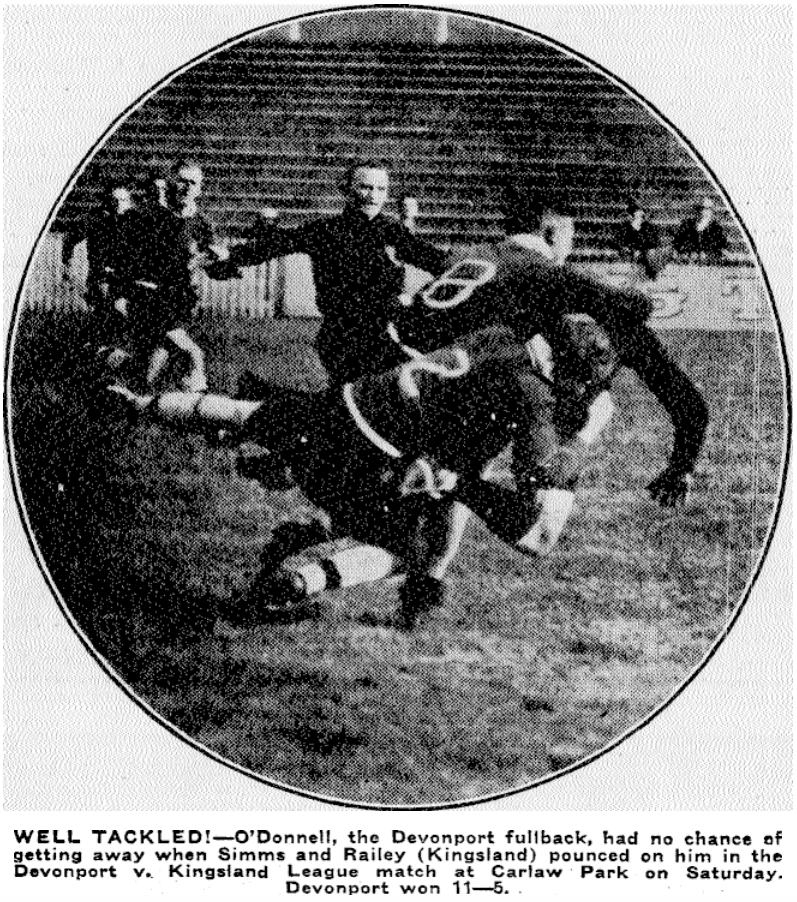

3 May	Marist	20-12	Richmond	Carlaw Park 1
3:00	Try: George Batchelor, Charles Gregory, Hec Brisbane, Norm Campbell; Con: Charles Gregory 3 Pen: Charles Gregory		Try: Ted Mincham, Tim Peckham; Con: L Taylor; Pen: L Taylor 2	Referee: Les Bull

3 May	City	27-20	Newton	Carlaw Park 2
3:00	Try: William McLaughlin 2, Puti Tipene Watene, Ben Davidson 2, Laurie Barchard, Len Barchard; Con: Puti Tipene Watene 2		Try: Stanley Francis, Charles Allen, J Beattie, Murray; Con: Cyril Brimble 3 Pen: Cyril Brimble	Referee: Arthur Rae

3 May	Devonport	11-5 (6-0)	Kingsland	Carlaw Park 1
1:30	Try: Les O’Leary 2, S Casey; Pen: Allan Seagar		Try: Revell; Con: Ralph Longville	Referee: V Simpson

3 May	Ponsonby	16-4	Ellerslie	Auckland Domain
3:00	Try: Leonard Riley, Pat Skelton, L Winters, Cyril Thompson; Con: Pat Skelton 2		Pen: Craddock Dufty 2	Attendance: 2,000; Referee: A McKubrey

==== Round 3 ====
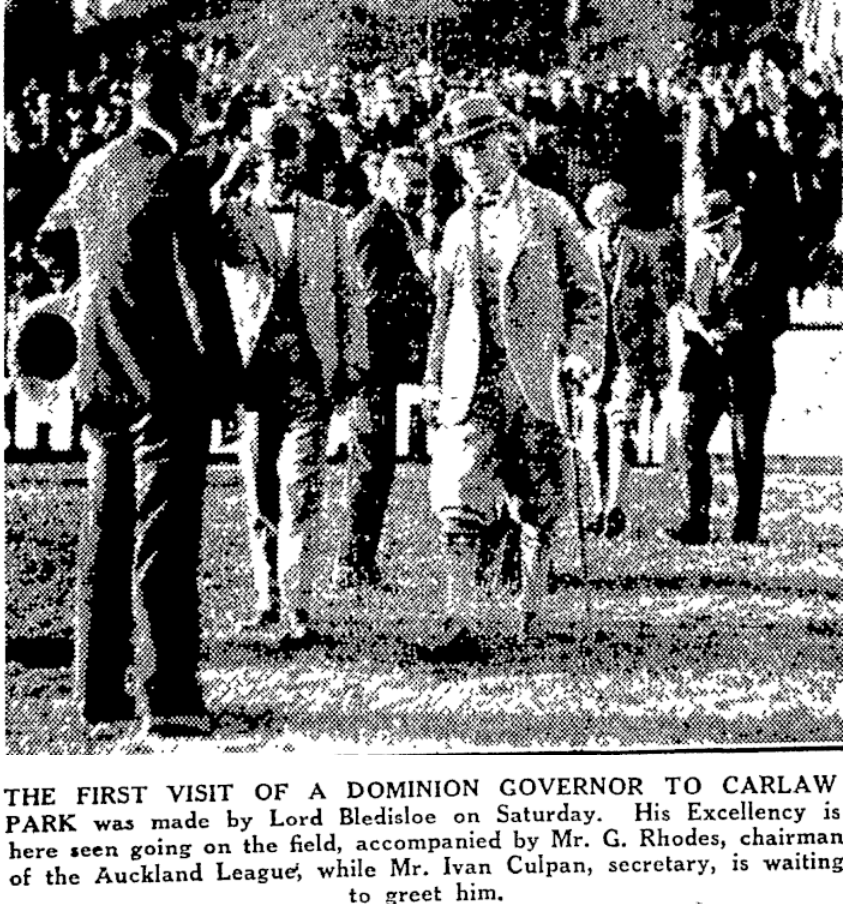
Lord Bledisloe with Auckland Rugby League chairman G. Rhodes.

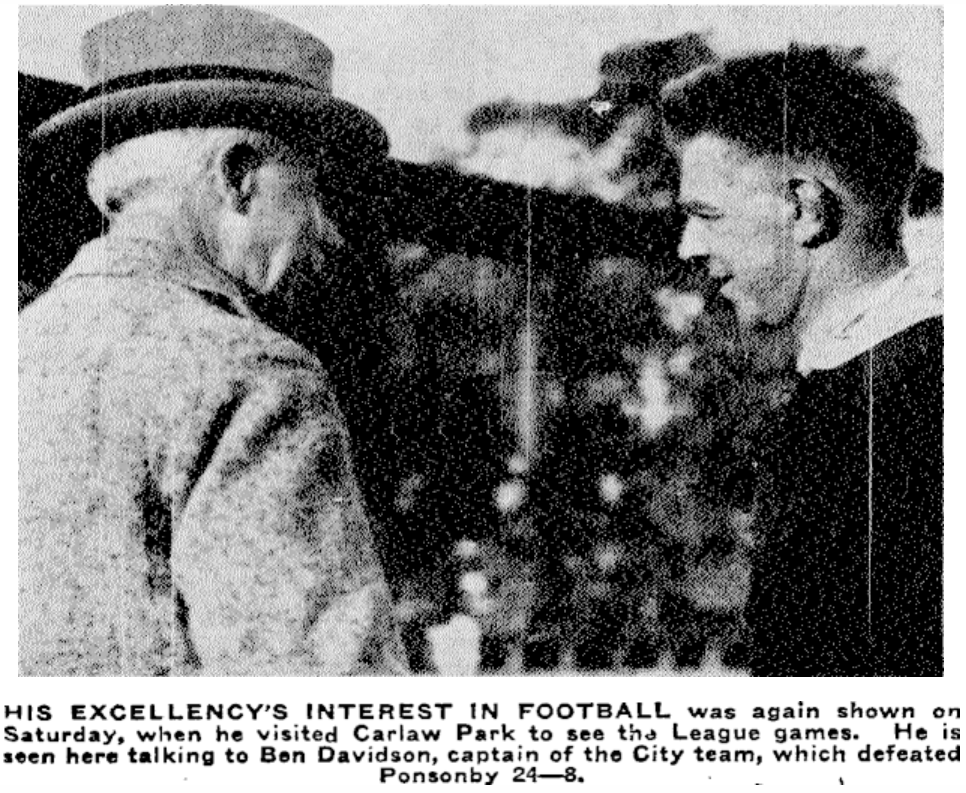

Governor General Lord Bledisloe attended the Carlaw Park matches and was photographed with Ben Davidson of City rovers before the kickoff. The City v Ponsonby match kicked off late as Ponsonby had named veteran forward Dooley Moore in their side but as he had been sent off at the end of the previous season for using insulting language and failed to appear before the management committee he was ineligible to play. George Rhodes, the chairman of the ARL management committee "smoothed things over" by saying that he could have his case considered on the upcoming Wednesday night, but he was still unable to play. Frank Delgrosso left the field early in the match for Ponsonby with an injured knee. In the second half Stanley Goodwin (concussion), Pat Skelton (ankle) and Cyril Thompson (ankle) all left the field injured and were not able to be replaced owing to the non-replacement rule which applied to the second half of matches. Goodwin was treated in hospital for his concussion injury and it was serious enough for him to remain there for a full week. When he was discharged he was advised that he should not play again for some time. Leonard Riley (displaced cartilage) was also incapacitated meaning their back line was almost devoid of players. The City team were sporting and City forward Stan Clark allowed John Angelo to get back and field the ball when he could have easily collected it and scored. The match on the number two field started in wild fashion with Devonport kicking off and Allan Seagar caught the ball and sent it to Leslie O'Leary who scored within 16 seconds which must have been a league record though without official statistics. For Newton, New Zealand international Ed St George (number 220a) debuted at hooker. He was left off the New Zealand list of internationals as it was thought when the list was later compiled that the 1932 New Zealand hooker was Neville St George, who was in fact his older brother and had debuted for New Zealand at hooker in 1925. Tragically Ed St George later moved to Sydney, Australia and in 1949 murdered his estranged wife (Daphne Sylvester Crawford) and then committed suicide.

10 May	City	24-8	Ponsonby	Carlaw Park 1
3:00	Try: Mita Watene, George Perry 3, William McLaughlin, Stan Clark; Con: Maurice Wetherill 2 Pen: Maurice Wetherill		Try: Cyril Thompson, Leonard Riley; Drop: Pat Skelton	Attendance: 10,000; Referee: Vic Simpson

10 May	Devonport	22-3	Richmond	Carlaw Park 2
3:00	Try: Les O'Leary 2, Ernest Ruby 2, Trevor O'Leary 2 Con: Ernest Ruby, Allan Seagar		Try: J Patterson	Attendance: 10,000; Referee: H Carroll

10 May	Ellerslie	5-13	Marist	Ellerslie Reserve
3:00	Try: Clifford Capner; Con: Craddock Dufty		Try: Wilf Hassan, George Batchelor, Jim Johnson; Con: Charles Gregory 2	Referee: Percy Rogers

10 May	Newton	14-8	Kingsland	Auckland Domain
3:00	Try: Cyril Brimble, A McLeod, Ed St George, Carter; Con: Cyril Brimble		Try: Robert Carter, H Carter; Con: Ralph Longville	Referee: A McKubrey

==== Round 4 ====
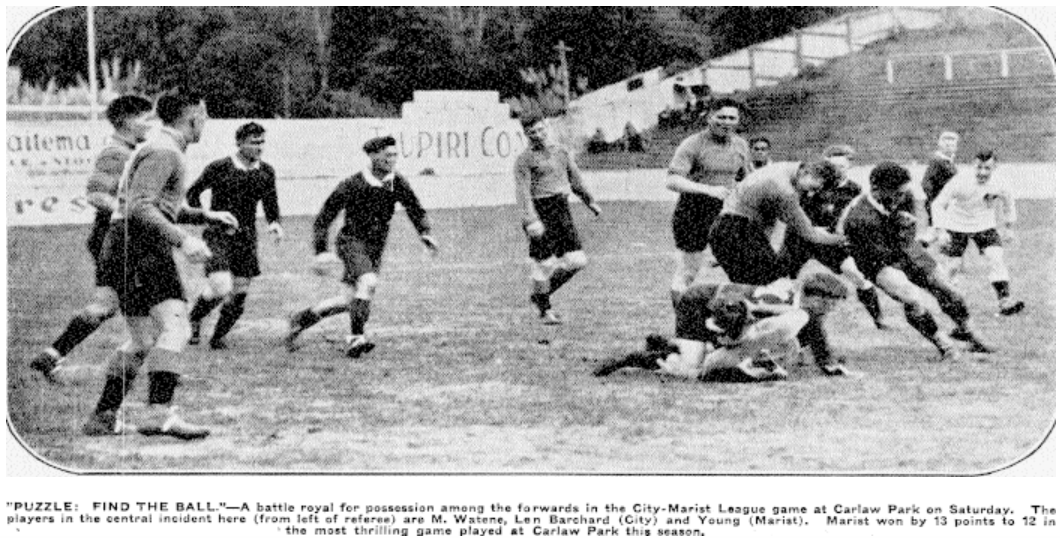

In the match between Marist and City, winger Bernard Sweeney was ordered off for Marist and Mita Watene (forward) was ordered off for City. Frank Delgrosso again left the field after injuring his knee while playing for Ponsonby who were missing Leonard Riley, Stanley Goodwin, and Pat Skelton already from the previous rounds injuries. Delgrosso was replaced at fullback by Dooley Moore who had been allowed to play following the drama of the previous round. Ponsonby wrote to the newspapers explaining that Moore had tried to attend a management committee meeting at the end of the previous season following his send off but was unable to be seen in time before the close of the season. Ellerslie had their first ever win over Devonport in their 8th match with them when they won 13-5 at the Devonport Domain. They scored three tries through Grogan, Hemingway, and F. Chapman with Craddock Dufty kicking two goals.

24 May	Marist	13-12	City	Carlaw Park 1
3:00	Try: George Batchelor 2, Bernard Sweeney; Con: Charles Gregory; Pen: Charles Gregory		Try: Puti Tipene Watene, Len Barchard; Pen: Puti Tipene Watene 2, George Perry	Referee: Percy Rogers

24 May	Ponsonby	14-10	Newton	Carlaw Park 2
3:00	Try: John Angelo, Ken Peckham, A Schofield, Bill Skelton; Con: Ken Peckham		Try: Cyril Brimble, Hill; Con: Cyril Brimble; Pen: Cyril Brimble	Referee: Wilfred Simpson

24 May	Devonport	5-13	Ellerslie	Devonport Domain
3:00	Try: Horace Dixon; Con: Les O'Leary		Try: L Grogan, J Hemingway, F Chapman; Con: Craddock Dufty 2	Referee: Vic Simpson

24 May	Richmond	10-3	Kingsland	Auckland Domain 2
3:00	Try: Ted Mincham, W Jones; Con: Ted Mincham; Pen: Ted Mincham		Try: E Lucas	Referee: Les Bull

==== Round 5 ====
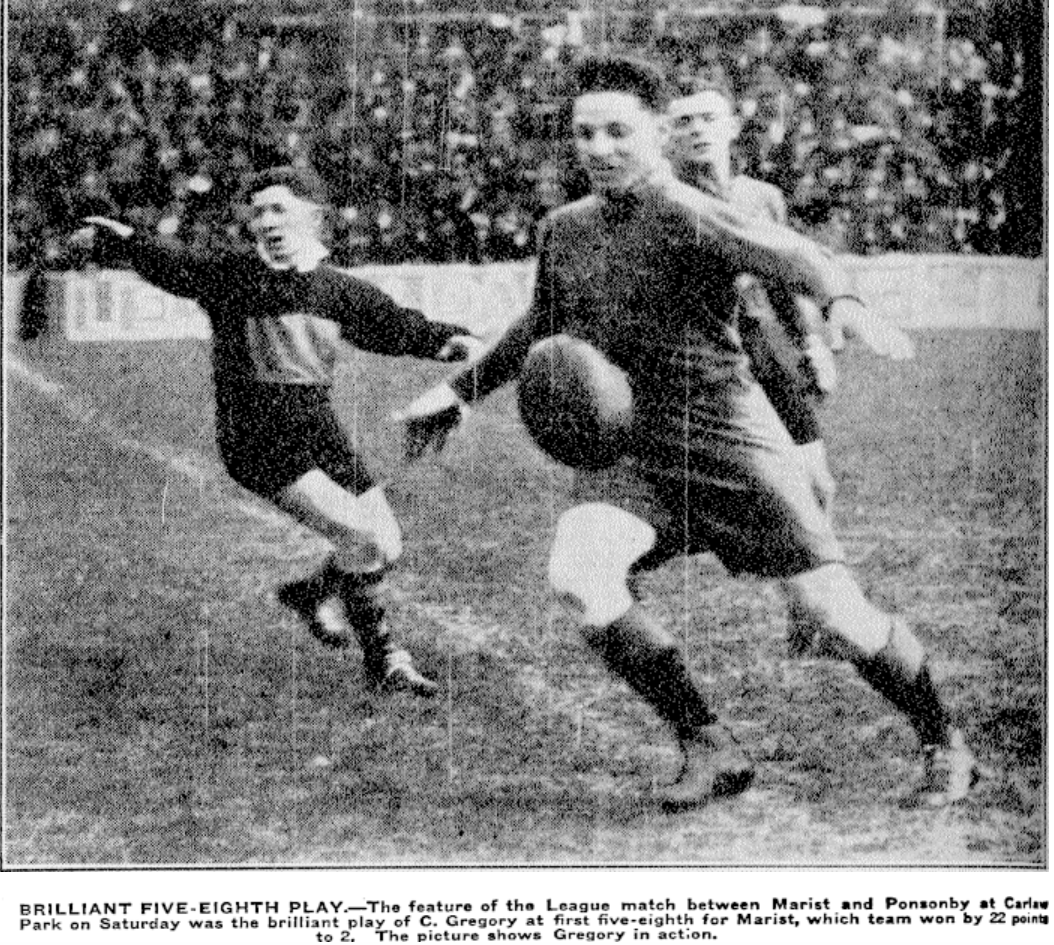
Charles Gregory (rugby) punting the ball in Marist's match v Ponsonby

In the main match on Carlaw Park the Marist winger, Horatio Drew was reported to have lost half of his trousers in a sprint to the line but carried on nonetheless to score one of his Marist sides six tries in their 22–2 win over Ponsonby. Ponsonby was missing their captain Frank Delgrosso through injury and were captained by Dooley Moore. City won 23–10 over Devonport. City had William Shortland go off injured to be replaced by William McLaughlin who scored a try, while Devonport had Coughlan and Patrick McCarthy both leave injured. McCarthy was replaced by experienced forward Stanley Rule who scored a try.

7 June	Marist	22-2	Ponsonby	Carlaw Park 1
3:00	Try: Charles Gregory 2, Jock Graham, Wilf Hassan, Horatio Drew, Hec Brisbane; Con: Jim O'Brien 2		Drop: Pat Skelton	Referee: H McKubrey

7 June	City	23-10	Devonport	Carlaw Park 2
3:00	Try: C Reynolds, Lawrence Barchard, Maurice Wetherill, William McLaughlin, Len Barchard; Con: Steve Watene 4		Try: Allan Seagar, Stanley Rule; Con: Les O’Leary 2	Referee: William Mincham

7 June	Newton	11-3	Richmond	Carlaw Park 1
1:30	Try: Hill, Clark, A McLeod; Con: Cyril Brimble		Try: Ted Mincham	Referee: Vic Simpson

7 June	Ellerslie	31-10	Kingsland	Ellerslie Reserve
3:00	Try: Coster 3, Stan Webb, J Hemingway 2, L Grogan; Con: Craddock Dufty 4, J Hemingway		Try: R Atkins, Claude List; Con: Ralph Longville 2	Referee: Stuart Billman

==== Round 6 ====
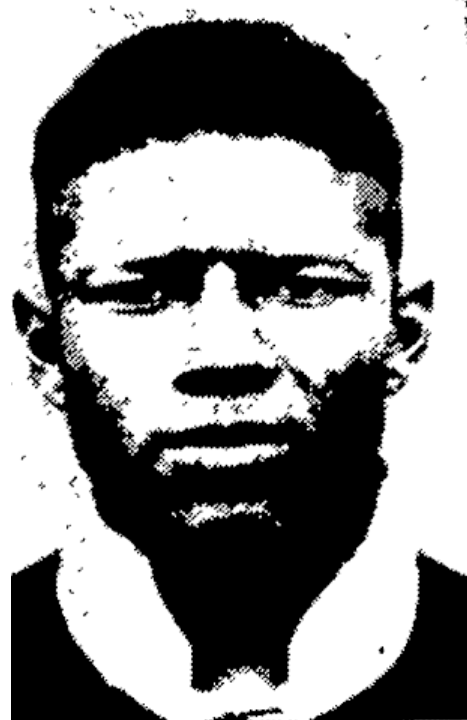
Ted Brimble

Ted Brimble made his debut for Newton Rangers after switching from the Manukau rugby club and joining his brother Cyril who was in his second season for Newton. They were of African descent with their mother a Bantu woman who married an Englishman fighting in the Boer War. At the end of the season Cyril was granted a transfer to Canterbury where he would play rugby league for the Canterbury representative side and later for Wellington. In 1947 he was killed in a fall from a motor lorry aged 48. Cyril was “found unconscious at the corner of Oxford Terrace, Lower Hutt, at 6.30pm on Saturday. He was on his way home, riding alone on the tray of a truck when he apparently fell as the vehicle was rounding a corner. The driver was unaware of the mishap. He was married with one child”. With the New Zealand team having been selected for the Australian tour many of the players either did not play or else played their final club game for some time. City was missing Puti Tipene Watene, Maurice Wetherill, and Stan Clark, while Mita Watene also didn't play.Allan Seagar was absent from the Devonport side, though Alf Scott made his first appearance for them for the season. In the match between Richmond and Ellerslie at Grey Lynn Park, J Potter, the Richmond forward got a bad cut over his eye and was forced off to be replaced by Blundell, while for Ellerslie Hobbs hurdled an opponent and landed on the back of his head with his scalp cut open. He was replaced by Calder.

21 June	Marist	31-10	Newton	Carlaw Park 1
3:00	Try: Charles Gregory, Wilf Hassan, Phil Brady, George Batchelor 2, Jim O'Brien, Norm Campbell; Con: Charles Gregory 3, George Batchelor; Pen: Charles Gregory		Try: A McLeod, Ed St George; Con: Cyril Brimble; Pen: Hill	Referee: Bert Emirali

21 June	City	17-13	Kingsland	Carlaw Park 1
1:30	Try: William McLaughlin, Henry Paton, Joe Hadley, George Perry, Ben Davidson; Con: Laurie Barchard		Try: Robert Carter 2, G Simms; Con: Frank Herring 2	Referee: Frank Thompson

21 June	Ponsonby	8-6	Devonport	Carlaw Park 2
3:00	Try: A Schofield, L Winters; Con: Frank Delgrosso		Try: S Casey, Horace Dixon	Referee: Vic Simpson

21 June	Richmond	8-0	Ellerslie	Grey Lynn Park
3:00	Try: J Patterson 2 Con: Ted Mincham			Referee: Les Bull

==== Round 7 ====
Dick Smith

The match between Ponsonby and Kingsland was played at the Mangere Domain. Devonport junior Dick Smith once again turned out for them having done so once the previous season. He was spoken of highly and scored a try and kicked a conversion. He didn't become a regular in the first grade side until 1931 and was so impressive he represented New Zealand in 1932.

28 June	Devonport	24-12	Marist	Carlaw Park 1
3:00	Try: Dick Smith, Les O’Leary, Ernest Ruby, Alf Scott; Con: Les O’Leary 4 Pen: Les O’Leary, Dick Smith		Try: Jock Graham, George Batchelor; Con: Jim O'Brien 2 Pen: Jim O'Brien	Referee: Les Bull

28 June	Newton	22-18	Ellerslie	Carlaw Park 2
3:00	Try: Butler, Charles Allan 2, Cyril Brimble 2, Ted Brimble; Con: Hill, Claude Dempsey		Try: Calder, Coster, Drew 2 Con: J Hemingway 2, Stan Webb	Referee: E McCall

28 June	Ponsonby	13-12	Kingsland	Mangere Domain
3:00	Try: Schofield, John Angelo, Heck Lunn; Con: Frank Delgrosso 2		Try: G Simms, McLaughlin; Con: Ralph Longville, Frank Herring; Pen: Frank Herring	Referee: Wilfred Simpson

28 June	City	11-7	Richmond	Auckland Domain 2
3:00	Try: William McLaughlin 2, George Perry; Con: Laurie Barchard		Try: Arthur Lennie; Con: W Jones; Pen: George Davis	Referee: Vic Simpson

==== Round 8 ====
After poor weather the grounds were in a heavy condition and a relatively poor crowd attended Carlaw Park. The Marist v Kingsland match finished with an unusual scoreline of 0-0. Although the score was perhaps somewhat misleading as Marist Old Boys played two men short for most of the game with George Batchelor and Norm Campbell going off injured in the first half. It was one of the only times a 0-0 scoreline had happened in the first grade since the first round of matches in 1910 when North Shore drew 0–0 with Newton. All of the Auckland based New Zealand players were on tour so some sides were depleted of their best players for the next few rounds. Ponsonby had a last minute win over Richmond who had taken a 9-5 lead before Doug McLeay scored for Ponsonby and Frank Delgrosso converted it to take the victory. A. Fagan of Richmond suffered a "severe cut" over his left eye but was able to go home from the ground. Alfred Saxon, the 27 year old fullback for Devonport had his jaw broken in a collision and was taken by ambulance to Auckland Hospital where he spent the night, while near the end of the first half Horace Dixon was carried from the field with an injured leg. Stanley Rule, the veteran Devonport forward was on the sidelines carrying a slight injury and was not stripped in playing uniform so he went on to the field in his ordinary clothing and approached the referee Vic Simpson. He was able to get changed in the interval and play the second half in Dixon's place. The two St George brothers (Neville and Ed) matched up at hooker for the first time in senior grade.

5 July	Devonport	5-0	Newton	Carlaw Park 1
3:00	Try: Leslie O’Leary; Pen: Leslie O’Leary			Referee: Vic Simpson

5 July	City	6-2	Ellerslie	Carlaw Park 1
1:30	Try: Joe Hadley 2		Pen: J Hemingway	Referee: H Carroll

5 July	Ponsonby	10-9	Richmond	Carlaw Park 2
3:00	Try: Leonard Riley, Doug McLeay; Con: Frank Delgrosso 2		Try: Joseph Ragg, Ted Mincham, J Patterson	Referee: Percy Rogers

5 July	Marist	0-0	Kingsland	Carlaw Park 2
1:30				Referee: T Hill

==== Round 9 ====
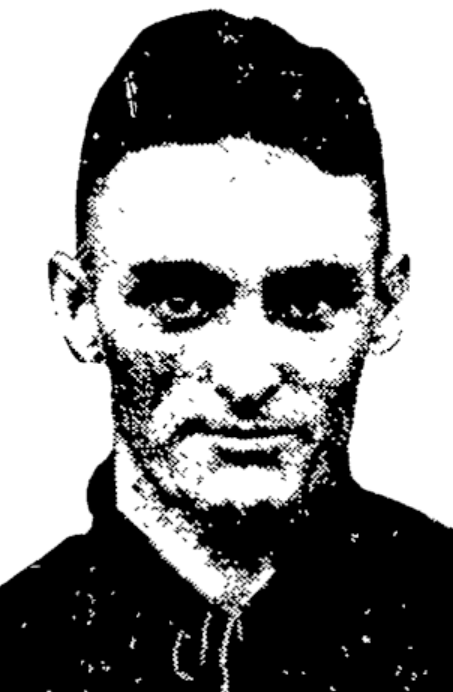
Ted Mincham

In Richmond's 11-10 win over Marist, Richmond back George Davis was stretchered off the field with a serious head injury but was able to go home from the ground. He was said to have been bleeding profusely and unconscious but recovered later. William (Bill) Seagar of Devonport cracked a collarbone and missed several matches. Ted Mincham (Richmond) scored two tries and kicked a match winning penalty. The win was somewhat remarkable as they were awarded a penalty on full time and with time up Mincham kicked with the ball striking an upright and then landing on the crossbar before rolling over. The Richmond supporters then rushed the field. John Preston for Kingsland broke his collarbone in a fall in their match against Devonport at the Devonport Domain.

12 July	Richmond	11-10	Marist	Carlaw Park 1
3:00	Try: Ted Mincham 2, W Ritchie; Pen: Ted Mincham		Try: Phil Brady, Jock Graham; Con: Jim O'Brien 2	Referee: A McKubrey

12 July	City	21-8	Newton	Carlaw Park 1
3:00	Try: George Perry 3, William Shortland, C Reynolds; Con: Henry Paton 3		Try: Ted Brimble, Ray Middleton; Con: Hill	Referee: Bertie Victor Emirali

12 July	Devonport	13-6	Kingsland	Devonport Domain
3:00	Try: Ernest Ruby, Alf Scott, R O’Donnell; Con: Alf Scott; Pen: Leslie O'Leary		Try: Claude List, Robert Carter	Referee: Les Bull

12 July	Ponsonby	10-5	Ellerslie	Auckland Domain 1
3:00	Try: A Schofield, Leonard Riley; Con: Frank Delgrosso; Pen: Frank Delgrosso		Try: Drew; Pen: J Hemingway	Referee: Percy Rogers

==== Round 10 ====
For Marist, Phil Brady was sent off for punching an Ellerslie player early in the second half. Bert Laing after an absence of 3 years turned out for Devonport. Lionel Thomas a Richmond forward who debuted the previous week as an injury replacement had his ribs broken and received head injuries during their 14-13 win over Devonport. The 20 year old was taken to Auckland Hospital by ambulance but was not in a serious condition.

19 July	Ponsonby	29-12	City	Carlaw Park 1
3:00	Try: Heck Lunn, Pat Skelton, A Schofield, Bill Skelton, Leonard Riley; Con: Frank Delgrosso 5 Pen: Frank Delgrosso 2		Try: Bill Hamilton, Norman Pascoe; Pen: Henry Paton 3	Referee: E McCall

19 July	Marist	25-8	Ellerslie	Auckland Domain
3:00	Try: George Batchelor 2, George Drew 4, Bert Schultz; Con: Bert Schultz; Pen: Alan Clarke		Try: Quirke 2 Pen: Leslie Oliff	Referee: Stuart Billman

19 July	Kingsland	13-5	Newton	Auckland Domain 6
3:00	Try: G Simms, Claude List 2 Con: Frank Herring; Pen: Frank Herring		Try: Ray Middleton; Con: Ted Brimble	Referee: Wilfred Simpson

19 July	Richmond	14-13	Devonport	Carlaw Park 2
3:00	Try: Ted Mincham, Edwards; Con: Ted Mincham; Pen: Ted Mincham 3		Try: Leslie O'Leary, R O'Donnell, Neville St George; Con: Leslie O'Leary 2	Referee: C Moore

==== Round 11 ====
City and Marist played out the highest scoring draw in the competitions history to that point. Joe Hadley scored for City on full time and Henry Paton skimmed the bar with his conversion to tie the game "amid great excitement". Mollet who had recently begun playing for the Newton club was said to have been involved with the Manukau rugby club previously but it transpired that he had in fact been involved with the Manukau rugby league club before it transferred enmasse to rugby union during the 1924 after a dispute with the Auckland Rugby League.

2 August	City	28-28	Marist	Carlaw Park 1
3:00	Try: Bill Hadley, William Perry, George Perry, Joe Hadley 2, C Reynolds, James Everson, William McLaughlin; Con: Henry Paton 2		Try: George Batchelor 3, Jim Johnson, Phil Brady 3, Alan Clarke; Con: Jim O'Brien 2	Referee: Les Bull

2 August	Ponsonby	18-7	Newton	Carlaw Park 2
3:00	Try: Heck Lunn, Leonard Riley 2, A Schofield; Con: Frank Delgrosso 3		Try: Ed St George; Con: Claude Dempsey; Pen: Claude Dempsey	Referee: A McKubrey

2 August	Ellerslie	8-12	Devonport	Ellerslie Racecourse
3:00	Try: Kennedy, Stan Webb; Con: Wally Somers		Try: Leslie O'Leary, C Rhodes; Con: Leslie O'Leary; Pen: Leslie O'Leary	Referee: E McCall

2 August	Kingsland	13-8	Richmond	Carlaw Park 1
1:30	Try: Robert Carter 2, Herb Carter; Con: Ralph Longville; Pen: Ralph Longville		Try: George Mills, Tim Peckham; Con: Ted Mincham	Referee: Vic Simpson

==== Round 12 ====
The Round 12 matches due to be played on 9 August were all postponed after rain fell on the Saturday. This added to the rain which had fallen throughout the week leading up to the Saturday. Lindsay Simons returned to Auckland after moving to Wellington for work the previous year. He played at fullback for his old Devonport club. City protested on the grounds that he was not registered with them but the New Zealand Rugby League dismissed the protest saying that he was still registered with Devonport as there was no rugby league body in Wellington registered with New Zealand Rugby League. It was reported during the following week that Doug McLeay the Ponsonby forward had had to undergo an operation in hospital as the result of an internal injury received in football which must have occurred in round 10 (the last time he played). He had reportedly been in a critical condition for a time but his condition had improved. Newton beat Richmond 11-3 which was the exact same score they beat them by 7 rounds earlier.

16 August	Ponsonby	19-10	Marist	Carlaw Park 1
3:15	Try: A McIntyre, Leonard Riley 3, Pat Skelton; Con: Frank Delgrosso; Pen: Pat Skelton		Try: George Batchelor 2 Con: Jim O'Brien 2	Referee: Percy Rogers

16 August	Ellerslie	18-16	Kingsland	Carlaw Park 2
3:15	Try: Wally Somers, A Hickey 2, Quirke; Con: Leslie Oliff 2 Pen: Wally Somers		Try: Robert Carter 2, Dix, Claude List; Con: Ralph Longville; Pen: Ralph Longville	Referee: T Hill

16 August	Devonport	11-0	City	Carlaw Park 1
1:45	Try: Dick Smith, Trevor O’Leary, J Harding; Con: Leslie O’Leary			Referee: E McCall

16 August	Newton	11-3	Richmond	Auckland Domain 3
3:00	Try: Hill, Cyril Brimble, A McLeod; Con: Cyril Brimble		Try: Stan Prentice	Referee: Les Bull

==== Round 13 ====
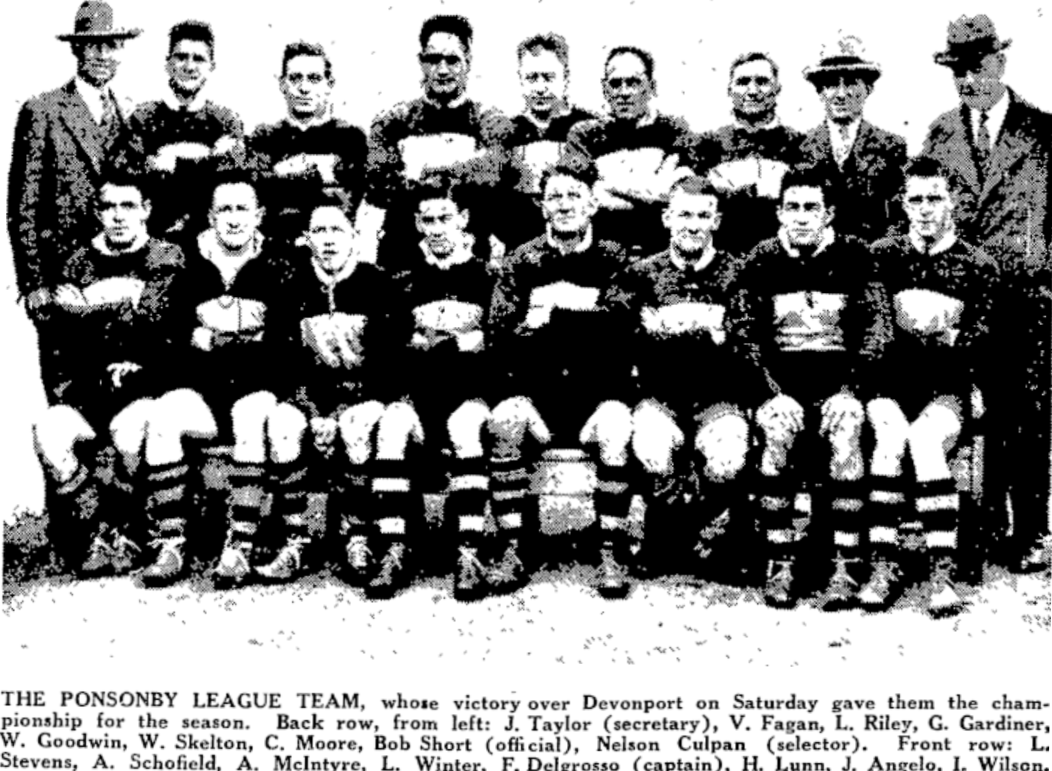
The Ponsonby United side which won the 1930 championship

Ponsonby convincingly won the championship beating Devonport 28-3 after feeding off Devonports mistakes throughout the game. After returning from Australia, Craddock Dufty kicked a penalty on full time to help his Ellerslie side beat Richmond by a point. It was the first time Ellerslie had beaten Richmond after eight previous defeats stretching from 1924 to the present season. In Kingslands 14-13 upset win over City, City had to field two sixth grade players, McGregor and Zannovitch, while Kingsland fielded a fourth grade player in Tunnicliffe. They were said to have done well but "were shrewd enough to keep out of all the trouble that was going at the end". Play had to be stopped for several minutes as Kingland took the lead late on and City strived to win the match with their supporters crowding on to the field at the Auckland Domain with the officials struggling to get them off. It was the last ever 1st grade championship match for the Kingsland Athletic club which had begun as Maritime in Maritime. In 1922 they were renamed as Athletic, before becoming Grafton Athletic in 1926, and then merged with Kingsland Rovers in 1929. In 1930 the Auckland Rugby League essentially forced them into a merger with Marist as they reduced the number of first grade teams to improve the standard. Ironically it was the first time they had beaten City for 8 years. In the drawn game between Marist and Newton, Jock Graham forward for Marist had to leave the field with a badly broken thumb.

30 August	Ponsonby	28-3	Devonport	Carlaw Park 1
3:15	Try: A Schofield 2, L Winters, Stanley Goodwin, Victor Fagan, John Angelo; Con: Frank Delgrosso 3, Dooley Moore, Leonard Riley		Try: Dick Smith	Referee: William Mincham

30 August	Kingsland	14-13	City	Auckland Domain
3:00	Try: Claude List 2, G Simms, E Lucas; Con: Frank Herring		Try: Laurie Barchard 2, Henry Paton; Con: Laurie Barchard 2	Referee: A.E. Smith

30 August	Marist	16-16	Newton	Carlaw Park 2
3:15	Try: Owen Cronin 2, Fraser Webberley, Pat Young; Con: Charles Gregory 2		Try: Cyril Brimble 2, Stanley Francis, Charles Allan; Con: Claude Dempsey, Hill	Referee: A McKubrey

30 August	Ellerslie	17-16	Richmond	Ellerslie Reserve
3:00	Try: Kennedy, Horatio Drew, Aiden Hickey; Con: Craddock Dufty 2 Pen: Craddock Dufty 2		Try: Ted Mincham, J Potter, Joseph Ragg, Lionel Thomas; Con: Ted Mincham 2	Referee: Stuart Billman

=== Roope Rooster knockout competition ===
==== Round 1 ====
Craddock Dufty, who had returned from the recent New Zealand tour to Australia refused to play in the fixture against the Auckland players citing an injured elbow. He did not produce a doctors certificate and as a result Auckland Rugby League suspended him and he was unable to play for Ellerslie in their first round match. Interestingly his place at fullback was taken by 30 year old Charles Hand. He had played for North Shore from 1921-25, before transferring to Newton and playing for them until the end of the 1926 season when he retired. He was said to have struggled as he had not taken the field for over four years. Jim O'Brien was sent off after a "verbal altercation" with referee Vic Simpson. This was to be his last official competition match of his career, though he did play in the McManus benefit match weeks later at Otahuhu. M Herewini the former Newton fullback turned out for Ponsonby and kicked a conversion in their 30-12 win over Ellerslie. Marist did not have the services of Hec Brisbane, still injured from the New Zealand tour, Jock Graham who was also injured, or Phil Brady who was still in hospital with injuries he received in the Auckland v New Zealand game. As a result they had to pull Alan Clarke out of the loose forwards and play him at centre where he struggled. They were defeated by Richmond 6-3 in a tight battle with W Ritchie and Ted Mincham scoring for the winners. Bill Seagar, who debuted for Devonport in July broke his arm minutes before fulltime. It was only his second game as he had broken his collarbone in his debut against Kingsland in the earlier match.

6 September	Richmond	6-3	Marist	Carlaw Park 1
3:15	Try: Ted Mincham, W Ritchie		Try: Pat Young	Referee: Vic Simpson

6 September	Ponsonby	30-12	Ellerslie	Carlaw Park 2
3:15	Try: Leonard Riley 2, Pat Skelton 2, L Winters 2, A Schofield, Victor Fagan; Con: Frank Delgrosso, George Gardiner, M Herewini		Try: Quirk, Wally Somers; Con: Leslie Oliff; Pen: Leslie Oliff 2	Referee: A McKubrey

6 September	City	31-13	Kingsland	Carlaw Park 2
1:45	Try: Laurie Barchard 4, George Perry 2, Leek; Con: Laurie Barchard 3, Maurice Wetherill 2		Try: Wright, Frank Herring, R Atkins; Con: Frank Herring; Pen: Frank Herring	Referee: Bert Emirali

6 September	Devonport	15-2	Newton	Carlaw Park 2
1:45	Try: Allan Seagar, S Casey, Stanley Rule; Con: Leslie O'Leary 2 Pen: Leslie O'Leary		Pen: Claude Dempsey	Referee: Les Bull

==== Semi finals ====
13 September	Ponsonby	10-5	Devonport	Carlaw Park 1
3:15	Try: Pat Skelton, Frank Delgrosso; Con: George Gardiner; Pen: George Gardiner		Try: Leslie O’Leary; Pen: Leslie O’Leary	Referee: Percy Rogers

13 September	Richmond	13-0	City	Carlaw Park 2
3:15	Try: Ted Mincham, Stallworthy 2 Con: W Jones, George Davis			Referee: H McKubrey

==== Final ====
20 September	Ponsonby	15-7	Richmond	Carlaw Park 1
3:15	Try: George Gardiner, Bill Skelton, A Schofield; Con: Frank Delgrosso 2 Pen: Frank Delgrosso		Try: Lionel Thomas; Con: Ted Mincham; Pen: Ted Mincham	Referee: Les Bull

=== Stormont Shield ===
==== Play in Match ====
City and Devonport were tied for second place in the Senior A competition and as Ponsonby won both the Senior A championship and the Roope Rooster it left City and Devonport to play off for the right to join them in the Stormont Shield match. Devonport defeated City by 1 point to earn the right to play Ponsonby. Twenty year old, Puti Tipene Watene had to leave the field for City with concussion and was taken to hospital but his condition was not serious. This forced a merry-go-round at fullback with several players tried there unsuccessfully. John Frederick Wilson, a rugby player from Grammar Old Boys debuted for Devonport and scored a try, while Hugh Simpson the former Northcote player also debuted for them in the forwards while George Munce debuted for City on the wing after transferring from the Parnell side.

27 September	Devonport	18-17	City	Carlaw Park 1
3:15	Try: Stanley Rule, John Wilson, S Casey, Trevor O’Leary; Con: Alf Scott 3		Try: Ben Davidson 2, Laurie Barchard 2, Stan Clark; Con: Ben Davidson	Referee: Bertie Victor Emirali

==== Stormont Shield final ====
In the final Ponsonby had Dooley Moore ordered off but he refused to leave. The referee then left the field until Moore was persuaded to leave and the game could progress. He was later suspended by the league. It eventually turned out that the Auckland and New Zealand representative Frank Delgrosso who was captain at the time had failed to persuade him to leave the field and had also verbally abused the referee and thrown mud at him. Delgrosso was suspended by the league for three years but on appeal and with an apology and expression of regret at a March 1931 meeting his suspension was reduced. The hearing which saw his suspension did not take place until after the Provincial Club Championship on October 4 which meant Frank Delgrosso could play and he kicked four conversions in their 32-29 win.

4 October	Devonport	17-5	Ponsonby	Carlaw Park 1
3:15	Try: Allan Seagar 2, Adams; Con: Allan Seagar, J Harding, Trevor O’Leary; Pen: Allan Seagar		Try: Heck Lunn; Con: Frank Delgrosso	Referee: Vic Simpson

=== Provincial club championship ===
The match was organised at the request of the Waikato body and was between the champions of the Auckland and South Auckland (Waikato) competitions. Ponsonby had a severely weakened backline with Leonard Riley, Ivan Wilson, Pat Skelton, and A Schofield all missing but their replacements did well. New Zealand representative George Tittleton of Ngaruawahia fractured his collarbone after being thrown heavily near the end of the match. He finished the game but was taken to Auckland Hospital straight after the match where he had scored 3 tries and kicked 2 goals. Edwin Abbott also a New Zealand representative scored a try for them as well. His uncle was Harold Abbott who played for the All Blacks in 1905, while his nephew was Kiwi 445 Bill Deacon. L Stevens, the Ponsonby hooker received a head injury which required stitches.

11 October	Ponsonby	32-29	Ngaruawahia	Carlaw Park 1
3:00	Try: Roy Bright, Stanley Goodwin, L Winters, E Friend 2, Heck Lunn, George Gardiner, Unknown x 1 Con: Frank Delgrosso 4		Try: Edwin Abbott, Williams, George Tittleton 3, Te Huia Hawira Mason, Jim Laird; Con: George Tittleton, G Hall 2 Pen: George Tittleton	Referee: Arthur Rae

=== Top try scorers and point scorers ===
Top try and point scorers for A Grade and Roope Rooster matches. Leslie O'Leary of Devonport United top scored with 72 points followed by Frank Delgrosso with 59, and Ted Mincham with 52. George Batchelor of Marist Old Boys was the top try scorer with 14, followed by Leonard Riley and George Perry with 12 each. The games played are unofficial with some teams not submitting lineups to the newspapers on Friday. Marist did not enter a lineup at all during the season and so the number of games played is likely a little higher in their players cases.

Top try scorers
Rk	Player	Team	Gms	Tries
1	George Batchelor	Marist	12	14
2=	Leonard Riley	Ponsonby	15	12
2=	George Perry	City	16	12
4=	Laurie Barchard	City	16	11
4=	A Schofield	Ponsonby	17	11
6=	Ted Mincham	Richmond	16	10
6=	Leslie O'Leary	Devonport	15	10
8	William McLaughlin	City	13	9
9	Robert Carter	Kingsland	12	8
10=	Cyril Brimble	Newton	14	7
10=	Claude List	Kingsland	14	7
10=	Phil Brady	Marist	12	7
10=	L Winter	Ponsonby	17	7

Top point scorers
Rk	Player	Team	G	T	C	P	DG	Pts
1	Leslie O'Leary	Devonport	15	10	15	6	0	72
2	Frank Delgrosso	Ponsonby	17	1	28	5	0	69
3	Ted Mincham	Richmond	16	10	6	5	0	52
4=	Laurie Barchard	City	16	11	7	0	0	47
5=	George Batchelor	Marist	12	14	1	0	0	44
5=	Charles Gregory	Marist	8	4	12	4	0	44
7	Cyril Brimble	Newton	14	7	9	2	0	43
8=	George Perry	City	16	12	0	1	0	38
8=	Leonard Riley	Ponsonby	15	12	1	0	0	38
10	A Schofield	Ponsonby	17	11	0	0	0	33

== Senior B grade competition ==
=== Senior B grade standings ===
A Māngere United and Mt Albert result is missing as it was not reported in any of the newspapers of the time.

Team	Pld	W	D	L	F	A	Pts
Otahuhu United	13	11	1	1	183	81	23
Point Chevalier	13	10	1	2	108	62	21
Mount Albert United	11	4	1	6	82	101	9
Māngere United	10	4	0	6	90	83	8
Northcote and Birkenhead Ramblers	12	4	0	8	67	92	8
Parnell	12	4	0	8	68	138	8
Richmond Rovers B	11	2	1	8	61	102	5

=== Senior B grade fixtures ===
Mt Albert entered a senior team for the first time in their club history which had begun in 1928. Their meeting with Otahuhu in Round 3 was the first time the two senior sides had faced each other with Otahuhu winning 9 to 8. The two clubs have gone on to be the most dominant clubs in senior rugby league in Auckland since with Mt Albert winning the championship 16 times and Otahuhu 13 times.

The Round 8 game between Māngere and Richmond B was not played because a charity match between Ponsonby and Kingsland was being played on its ground. Parnell were referred to as the “magpies” on account of their black and white uniforms by the Auckland Star after their Round 9 match. The Round 9 match report in the Auckland Star incorrectly reported the score 15–6 in favour of Northcote, however they corrected it in their following week reports of the Senior B matches as being a 15–6 win to Mangere. The round 13 matches were cancelled due to steady rain falling on the Saturday adding to significant rain that had fallen during the week, aside from the game at Māngere. The Northcote v Otahuhu match was postponed as Northcote had played their traditional fixture v Huntly on Northcote's home ground at Stafford Park.

Otahuhu beat Point Chevalier in the final by 3 points to 0 to win the Senior B championship.

1930 Senior B results
	Date		Score		Score	Venue	Attendance
Round 1	26 April	Point Chevalier	23	Parnell	8	Carlaw Park # 2, 1:30pm	
–	26 April	Richmond B	6	Northcote	3	Victoria Park, 3pm	
–	26 April	Mangere	5	Otahuhu	11	Mangere, 3pm	
Round 2	3 May	Otahuhu	11	Parnell	7	Auckland Domain # 1, 3pm	
–	3 May	Point Chevalier	5	Mt Albert	3	Point Chevalier, 3pm	
–	3 May	Mangere	11	Richmond B	3	Mangere, 3pm	
Round 3	10 May	Northcote	8	Mangere	6	Northcote	
–	10 May	Mount Albert	8	Otahuhu	9	Mount Albert, 3pm	
–	10 May	Richmond B	18	Parnell	7	Grey Lynn, 3pm	
Round 4	17 May	Otahuhu	8	Point Chevalier	8	Sturgess Park, Otahuhu, 3pm	
–	17 May	Richmond B	9	Mount Albert	11	Grey Lynn, 3pm	
–	17 May	Parnell	9	Northcote	0	Carlaw Park # 2, 3pm	
Round 5	24 May	Mount Albert	8	Northcote	5	Victoria Park, 3pm	
–	24 May	Mangere	11	Parnell	15	Mangere, 3pm	
–	24 May	Point Chevalier	8	Richmond B	5	Point Chevalier, 3pm	
Round 6	31 May	Otahuhu	29	Richmond B	0	Sturges Park, Otahuhu, 3pm	
–	31 May	Mangere	12	Mount Albert	8	Carlaw Park # 2, 3pm	
–	31 May	Northcote	6	Point Chevalier	2	Stafford Park, Northcote, 3pm	
Round 6	7 June	Otahuhu	10	Northcote	8	Victoria Park, 3pm	
–	7 June	Point Chevalier	9	Mangere	3	Point Chevalier, 3pm	
–	7 June	Mount Albert	5	Parnell	7	Mount Albert, 3pm	
Round 7	21 June	Northcote	15	Richmond B	7	Stafford Park, Northcote, 3pm	
–	21 June	Otahuhu	17	Mangere	10	Sturges Park, Otahuhu, 3pm	
–	21 June	Point Chevalier	5	Parnell	4	Point Chevalier, 3pm	
Round 8	28 June	Otahuhu	28	Parnell	2	Mangere Domain, 2pm	
–	28 June	Mount Albert	0	Point Chevalier	18	Mount Albert, 3pm	
–	28 June	Mangere	PPD	Richmond B	PPD		
Round 9	5 July	Parnell	2	Richmond B	0	Auckland Domain # 2, 3pm	
–	5 July	Mangere	15	Northcote	6	Mangere, 3pm	
–	5 July	Otahuhu	25	Mount Albert	8	Sturges Park, Otahuhu, 3pm	
Round 10	12 July	Mount Albert	3	Richmond	3	Mount Albert, 3pm	
–	12 July	Point Chevalier	13	Otahuhu	12	Point Chevalier, 3pm	1,000
–	12 July	Northcote	6	Parnell	2	Stafford Park, Northcote, 3pm	
Round 11	19 July	Richmond B	3	Point Chevalier	5	Grey Lynn Park, 3pm	
–	19 July	Mount Albert	9	Northcote	3	Mount Albert, 3pm	
–	19 July	Mangere	12	Parnell	0	Carlaw Park # 1, 1:30pm	
Round 12	2 Aug	Richmond B	7	Otahuhu	8	Grey Lynn Park # 2, 3pm	
–	2 Aug	Point Chevalier	6	Northcote	2	Point Chevalier, 3pm	
–	2 Aug	Mount Albert	?	Mangere	?	Mount Albert, 3pm	
Round 13	14 Aug	Mount Albert	19	Parnell	5	Carlaw Park # 1, 1:45pm	
–	23 Aug	Otahuhu	12	Northcote	5	Auckland Domain # 1, 3pm	
–	9 Aug	Mangere	5	Point Chevalier	6	Mangere Domain, 3pm	
Final	30 Aug	Otahuhu	3	Point Chevalier	0	Carlaw Park # 1, 1:45	

=== Stallard Cup knockout competition ===
Devonport entered a Senior B team in the Stallard Cup which had not played in the Senior B grade during the season. This team could loosely be considered the second ever ‘reserve’ grade team fielded following the Richmond clubs entry of Senior B teams in that grade for the 1929 and 1930 seasons.

1930 Stallard Cup results
	Date		Score		Score	Venue
Round 1	6 Sep	Mount Albert	5	Northcote	3	Auckland Domain # 2, 3pm
–	6 Sep	Parnell	12	Richmond B	7	Auckland Domain # 6, 3pm
–	6 Sep	Otahuhu	6	Mangere	0	Papatoetoe, 3pm
–	6 Sep	Devonport B	10	Point Chevalier	16	Devonport Domain, 3pm
Semi final	13 Sep	Point Chevalier	3	Otahuhu	0	Carlaw Park # 1, 1:45pm
Semi final	13 Sep	Richmond B	10	Mount Albert	4	Carlaw Park # 2, 1:45pm
Final	27 Sep	Richmond B	21	Point Chevalier	11	Carlaw Park # 2, 3:15pm

== Other club matches and lower grades ==
=== Lower grade competitions ===
The Sixth grade had in previous years been split into A and B grades however in 1930 the Sixth Grade B competition was reclassified as the Seventh Grade.

==== Second grade ====
Richmond won the championship. The team had been together for 6 seasons and won every single championship as they progressed through the grades. Ponsonby United won the knock out competition on September 13 when they beat Devonport by default. There were several games without results reported however the newspapers published the final standings so they are accurate.

Team	Pld	W	D	L	F	A	Pts
Richmond Rovers	11	11	0	0	136	12	22
Ponsonby United	11	9	0	2	131	49	18
Marist Old Boys	11	5	1	5	88	60	11
Devonport United	11	5	0	6	63	79	10
Mount Wellington	10	3	0	7	55	117	6
Māngere United	10	1	1	8	17	133	3
Otahuhu Rovers	6	0	0	6	13	43	0

==== Third Open Grade standings ====
Ponsonby won the championship undefeated winning all 14 matches. They also won the knockout competition when they beat Marist in the final on September 13 by 10 points to 3.

Team	Pld	W	D	L	F	A	Pts
Ponsonby United	14	14	0	0	410	33	28
Kingsland Athletic	14	9	3	2	78	56	21
Glen Lynn	14	7	1	6	118	146	15
Ellerslie United	14	6	1	7	61	110	13
Marist Old Boys	14	5	2	7	80	140	12
Avondale	14	5	1	8	83	160	11
Richmond Rovers	14	3	2	9	24	170	8
Devonport United	14	2	1	11	56	89	5

==== Third Intermediate Grade standings ====
Kingsland Athletic won the championship. Newmarket won the knockout competition when they defeated Akarana/Parnell 8–2 in the final on September 13. The Parnell/Akarana side had knocked out Kingsland in the semi-finals 8 points to 0, while Newmarket had defeated Takapuna in the other. A club had formed at Takapuna in June and they entered a team in the competition to play teams on their bye. They performed well winning all three of their matches.

Team	Pld	W	D	L	F	A	Pts
Kingsland Athletic	13	10	1	2	96	20	21
Newmarket	12	10	0	2	155	48	20
Devonport United	13	8	2	3	151	20	18
Akarana/Parnell	13	5	1	7	100	68	11
Northcote and Birkenhead	13	5	0	8	69	96	10
Mount Albert United	12	1	0	11	23	282	2
Richmond Rovers	11	1	0	11	31	91	2

==== Fourth Grade standings ====
Richmond won the championship and the knockout competition. They were coached by James Francis who died at Auckland Hospital on November 24 aged just 33 leaving behind a wife (Violet) and two children. He had played for Newton Rangers in the 1920s. The Takapuna Rugby League Football Club was briefly revived midseason. The club was formed at the suburb of Milford but was named Takapuna in the fixture list. They played at least three games against teams who had byes including a first up win over Avondale on June 28 by 15 points to 2. There was no mention of them again after the following two matches.

Team	Pld	W	D	L	F	A	Pts
Richmond Rovers	21	20	1	0	323	38	41
Parnell/Akarana	21	14	3	4	183	73	31
City Rovers	19	11	0	2	130	51	22
Kingsland Athletic	20	7	3	6	122	95	17
Ponsonby United	19	6	1	8	126	90	13
Avondale	18	5	2	6	61	95	12
Point Chevalier	18	4	1	8	63	86	9
Mount Albert United	19	4	1	10	79	190	9
Devonport United	18	3	2	9	59	154	8
Papatoetoe	18	3	0	9	73	227	6
Glen Lynn	18	1	1	8	34	167	3

==== Fifth Grade standings ====
Marist won the championship with Otahuhu runner up. Marist also won the knockout competition when they beat Otahuhu in the final on September 20.

Team	Pld	W	D	L	F	A	Pts
Marist Old Boys	14	12	1	1	253	27	25
Otahuhu Rovers	14	11	2	1	131	24	24
Richmond Rovers	14	10	1	3	135	52	21
Akarana/Parnell	14	6	0	8	42	75	12
Northcote & Birkenhead Ramblers	14	5	0	9	58	64	10
Newmarket	14	4	1	9	90	123	9
Ponsonby United	14	2	1	11	37	175	5
Papatoetoe	14	2	0	12	19	228	4

==== Sixth Grade A standings ====
Point Chevalier won the championship which was played over a 24-week period with 2 full rounds being played.

Team	Pld	W	D	L	F	A	Pts
Point Chevalier	22	16	2	2	163	29	34
City Rovers	21	15	1	4	132	32	31
Marist Old Boys A	21	13	0	2	223	30	26
Newton Rangers	21	11	2	5	151	39	24
Devonport United	18	8	0	6	97	101	16
Newmarket	21	6	1	12	77	151	13
Richmond Rovers	21	5	1	12	92	160	11
Marist Old Boys B	21	3	1	11	45	134	7
Kingsland Athletic	19	2	3	11	39	146	7
Ellerslie United	24	2	1	6	12	23	5
Glen Lynn	18	0	0	10	5	165	0

==== Sixth Grade B standings ====
Richmond A won the championship and the knockout competition when they beat Point Chevalier on September 20.

Team	Pld	W	D	L	F	A	Pts
Richmond Rovers A	17	14	0	1	260	29	28
Northcote & Birkenhead Ramblers	17	14	0	1	101	27	24
Point Chevalier	18	11	0	3	135	37	22
Ellerslie United	17	10	0	3	154	46	20
Marist Old Boys	17	5	1	8	31	144	11
Richmond Rovers B	17	6	1	8	54	69	11
Devonport United	17	5	1	8	62	160	11
Avondale	17	2	0	10	34	73	4
City Rovers	17	1	0	13	10	142	2
Glen Lynn	17	0	1	9	3	117	1

==== Primary schools standings ====
Richmond won the championship by beating Akarana (Parnell) 11–8 in the final on September 20. They also won the knockout competition when they beat Otahuhu A 6 to 3 in the final on October 18.

The competition had been split into two sections and then towards the end of the season a third was added as Ponsonby, Richmond B, and Otahuhu B entered sides, each only playing 5-6 games before the end of the season. However the standings are in one table as despite their being sections sides played teams from other sections each week. Some of the teams were from individual schools such as Avondale Public School (present day Avondale Primary School), Avondale Convent School (present day St Mary's Catholic School), and Onehunga Convent School, but the majority were from several schools in the area. The Ponsonby team represented 3 Ponsonby area schools for example. On October 18 Devonport and Northcote played each other in a friendly match with Devonport winning 10–8. At halftime a goal kicking competition took place with Devonport player Verdun Scott winning it with 16 points. He was presented with a cricket bat as the winning prize and ironically would go on to not only represent New Zealand at rugby league, but also at cricket, becoming the only dual New Zealand international in those two codes. On the same day Richmond beat Otahuhu 6–3 to win the Davis Cup Challenge match.

Team	Pld	W	D	L	F	A	Pts
Richmond Schools A	17	13	0	0	197	11	26
Parnell/Akarana Schools	15	9	0	2	130	17	18
Papatoetoe Schools	14	7	1	4	73	68	15
Avondale Convent School (St Mary's Catholic School)	13	7	1	5	45	89	15
Newmarket Primary School	14	7	0	1	172	16	14
Mount Albert Schools	13	5	0	2	60	45	10
Ōtāhuhu Schools A	16	4	1	5	77	80	9
Ponsonby Schools	5	4	0	0	37	5	8
City Schools	13	3	1	2	40	76	7
Richmond Schools B	6	3	0	1	21	8	6
Ellerslie Schools	16	3	0	8	117	133	6
Devonport Schools	14	2	0	7	32	80	4
Newton Schools	15	1	1	5	20	70	3
Onehunga Convent School (St Joseph's School)	14	1	1	8	9	100	3
Māngere Schools	12	1	0	4	8	41	2
Northcote Schools	13	1	0	4	16	54	2
Ōtāhuhu Schools B	5	0	0	3	2	56	0
Avondale Public School (Avondale Primary School)	15	0	0	8	5	111	0

=== Other club and junior representative matches ===
Richmond played a preseason match in Whangarei with a team made up of Whangarei city and Hikurangi players. The match was played on the new Cossill Park before a large crowd and the local team ran out comfortable winners.

==== W McManus benefit match ====
At the end of the season Otahuhu hosted a benefit match for W. McManus who was a well-known ex-amateur runner and league player who had been ill for a long time in hospital. The match was played between Otahuhu Senior B team and the Marist A side. Marist were not at full strength but still fielded a good side. Otahuhu won 26–25.

20 September	Otahuhu	26-25	Marist	Sturges Park
3:00	Try: Farrell 2, Watson 2, Conway, McLaren; Con: Eustace 4		Try: Robert Purdy 2, Jim O'Brien, Hec Brisbane, Bert Schultz; Con: Owen Cronin 5

==== Hikurangi and City Combined v Richmond ====
At the start of the year Richmond sent their senior side to Whangarei to play a local side at the newly formed Cossill Park which later was named Jubilee Park and still exists today. The local team featured several very talent players including Ted Meyer who became a Kiwi later in the year and they were victorious 25-7 with Meyer scoring 14 of their points.

21 April	Hikurangi and City Combined	25-7	Richmond	Cossill Park, Whangarei
3:00	Try: Ted Meyer 2, R Hamilton, B Meyer, Berghan; Con: Ted Meyer 4 Drop: Crackett		Try: Paul Hintz; Pen: Joseph Hamilton 2	Referee: J Petterson

==== Huntly v Ponsonby ====
When Ponsonby had a weekend without a game they travelled to Huntly to play the local side which featured Huatahi Paki who had played for New Zealand Māori on their 1922 tour of Australia and St. George Dragons in 1923 after impressing on the tour. Ponsonby outplayed them and Doug McLeay scored two tries as breakaway forward. Ivan Kosoof scored Huntly's only points.

26 July	Huntly	3-11	Ponsonby	Huntly
3:00	Try: Ivan Kosoof		Try: Doug McLeay 2, Unknown 1 Pen: Dooley Moore	Referee: Arthur Harlock

===== Other games =====
The Auckland Junior team to play South Auckland (Waikato) on May 31 was William (Bill) Seagar, J. Meiklejohn, Horace Hunt, John Hawkes, H.A. Tate (Devonport), N. Pell, Stallworthy, Charles Dunn, Agnew, Stehr (Richmond), F. Joy, Donovan, Weavers (Marist), Ivan Wilson, Hedley White, W. White (Ponsonby), Hapi, Clarke (Mangere).

List of matches
	Date		Score		Score	Venue	Scoring
Exhibition match	19 July	Northland Juniors	8	Ponsonby Juniors	14	Whangarei	
Annual Hamilton v Northcote match	16 Aug	Northcote	9	Hamilton	0	Stafford Park, Northcote	Northcote: Tries - McCullough, Hurley, Paltridge
Exhibition match	20 Sep	Ponsonby 3rd Grade	32	Hikurangi	2	Carlaw Park # 1, 1:30pm	
Annual Hamilton v Northcote match	27 Sep	Hamilton	32	Northcote	22	Hinemoa Park, Hamilton, 3pm	
Exhibition match at Papakura	11 Oct	Richmond 2nd Grade	20	Newmarket 2nd Grade	10	Railway Reserve, Papakura	Newmarket: Hurley try, Funnell try, Mincham 2 goals, Richmond: Stehr try, Estall 2 tries, S Dunne 2 tries and another try and goal
Whangarei exhibition match	11 Oct	Northland City team	23	Parnell	12	Whangarei	
Inter-provincial junior representative Match	31 May	Auckland Juniors	14	South Auckland Juniors	2	Carlaw Park #1, 1:30pm	

=== Wednesday Competition ===
In July several businesses approached the Auckland Rugby League regarding the possibility of playing a competition between them on Wednesday's. The Auckland Rugby League agreed in August and the first matches were played on August 27. Initially there were ten teams set to enter however eventually just seven entered the competition and the Royal Billiard Saloon side failed to fulfill a fixture leaving 6 sides to compete.

==== Standings ====
Team	Pld	W	D	L	F	A	Pts
Barmen	5	4	1	0	38	17	9
New Zealand Fertilisers	5	4	0	1	27	13	8
Trotting Trainers	5	2	0	3	46	39	4
Chess Taxis	5	2	0	3	13	36	4
Private Taxis	4	1	1	2	35	42	3
Stonex Brothers Limited	4	0	0	4	12	24	0

==== Wednesday Competition fixtures ====
While there were many players with little or no experience some of the teams did feature senior grade players such as W. Skelton of Ponsonby who played for Private Taxis, and brothers F. and J. Herring who played for the Trotting Trainers. Alan Clarke also played in Private Taxi's first match, Stan Prentice played at least twice for the Trotting Trainers, and Ted Brimble played for New Zealand Fertilisers. Barmen won the competition winning 4 games and drawing one.

	Date		Score		Score	Venue
Round 1	27 August	Trotting Trainers	26	Private Taxis	10	Carlaw Park 2, 4pm
–	27 August	NZ Fertilisers	W	Stonex Bros	L	Victoria Park, 4pm
–	27 August	Barmen	14	Chess Taxis	0	Carlaw Park 1
Round 2	3 September	NZ Fertilisers	5	Chess Taxis	0	Carlaw Park 2, 3:30pm
–	3 September	Barmen	10	Trotting Trainers	9	Carlaw Park 1, 2:30pm
–	3 September	Private Taxis	ABD	Royal Billiard Ac.	ABD	Carlaw Park
Round 3	10 September	Barmen	3	Private Taxis	3	Carlaw Park 1
–	10 September	Chess Taxis	8	Stonex Bros	2	Carlaw Park 2
–	10 September	NZ Fertilisers	9	Trotting Trainers	0	Carlaw Park
Round 4	17 September	Barmen	6	NZ Fertilisers	5	Carlaw Park
–	17 September	Trotting Trainers	11	Stonex Bros	10	Carlaw Park
–	17 September	Private Taxis	15	Chess Taxis	5	Carlaw Park
Round 5	24 September	NZ Fertilisers	8	Private Taxis	7	Carlaw Park 3:30
–	24 September	Barmen	5	Stonex Bros	0	Carlaw Park 2:30
–	24 September	Chess Taxis	WBD	Trotting Trainers	LBD	Carlaw Park 2:30

==== Wednesday Competition 'final game' ====
Following the awarding of the Barmen side the championship a match was scheduled between them and players from all of the other sides. The Barmen team won 8 to 7.

1 October	Barmen	8-7	The Rest	Carlaw Park
	Try: Hudson, O'Donnell; Con: O'Donnell		Try: Stepanicic; Pen: Harding 2	Attendance: Jackson

== Representative season ==
=== Representative fixtures ===
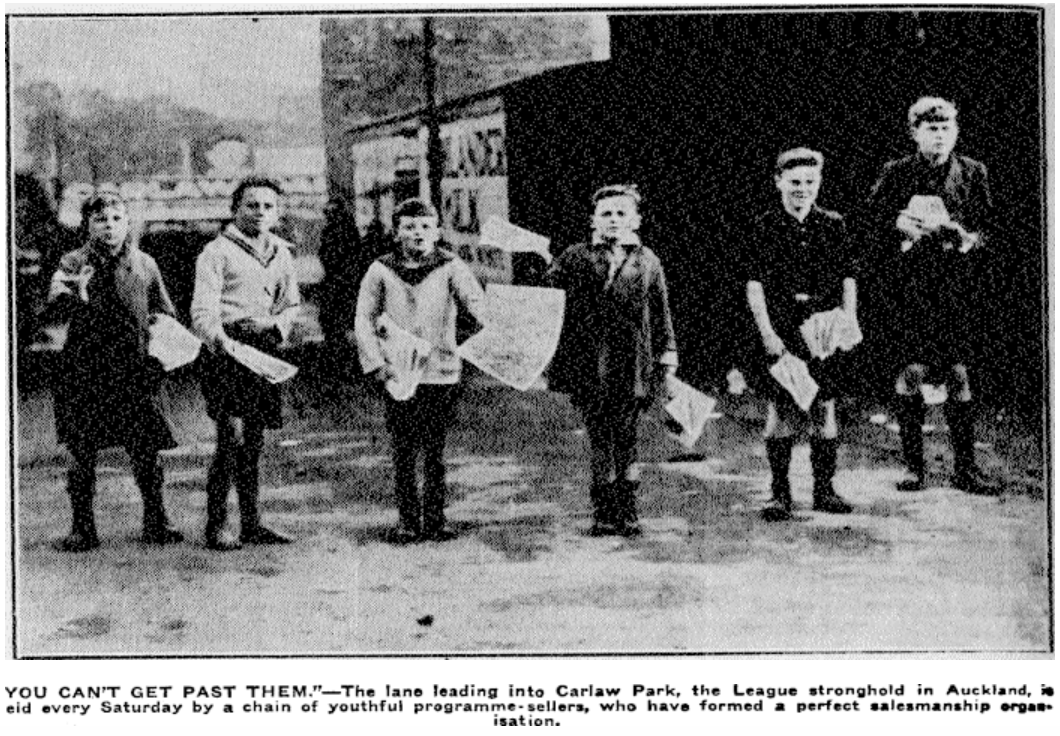
Children selling programs on the approach to Carlaw Park for the Auckland v Northland match

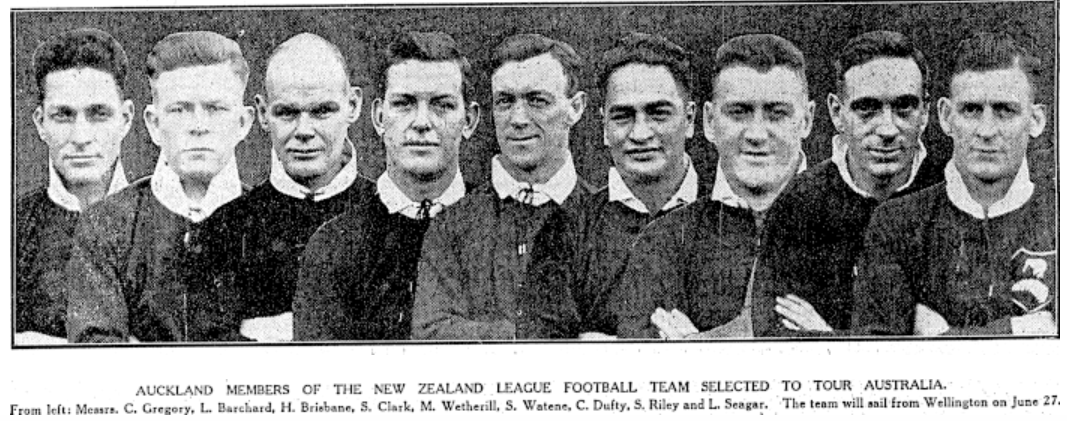
Auckland players to tour Australia, with the exception of Brian Riley (rugby league) who was unable to travel

It was a relatively quiet season for the Auckland representative side due to the fact that the New Zealand team toured Australia in the latter part of the year. They beat Northland, lost to South Auckland, and lost to the New Zealand touring team. Despite this they had 28 players represent Auckland with several on debut.

==== Auckland v Northland (Northern Union CC) ====
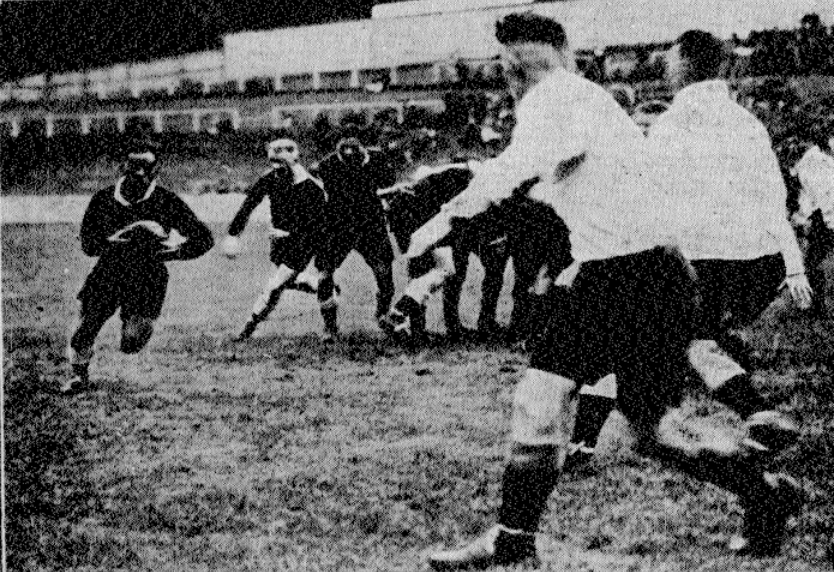
Willie Shortland with the ball and Stanley Francis and Ernest Ruby looming in support for Auckland

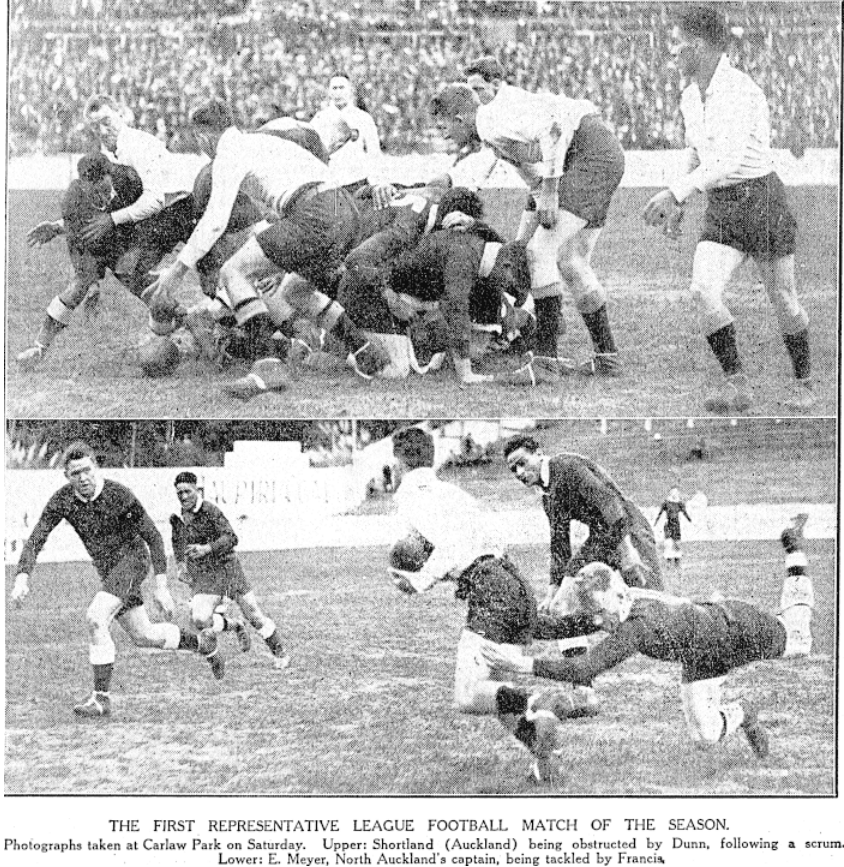
Willie Shortland the Auckland halfback being obstructed by Dunn from Northland in the upper image, while in the lower image Ted Meyer the Northland captain and NZ international is being tackled by Stanley Francis with Ernest Ruby directly behind.

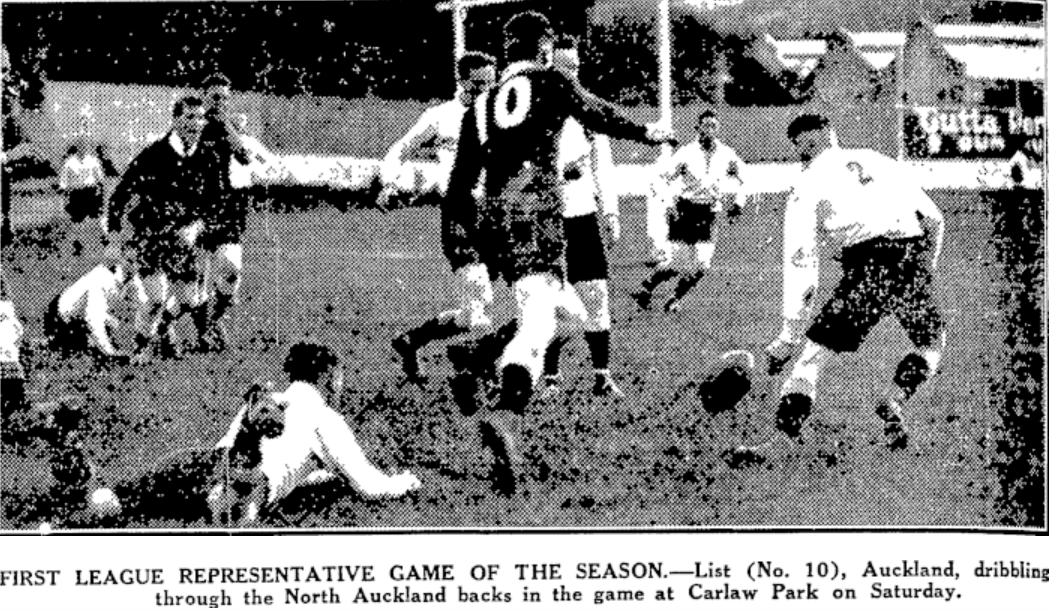
Claude List dribbling the ball through the Northland defence

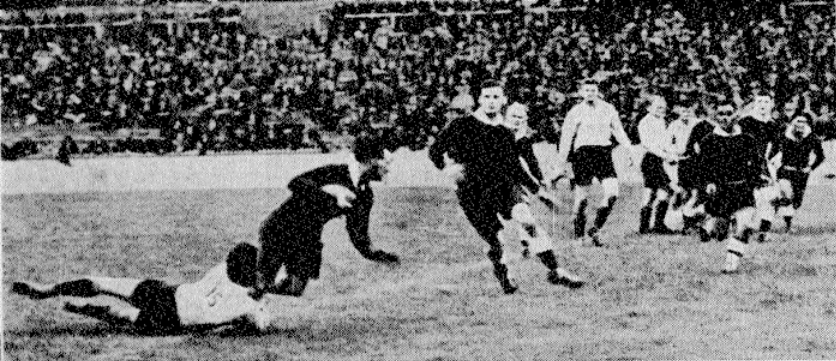
Maurice Wetherill being tackled with Allan Seagar on his inside

Auckland's first representative match of the season was against Northland who were in the throes of building the code in their area. Auckland only managed to win by the narrow margin of 21-16 before a crowd of 8,000 at Carlaw Park. Veteran five eighth, Maurice Wetherill scored for Auckland along with prop Stan Clark who had only recently transferred to the City side from Parnell. Norm Campbell (Marist), Allan Seagar (Devonport) both kicked goals for Auckland while Meyer converted two of Northland's four tries.

17 May	Auckland	21-16	Northland	Carlaw Park 1
3:00	Try: Phil Brady, Bob Carter, Maurice Wetherill, Stan Clark, Stanley Francis; Con: Norm Campbell, Allan Seagar; Pen: Allan Seagar		Try: Rod Hamilton, Ted Meyer, Alan Wells, N Dunn; Con: Ted Meyer 2	Attendance: 8,000; Referee: William Mincham

==== Auckland v South Auckland (Northern Union CC) ====
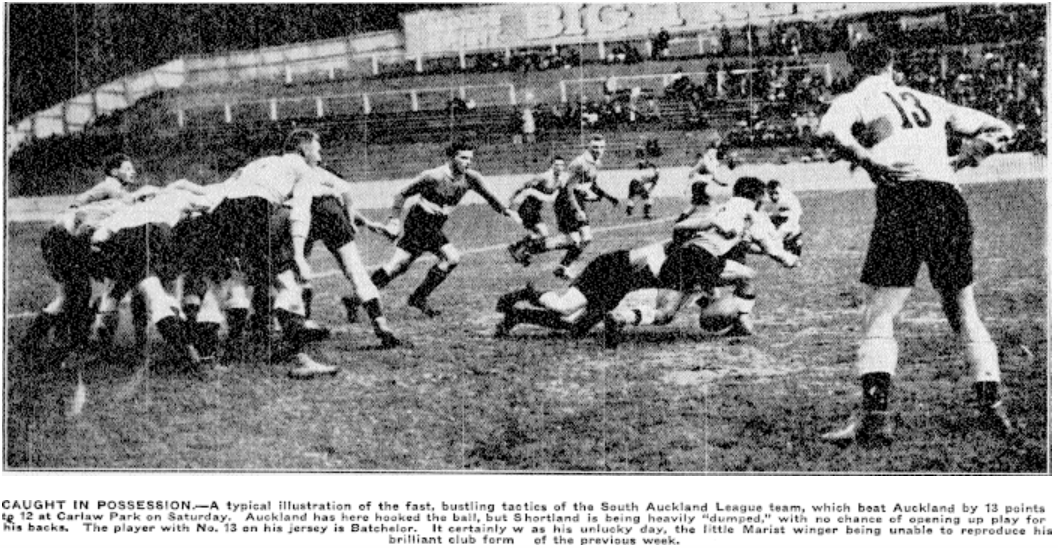
Auckland halfback William Shortland being tackled

31 May	Auckland	12-13	South Auckland	Carlaw Park 1
3:00	Try: Pat Skelton, Len Barchard; Con: Craddock Dufty, Allan Seagar; Pen: Craddock Dufty		Try: George Tittleton, Huatahi Paki, Quinn; Con: George Tittleton 2	Referee: Percy Rogers

==== New Zealand trial match ====
14 June	Probables	28-3	Possibles	Carlaw Park 1
1:30	Try: James Jones 2, Leonard Riley, Neil Hirtzel, Charles Gregory, Davis; Con: James Jones, Puti Tipene Watene, Charles Gregory 3		Try: Stanley Francis	Referee: H McKubrey

==== Inter-Island match ====
For the North Island v South Island trial the Devonport and Ponsonby clubs gave permission for their jerseys to be worn by the respective sides. Mick O’Brien of the South Island team broke his tibia late in the match.

14 June	North Island	22-22	South Island	Carlaw Park 1
2:45	Try: Hec Brisbane 2, Alan Clarke, Tom Timms; Con: Craddock Dufty 4 Pen: Craddock Dufty		Try: Herbert Pearce, T McKenzie, Mick O'Brien, Jim Calder; Con: Herbert Pearce 2, Bert Eckhoff; Pen: Herbert Pearce, Bert Eckhoff	Referee: Les Bull

==== Auckland v New Zealand ====
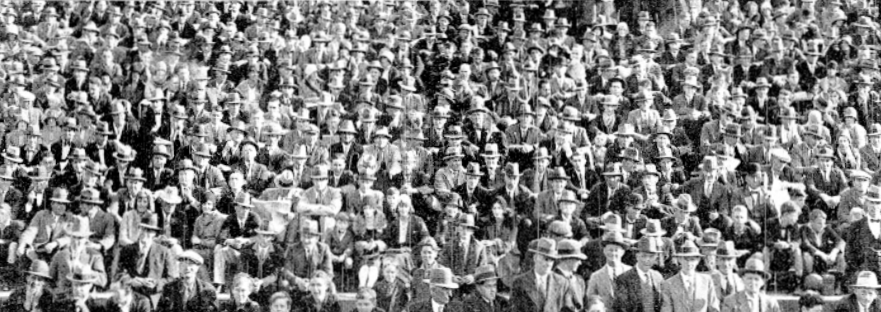
The crowd on the Carlaw Park terraces for the Auckland v New Zealand match

James Jones came on as a replacement for an injured Puti Tipene Watene. Wilf Hassan came on as a replacement for Auckland.

23 August	Auckland	27-34	New Zealand	Carlaw Park 1
3:00	Try: Phil Brady 2, Bob Carter, Ernest Ruby, Wilf Hassan; Con: Jim O'Brien 4 Pen: Jim O'Brien 2		Try: Allan Seagar 2, Edwin Abbott 4, Stan Clark, James Jones; Con: George Tittleton, Jim Amos, Bert Eckhoff 3	Referee: Les Bull

=== Auckland Representative matches played and points scored ===
No	Name	Club Team	Played	Tries	Con	Pen	Points
1	Jim O'Brien	Marist	3	0	4	2	12
2	Phil Brady	Marist	2	3	0	0	9
3	Robert (Bob) Carter	Kingsland	2	2	0	0	6
4	Allan Seagar	Devonport	2	0	2	1	6
5	Craddock Dufty	Ellerslie	1	0	1	1	4
6	Maurice Wetherill	City	2	1	0	0	3
6	Stan Clark	City	2	1	0	0	3
6	Ernest Ruby	Devonport	2	1	0	0	3
6	Stanley Francis	Newton	1	1	0	0	3
6	Pat Skelton	Ponsonby	1	1	0	0	3
6	Len Barchard	City	1	1	0	0	3
6	Wilf Hassan	Marist	1	1	0	0	3
13	Norm Campbell	Marist	1	0	1	0	2
14	Willie Shortland	City	3	0	0	0	0
14	Alan Clarke	Marist	2	0	0	0	0
14	Norm Pascoe	City	2	0	0	0	0
14	George Perry	City	2	0	0	0	0
14	Claude List	Kingsland	1	0	0	0	0
14	Mita Watene	City	1	0	0	0	0
14	Hec Brisbane	Marist	1	0	0	0	0
14	George Batchelor	Marist	1	0	0	0	0
14	Merv Lee	Richmond	1	0	0	0	0
14	Leonard Riley	Ponsonby	1	0	0	0	0
14	Stan Prentice	Richmond	1	0	0	0	0
14	Pat Young	Marist	1	0	0	0	0
14	A Hobbs	Ellerslie	1	0	0	0	0
14	Victor Fagan	Ponsonby	1	0	0	0	0
14	C Stevens	Ponsonby	1	0	0	0	0

== Annual general meetings and club news ==
- Auckland Rugby League was held at the Chamber of Commerce on Swanson Street on Monday 7 April. The meeting showed that there was a profit of £1742 10/. Maintenance of Carlaw Park cost £419 6/, rates £78 0/8, office rent £235 4/ and entertaining visitors £67 18/2. Much of the discussion at the meeting was centred around the appointment of referees for matches.
- Auckland Rugby League Junior Management Committee held at Grey's Buildings on Tuesday 25 March.
- Primary School Management Committee met on 15 May. There were twenty delegates. It was reported that 15 school teams would enter with four new clubs (Avondale, Northcote, City, and Papatoetoe).
- Auckland Rugby League Referees Association held in the League Rooms on Monday, 31 March.
- Akarana Rugby League Football Club held at Carlaw Park on Tuesday 1 April.
- Avondale League Football Club held at Hick's Tearooms, Fearon's Corner, Avondale, Auckland on 10 March. This meeting was held to see if there was interest in forming a club. About 75 people attended and it was decided that the club should be called Avondale League Football Club after the initial notice in the newspaper had named them Suburbs, the same name of the existing rugby union club. They also decided to enter teams in the 3rd Open, 4th, 5th, and 6th grades, and that the Avondale Convent were also prepared to find a team. The club colours would be green with a red band. Their first annual general meeting was held at Watson's Fruit Shop, Avondale on Monday 17 March. They were to hold their first ever practice on the Avondale Racecourse on the following Saturday. At the end of the season on Monday, 6 October the club held a general meeting at Lesser Town Hall.
- City Rovers held at Carlaw Park on Sunday, 23 March. There was a “record attendance of sixty players” at the meeting. The accounts were in credit by £43. It was noted that Ben Davidson (rugby league) had arrived back in Auckland from England and was expected to play for the club.
- Devonport United Football Club held at the Committee Rooms, corner of Clarence Street and Victoria Road, Devonport on Thursday 20 March. At the 12th annual meeting the committee's report showed that the balance sheet showed a credit balance of £99. They had started the previous season with 100 players and the juniors won the third grade intermediate grade and fourth grade. The ladies’ social committee had held dances which had generated £90 profit. One of the men who formed the Devonport Club, Mr. D.W. McLean resigned from the New Zealand Council owing to his health. He had formed the North Shore Albions at Devonport, and took a prominent part in forming Newton Rangers, Ponsonby, and the Northcote and Birkenhead Rambers. He was also involved strongly in other aspects of the foundation of the Rugby League game in Auckland and New Zealand.
- Ellerslie United League Football Club held their annual meeting at their training shed on Monday, 10 March. The club gained the services of Wally Somers from Newton who was a New Zealand representative while Craddock Dufty would again turn out for the team.
- New Lynn League Football Club held at New Lynn billiard saloon on Wednesday 19 March.
- Kingsland Athletic held at the Buffalo Lodge Rooms, St Benedicts Street on Thursday 27 March. The annual meeting showed a credit balance of £12.
- Marist Brothers Old Boys League Football Club held at Donovan's Gym in Parnell, New Zealand on Tuesday 25 March.
- Mangere Rugby League Football Club held in Jones’ Confectionary Hall, Onehunga on Thursday 20 March. This meeting was held with a view to forming a club which would be a combination of Mangere and Manukau.
- Mt. Albert United Rugby League Football Club held at King George Hall, Mt Albert on Thursday 6 March. The club advertised for practices to be held for Senior B and all other grades to be held on Saturday, 12 April on its own ground at the foot of Springleigh Avenue, Mt Albert which would most likely be the present day Phyllis Street Reserve area.
- Mount Wellington Rugby League Football Club were holding practices at their club's ground at Westfield.
- Newmarket Rugby League Club held at the Club Room, 265, Khyber Pass Road on Thursday 27 February. The meeting was adjourned and continued at the Orient Tea Rooms, Broadway on Thursday, 10 April.
- Newton Rangers Football Club held at the Y.M.C.A. Buildings, Wellesley Street East on Monday, 3 March.
- Northcote and Birkenhead Ramblers Football Club held at Foresters’ Hall, Birkenhead on Thursday 20 March. The 20th annual meeting of the club was overseen by Mr. A.E. Greenslade with a large attendance. The membership was totalled at 99. The finishing positions of all its team was noted. H. Simpson was awarded a medal for consistency in the senior team. The Northcote Borough Council was informed by Auckland Rugby League that it was not in a position to spend any money on forming a football ground at the eastern end of the Kauri Gully scenic reserve.
- Otahuhu Rugby League Football Club It was decided to enter teams in the Senior B, Fourth, Fifth, Sixth A, Sixth B, and Schoolboy competitions.
- Papatoetoe Rugby League Club: During the season with Auckland Rugby League struggling to gain access to enough playing fields, the president of the Papatoetoe Welfare League, Mr. S.J.E. Closey wrote to Auckland Rugby League suggesting the use of some of the flat land in the area. Some of which was in Mulcock's reserve which was in a natural amphitheatre. His land was at the site of present-day Peverill Crescent adjacent to Kohuora Park where the Papatoetoe Panthers club is located and most likely the exact same location due to its amphitheatre situation.
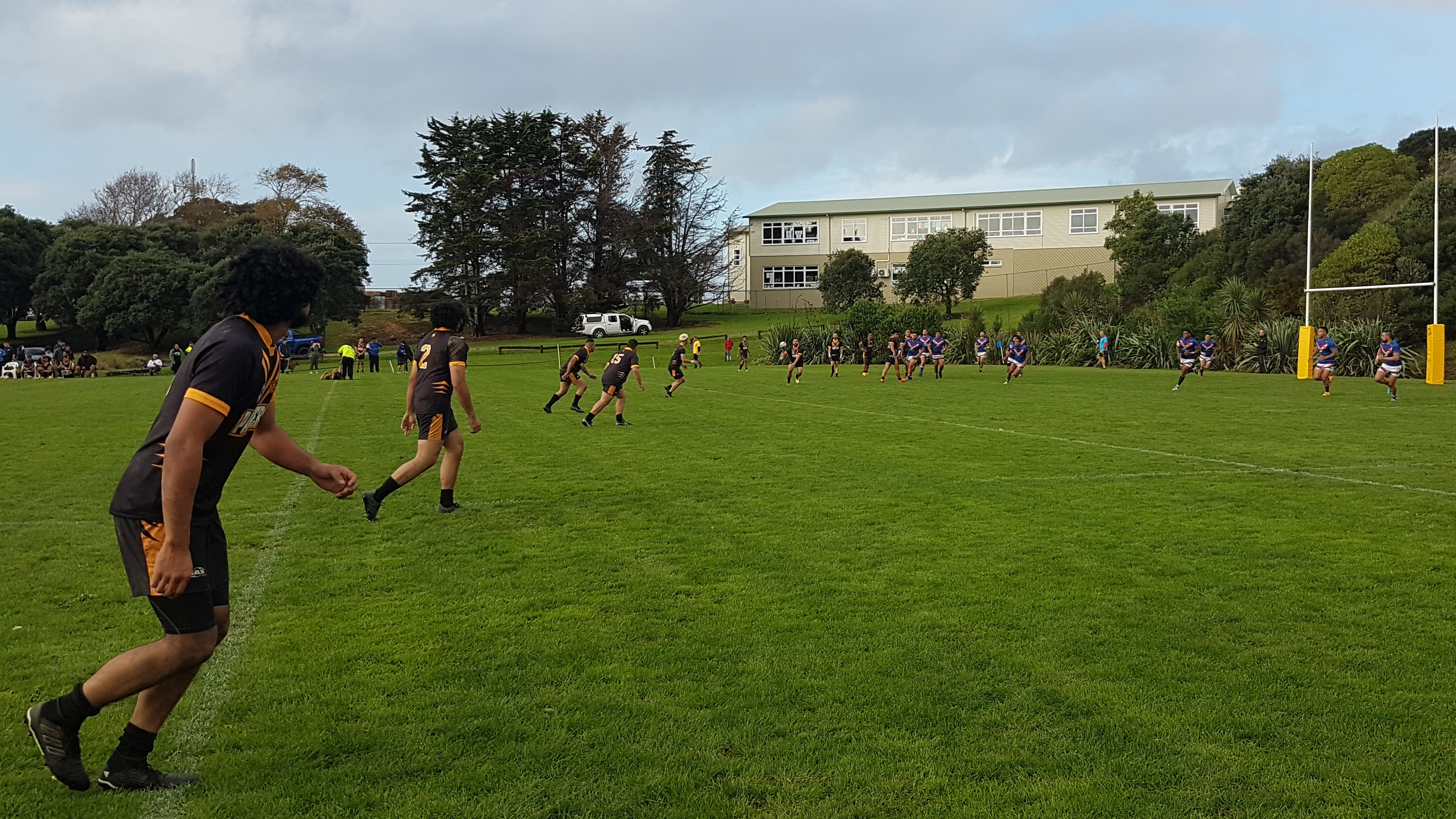
  Present day Kohuora Park in its sunken amphitheatre location in central Papatoetoe.
- Parnell League Football Club held at Donovan's Gymnasium, First Section, Parnell on 10 March.
- Point Chevalier League Football Club held at the Sailing Club Hall on Wednesday 26 March. The meeting showed that the club hoped to field six teams and were £30 in profit.
- Ponsonby United Football Club held at Leys Institute, on Monday 10 March.
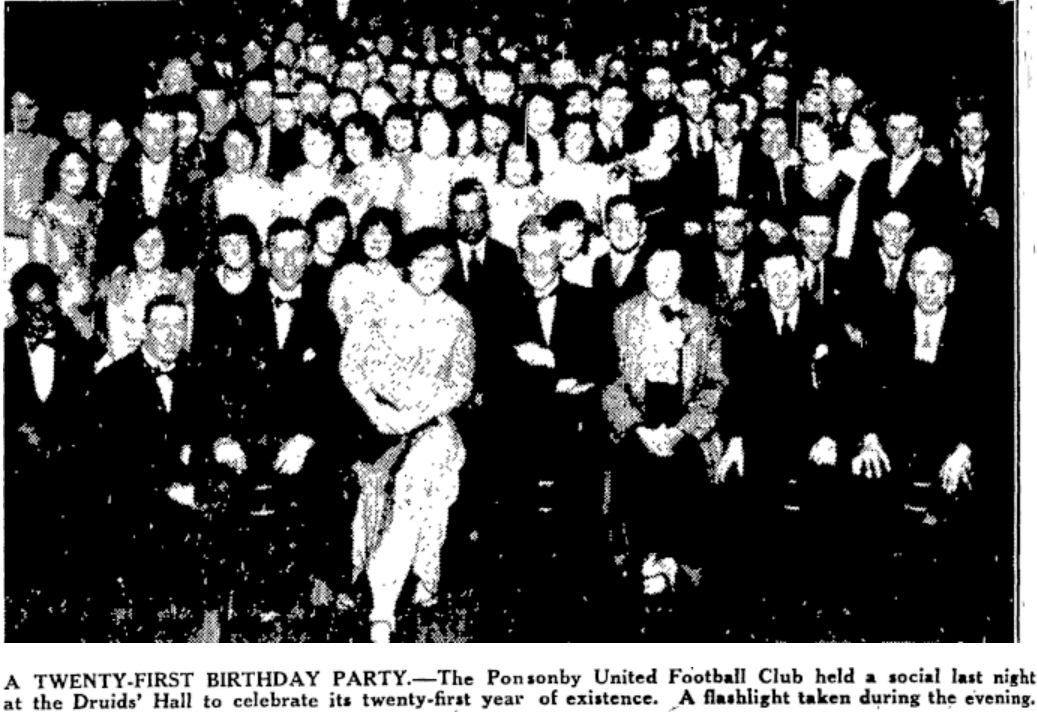
  Ponsonby celebrated their 21st anniversary with a social on October 13.
  It was reported that the club had accumulated funds of £20 for the year and had total assets exceeding liabilities by £430. Medals were presented to A. Payne for being the most consistent forward, L. Riley the most consistent back, and to C. Moore as the most versatile player. J. Norman received a trophy as the most consistent fourth grade player.
- Richmond Rovers Football Club held at the Gaiety Hall, Surrey Crescent on Monday 24 March. Mr. Milicich presented the club with a cup to be awarded to the team with the fewest points scored against it. It was noted that the following teams won their respective grades in 1929: Third Grade Open, Fifth Grade, Sixth Grade A, Sixth Grade B.
