= Len Barchard =

New Zealand international rugby league player (1909-1975)

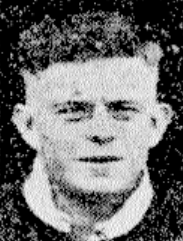

Personal information
- Full name: Leonard Barchard
- Born: 3 February 1909 Freeman's Bay, Auckland, New Zealand
- Died: 14 July 1975 (aged 66) Central Coast, New South Wales, Australia

Playing information
- Height: 172.5 cm (5 ft 8 in)
- Weight: 82.6 kg (13 st 0 lb)
- Position: Second-row, Hooker, Wing
Club
Years	Team	Pld	T	G	FG	P
1929–32	City Rovers	40	7	0	0	21
1933	Devonport United	5	0	0	0	0
1935–37	Marist Old Boys	4	1	0	0	3
	Total	49	8	0	0	24
Representative
Years	Team	Pld	T	G	FG	P
1930	Auckland	1	1	0	0	3
1930	New Zealand Probables	1	0	0	0	0
1930	New Zealand	2	0	0	0	0
- Father: Samuel Joseph Barchard
- Relatives: Des Barchard (nephew)

Leonard Barchard (3 February 1909 – 14 July 1975) represented the New Zealand rugby league team in 1930, becoming the 203rd Kiwi. He played one match on their tour of Australia and another against Auckland on his return. He also played for Auckland while representing three clubs in the Auckland Rugby League competition, City Rovers, Devonport United, and Marist Old Boys. He was the uncle of Kiwi, Des Barchard, while his brother Lawrence (Laurie) played seniors for City also, while another brother Victor played seniors for Marist Old Boys.

== Early life ==
Barchard was born on 3 February 1909 to Annie Barchard (nee Guerin) and Samuel Joseph Barchard. He had six siblings; Eileen Barchard (1913-1914), and half siblings to his fathers second wife Johanna Josephine Annie Keane who were; Mary Kathleen Veronica Barchard (1911-?), Annie Thelma Mildred Barchard (1912-2001), Victor Joseph John Barchard (1914-1990), Verdun Vivian Josephine Barchard (1916-1986), and Edna Mona Marjorie Barchard (1918-?).

== Playing career ==
=== City Rovers ===
Barchard began playing rugby league for City Rovers senior side in 1929 after transferring there from Ponsonby United at the beginning of the season. He debuted against Ellerslie on 4 May in the second row. His older brother Lawrence (‘Laurie’ in match reports) was playing at fullback for City Rovers also after debuting in 1928. Len wasn't mentioned in a match report until he was said to do “excellent work in the tight” in their round 5 match against Newton Rangers. He finished the 1929 season playing 15 matches for City Rovers who finished 3rd in the championship with a 9 win, 5 loss record.

=== Auckland selection ===
Barchard played four matches for City in 1930 and was in good form scoring two tries. He gained selection for Auckland for their 31 May match at Carlaw Park with South Auckland (Waikato) after initially being selected in the training squad. He was named in the hooking position alongside props Stan Clark and Skelton at Carlaw Park. It was said that Barchard had won selection by the “sheer merit of his performances in club games” thus far. Barchard scored second half try when he “dashed across following up-and-under tactics by Wetherill. Seagar converted it drawing Auckland to within a point however South Auckland hung on to win 13–12. It was said that he was “prominent throughout”.

=== New Zealand selection ===
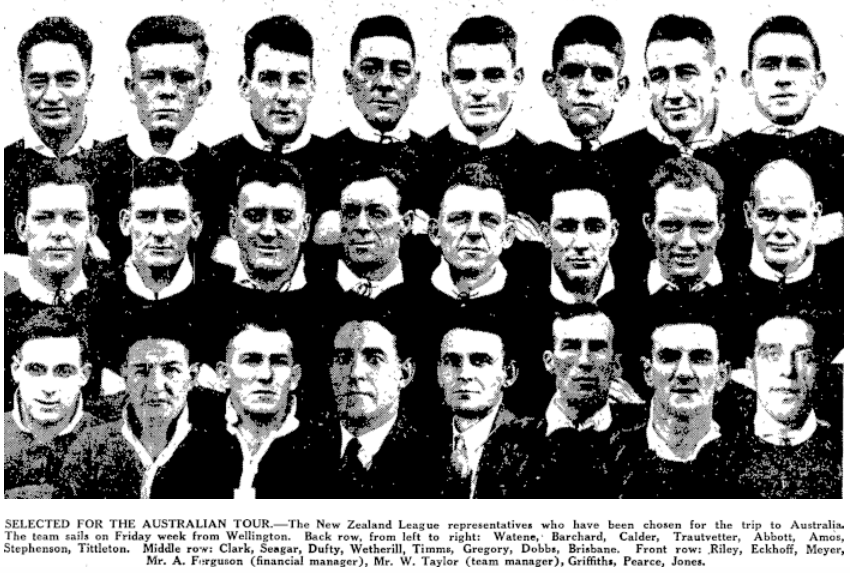

He then played a match for City against Devonport United and scored a try before gaining selection in the New Zealand trial match for the New Zealand Probables side. The match was played as a curtain-raiser to the North Island-South Island match at Carlaw Park. He was selected in the second row alongside Hertsell of Northland. The matches were part of the selection process to find the New Zealand team for the 1930 tour of Australia. Following the matches Barchard was selected for the tour and along with Stan Clark were the only Auckland players named in the forwards. His Probables side had an easy 28–3 win over the Possibles and it was said that he was “prominent” along with Hamilton in his side. The New Zealand Truth reported that “Young Len Barchard played the game of his life in the pack”.

The New Zealand touring team departed Wellington for Australia on 27 June for Sydney on board the Huddart Parker steamer Ulimaron.

New Zealand played 13 matches on the tour. However, Barchard only played one match, which was the third of the tour against New South Wales. He played in the second row and seriously injured his arm, requiring him to leave the field and ruling him out of the tour. New Zealand lost two other players to injury and with the no replacement rule in the second half found themselves down to 10 men and they went on to lose 29–2 at the Sydney Cricket Ground before a crowd of 19,060. Early in the match with New Zealand trailing 5–0 Hec Brisbane put New Zealand on attack but “Barchard knocked on, missing a certain try”. He later suffered his injury which was to his arm while making a tackle when New Zealand was behind 10–2.

After New Zealand's return from the tour they played Auckland at Carlaw Park on 23 August. Barchard had recovered enough to play in the second row with New Zealand running out winners 34–27. In the first half he made a break but made a poor pass to Abbot and New Zealand missed their chance at a try then late in the match with New Zealand leading 26–17 he made another break and passed to Amos who sent it on to Seagar who scored. During the game he was taken out of the scrum and played as an extra back and was said to have “made clever openings, showing a side-step and swerve which are essential for a five-eighths. Barchard has plenty of pace and his game was so impressive that City intends giving him further chances as a five-eighths”.

He then returned to the City Rovers side and played four matches before the season finished. City finished the 1930 season as runners up in the championship to Ponsonby United. In the 1931 season he played 14 more matches for City Rovers but his representative career had perhaps surprisingly come to an end with other players favoured over him for the Auckland side. During the season he scored four tries and spent some time in the backline.

=== Semi-retirement and transfer to Devonport and then Marist ===
Barchard began the season with City but seemingly only played in the 30 April game against Newton as he was not listed in any team line ups beyond this point. On 28 September he played in a company match for Atwaters Piano Company against Amalgamated Picture Theatres where it appears he was working with a brother as there were two Barchards named in the side.

In April 1933 he transferred from City to Devonport United while his brother Lawrence had also departed City and was now playing for Newton Rangers. He was named in the top side for their pre-season match with Marist Old Boys and was listed at lock until early June before he stopped being listed in the side. He did not play at all in 1934 and then in early 1935 he transferred to Marist Old Boys. He only played one match for them on 27 April against his former Devonport side and he scored a try in a 17 all draw.

In 1936 his younger brother Vic transferred from Parnell to City Rovers and then transferred again to join Len at Marist though he played in the reserve grade. Vic later became more established in the first grade side and represented Auckland in 1941.

== Personal life ==
Barchard married Berenice Marjorie Hanlon (1912-1995) at St Patrick's Cathedral, Auckland, on 28 December 1935. They had a son, Peter Leonard Barchard (1940-2020) on 18 October 1940 while they were living in Mission Bay, Auckland.

Barchard died in New South Wales, Australia, on 14 July 1975.
