= Harold Abbott (rugby union) =

New Zealand rugby union player

- Born: Harold Louis Abbott; 17 June 1882 Camerontown, Waikato, New Zealand
- Died: 16 January 1971 (aged 88) Palmerston North, New Zealand
- Height: 1.79 m (5 ft 10 in)
- Weight: 82 kg (181 lb)
- Notable relative: Edwin Abbott (nephew)
- Occupation: Farrier

Rugby union career
- Position: Wing
Provincial / State sides
| Years | Team | Apps | (Points) |
| – | Taranaki | | |
| - | Wanganui | | |
| 1906 | British Columbia | 1 | (3) |
International career
| Years | Team | Apps | (Points) |
| 1905–06 | New Zealand | 1 | (8) |

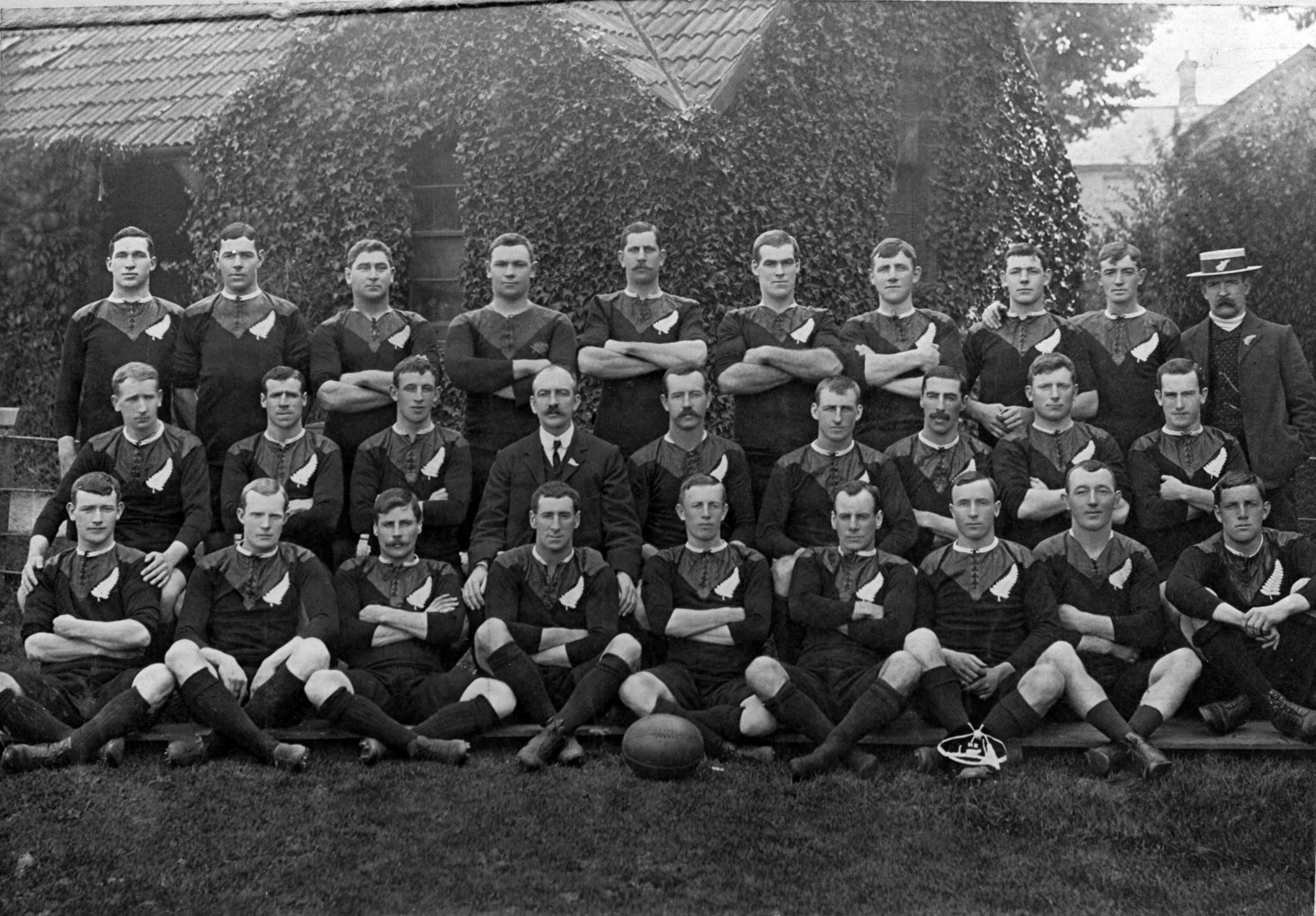
All Blacks rugby union team: Top Row — J. Corbett, W. Johnstone, W. Cunningham, P. Newton, G. Nicholson, C. Seeling, J. O'Sullivan, A. McDonald, D. McGregor, J. Duncan (coach). Middle Row — E .J. Harper, W. J. Wallace, J. W. Stead (vice-captain), G. W. Dixon (manager), D. Gallaher (captain), J. Hunter, G. Gillett, F. Glasgow, W. Mackrell. Bottom Row — S. Casey, H. L .Abbott, G. W. Smith, F. Roberts, H. D. Thompson, H. J. Mynott, E. E. Booth, G. A. Tyler, R. G. Deans.

Harold "Bunny" Louis Abbott (17 June 1882 – 16 January 1971) was a New Zealand rugby union footballer. A wing three-quarter, Abbott represented Taranaki and Wanganui at a provincial level, and was a member of the New Zealand national side, the All Blacks, from 1905 to 1906. He was a member of the legendary 1905 Original All Blacks, and played 11 matches for the team, scoring 47 points. He won his sole Test cap for New Zealand on 1 January 1906 against France. He also made one appearance as a guest player for British Columbia against the All Blacks, when the former team were short of players.

He was the uncle of New Zealand rugby league international Edwin Abbott.

Abbott died in Palmerston North in 1971 and was buried in Kelvin Grove Cemetery.
