= James Jones (rugby league) =

New Zealand international rugby league player

Personal information
- Full name: James Jones
- Born: 1905; New Zealand
- Died: Deceased; New Zealand

Playing information
- Weight: 12 st 0 lb (76 kg)
- Position: Lock
Club
Years	Team	Pld	T	G	FG	P
1925–31	Huntly
1932	Devonport United	1	1	0	0	3
	Total	1	1	0	0	3
Representative
Years	Team	Pld	T	G	FG	P
1930	South Auckland
1930	New Zealand	3	0	0	0	0

James Jones (fl. 1930) was a New Zealand rugby league player.

A loose forward, Jones played for South Auckland provincially. He was a member of the Huntly club.

He toured Australia in 1930 with the New Zealand national side, a tour where no test matches were played. In 1932 he joined the North Shore Albions club in Auckland, then known as Devonport United but only played one match for them.
