= Bill Deacon =

New Zealand international rugby league footballer (1944–2019)

Personal information
- Full name: William George Deacon
- Born: 22 February 1944 Thames, New Zealand
- Died: 18 June 2019 (aged 75) Wagga Wagga, New South Wales, Australia

Playing information
- Position: Second-row, Loose forward
Club
Years	Team	Pld	T	G	FG	P
	Ngaruawahia Panthers
1973–75	Wagga Wagga Magpies
1976–92	Junee Diesels
	Turvey Park Lions
	Total	0	0	0	0	0
Representative
Years	Team	Pld	T	G	FG	P
	Waikato
1965–71	New Zealand	14	0	0	0	0
- Relatives: Edwin Abbot (uncle)

William George Deacon (22 February 1944 – 18 June 2019) was a New Zealand rugby league footballer who represented New Zealand in the 1970 World Cup.

== Early life and family ==
Born in Thames on 22 February 1944, Deacon was the son of George Deacon and Olive Susie Deacon (née Abbott). His uncle, Edwin Abbott, also played for the New Zealand Kiwis.

== Playing career ==
Deacon played for the Ngaruawahia Panthers in the Waikato Rugby League competition and represented Waikato. He was first selected for the New Zealand national rugby league team in 1965. That year he was also named the New Zealand Rugby League player of the year.

Deacon was included in the Kiwis squad for the 1970 World Cup and played his last test match for New Zealand in 1971. He finished his career having played in fourteen tests for New Zealand.

== Death ==
Deacon died in Australia on 18 June 2019.
