= Edwin Abbott (rugby league) =

NZ international rugby league footballer

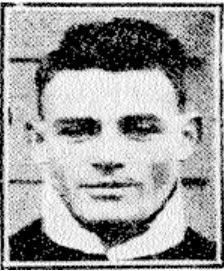

Personal information
- Full name: Edwin Frederick Abbott
- Born: 9 November 1908; Dominion of New Zealand
- Died: 3 May 1976 (aged 67); Ngāruawāhia, New Zealand

Playing information
- Weight: 9 st 3 lb (59 kg)
- Position: Halfback, Wing
Club
Years	Team	Pld	T	G	FG	P
1926–32	Ngaruawahia	39	17	8	0	67
1933	Richmond Rovers	21	3	0	0	9
	Total	60	20	8	0	76
Representative
Years	Team	Pld	T	G	FG	P
1926–32	Lower Waikato	6	1	0	0	3
1926–32	South Auckland	15	4	0	0	12
1928–32	Waikato Trial	8	0	0	0	0
1930	NZ Probables	1	0	0	0	0
1931	North Island	1	2	0	0	6
1930–32	New Zealand	15 (2)	8 (1)	0	0	24 (3)
1932	New Zealand XIII	1	0	0	0	0
1933	B Team (AKL Trial)	1	1	0	0	3
- Relatives: Bill Deacon (nephew)

Edwin Frederick Abbott (9 November 1908 – 3 May 1976) was a New Zealand rugby league footballer who represented New Zealand in 1930 and 1932.

Abbott was the nephew of 1905 All Black Harold Abbott and the uncle of Bill Deacon, a Kiwi from 1965 to 1971.

== Playing career ==
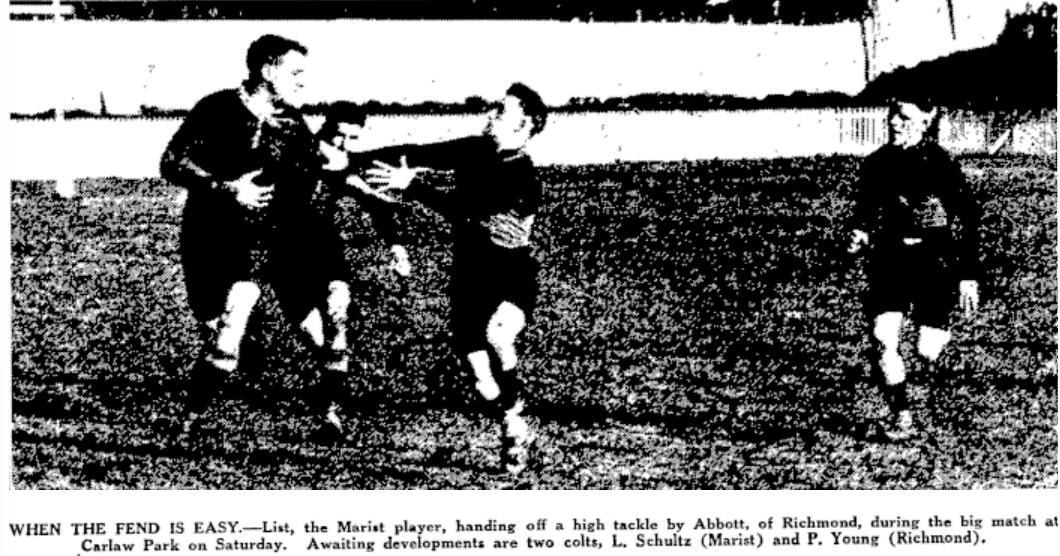
Abbott being fended off by Claude List (Marist) in their Roope Rooster semi final win in 1933 at Carlaw Park.

From the Ngaruawahia Panthers club, Abbott represented South Auckland and the North Island. In 1930 he was selected for the New Zealand tour of New South Wales, playing in both matches against New South Wales and scoring three tries against Sydney Metropolis.

He played for South Auckland against both the 1928 and 1932 touring Great Britain Lions. In 1932 he played for New Zealand in two tests against Great Britain, scoring one try. In 1933 he moved to Auckland to join the Richmond Rovers club to play in the Auckland Rugby League competition joining Bert Cooke, the All Black who had joined Richmond the season prior.
