= Albert Laing =

New Zealand international rugby league player

Personal information
- Full name: Albert Laing
- Born: 30 July 1908 Waihi, Waikato, New Zealand
- Died: 18 January 1962 (aged 53) Auckland, New Zealand

Playing information
- Position: Stand-off, Fullback
Club
Years	Team	Pld	T	G	FG	P
1931–34	Devonport United	45	3	41	0	91
1932	Newton XIII (guest)	1	0	3	0	6
1934	Ponsonby XIII (guest)	1	0	1	0	2
	Total	47	3	45	0	99
Representative
Years	Team	Pld	T	G	FG	P
1931–33	Auckland	4	0	1	0	2
1932	NZ Probables	1	1	2	0	7
1932	North Island	1	0	3	0	6
1932	New Zealand	1	0	3	0	6
- Relatives: Bert Laing (brother)

Albert Laing was a rugby league player who represented New Zealand in 1932 against England becoming Kiwi #217. He played club rugby league for Devonport United from 1931 to 1934 and made 4 appearances for Auckland, and 1 for the North Island.

== Early life ==
Albert Laing was born on 30 July 1908 in New Zealand to Fanny Nelmes Laing (nee Buffett) (1965-1933) and Edward Baron Laing (1856-1953). His parents were originally from Norfolk Island but moved to New Zealand with several young children in 1901 and lived at Rocky Point in Auckland. Albert was part of a very large family with 13 siblings; Edgar Nolton (1890-1969), Henry Bircher (1893-1968), Alice May (1895-1895), Edith Esther (1896-1992), Julius Cecil Churchill (1900-1982), Norman Paul (1900-1975), Edward Alfred Robert (1902-1983), Jessie Elizabeth (1903-1966), Rita Anne Annie (1905-1990), William (b 1906), Robert, Augustus Buffett, Helena Buffett, and Alphonso Bennett. His brother Henry Bircher Laing (better known as Bert Laing) also played for rugby league for New Zealand from 1919 to 1925.

== Playing career ==
=== Devonport United (North Shore Albions) juniors ===
Albert Laing began his rugby league playing career at the Devonport United club on the North Shore of Auckland where his older brother Bert, was playing. Another brother Julius also played for Devonport in the 1920s. Albert played in the junior grades from at least 1925 until he eventually made his first grade debut in 1931. While playing a game in 1928 aged 19 he broke his leg and was taken to Auckland Hospital. The following season he won the Brown Medal for the best 2nd Grade player at the Devonport club and was also selected at fullback for the Auckland junior representative side. It is unclear if he played for Devonport in 1930 but in 1931 he began the season in the reserve grade side.

=== Auckland and Devonport debuts ===
Remarkably Albert Laing’s first grade debut was actually in a representative match for Auckland. Auckland was playing Northland at Carlaw Park on 26 September. Northland was a relatively new representative side and so the Auckland selectors took the opportunity to blood several younger players. They were said to have had “difficulty in securing an inside five-eighths left the selectors in a quandary, and finally Laing, a Devonport reserve grade player, was obtained”. Laing was said to have “played fairly well, but could not make play for his threequarters”. The match ended in a 19-19 draw.

A week later on 3 October, Laing did make his long awaited senior grade debut for Devonport in the Stormont Shield final 25-6 win over Marist Old Boys. Then on 10 October he played five eighth against the touring Eastern Suburbs side from Sydney. Eastern Suburbs won 41-27. Laing scored a try late in the match after following a high kick which came down near the goal line.

=== Devonport and North Island ===
Laing played 13 matches for Devonport during the 1932 season scoring a try and kicking four goals. He had shifted into the fullback position at the start of the season. Laing had played nine matches and been consistently good at fullback when he was selected for the Probables-Possibles match on 16 July. The match was a curtain raiser to the Auckland XIII – South Auckland match. Laing played particularly well and scored a try and kicked 2 conversions in a 26-12 win for his side. The New Zealand Herald reported that he played a “splendid game” along with Ted Brimble and Allan Seagar. His try came after he made a break on halfway and after three others handled he received the ball back and crossed the line, converting his own try. Later he “beat several defenders before passing to Thompson…”, in the second half he made another break but was stopped by Frank Delgrosso and nearly scored before full time, being tackled on the line. Three days later he was selected in the North Island side for their annual fixture with the South Island ahead of Norm Campbell. It was said that he “gained his place on the sheer merit and versatile display at the weekend, added to which his club performances have been a recommendation”. He kicked 3 conversions (2 from wide out) in the North Island’s 27-18 win over the South Island in front of 15,000 spectators at Carlaw Park.

=== New Zealand test v England ===
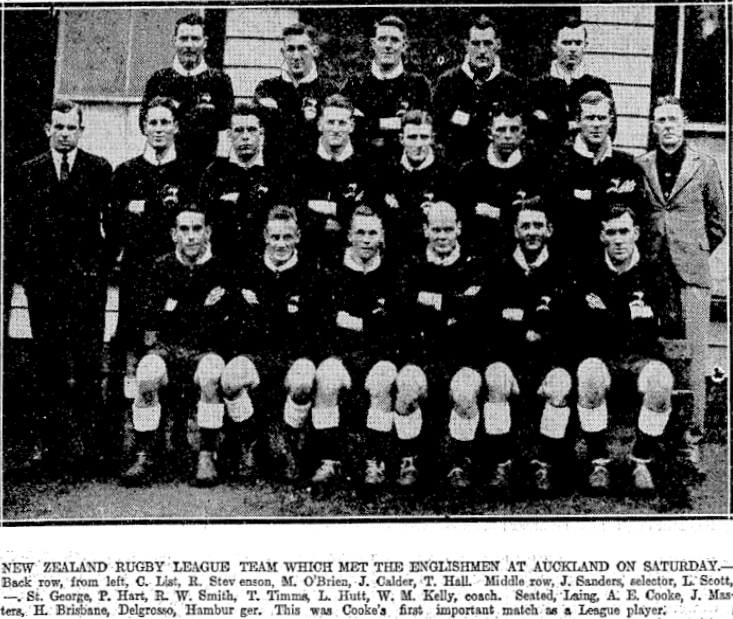
Albert Laing in the front row on the left of the NZ 1st test team.

Following the Inter-island match Albert Laing was selected in the first test team for New Zealand to play England. It was said that the “New Zealand selectors have placed a big responsibility on Laing, the youthful fullback. The Auckland custodian has given good displays in club matches, but he lacks experience in comparison to Sullivan, who is likely to make Laing’s task a more difficult one”.

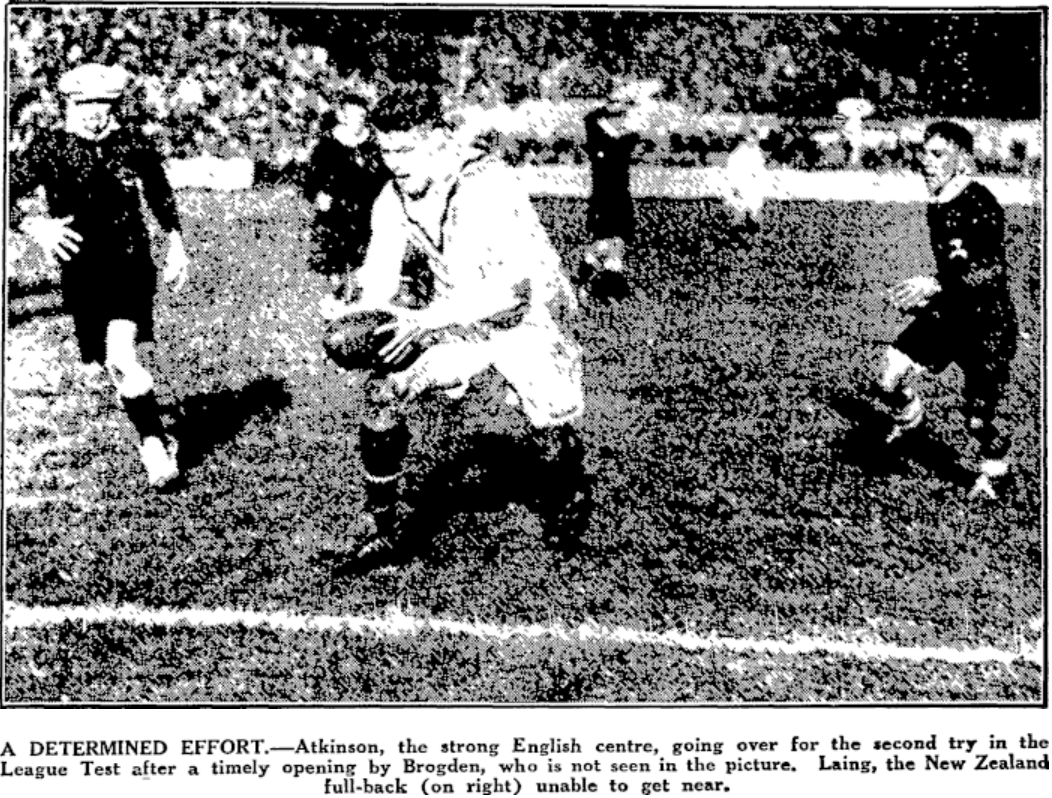
Laing unable to get to Brogden of England who scores in the first test.

The first test was played at Carlaw Park on 30 July before a crowd of 25,000. New Zealand was well beaten 24-9. Laing converted Bert Cooke’s try and kicked 2 penalties however he was said to have had an indifferent game. He opened the scoring with a “neat” penalty goal early in the match. A short time later the English wing Alf Ellaby “beat Laing badly and scored a nice try”. Laing then kicked a second penalty goal from twenty-five yards out to give New Zealand a 4-3 lead before converting Cooke’s try making it 9-6 in New Zealand’s favour at halftime. Later in the match England, through Evans intercepted a pass from Lou Hutt and “Laing made no attempt to tackle Ellaby” who had received the ball from Joe Thompson. Near the end of the match “weak play by Laing and Smith gave England another try” and the match ended soon after. Laing was then dropped from the side for the second test. The Auckland Star reported that he “showed that, apart from not being the fullback type, he was unequal to international requirements in that position”. He was replaced at fullback by Steve Watene for the second test which New Zealand lost 25-14, before also losing the third 20-18 with Norm Campbell at fullback with Watene moving to the wing.

Laing then returned to play for Devonport in their final round match of the Fox Memorial against City Rovers. They lost 19-13 but had already secured their 4th first grade title. He then played in their 19-18 loss to Marist Old Boys in the Roope Rooster semi final. On 9 September he travelled with the Devonport side to Pukekura Park in New Plymouth to play an exhibition match against a Ponsonby XIII. The match finished 28-28 with Laing kicking a conversion and two penalties. A week later he played in the Stormont Shield final against Marist Old Boys which Devonport lost 15-8 however he was injured early in the match and left the field, the injury ruled him out of the Devonport clash with Ponsonby for the Thistle Cup.

=== Devonport and Auckland ===
In 1933 Laing played 15 matches for Devonport and scored a try and kicked seven conversions. Devonport once again won the Fox Memorial title which was their 5th first grade title. Laing played in their final round match win over City Rovers 17-12 which sealed the title. He also played in their Stormont Shield final win over Richmond Rovers by 12 points to 7. The Auckland Rugby League had stated that the winner would earn the right to play the touring St. George side from Sydney who had finished runners-up in the 1933 New South Wales Rugby League season. Ultimately both teams ended up playing St. George. Devonport’s match was the first of the tour and they lost 19-8 with Laing kicking a conversion for Bert Leatherbarrow’s try.

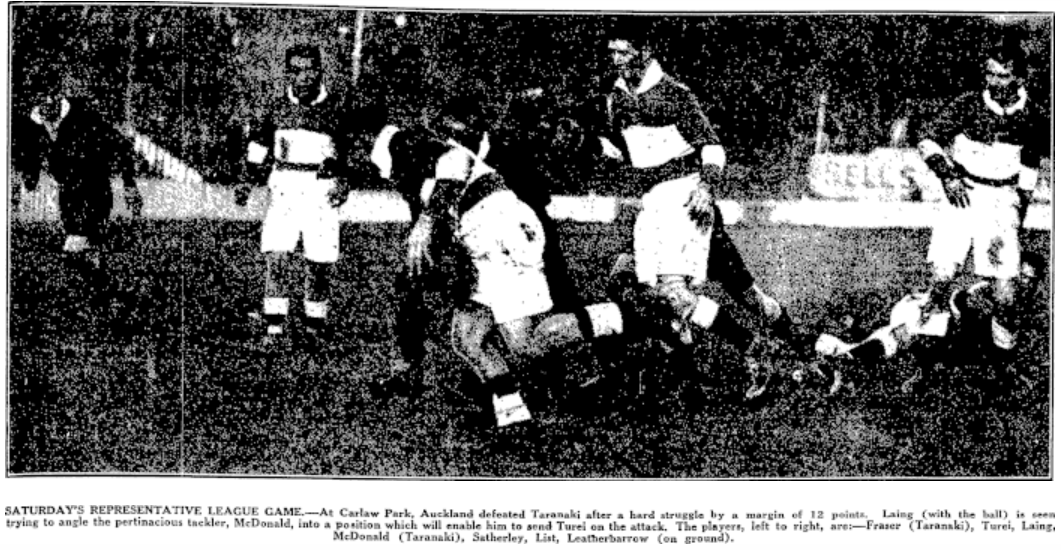

On 10 June Laing played for Auckland against South Auckland for the Northern Union Challenge Cup at Carlaw Park. Auckland lost 14-0 however it was said that Auckland would have lost by more if not for his defending. He played for Auckland again against Taranaki on 5 August at Western Park in New Plymouth. Auckland won 25-17 with Laing converting a try. His try came after he “made the extra man and then easily beat Lawrence to score the try”.

The 1934 season saw Laing take over the goal kicking duties at Devonport. In his 14 matches for them he kicked 11 conversions and 10 penalties. Devonport finished with a 5 win, 1 draw, 7 loss record. He was concussed in their round 3 match with Newton Rangers on 12 May and taken to Auckland Hospital in a St. John ambulance with his condition reported to have been “satisfactory” that night. Four days after the match he was reported as still being in hospital. He missed two matches but returned for the round 6 clash with City Rovers which was played on a public holiday. He kicked 3 conversions in a 18-15 win. At the end of the season on 15 September Laing travelled to Hikurangi in Northland to take on a Northland representative side. Devonport won 17-11 with Laing kicking 3 conversions and a penalty. Then on 2 October Laing played for a Ponsonby XIII against the touring Western Suburbs who had won the New South Wales premiership. Western Suburbs won the match 26-13 with Laing converting Brian Riley’s try. The start of the 1935 saw the New Zealand Herald report that Laing had moved out of Auckland. It is unclear where he moved to and it appears that he did not play rugby league again.

== Personal life and death ==
In June 1928 he was reported as living at 169, Victoria Road, Devonport. Albert Laing married Ida Elizabeth McNeil on 14 April 1936. They had 3 children; Brian, Graham, and Ngaire. Albert died on 18 January 1962 aged 53.
