= Norm Campbell (rugby league) =

New Zealand international rugby league player

Personal information
- Full name: Angus Norman Campbell
- Born: 30 March 1908 Auckland, New Zealand
- Died: 25 March 1985 (aged 76) Whakatāne, New Zealand

Playing information
- Weight: 11 st 7 lb (73 kg)

Rugby union
- Position: Fullback
Club
Years	Team	Pld	T	G	FG	P
1927	Otahuhu RFC	5	0	0	0	0
1940	Otahuhu RFC	1	0	0	0	0
	Total	6	0	0	0	0

Rugby league
- Position: Stand-off, Centre, Fullback
Club
Years	Team	Pld	T	G	FG	P
1928	Otahuhu Rovers	13
1929–36	Marist Old Boys	96	12	67	2	174
1931	Marist-Devonport	1	0	0	0	0
1938	Papakura	3	0	0	0	0
	Total	113	12	67	2	174
Representative
Years	Team	Pld	T	G	FG	P
1930–35	Auckland	11	0	23	1	48
1930	Auckland Trial	1	0	0	0	0
1931	North Island	1	0	0	0	0
1932	New Zealand	1	0	0	0	0

Norm Campbell was a rugby league player who represented New Zealand in one test match against England in 1932 at fullback. In the process he became the 224th player to represent New Zealand. He also played rugby league for Auckland, Marist Old Boys, Otahuhu Rovers, and Papakura as well as the Otahuhu RFC Rugby Football Club.

== Early life ==
Norm Campbell was born Angus Norman Campbell on March 30, 1908. His mother was Agnes Maud Campbell (1885–1951)but there was no father's name recorded on his birth registration. In 1909 Agnes married William Getty Campbell and they had a daughter named Emily Rose Campbell on 5 October 1909. William had applied for a separation order from Agnes in March of the same year on the grounds of desertion whilst living in Mount Roskill. In 1918 a divorce was granted after she claimed he had physically abused her in February 1909, and she left him and hadn't seen him since. They had three children together who were Norman's half siblings, Rona Marianne Lewis (1909–1966), William George Lewis (1911–1996), and Lex Arthur Lewis (1913–1980).

Norman appears to have spent his teenage years in Ōtāhuhu as in January 1927 he was mentioned as having won the 75 yard swim race at the Otahuhu Football Club's annual aquatic carnival. Later in the same year he was listed as playing for the Otahuhu club's third grade team.

== Playing career ==
=== Rugby for Otahuhu RFC ===
In 1926 and 1927 Campbell was playing in the Otahuhu junior grades but he was first listed at fullback in their senior side for a July 2 match against Marist. He played about 5 matches for them over the remainder of the 1927 season.

=== Rugby league switch to Otahuhu Rovers in 1928 ===
He began the 1928 season having switched to rugby league and was named to play fullback for the Otahuhu senior side in the Auckland Rugby League B division (Norton Cup). After their round 2 match against Point Chevalier it was said “Campbell, full-back for Otahuhu, gave a sterling display and he stood out as the best back on the ground. His fielding was certain and his kicking powerful and well directed. It was a treat to see the Otahuhu custodian open up the play for his three-quarters”. Following a game against Grafton Athletic on June 23 at the Auckland Domain it was reported that he “made few mistakes at full-back, and he made some good saves earlier in the game”. He was then also mentioned as a possible representative player to come out of the Senior B competition. He finished the season having played in 13 matches but it is not known if he scored any points as the individual point scoring was rarely reported in the B Division (Norton Cup).

=== Move to Marist Old Boys ===
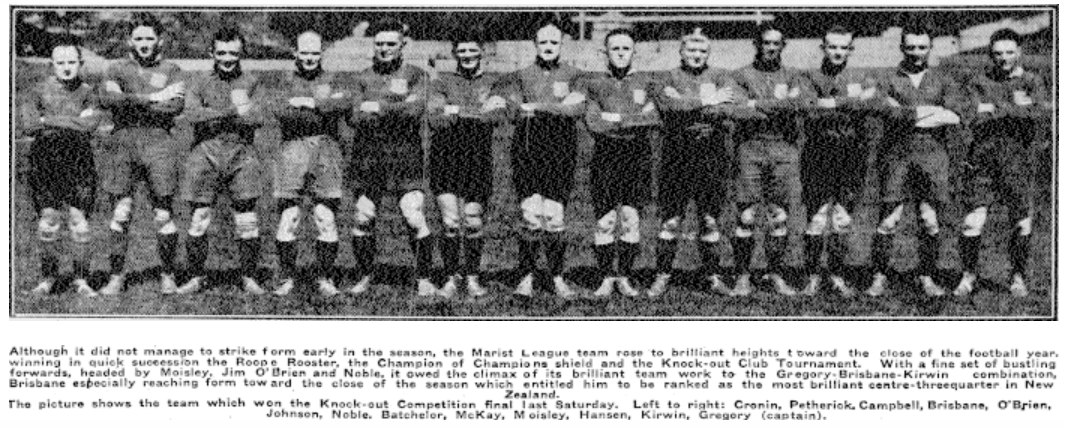
Campbell, 3rd from left in the knockout final winning team.

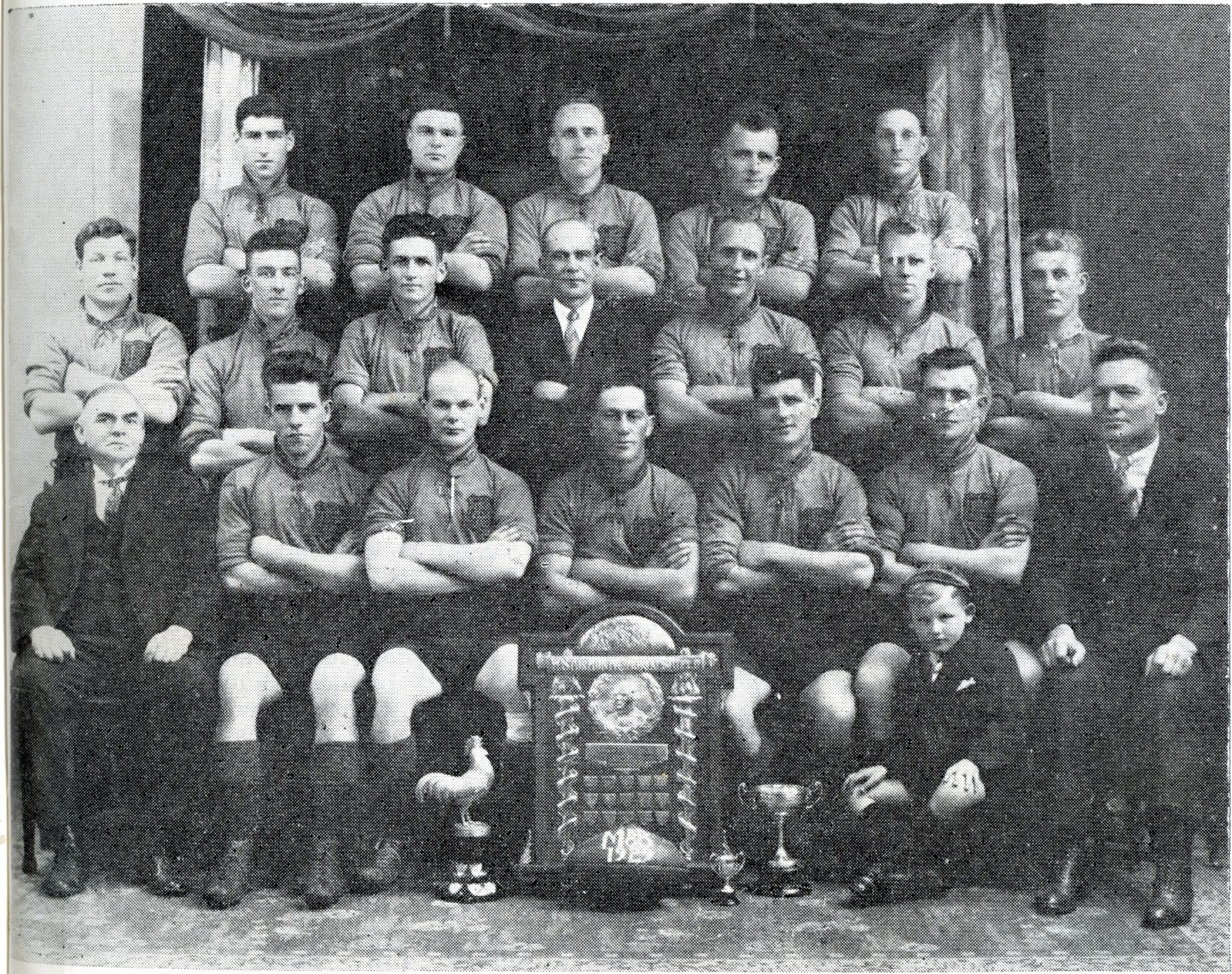
The Marist team in 1929 with Norm Campbell in the back row on the left.

At the start of the 1929 season Campbell moved to the Marist Old Boys who were in the first grade (Monteith Shield). He debuted in a preseason game against City Rovers and kicked a conversion in a 5–0 win. He was said to have given “a sound display”. His transfer from Otahuhu Rovers was approved of by the Auckland Rugby League on May 1. Following a match against City Rovers on July 20 the New Zealand Herald reported that “Campbell, at fullback, gave a brilliant display. He fielded surely and placed his kicks with good judgment…[his] display equalled the best seen at headquarters [Carlaw Park] this season”. He had obviously impressed the Auckland selectors (Edwin V. Fox, Ernie Asher, and Bert Avery) as he was named 2 weeks later in the Auckland training squad to play Canterbury. He was then listed as an emergency back but was not required to play. On September 21 he played in Marist's Roope Rooster final win against Ponsonby United. Then a week later he scored a try in their Stormont Shield victory over the same opponent before a crowd of 9,000 at Carlaw Park. And he then finished the season playing for Marist in two matches against the touring South Sydney side. Marist won the first match 10–9 before losing the season 21–5. He ultimately played 21 matches for Marist over the course of his first season with them, scoring 2 tries and kicking 9 goals.

=== Debut for Auckland ===
The 1930 season saw Campbell only play 9 games after he was injured in a July 5 match against Kingsland Athletic. It was thought that he would miss “several weeks” and he ultimately didn't return until their final match of the season which was a benefit match between Marist and Otahuhu for W. McManus. Earlier in the season he had been in good form and he was chosen to play for Auckland against Northland. There were 8,000 spectators on hand to see Auckland win 21–16 with Campbell converting Maurice Wetherill's first half try. He was reported to have “made good in the full-back position, and, in addition to usually kicking with judgment, showed enterprise in racing his backs into position”. He would have likely played for Auckland in their match with South Auckland (Waikato) but was unavailable. On June 4 he played for a Possibles side against Probables which was a trial to help select the New Zealand team to tour Australia. It was a curtain-raiser to the annual North Island v South Island match. His Possibles side was beaten soundly by 38 points to 3.

=== North Island selection ===
1931 saw Campbell play 17 games for Marist, scoring 3 tries. He was part of their side which sealed the first grade title in the last round when they beat Devonport United who they had been tied with going into the match. Marist won 12–5. Following the match Campbell was selected by Thomas McClymont to play in the North Island side against the South Island. Notably there were a remarkable seven other Marist players named in the North Island side. The Auckland Star suggested that he along with other “newcomers” had “justified their inclusion by their consistency throughout the season”. And that he “has earned his place as North full-back. He kicks strongly and with judgment, when necessary, runs his backs into position, and is strong defensively. The New Zealand Herald gave a more confusing comment saying that as “custodian [he] is perhaps the best fullback seen out this season, his displays being more consistent than those of Simons and Watene, who are more impressive when in form. Campbell has scarcely shown form worthy of representative standards and a choice from other backs for the position would not have surprised”. The match was played on Carlaw Park on August 15 with North Island winning easily 52 to 23.

On September 26 Campbell was part of the Auckland side which drew with Northland 19-19. On October 3 Marist lost to Devonport 25–6 with Campbell at fullback and then 2 weeks later he was part of a combined Marist-Devonport side which played the touring Eastern Suburbs side. The combined team won the match 14–13 at Carlaw Park before a huge crowd of 15,000. Campbell “did fairly well at full-back, but has shown to better advantage”.

=== New Zealand selection v England ===
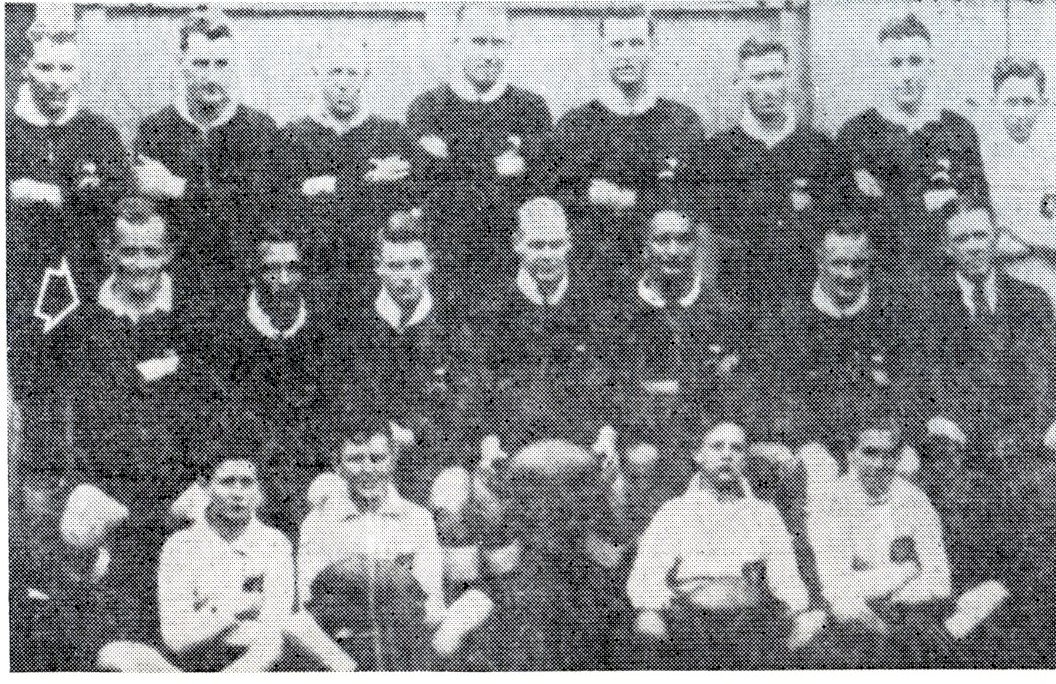
1932 New Zealand 3rd test Team. Norm Campbell is in the back row, second (player) from the right.

Campbell played nine times for Marist to start the 1932 season before being selected for an Auckland XIII to play South Auckland XIII. He had been injured in a game against Richmond Rovers on June 11 when he received a kick to the hip and was forced from the field. It was reported that he hadn't been well heading into the match. He did not miss any matches however and played in Auckland's 29–13 win over South Auckland on July 16. It was said that Campbell “played a good game at fullback…, but he has been passed over for Laing” for selection in the North Island side. He was however selected to play in the Probables side to play in the curtain-raiser though he must have pulled out as he was not included in the final playing side. Campbell was then chosen in the Auckland training squad to prepare for their match with the touring England side. He was then picked in the side to take on England with the Auckland Star reporting that “the Marist full-back, Campbell, who played such sterling football against South Auckland, may be relied upon as the last-liner for Saturday. It is not generally known that like Cooke, he started as a centre. His ability to defend, as well as link up in the chain, should be tested”. Campbell played at fullback for Auckland against England on August 6 at Carlaw Park before 15,000 spectators. Auckland pushed the tourists but lost 19–14 with Campbell kicking a drop goal.

A week later he turned out for Marist in a match against Newton Rangers and then was picked for New Zealand for the third test against England. The New Zealand selectors had played Albert Laing at fullback in the first test which New Zealand lost 24–9 before trying Steve Watene there in the second which New Zealand again lost 25–14. Watene was being moved onto the wing and Ben Davidson being omitted which opened up the full back position.

New Zealand pushed England hard but ultimately lost 20–18. In the Auckland Star's match report they said that early in the match “List, Brimble and N. Campbell … featured in some great tackling”. With the score 8–5 in favour of New Zealand Barney Hudson was put in the clear before passing to Artie Atkinson but “Campbell stopped him and temporarily left the field. The ball rolled forward, but play was allowed to proceed, with the result that [Alec] Fildes was on the scene to dribble over and score a doubtful try”. The Herald described it as a “splendid tackle” and that Campbell was forced to retire after the “collision” with Watene moving to fullback however Campbell was able to take his place back at fullback at the start of the second half.

Campbell finished the season playing in the Marist side in a Roope Rooster semi-final win over Devonport United, before they then defeated City Rovers in the final 28–8. He scored a try in the semi-final win, and a try and a conversion in the final. They then played Devonport in the Stormont Shield final on September 17 and round the season off with another trophy, winning 15–8.

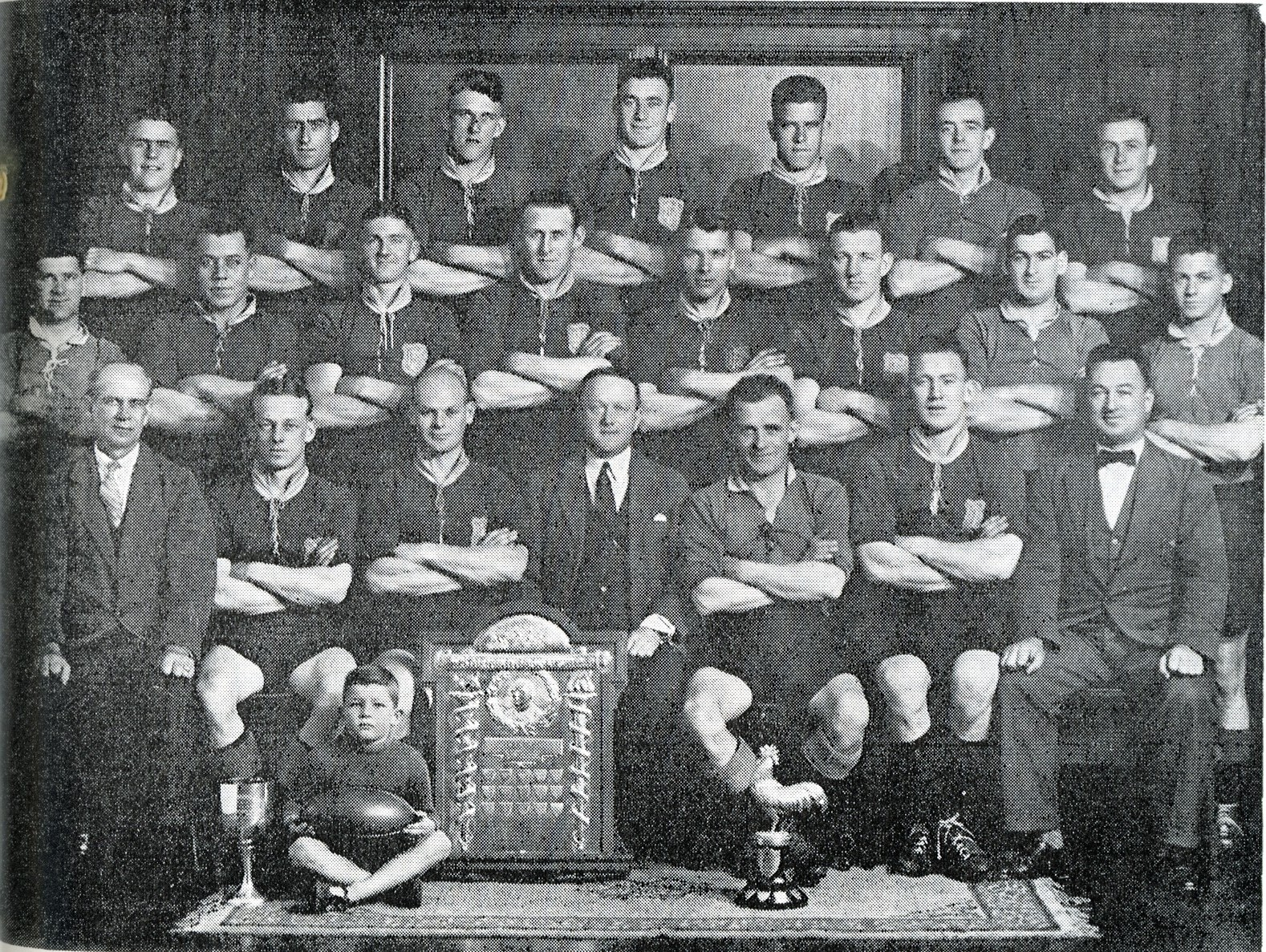
Marist in 1932 with Norm Campbell in the back row, second from the left.

=== Marist and Auckland ===
Campbell took on more of the goal kicking responsibilities for Marist after round 5 of the Fox Memorial in 1933 and kicked 17 conversions and 4 penalties to go with 2 tries in 15 appearances for them. He was selected for the Auckland side to play Northland on August 12 and kicked 5 conversions in a 28–13 win. Two weeks later he was part of the Auckland side which beat West Coast 28-22 where he again converted 5 tries. The following weekend he kicked 4 conversions in a 47-17 Auckland win over Hawke's Bay. His final appearance for Auckland that season was against South Auckland (Waikato) and saw Auckland win against their neighbours by 17 points to 5 with Campbell converting a try by Roy Bright.

Following the representative season Campbell played 4 more matches for Marist. One of these was against the touring St. George side. Marist won the match convincingly by 25 points to 11 with Campbell kicking 3 conversions and 2 penalties. The match was played on September 30 at Carlaw Park before a crowd on 13,000. he then played in a Max Jaffe Cup match against Richmond Rovers. As both teams had beaten St. George the match was to decide the ‘best club team in Auckland’ and saw Richmond run out easy 31–8 winners with Campbell kicking 1 conversion. They then played the same opponent on October 21 in a match to raise money for the unemployed. Marist won 16 to 5 with Campbell scoring 2 relatively rare tries.

The 1934 season saw Campbell playing 17 games for Marist, converting 17 tries along with kicking 9 penalties. Marist had a disappointing season finishing last in the Fox Memorial competition. They did make the final of the Roope Rooster knockout competition but lost to Richmond 20–13. Campbell kicked 2 conversions in the loss. Marist's final match of the season was against the Western Suburbs side who had won the New South Wales RFL championship on September 22 and Marist went down narrowly 21–19 with Campbell converting 2 tries.

Campbell's only two representative appearances of the season were for Auckland against Taranaki on June 30 and South Auckland on September 15. Auckland beat Taranaki 35–8 with Campbell converting just 1 try as he was sharing goal kicking duty with Cliff Satherley. Auckland also defeated South Auckland by 35 to 16 with Campbell kicking 4 conversions.

The 1935 season saw Campbell start the year off in good goal kicking form with 10 goals kicked through the first 4 games of the Fox Memorial for Marist. Though he then missed 5 matches due to a “dental overhaul” which involved a lengthy recovery. It was reported on June 26 that “N. Campbell, the well-known Marist full-back, has been greatly missed by his team. Followers of the code will be pleased to hear that he is fast regaining his health”. After returning to play on July 6 against City Rovers he was said to have played very well in a 20–7 win which saw him kick 3 conversions and a penalty. He played 3 more Fox Memorial matches before he was selected for Auckland to play Taranaki on August 3. He kicked 2 conversions in a 37–14 win at Carlaw Park. Campbell was selected to play for Auckland against Australia on September 21 but was unavailable to play and his place at fullback was taken by Bert Cooke.

=== Retirement and joining Papakura ===
It was reported at the start of the 1936 season that Campbell was going to play once more. He turned out for them on May 2 against City Rovers but did not play the following week and made no further appearances for Marist. In 1937 Campbell did not play at all but then came out of retirement in 1938 to join the Papakura club. In their round 2 match the newly promoted side lost to City Rovers 23-18 but Campbell was said to have “played well at fullback and his fielding and excellent kicking often saved Papakura. On April 13 it was reported that his transfer from Marist to Papakura had gone through and that he was a “player coach”. He played in 3 more matches for the Papakura side but there was no further mention of him for the remainder of the season in any capacity.

=== Return to Otahuhu rugby ===
There was no record of Campbell playing in 1939 but then early in the 1940 season it was reported that he had rejoined the rugby code and his old Otahuhu side. In late May the Auckland Star reported that the “New Zealand Rugby Union notified the reinstatement of A. N. Campbell”. He played in a match against Grammar on June 15. The Auckland Star said “N. Campbell, who has not played for a few seasons since his break with Marist league team, gave a very impressive display at full-back until he received an injury and had to retire at half-time”. There was no record of him playing for them over the rest of the season. He did however play in a charity match for them in June, 1941 to raise money for the All Otahuhu Patriotic Fund. He was chosen in the Past club players squad which would be playing the Present players. Then in August he was picked in the back reserves for an ex-player rugby league match between the All Golds and South Auckland.

== Personal life and death ==
Campbell married Freda Evelyn Woods in 1929. They lived in Auckland in the 1940s and resided in Otahuhu in the 1950s according to electoral records. Norm and Freda had two children, Betty Jean Campbell (1943–2007), and Roy Taylor Campbell. Roy died in his childhood on November 5, 1938. Norm died on March 25, 1985, at Sheafs Resthome in Whakatane aged 75. His ashes were taken to FD in Whakatane.
