= 1932 Auckland Rugby League season =

The 1932 season was the 24th season of the Auckland Rugby League.

Devonport United won the Senior grade with a 7 win, 2 draw, and 1 loss record ahead of Marist Old Boys and Ponsonby United. They were the dominant team and their only loss came in the final round when they had already secured their second title first having won it in 1928. Marist Old Boys stuffed their trophy cabinet when they won the Roope Rooster (defeating City Rovers 28–8), Stormont Shield (defeating Devonport United 15–8), and Max Jaffe Cup for finishing runner up in the Senior Championship (they beat Ponsonby United in a playoff after both teams tied for second by 37 to 8). City Rovers won the Thistle Cup after beating Devonport in the final by 22 to 19 after both teams finished with 8 competitions points in the second round thus forcing a playoff for the Cup. Richmond won the Davis Shield after their lower grade teams combined for the most competition points in Auckland. This was remarkably their 10th win in the Shields 12-year history.

In the reserve grade Richmond Reserves won with an 8 win, 2 loss record, with Ponsonby Reserves finishing runner up. The Marist Old Boys club added yet another trophy to their season haul with their reserve grade team winning the Stallard Cup (awarded to the reserve grade knockout winners) when they beat Devonport Reserves by 12–6 in the final.

The representative program was marked by a match between Auckland and the touring England team. In a very competitive match Auckland went down by 14 to 19. Aside from this fixture Auckland only played matches against South Auckland where they won 29 to 13, and Lower Waikato in Huntly where they won 35–8. There were a series of trial matches such as North Island v South Island and Probables v Possibles matches dominated by Auckland players.

Preceded by 1931	24th Auckland Rugby League season 1932	Succeeded by 1933

== Season News ==
=== Club teams by grade participation ===
Team	Fox Memorial	Reserves	2nd	3rd Open	3rd Int.	4th	5th	6th	7th	Schools	Total
Richmond Rovers	1	1	0	1	1	1	1	2	2	1	11
Marist Old Boys	1	1	0	1	1	1	2	0	0	0	7
Devonport United	1	1	1	0	1	0	1	0	1	1	7
City Rovers	1	1	0	0	1	0	1	1	0	1	6
Ponsonby United	1	1	1	1	0	1	0	0	0	0	5
Newton Rangers	1	1	0	0	0	1	1	0	0	1	5
Northcote & Birkenhead Ramblers	0	0	1	0	1	0	2	0	0	1	5
Point Chevalier	0	0	1	0	0	1	1	1	0	0	4
Akarana	0	0	0	1	1	1	1	0	0	0	4
Ellerslie United	0	0	1	0	0	0	1	0	1	1	4
Mount Albert United	0	0	1	1	1	0	0	0	0	0	3
Papakura	0	0	1	1	0	1	0	0	0	0	3
Māngere United	0	0	1	0	0	0	0	1	1	0	3
Otahuhu Rovers	0	0	1	0	0	1	0	0	0	1	3
Papatoetoe	0	0	0	0	0	0	1	0	0	1	2
Glenora	0	0	0	1	0	0	0	0	0	0	1
Avondale Schools	0	0	0	0	0	0	0	0	0	1	1
Total	6	6	9	7	7	8	12	5	5	9	74

=== Annual general meeting ===
At the annual general meeting of the Auckland Rugby League on 11 April, Mr. E.J. Phelan presided as acting president due to Mr. James Carlaw's absence. The plan put in place at the beginning of the 1931 season of having each club electing two members to represent them on the management committee and clubs taking a percentage of the gate receipts was considered a success. The election of officers took place and the results were: Patron: Hon. J.B. Donald (re-elected), President: Mr. James Carlaw (re-elected), Vice-presidents: Mr. George McMillan, Mr. O. Blackwood, Mr. S.H. Grange, Mr. W. Wallace, Mr. Gordon Seagar, Mr. Richard (Dick) Benson, Mr. C.H. Drysdale, Mr. E.J. Phelan, Mr. A.E. Laird, Mr. John A. Lee, Mr. R.H. Woods, Mr. R.T. Sharman (all re-elected), and Mr. W.J. Meilklejohn, Mr. G. Gray Campbell, Mr. J.W. Dixon, and Mr. C. Faulkner.

=== Manukau Rugby League Club reborn, club name changes and competition restructuring ===
Prior to the season commencing the Mount Wellington club requested permission to change its name to Otahuhu Rovers and this was approved by the league. Their chairman Mr. L.W. Arnold said that the reorganised club was in good hands and they would enter teams in the second, fourth, and school teams grades. Their colours would be royal blue.

It was decided that the Ellerslie-Otahuhu club would revert to the name of Ellerslie United, and that senior players would be able to transfer to any other club, but juniors would need to obtain transfer clearance from Ellerslie.

At a meeting the following night the league decided to cut the teams in the first grade from seven to six with Ellerslie (or rather the combined Ellerslie-Otahuhu United team of 1931) being culled from the grade. The teams which would remain were Marist Old Boys, Devonport United, Ponsonby United, City Rovers, Newton Rangers, Richmond Rovers. The New Zealand Herald previewed the 6 teams in the week leading up to the first round of matches. It was initially decided to play two senior matches at Carlaw Park with the reserve teams playing the curtain raisers. However, for Round 2 it was decided to play all three senior matches at Carlaw Park and reserve grade games elsewhere. This was a decision which clubs fought over as they wanted their reserve teams playing prior to the Senior A teams in case of needing players. This came to a fore after Round 5 when City Rovers arrived at Devonport, New Zealand 4 players short. Fortunately for them the reserve grade match was being played at the same venue at 1:30pm and so they were able to use those players to avoid defaulting.

In mid September plans began to manifest for the formation of a Manukau Rugby League Club. The plans were reported to an Auckland Rugby League Management Committee meeting. It was stated that there was a good deal of playing talent in the Manukau district. Mr. J. Rukutai was deputed to investigate the matter. On Thursday, 29 September they placed an ad for intending players and supporters to be held at the Strand Theatre Buildings, Onehunga. At this meeting the club was officially formed with Mr. H. Kemp convening the meeting. There were 52 people present including W. Mincham, referee of the RL Association, and Mr. T. Davis, secretary of the junior control board. Mr. J Rukutai said that the proposed club had been discussed by the league and they would give it every consideration. A resolution to form the club and have its headquarters in Onehunga was adopted. Mr W. Hayward was elected chairman, with the patron being Mr. W. J. Jordan, M.P., and the president Mr. E. Martin, Mayor of Onehunga. Financial assistance has also been promised by several local businessmen. A committee was formed to further the development of the club during the off season. The newly formed club asked that an exhibition match be played in Onehunga so that the club could gain some funds. Permission was granted for the match between second grade knockout final between Mangere and Mount Albert to be played at the Onehunga Recreation Reserve. The match was won by Mangere by 18 points to 15.

=== Financial statement, player passes and ground fees ===
The financial statement said that the revenue from the 1931 season totalled £2,907 with £2,293 coming from gate receipts and £228 from ground rents. Spending had amounted to £2,066 meaning a net surplus of £813. Of this £472 was given to Auckland clubs, £68 to the Referees’ Association and the Junior Management Committee, £30 in grants to visiting teams, £195 in honorariums, and £66 in presentations and trophies. Carlaw Park was valued as an asset at £10,152. At a meeting of the Auckland Rugby League Board of Control on 17 March it was decided to continue with giving teams a percentage of the gate takings as had been started in 1931.

The League made a decision on an issue that had caused problems for several years, which was the abuse of players passes to gain entry to Carlaw Park on match days. Club secretaries would now have to supply the names of senior team players and that they would be checked in a side gate by a special official.

It was decided to admit military patients from Auckland Hospital into Carlaw Park to watch Senior matches free of charge news. The Patients’ Welfare Committee gratefully acknowledged the league for the move.

The Auckland Rugby League, Auckland Rugby Union, and Auckland Football Association had asked the city council if they could reduce their ground fees owing to the number of unemployed players. The city council decided to reduce charges despite their Parks Committee suggesting otherwise. Mr. E.J. Phelan moved to reduce fees from 5s to 3s for games played from 12:30pm to 1:45pm, from 10s to 7s/6d for games played from 1:45pm to 3pm, and from 15s to 12s/6d for games played from 3pm onwards. This motion was passed by a show of hands.

=== Radio broadcast of Carlaw Park games ===
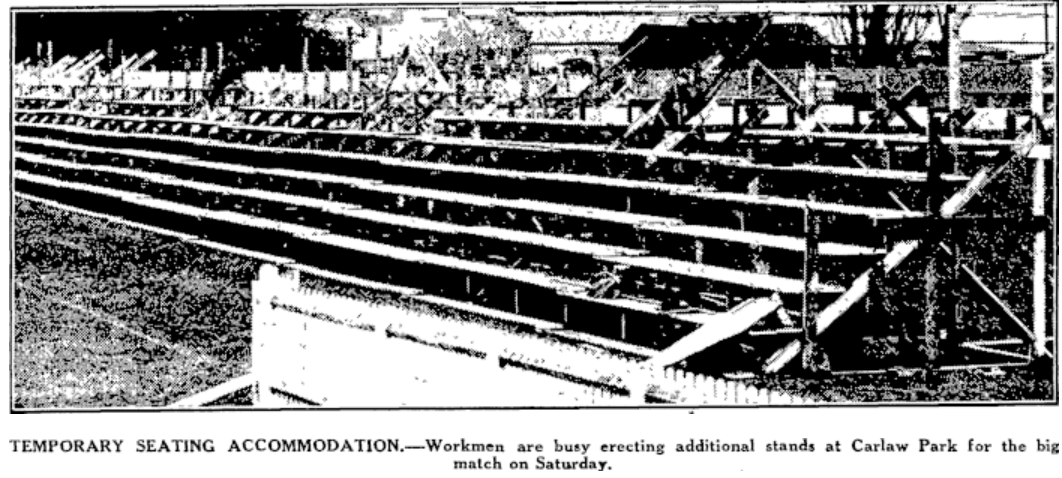

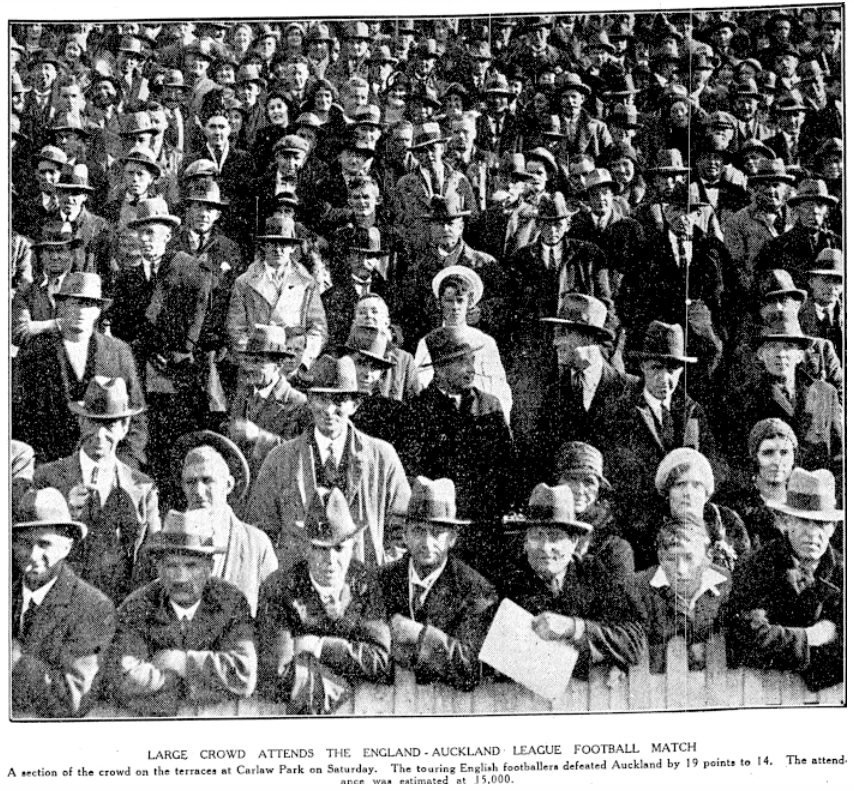

For the first ever time commentary of a game at Carlaw Park was broadcast. The 1ZQ station broadcast coverage of the Ponsonby v Devonport game in Round 1. A temporary stand was also built to accommodate extra spectators for the England tour matches.

=== Rule issues ===
At the Auckland Rugby League Referees’ Association meeting on 16 May the City Club inquired about the play the ball rule. It was said that the rule was not being enforced properly regarding the forwards needing to be inside a 5-yard radius behind their halfback when the ball was being played. The New Zealand Council also wished for it to be known that the attacking side had the loose head at scrums but the defending team were to put the ball in. In addition hookers were not to go on their knees in scrums in order to get an advantage when raking the ball back.

=== Bert Cooke switches codes ===
In the middle of the season the famous All Black Bert Cooke (rugby) switched codes when he moved back to Auckland. He signed with the Richmond Rovers. The move proved very successful, so much so that he was selected for the North Island team in a trial match against the South Island only weeks after switching codes. He scored three tries and was selected for the New Zealand team to play England.

=== Obituaries ===
==== D.W. McLean ====
On 1 March Mr. D. W. McLean suffered a heart attack and died at a meeting of the North Shore Rowing Club where he was president. He was the first New Zealand president of rugby league in Auckland. He, along with Mr. William Wynyard and others was one of the founders of rugby league in New Zealand.

==== William Wynyard ====
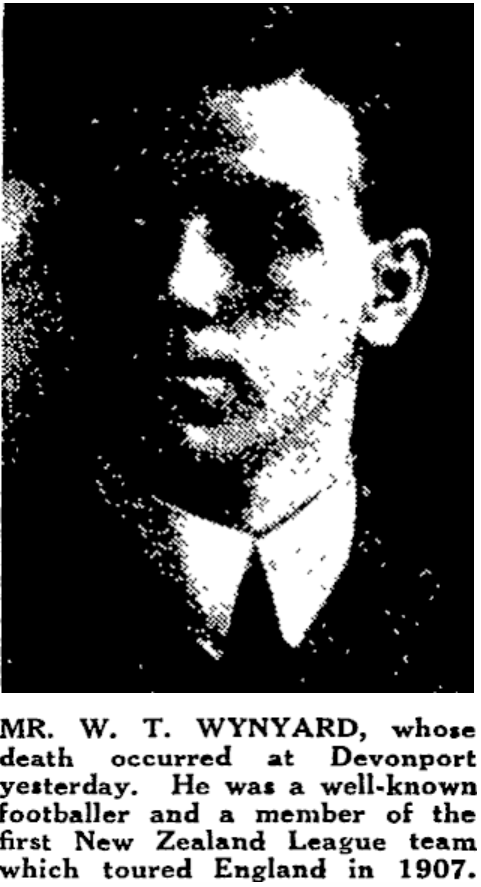

In August William Thomas Wynyard, aged 49 died. He was from a sporting family with three uncles who were part of the 1888–89 New Zealand Native football team that went on a rugby union tour of Great Britain. William played rugby union for North Shore and was an Auckland trialist before switching codes. He was a member of the New Zealand team which toured England in 1907–08 playing in 15 matches and scoring 4 tries. He was then part of the inaugural Auckland rugby league competition in 1909 playing intermittently for North Shore Albions from 1909 to 1913, and representing Auckland in 5 matches from 1908 to 1910. He retired in 1913 but remained involved in the game for many years after.

==== Harry Johns ====
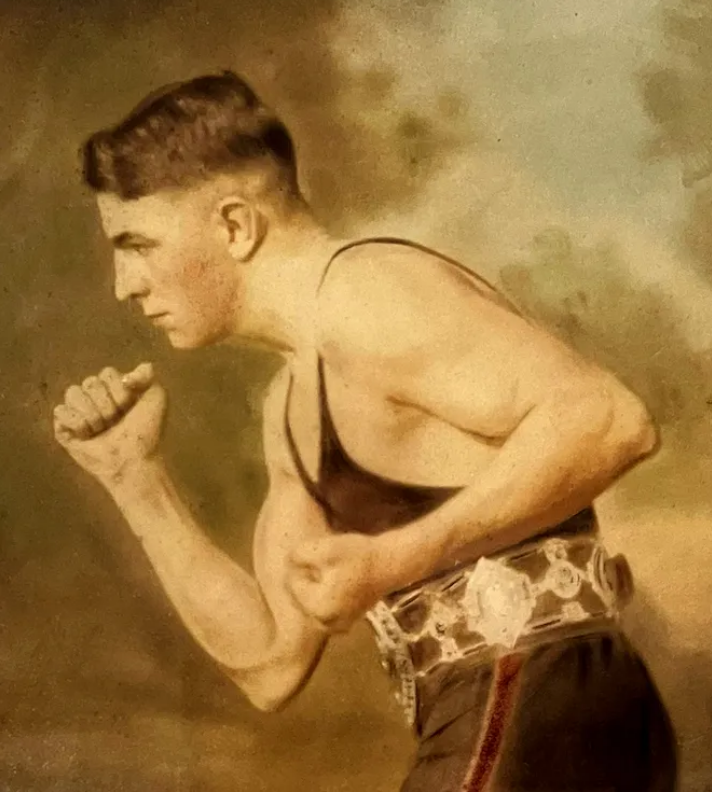

On the morning of 4 October the Richmond senior player Harry Johns died aged 21 after a boxing match at the Auckland Town Hall the previous evening. He was knocked out in the 14th round of a 15-round fight by Archie Hughes of New South Wales. Johns was the NZABA Featherweight Titleholder in 1929 and was awarded the Jameson Belt in the same year. He became the NZ Professional Lightweight Champion on January 26, 1931 and held the title until October 3, 1932 and had a ring record of 12 fights, 7 wins – 4 losses – 1 draw. Johns had played junior football for Richmond since the age of 13 where he was a halfback. He had been in the seventh grade team which had won the championship and he repeated this feat in the following two years. In 1931 he was in the Third Intermediate grade which won the grade and he was promoted to the reserve grade team in 1932. His form was so good that he was promoted to the senior side and made the Probables versus Possibles match which played at Carlaw Park on 23 July. He was regarded as a certainty to gain higher honours in the future. Johns was originally from the West Coast of the South Island and was the oldest in a family of four. Several articles were published in The New Zealand Herald and the Auckland Star newspapers on his life and death. It was later reported that he had sustained a concussion in the Probables v Possibles match and bled from the nose along with requiring stitches in his head. He fought in Hastings shortly afterwards and lost. Johns then complained of feeling unwell and produced a medical certificate that he was not fit to fight. However he carried on playing league in the interim until beginning training for the fatal bout. It was said that those who knew him well could tell that he was not his usual self in the fight. He was laid to rest on 5 October at Waikumete Cemetery following an enormous gathering at the service with boxers and footballers walking before the cortege. Over 70 motor cars tailed the hearse and the entire procession was a mile long. The casket was draped in Richmond colours of blue and maroon. After his death a boxing belt was named in his honour as was a Richmond club trophy.

== Fox Memorial Shield (senior grade championship) ==
=== Fox Memorial standings ===
Team	Pld	W	D	L	F	A	Pts
Devonport United	10	7	2	1	130	104	16
Marist Old Boys	10	5	2	3	129	105	12
Ponsonby United	10	6	0	4	159	158	12
City Rovers	10	3	2	5	134	164	8
Richmond Rovers	10	3	0	7	117	134	6
Newton Rangers	10	2	2	6	104	108	6

=== Fox Memorial fixtures ===
==== Round 1 ====
Dick Smith (Devonport)

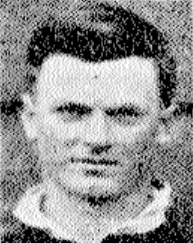
Trevor Hall (Newton)

The round one games were played in heavy rain. For Devonport their second five eighth Dick Smith scored a try and kicked three conversions in their 18-10 win over Ponsonby. Newton caused an upset win over City after Laurie Barchard and later Ben Davidson left the field injured. Davidson received a "nasty mouth injury which required hospital attention". Trevor Hall who had been playing for St. Helens in England for the past three seasons had returned to his Newton club and played in the second row. Their five eighth Arnold Porteous scored two tries while fullback Claude Dempsey converted three of their four tries. Richmond beat Marist at the Auckland Domain 5 points to 0 with Ray Lawless, the promising Richmond forward scoring the only try of the match. It was converted by a young rugby recruit named Ellis.

30 April	Devonport	18–10	Ponsonby	Carlaw Park 1
3:00	Try: Alf Smith, Ted Scott, Dick Smith, Ernest Ruby; Con: Dick Smith 3		Try: Roy Bright, Pat Skelton; Con: Pat Skelton; Pen: Pat Skelton	Referee: Vic Simpson

30 April	Richmond	5–0	Marist	Carlaw Park 2
3:00	Try: Ray Lawless; Con: Ellis			Referee: Percy Rogers

30 April	Newton	18–5	City	Auckland Domain 2
3:00	Try: Arnold Porteous 2, Ted Brimble, Charles Allan; Con: Claude Dempsey 3		Try: James Herring; Con: Francis Herring	Referee: John Stormont

==== Round 2 ====
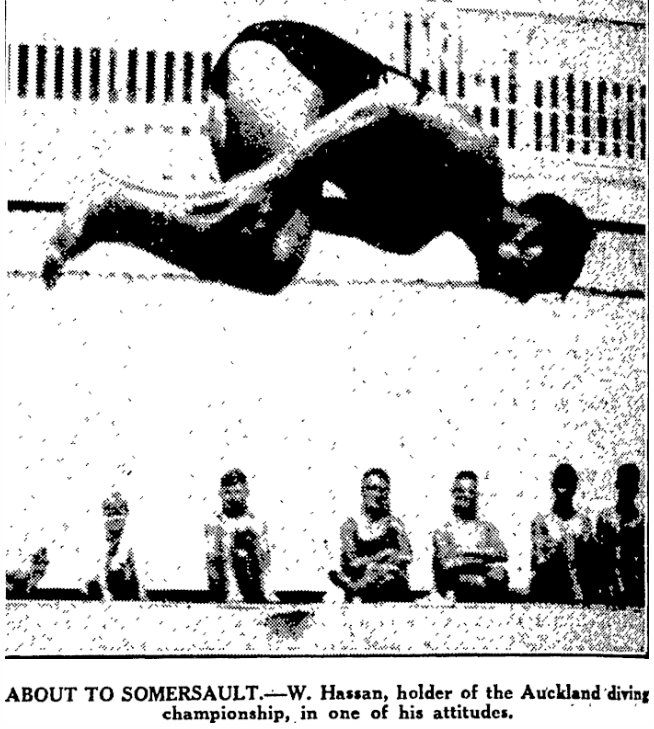
Wilf Hassan, Marist halfback and New Zealand diving champion in 1934 and 1935.

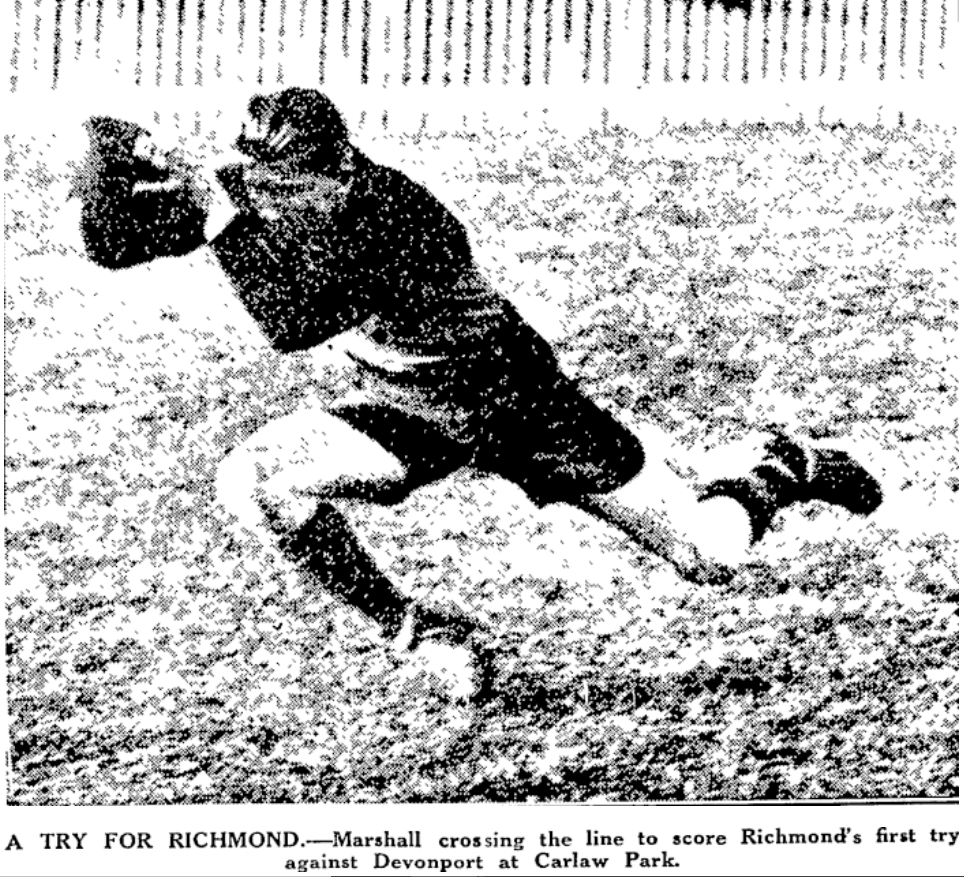
Reece Marshall scoring for Richmond against Devonport in their 14-9 loss at Carlaw Park.

Wilf Hassan made his first appearance for Marist after moving to Cambridge and it being reported that he might only be available irregularly. Hassan would go on to become the New Zealand diving champion in 1934 and 1935. All Round 2 Senior matches were originally postponed due to heavy rain on the Saturday morning of 7 May. Horace Hunt, the former Auckland cricket representative wicket keeper scored for Devonport in their 14-9 win over Richmond. Frank Delgrosso's penalty proved the difference in Ponsonby's win over Newton after Lou Hutt had scored a try for them also. Delgrosso was in his 14th season for the Ponsonby seniors.

14 May	Devonport	14–9	Richmond	Carlaw Park 1
3:00	Try: Horace Hunt, C Rhodes; Con: Dick Smith 2 Pen: Dick Smith; Drop: Allan Seagar		Try: Reece Marshall; Con: Ellis; Pen: Ellis 2	Referee: Les Bull

14 May	Marist	12–2	City	Carlaw Park 1
3:00	Try: Herb Carter 2 Con: Alan Clarke 2 Pen: Alan Clarke		Pen: Ralph Longville	Referee: E McCall

14 May	Ponsonby	8–6	Newton	Carlaw Park 2
3:00	Try: A McIntyre, Lou Hutt; Pen: Frank Delgrosso		Try: Trevor Hall, Ray Middleton	Referee: Bertie Emirali

==== Round 3 ====
Following the match between Marist and Ponsonby there was a protest by the Ponsonby club asking for a replay. Near the end of the game with Ponsonby leading an offside player (Alan Clarke) from a kick recovered the ball without Frank Delgrosso, the Ponsonby fullback touching the ball. The player then ran in a try untouched and Marist went on to add to their score. The incident saw the referee jeered by the spectators for some time. The Auckland Rugby League were not interested in a replay as it was a matter of a possible refereeing error rather than an incorrect rule interpretation. Harry Johns debuted for Richmond seniors at centre after the departure of Ellis who had played there in the opening two rounds. Johns was said to have been arguably the best back on the field running deceptively.

21 May	Marist	23–12	Ponsonby	Carlaw Park 1
3:00	Try: Claude List 2, Alan Clarke, Robert Carter, Pat Meehan; Con: Alan Clarke 4		Try: George Mills 2 Con: Frank Delgrosso; Pen: Frank Delgrosso 2	Referee: Frank Thompson

21 May	Richmond	16–6	City	Carlaw Park 2
3:00	Try: Reece Marshall, Stan Prentice, C Reynolds 2 Con: W Jones 2		Try: Ben Davidson, Stan Clark	Referee: Vic Simpson

21 May	Devonport	8–8	Newton	Carlaw Park 1
1:30	Try: Jack Hawkes, Leslie Oliff; Pen: Dick Smith		Try: Cameron, Ted Brimble; Con: Claude Dempsey	Referee: A.E. Chapman

==== Round 4 ====
Newton's win over Richmond was a milestone in the club's history with it being their 100th first grade win. To this point they had played in 23 seasons. By the season end their all-time first grade record stood at 100-11-133. Hec Brisbane received a bad back injury in Marist's draw with Devonport and was unable to play for several weeks.

28 May	Marist	11–11	Devonport	Carlaw Park 1
3:00	Try: Pat Meehan 2, Phil Brady; Con: Alan Clarke		Try: Allan Seagar, Alf Smith, J Harding; Pen: Allan Seagar	Referee: Percy Rogers

28 May	Newton	15–13	Richmond	Carlaw Park 2
3:00	Try: Ted Brimble, Arnold Porteous, Ray Middleton; Con: Arnold Porteous; Pen: Claude Dempsey 2		Try: Stan Prentice 2, Reece Marshall; Pen: Valentine 2	Referee: Bertie Emirali

28 May	Ponsonby	30–13	City	Carlaw Park 1
1:30	Try: Leonard Riley 3, A McIntyre 3, Heck Lunn 2 Con: Frank Delgrosso 2 Drop: George Mills		Try: Horatio Drew, Pierce 2 Con: Tim Peckham, A Hickey	Referee: Les Bull

==== Round 5 ====
For Marist it was reported that Wilf Hassan was injured "five times" and was eventually helped from the field early in the second half. Around the same time Trevor Hall also left the field for Newton after having played an outstanding game to that point. Marist was without Hec Brisbane who was injured and Phil Brady took his place. Marist forward Jim Johnson, who had played for the Marist seniors from 1922 to 1931 made his first appearance of the season. The City team travelled to Devonport minus the services of backs Ben Davidson (centre), Tim Peckham (halfback), Horatio Drew (winger) and Ralph Longville (fullback). It was the 15th time the teams had met on that ground with Devonport now having a five win, three draw, seven loss record against City at their home venue. Longville was replaced by Puti Tipene (Steve) Watene who kicked four goals for them. For Ponsonby, veteran fullback Frank Delgrosso was brilliant at fullback and also kicked three conversions and two penalties in their 25-22 win over Richmond. It was feared after Stan Prentice received a "nasty knock" for Richmond that he had a broken collarbone.

4 June	Marist	13–10	Newton	Carlaw Park 1
3:00	Try: Pat Meehan 2, Jim Johnson; Con: Alan Clarke 2		Try: Cameron, Ted Brimble; Pen: Arnold Porteous 2	Referee: E McCall

4 June	Ponsonby	25–22	Richmond	Carlaw Park 2
3:00	Try: Heck Lunn 2, Roy Bright, Lou Hutt 2 Con: Frank Delgrosso 3 Pen: Frank Delgrosso 2		Try: Reece Marshall, N Pell, Stan Prentice, G Calder; Con: Reece Marshall 3 Pen: Reece Marshall 2	Referee: John Stormont

4 June	Devonport	21–17	City	Devonport Domain
3:00	Try: Dick Smith, Arthur Sowter 3, J Harding; Con: Dick Smith 3		Try: Francis Herring 2, James Purdy; Con: Steve Watene 3 Pen: Steve Watene	Referee: H Carroll

==== Round 6 ====
The Marist v Richmond game featured several injuries. Richmond were without Stan Prentice who was injured the previous week and during the first half they lost John Angelo, who had transferred from Ponsonby, and Bill Telford. Harry Johns was said to have had to carry a lot of the load due to Richmond's injuries and was "a brilliant colt, with a keen eye for an opening". Roy Powell debuted for Richmond at fullback in place of Valentine. For Marist, Norm Campbell their fullback also had to leave the field and was replaced by one of the Schultz brothers. Initially Claude List moved to fullback from centre but did not play well in the unaccustomed position so they moved halfback Wilf Hassan back there and he fared well.

11 June	Devonport	7–3	Ponsonby	Carlaw Park 1
3:00	Try: Hugh Simpson; Con: Allan Seagar; Pen: Allan Seagar		Try: Shearer	Referee: Les Bull

11 June	Marist	21–13	Richmond	Carlaw Park 2
3:00	Try: James Everson, Pat Meehan, Hec Brisbane, McDonald, Charles Dunn; Con: Pat Meehan, Alan Clarke; Pen: Alan Clarke		Try: Ray Lawless, C Reynolds, Harry Johns; Con: Reece Marshall; Pen: Reece Marshall	Referee: Percy Rogers

11 June	City	13–13	Newton	Carlaw Park 1
1:30	Try: Francis Herring, Ben Davidson, William Simms; Con: Steve Watene; Pen: Steve Watene		Try: A Pope, Henry Crook 2 Con: Arnold Porteous 2	Referee: H Carroll

==== Round 7 ====
The games were played in heavy rain on a muddy Carlaw Park which was said to be in its worst state so far this season. For Richmond, Roy Powell had to leave the field in the second half after colliding with the fence. In the Ponsonby match with Newton, L Stevens (Ponsonby) was ordered off by Wilfred Simpson after questioning his decisions. He had been warned for doing this three times already. The Auckland Rugby League "severely cautioned" him during the following week at their disciplinary hearing.

18 June	Ponsonby	7–5	Newton	Carlaw Park 1
3:00	Try: George Mills; Con: Frank Delgrosso; Pen: Frank Delgrosso		Try: Charles Allan; Con: Arnold Porteous	Referee: Wilfred Simpson

18 June	City	13–13	Marist	Carlaw Park 2
3:00	Try: Stan Clark 2, George Perry; Con: Steve Watene; Drop: Ben Davidson		Try: Alan Clarke 2, Gordon Campbell; Con: Alan Clarke; Pen: Alan Clarke	Referee: Frank Thompson

18 June	Devonport	13–5	Richmond	Carlaw Park 1
1:30	Try: Dick Smith 2, Hugh Simpson; Con: Dick Smith, Allan Seagar		Try: Harry Johns; Con: Reece Marshall	Referee: Vic Simpson

==== Round 8 ====
After being injured multiple times in their round 5 match, Marists' Wilf Hassan hurt his shoulder and then later had to leave the field with a sprained ankle.

25 June	Ponsonby	26–21	Marist	Carlaw Park 1
3:00	Try: Fleming, Cyril Thompson 2, Oram, Leonard Riley, George Mills; Con: Frank Delgrosso 4		Try: Wilf Hassan, Alan Clarke, McDonald 2, Claude List; Con: Alan Clarke 3	Referee: Vic Simpson

25 June	Devonport	18–17	Newton	Carlaw Park 2
3:00	Try: Bert Leatherbarrow 2, R O'Donnell, Albert Laing; Con: Allan Seagar 2 Pen: Dick Smith		Try: Patterson, Ted Brimble, A Pope; Con: Arnold Porteous, Claude Dempsey; Pen: Arnold Porteous	Referee: C McCall

25 June	City	14–10	Richmond	Carlaw Park 2
1:30	Try: Reginald Purdy, Francis Herring; Con: Steve Watene 2 Pen: Steve Watene 2		Try: George Davis, Bill Telford; Con: Reece Marshall 2	Referee: Frank Thompson

==== Round 9 ====
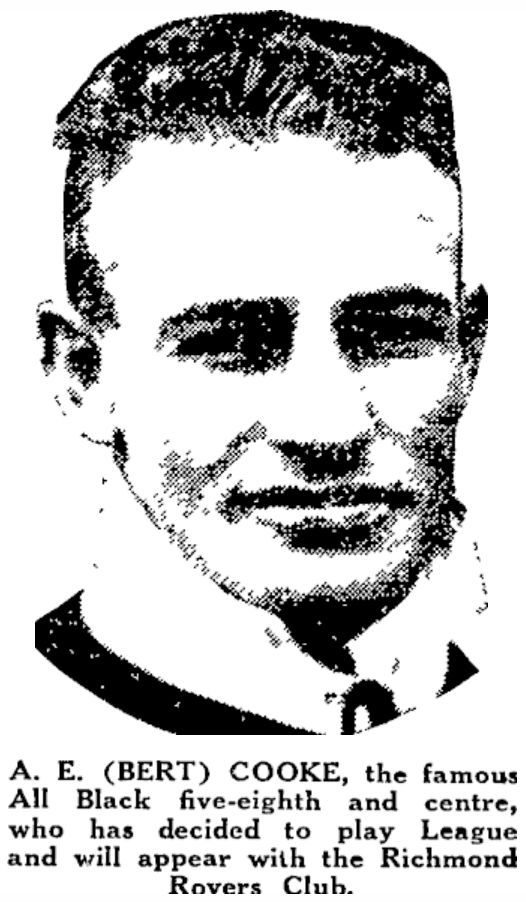
Bert Cooke (rugby) signed with the Richmond Rovers club and was registered on June 29.

Cooke played rugby league in his youth and represented the Post and Telegraph junior club for a time. Round 9 was marked by the debut of Bert Cooke for the Richmond Rovers. He was a famous All Black rugby player and his switching of codes caused great interest. He kicked a penalty in a 13-6 win over Newton at Carlaw Park. It was decided to play the reserve and senior matches between Ponsonby and City at the Northcote municipal ground at Stafford Park to help raise funds for the Northcote relief fund as the depression was in full swing by this time. A sum of nearly £7 was raised for the Northcote Relief Committee as a result of the collection taken up at the match. New Zealand international from 1930, James Jones, scored a try for Devonport. He had recently transferred from the Waikato and had coached their South Auckland representative side in 1931.

2 July	Devonport	7–5	Marist	Carlaw Park 1
3:00	Try: James Jones; Con: Dick Smith; Pen: Dick Smith		Try: Pat Meehan; Pen: Alan Clarke	Referee: Percy Rogers

2 July	Richmond	13–6	Newton	Carlaw Park 1
1:30	Try: Ralph Jenkinson 2, Ray Lawless; Con: Reece Marshall; Pen: Bert Cooke		Try: Ted Brimble, A Pope	Referee: Bert Emirali

2 July	City	32–18	Ponsonby	Stafford Park, Northcote
3:00	Try: Ben Davidson, Francis Herring, James Herring, George Perry, Reginald Purdy 3, William McLaughlin; Con: Steve Watene 2, Tim Peckham 2		Try: Leonard Riley, Frank Delgrosso, Roy Bright, Heck Lunn; Con: Frank Delgrosso 3	Referee: H Carroll

==== Round 10 ====
The Round 10 matches were originally postponed on 9 July due to heavy rain in the lead up. This created scheduling issues with the need to select an Auckland team and New Zealand team to play against the touring England side in addition to finding opponents to play the victorious Northern Union Cup winners. Ultimately the final round was not able to be played until 13 August. Marist's match with Newton saw the debut for them of Jim Laird who had transferred from Ngaruawahia and the following weekend saw him debut for New Zealand in the third test. P. McDonald the Marist winger went off injured and it was later found that he had broken his leg and spent some weeks in hospital. The effect of the England tour was evident in terms of playing strength of the senior sides and the poor crowd number. Somewhat farcically the Ponsonby side started their match with just nine players while Richmond only had twelve. The match was delayed 20 minutes to even get to this situation and it was not until ten minutes into the game that both teams managed to get to thirteen each. It was later found that Ponsonby's reserve team players who could have bolstered the side chose not to and instead played in their reserve grade match with Richmond at the Domain. The match was ostensibly the championship final, with Richmond winning 8-5 in the final round and thus winning the championship by one point. The Ponsonby club suspended the players involved along with others complicit in the matter. The issue dragged out for several weeks with the reserve coach for Ponsonby being suspended for some time by the club.

13 August	City	19–13	Devonport	Carlaw Park 1
3:00	Try: R Atkins, William McLaughlin, Purdy; Con: Maher 3 Pen: Maher 2		Try: Arthur Sowter, S Casey, Hugh Simpson; Pen: Allan Seagar 2	Referee: Frank Thompson

13 August	Ponsonby	20–11	Richmond	Carlaw Park 1
1:30	Try: Leonard Riley, A McIntyre, Fleming, George Mills; Con: Frank Delgrosso 3 Pen: Frank Delgrosso		Try: Stan Prentice, Bill Telford, Drew; Pen: Ellis	Referee: Les Bull

13 August	Marist	10–6	Newton	Ellerslie Reserve
3:00	Try: Jim Laird, Bert Schultz; Con: Alan Clarke; Pen: Alan Clarke		Try: Ray Middleton, Ed St George	Referee: Bertie Victor Emirali

=== Roope Rooster knockout competition ===
The New Zealand players had returned to their sides and Ben Davidson captained City from the centre position. Harry Johns and Bert Cooke both scored double for Richmond but it was not enough as City scored tries through George Perry, Horatio Drew, Pierce, William McLaughlin (2), and returning NZ player Puti Tipene Watene kicked three goals. In the match between Ponsonby and Newton three players were ordered off in the second half, two from Ponsonby (Heck Lunn and L Stevens) one from Newton (Ed St George). It was the second time Stevens had been ordered off this season. Players had been trading blows when Lunn was sent off and opposing hookers Stevens and St George were "wrestling" when they too were sent from the field. Ponsonby fielded Waerea at fullback with Frank Delgrosso shifting into centre when he scored 1 try and kicked six goals in their 36-10 win. Waerea had played three games for Ponsonby the previous season. George Gardiner returned to the side and scored two tries on the wing, while George Mills scored two from standoff. During the week Lunn and Stevens apologised for their behaviour to the Auckland Rugby League, while St George was suspended until he appeared before the board.

==== Round 1 ====
27 August	City	21–14	Richmond	Carlaw Park 1
3:00	Try: Pierce, Horatio Drew, William McLaughlin 2, George Perry; Con: Steve Watene 2 Pen: Steve Watene		Try: Harry Johns 2, Bert Cooke 2 Con: Ellis	Referee: Vic Simpson

27 August	Ponsonby	36–10	Newton	Carlaw Park 2
1:30	Try: Frank Delgrosso, George Gardiner 2, George Mills 2, Doug McLeay, Heck Lunn, Victor Fagan; Con: Frank Delgrosso 5 Pen: Frank Delgrosso		Try: A Pope, Emanuel; Con: Claude Dempsey; Pen: Claude Dempsey	Referee: H Carroll

==== Semi finals ====
William (Bill) Cornthwaite, the Auckland rugby representative switched codes and joined the Marist club, debuting for them in their semi-final match where he scored a try and kicked a goal in a 19–18 win over Devonport. Cornthwaite had played 11 times for Auckland from 1930 to 1932 with nine of those appearances being during this 1932 season.

3 September	City	20–17	Ponsonby	Carlaw Park 1
1:30	Try: William McLaughlin 2, Horatio Drew, Ben Davidson, Purdy, Unknown x 1 Con: Steve Watene		Try: Heck Lunn, Doug McLeay 2 Con: Frank Delgrosso 3 Pen: Frank Delgrosso	Referee: Frank Thompson

3 September	Marist	19–18	Devonport	Carlaw Park 1
3:00	Try: Claude List, Charles Dunn, James Everson, Norm Campbell, Bill Cornthwaite; Con: Alan Clarke; Pen: Bill Cornthwaite		Try: Dick Smith 2, Len Scott, C Rhodes; Con: Dick Smith, Allan Seagar; Pen: Dick Smith	Referee: Percy Rogers

==== Final ====
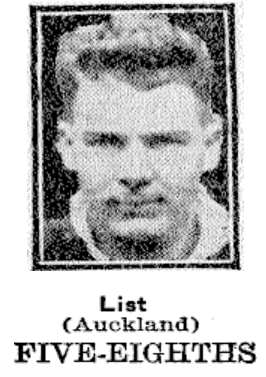

Twenty four year old, Bill (Rauaroa Tangaroapeau) Turei debuted for City after switching codes from the Manukau rugby club. He had played for New Zealand Māori against New South Wales in 1928 and was originally from Gisborne. He was a very good tennis player, making the Auckland championship finals in 1932 and had played 1 game for Auckland B rugby union side at full back in 1930. Turei would later enlist in the World War II effort and died while in Italy in 1944. Fraser Webberly played in City's forwards instead of James Everson who had broken a finger in their semi final win. Claude List playing on the wing instead of his usual centre position to accommodate Bill Cornthwaite scored four tries for the winners.

10 September	Marist	28–8	City	Carlaw Park 1
3:00	Try: Huck Flanagan, Alan Clarke, Charles Dunn, Claude List 4, Norm Campbell; Con: Alan Clarke, Norm Campbell		Try: Purdy, George Perry; Pen: Bill Turei	Referee: Les Bull

=== Stormont Shield ===
Albert Laing injured his leg ten minutes into the first half when he collided with Schultz and had to leave the field. He was replaced by R. O'Donnell who had played first five eighth for the side for the majority of the year. Devonport United led the match until about 5 minutes from time when Marist Old Boys scored the go ahead try in the corner. A large number of spectators had encroached on the field and Devonport argued that the match should be replayed but this was refused. Arguments were put forward about what could be done to keep spectators from the field as it was a recurring problem at Carlaw Park, especially with matches on the #2 field where fans would often walk across it after the #1 field match was completed despite the match on #2 still being in progress. Des Herring, the future New Zealand international was on debut for Marist and scored a try close to full time. Marist were without Gordon Campbell and Wilf Hassan who had a poisoned finger. Pat Young played at halfback in Hassan's place but struggled.

17 September	Marist	15–8	Devonport	Carlaw Park 1
3:00	Try: Pat Young, Claude List, Des Herring; Con: Bill Cornthwaite; Pen: Alan Clarke; Drop: Alan Clarke		Try: J Harding, Len Scott; Con: Dick Smith	Referee: Vic Simpson

=== Thistle Cup final ===
This was the first occasion that the Thistle Cup had been decided by a final. It was a trophy awarded to the team which accrued the most competition points in the second round of the championship. Both City and Devonport finished with 8 competition points (City secured 3 wins and 2 draws to Devonports 4 wins and 1 loss). City had to defeat Devonport in Round 10 of the championship to force this match and they repeated the result in the final by winning 22–19. City had led 22-3 at halftime before Devonport stormed back to 22-19 but were unable to take the lead despite their supporters cheering the on strongly.

24 September	City	22–19	Devonport	Carlaw Park 1
3:15	Try: Bill Turei 2, R Purdy, Pearce; Con: Bill Turei 4 Pen: Bill Turei 1		Try: L Powell, Hugh Simpson, Horace Hunt, Arthur Sowter, Allan Seagar; Con: Arthur Sowter 2	Referee: Wilfred Simpson

=== Max Jaffe Cup charity match ===
The Max Jaffe Cup was awarded to the team which finished runner up in the championship. As Marist Old Boys and Ponsonby United were tied a playoff was required.

8 October	Marist	37–8	Ponsonby	Carlaw Park 1
3:00	Try: Hec Brisbane, Bert Schultz 2, Huck Flanagan, Pat Young, Claude List 2, Fraser Webberley, James Everson; Con: Alan Clarke 2, Claude List 2, Fraser Webberley		Try: Leonard Riley, Grieve; Con: Frank Delgrosso	Referee: Les Bull

=== Top try scorers and point scorers ===
Top try and point scorers for the Fox Memorial, Roope Rooster and Stormont Shield competitions (the competitions all A Division teams competed in, along with the Max Jaffe Cup and Thistle Cup which 1st grade teams could have qualified for). Frank Delgrosso of Ponsonby was the top point scorer for the 4th time in his career with 82 points. He was regularly in the top 5 point scorers in the first grade competitions and to this point in his career had amassed more than any other player, with over 700 points for Ponsonby in all matches. The top try scorer was Claude List of Marist.

Top try scorers
Rk	Player	Team	Games	Tries
1	Claude List	Marist	13	11
2	Reginald Purdy	City	10	9
3=	Heck Lunn	Ponsonby	9	7
3=	Pat Meehan	Marist	6	7
3=	George Mills	Ponsonby	12	7
3=	Leonard Riley	Ponsonby	12	7
3=	Heck Lunn	Ponsonby	9	7
8=	Ted Brimble	Newton	11	6
8=	William McLaughlin	City	7	6
8=	Dick Smith	Devonport	12	6

Top point scorers
Rk	Player	Team	G	T	C	P	DG	Pts
1	Frank Delgrosso	Ponsonby	12	2	28	10	0	82
2	Alan Clarke	Marist	14	5	20	5	1	67
3	Dick Smith	Devonport	12	6	12	4	0	50
4	Claude List	Marist	13	11	2	0	0	37
5=	Puti Tipene Watene	City	13	0	12	5	0	34
5=	Reece Marshall	Richmond	9	4	8	3	0	34
7	Allan Seagar	Devonport	13	2	6	4	1	28
8	Reginald Purdy	City	10	9	0	0	0	27
9	Arnold Porteous	Newton	10	3	5	3	0	25
10	Pat Meehan	Marist	6	7	1	0	0	23

== Senior reserve grade competition ==
=== Senior reserve grade standings ===
Team	Pld	W	D	L	F	A	Pts
Richmond Rovers Reserves	10	8	0	2	69	44	16
Ponsonby United Reserves	10	7	1	2	77	26	15
Marist Old Boys Reserves	10	5	1	3	96	39	11
Devonport United Reserves	10	4	1	4	90	65	9
City Rovers Reserves	10	1	1	7	34	119	3
Newton Rangers Reserves	10	1	0	8	45	118	2

=== Senior reserve grade fixtures ===
Round 10 was postponed due to heavy rain prior to and on the day of the matches. The Round 10 match between Ponsonby Reserves and Richmond Reserves decided the title. Richmond won 8 to 3 in a match which later caused major controversy as several Ponsonby players played in the match and then belatedly made their way to Carlaw Park to play for the senior side. This meant that the senior match was 20 minutes late kicking off and the players involved were suspended by their club. The coach, Mr. F. C. White later took responsibility for the decision. The reserve grade team met and made a lengthy statement about their situation and actions. They felt that they had been treated unjustly and were upset with the management of the Ponsonby club during the season. Ponsonby decided to disqualify the reserve grade coach, Mr. F. C. White from his position as coach and as club vice-president for his role in the saga. The situation dragged on for several weeks with Auckland Rugby League seeking explanations from the Ponsonby club as the players in particular pleaded their case and the sanctions were largely applied by the club rather than the league.

As reporting of the reserve grade was usually limited to just the results there were weeks where results were missing altogether. The Round 5 results were not reported, and the Round 9 match between Newton and Richmond was not reported though Richmond were the winners. They were also the winners of the Round 5 match over Devonport which was crucial in enabling them to win the championship.

1932 Senior reserve results
	Date		Score		Score	Venue
Round 1	30 Apr	Ponsonby	6	Devonport	0	Carlaw Park # 1, 1:45pm
–	30 Apr	City	8	Newton	7	Auckland Domain # 2, 2pm
–	30 Apr	Richmond	5	Marist	0	Carlaw Park # 2, 2pm
Round 2	14 May	Richmond	3	Devonport	2	Auckland Domain # 2, 1:30pm
–	14 May	Marist	20	City	0	Auckland Domain # 3, 3pm
–	14 May	Ponsonby	36	Newton	6	Carlaw Park # 2, 1:30pm
Round 3	21 May	Ponsonby	3	Marist	2	Auckland Domain # 2, 1:30pm
–	21 May	Richmond	18	City	2	Carlaw Park # 2, 1:30pm
–	21 May	Devonport	20	Newton	3	Auckland Domain # 2, 3pm
Round 4	28 May	Marist	15	Devonport	5	Carlaw Park # 2, 1:30pm
–	28 May	Richmond	6	Newton	3	Auckland Domain, 1:30pm
–	28 May	Ponsonby	10	City	2	Auckland Domain, 3pm
Round 5	4 June	Newton	?	Marist	?	Carlaw Park # 2, 1:30pm
–	4 June	Ponsonby	L	Richmond	W	Carlaw Park #1, 1:30pm
–	4 June	Devonport	?	City	?	Devonport, 1:30pm
Round 6	11 June	Ponsonby	3	Devonport	2	Auckland Domain #2, 1:30pm
–	11 June	Marist	18	Richmond	11	Carlaw Park #2, 1:30pm
–	11 June	Newton	11	City	3	Auckland Domain # 2, 3pm 1:30pm
Round 7	18 June	Marist	19	City	3	Carlaw Park # 2, 1:30pm
–	18 June	Ponsonby	6	Newton	0	Auckland Domain # 1, 1:30pm
–	18 June	Devonport	9	Richmond	5	Auckland Domain # 1, 3pm
Round 8	25 June	Ponsonby	2	Marist	0	Auckland Domain # 2, 1:30pm
–	25 June	Devonport	27	Newton	15	Carlaw Park # 2, 1:30pm
–	25 June	Richmond	13	City	5	Auckland Domain # 2, 3pm
Round 9	2 July	Devonport	10	Marist	10	Carlaw Park # 2, 1:30pm
–	2 July	Richmond	W	Newton	L	Carlaw Park # 2, 3pm
–	2 July	City	6	Ponsonby	6	Stafford Park, Northcote, 2pm
Round 10	13 Aug	Devonport	15	City	5	Auckland Domain # 1, 1:45pm
–	13 Aug	Richmond	8	Ponsonby	5	Auckland Domain # 1, 1:30pm
–	13 Aug	Marist	12	Newton	0	Ellerslie 2pm

=== Stallard Cup knockout competition ===
1932 Stallard Cup results
	Date		Score		Score	Venue
Round 1	27 Aug	Richmond	18	City	11	Carlaw Park # 1, 1:30pm
–	27 Aug	Newton	14	Ponsonby	8	Carlaw Park # 2, 1:30pm
Semi Final	2 Sep	Devonport	24	Newton	9	Carlaw Park # 2, 1:30pm
Semi Final	2 Sep	Marist	13	Devonport	5	Carlaw Park # 1, 1:30pm
Final	9 Sep	Marist	12	Devonport	6	Carlaw Park # 1, 1:30pm

== Other club matches and lower grades ==
=== Lower grade clubs ===
The Davis Shield awarded to the club with the most competition points in lower grades was again awarded to Richmond. Since it had been awarded for the first time in 1921 they had won it every single year except for 1924 when City Rovers won it and 1931 when Marist Old Boys won it.

Papakura won the Wright Shield for taking out the Second Grade, Ponsonby won the Third Grade Open and were awarded the Hayward Shield, Northcote's Third Intermediate team won the Walker Cup, Point Chevalier won the Fourth Grade Hospital Cup, City Rovers won the Fifth Grade Endean Shield, Richmond won the Sixth Grade Banner and the Seventh Grade Myers Cup. The Myers Cup was the trophy originally awarded to the winners of the Senior Championship in its formative years. The Davis Shield for junior points went to Richmond with Marist in second place. This was the third year in a row that these two clubs finished in the top two positions.

==== Second grade ====
The championship was won by Papakura who defeated Otahuhu in an extra match to decide the title by 5 points to 2 on September 24. Northcote and Papakura had been tied with two rounds to go and Papakura won 5-2 to move up equal with Ōtāhuhu. This forced a playoff for the championship which Papakura won. Māngere beat Mount Albert 18–15 in the knockout final on October 15. This match was played at Onehunga and used to raise funds for the newly reformed Manukau club. Māngere had defeated Ōtāhuhu 11-2 in one semi-final while Mount Albert beat Papakura 19-8 in the other.

Team	Pld	W	D	L	F	A	Pts
Papakura	17	13	0	4	243	91	26
Ōtāhuhu Rovers	17	12	0	5	89	54	24
Northcote & Birkenhead Ramblers	16	11	0	4	62	23	22
Mount Albert United	16	8	1	5	96	52	17
Māngere United	16	6	1	5	75	70	13
Ellerslie United	16	6	0	6	62	77	12
Point Chevalier	16	3	2	8	41	85	8
Ponsonby United	16	1	0	11	49	143	2
Devonport United	16	1	0	13	28	150	2

==== Third Grade Open standings ====
Ponsonby won the championship, finishing two points clear of Richmond. Richmond won the knockout competition when they beat Ponsonby in the final 19 points to 18 on October 15. After the first round of the knockout competition there were three teams remaining (Ponsonby, Richmond, and Marist). Ponsonby beat Marist to qualify for the final, while Richmond beat the same Marist side a week later to make the final which they won.

Team	Pld	W	D	L	F	A	Pts
Ponsonby United	12	10	0	1	138	37	20
Richmond Rovers	12	9	0	3	131	39	18
Marist Old Boys	12	7	0	3	139	22	14
Mount Albert United	12	3	0	4	43	85	6
Akarana	12	3	0	7	30	63	6
Glenora	12	2	0	7	19	108	4
Papakura	13	0	0	9	15	161	0

==== Third Intermediate Grade standings ====
Northcote won the championship, 2 points ahead of City. The knockout final was won by Marist who beat Richmond on October 1 by 15 points to 12.

Team	Pld	W	D	L	F	A	Pts
Northcote & Birkenhead Ramblers	14	11	0	2	141	50	22
City Rovers	12	10	0	2	104	25	20
Marist Old Boys	14	6	0	4	120	35	12
Richmond Rovers	13	4	0	5	71	68	8
Mount Albert United	12	1	1	4	15	70	3
Devonport United	12	1	0	7	34	99	2
Akarana	13	0	1	9	10	148	1

==== Fourth Grade standings ====
The championship was won by Point Chevalier ahead of Akarana runners-up. The knockout cup was won by Akarana who defeated Papakura in the final on September 24. Papakura had defeated Ōtāhuhu in one semi final, while Akarana beat Point Chevalier in the other.

Team	Pld	W	D	L	F	A	Pts
Point Chevalier	15	11	2	2	131	29	24
Akarana	15	11	1	2	89	40	23
Papakura	15	8	0	4	75	33	16
Marist Old Boys	15	7	1	4	104	43	15
Richmond Rovers	15	6	0	7	62	71	12
Ōtāhuhu Rovers	15	4	0	5	30	47	8
Ponsonby United	15	2	0	12	35	91	4
Newton Rangers	15	0	0	12	13	185	0

==== Fifth Grade standings ====
City won the championship. The knockout final was won by Newton 3–0 over Northcote. One of the Brimble brothers who later represented New Zealand captained the Newton side. Northcote B withdrew after 6 rounds. On July 30 City beat Marist A 3-0 in a curtain-raiser to the New Zealand v England test match, while a week later Ellerslie beat City 5-2 in a curtain raiser to the Auckland-England game.

Team	Pld	W	D	L	F	A	Pts
City Rovers	16	13	0	1	131	21	26
Newton Rangers	15	12	1	2	141	23	25
Northcote & Birkenhead Ramblers A	14	12	0	2	80	22	24
Marist Old Boys B	16	11	1	4	186	60	23
Ellerslie United	17	6	0	5	123	50	12
Marist Old Boys A	17	3	3	9	76	98	9
Richmond Rovers	17	3	0	9	40	137	6
Point Chevalier	15	2	2	9	31	115	6
Akarana	13	1	3	5	30	82	5
Devonport United	17	2	0	6	69	35	4
Papatoetoe	16	1	0	12	20	268	2
Northcote & Birkenhead Ramblers B	5	0	0	2	0	15	0

==== Sixth Grade standings ====
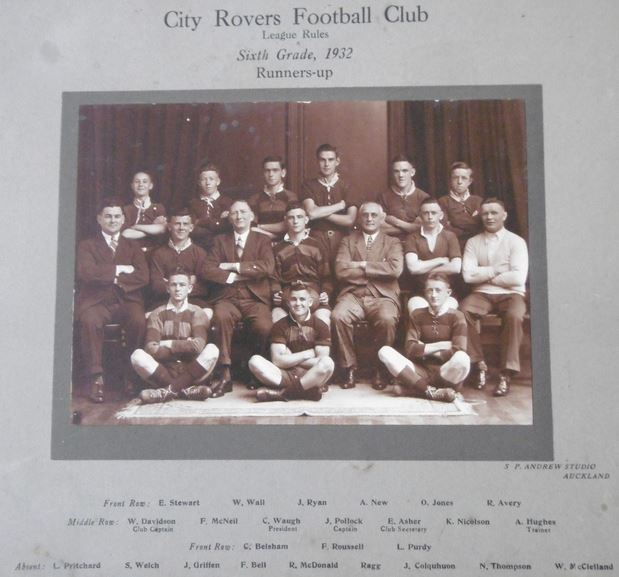
Runners up, City Rovers.

The championship was won by Richmond A who finished 6 competition points ahead of City. Richmond A also won the knockout cup when they beat Richmond B 21 points to 5 on September 17. Richmond A had defeated Point Chevalier in one semi final by 8 points to 0, while Richmond B beat City 6-5 in the other.

Team	Pld	W	D	L	F	A	Pts
Richmond Rovers A	10	9	0	0	134	0	18
City Rovers	10	5	1	4	33	52	11
Point Chevalier	10	5	1	2	92	39	11
Richmond Rovers B	9	2	0	7	28	125	4
Māngere United	9	0	0	9	8	79	0

==== Seventh Grade standings ====
In a remarkable season, the Richmond A team won the championship by 10 competition points over Devonport. They won all 12 matches and scored 333 points, conceding 0. They also won the knockout competition, defeating Māngere 27-0 in a semi final, and then Ellerslie 38-0 in the final.

Team	Pld	W	D	L	F	A	Pts
Richmond Rovers A	12	12	0	0	333	0	24
Devonport United	12	6	2	4	16	78	14
Richmond Rovers B	11	2	2	4	35	60	6
Ellerslie United	13	2	0	6	12	71	4
Māngere United	12	0	0	8	3	70	0

==== Primary schools standings ====
Ellerslie won the championship. A 'knockout' competition was played however it involved a full round robin with Ellerslie winning the final by 3 points to 0 over Newton on October 8. There were also full season competition point totals reported for Ellerslie (29), Newton (27), and Devonport (19) so it appears that the knockout competition was more appropriately named a second round competition. The full season standings are posted below however many match results were not reported so it is a composite standings.

Team	Pld	W	D	L	F	A	Pts
Ellerslie Schools	19	14	1	4	127	41	29
Newton Schools	19	12	3	4	95	31	27
Devonport Schools	18	9	1	6	45	71	19
Avondale Schools	19	8	0	5	65	83	16
City Schools	17	7	1	5	42	33	15
Ōtāhuhu Schools	17	4	1	7	66	60	9
Papatoetoe Schools	19	2	0	9	18	49	4
Northcote Schools	17	2	0	13	28	158	4
Richmond Schools	14	1	1	2	44	10	3

==== Other matches ====
	Date		Score		Score	Venue
Auckland City Mission fundraiser	23 Apr	Ponsonby Reserves	7	Marist Reserves	5	Carlaw Park # 1, 2:30pm
Exhibition match	17 Sep	Taupiri	12	City Reserves	17	Taupiri
Exhibition match	25 Sep	Kaikohe	16	Mount Albert 2nd Grade	19	Kaikohe

=== Other notable matches ===
==== Auckland City Mission fundraiser ====
Prior to the start of the season a carnival was held to raise money for the Auckland City Mission. The day included "wood chopping, whippett racing, and popular haka by a Maori group..." Marist and Ponsonby played matches with both their senior and senior reserve sides.

23 April	Marist	5–3	Ponsonby	Carlaw Park 1
3:30	Try: Phil Brady; Pen: Alan Clarke		Try: Cyril Thompson

==== Devonport v Ponsonby XIII in New Plymouth ====
On 9 September Ponsonby XIII and Devonport played an exhibition match at Pukekura Park in New Plymouth where plans were underway to form a league competition. A large crowd attended and saw a fast-paced match which ended in a 28 all draw. The Ponsonby team featured Richmond Rovers player and former All Black, Bert Cooke who had recently switched codes. It was said that he had broken a rib during the game but played on while Albert Laing left the field for a time in the second half but was able to return.

10 September	Devonport	28–28	Ponsonby XIII	Pukekura Park, New Plymouth
3:00	Try: Arthur Sowter, Len Scott, Ted Scott, S Casey, Allan Seagar, Ernest Ruby; Con: Dick Smith, Albert Laing 2 Pen: Albert Laing 2		Try: George Gardiner 2, Bert Cooke 3, J Harding; Con: Frank Delgrosso 5	Attendance: 5,000; Referee: Percy Rogers

==== Hamilton v Richmond ====
24 September	Hamilton	10-28	Richmond	Hinemoa Park, Hamilton
3:00	Try: Hogan, Holland; Con: Muir; Pen: Muir		Try: N Pell, Bert Cooke, Ellis 2, Ray Lawless, W Ritchie; Con: Ellis 4, Valentine

==== Taranaki v Marist ====
1 Oct	Taranaki	25-17	Marist	Western Park, New Plymouth
2:30	Try: W Priar 2, Jack McLeod, Wallace, James McLeod, Con: C Bedford 2, Cliff Hunt; Pen: C Bedford 2		Try: Claude List 2, Bill Schultz, Alan Clarke, Fraser Webberly; Con: Bill Cornthwaite	Attendance: 1,200; Referee: Les Bull

==== Newton XIII v Hikurangi-Waro ====
On October 8 a Newton XIII traveled to Hikurangi, north of Whangārei to play a Hikurangi combined side. The Newton side included Bert Leatherbarrow and Albert Laing of the Devonport side. One of the Newton vehicles broke down on the way there and as a result the kickoff was delayed meaning the attendance was only fair as some would be spectators left. Leatherbarrow and Hall both scored two tries each with Laing converting three of them. For Hikurangi Rod Hamilton scored a try and Ted Meyer came on for an injured player and kicked a goal.

8 Oct	Hikurangi-Waro	5-18	Newton XIII	Hikurangi
	Try: Rod Hamilton; Pen: Ted Meyer		Try: Trevor Hall 2, Bert Leatherbarrow 2 Con: Albert Laing 3	Referee: J Petterson

==== Trevor Hanlon benefit match ====
On 17 October a charity match was played between Marist and a combined Auckland club team to raise funds for the former Richmond player Trevor Hanlon to help raise funds for him to return with his family from England.

17 October	Marist	27–16	Auckland XIII	Carlaw Park 1
3:00	Try: Len Schultz 2, Wilf Hassan 3, Claude List 2 Con: Pat Meehan 2, Wilf Hassan		Try: Bert Leatherbarrow, Crooks, Heck Lunn 2 Con: Leslie Oliff 2	Referee: A.E. Chapman

== Representative fixtures ==
=== Auckland v South Auckland (Waikato) ===
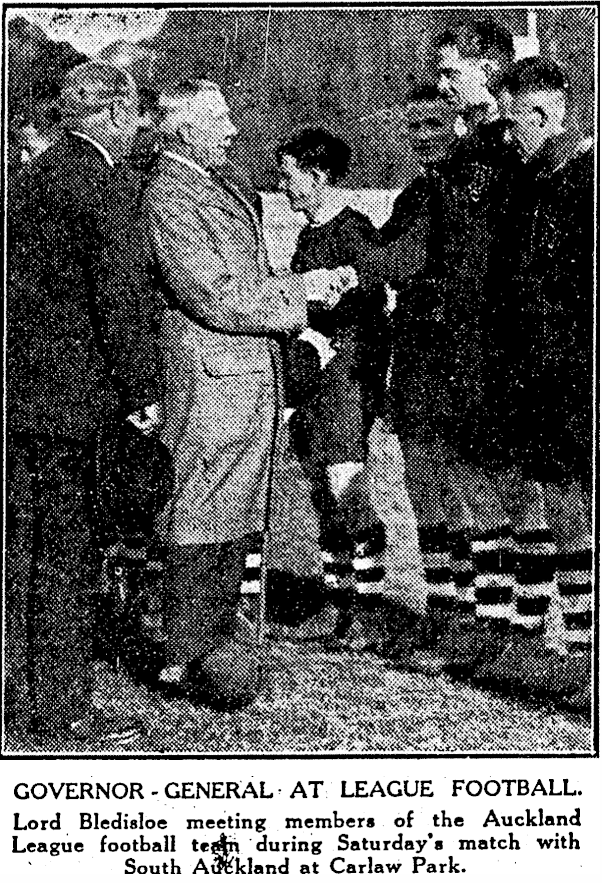

The first representative match of 1932 was between an Auckland XIII and South Auckland as part of the selection process for the upcoming England tour. Lord Bledisoe was in attendance at the match, this was the second time he had attended a Rugby League match at Carlaw Park.

16 July	Auckland XIII	29–13	South Auckland	Carlaw Park 1
3:00	Try: Claude List 3, Len Scott, Bert Cooke, Trevor Hall 2 Con: Alan Clarke 4		Try: George Tittleton, Tom Timms 2 Con: Kenneth Peckham; Pen: George Tittleton	Referee: Vic Simpson

=== Probables v Possibles trial match ===
Former New Zealand international, Maurice Wetherill made his senior refereeing debut in the match between the Probables and Possibles.

16 July	Probables	26–12	Possibles	Carlaw Park 1
1:30	Try: Henry Crook, Albert Laing, Dick Smith, Tim Peckham, Bill Telford, Doug McLeay; Con: Albert Laing 2, Tim Peckham 2		Try: Pat Meehan, A Hobbs; Con: Frank Delgrosso 2 Pen: Frank Delgrosso	Referee: Maurice Wetherill

=== Inter-Island match ===
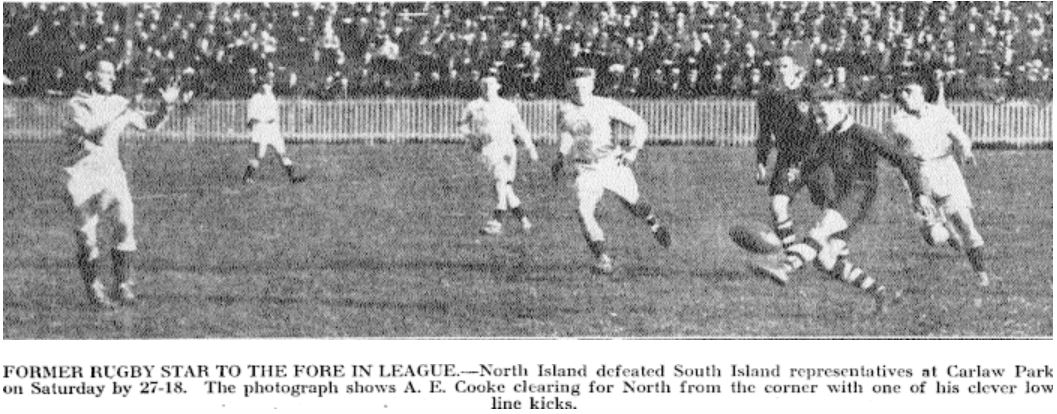
Bert Cooke (rugby) with a clearing kick for the North Island.

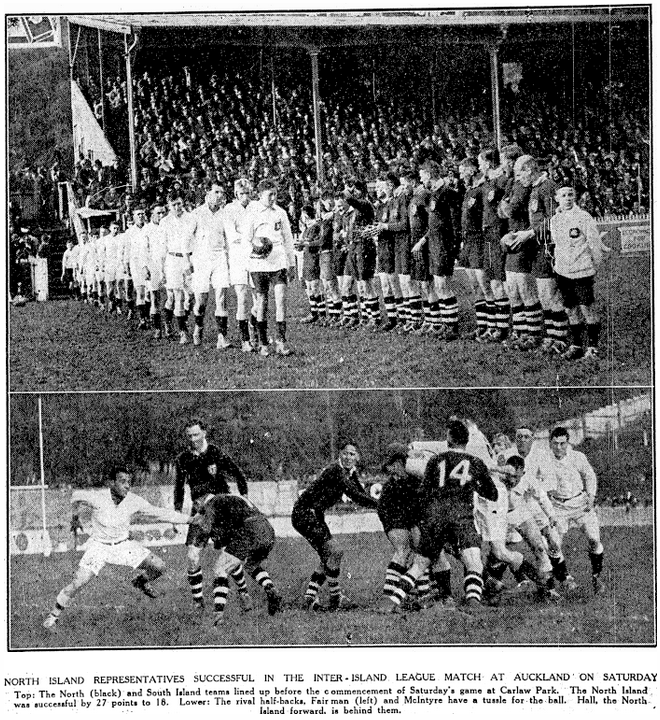

Jim Amos left the field with an injured shoulder for the South Island team and was replaced by E O'Brien. Bert Cooke made his North Island debut and played brilliantly, scoring three tries for the winners in front of a crowd of 15,000. He had only recently converted to rugby league but his performance was instrumental in his selection for the New Zealand test team. Len Scott also scored three tries with Claude List crossing for one. Albert Laing converted three of the North Island's seven tries. Laing also made his debut for New Zealand after his effort, while Scott and List also gained New Zealand selection once more after having debuted for New Zealand in 1928. For the South Island Devonport and Hamberger scored a try each. Jim Amos had kicked two goals before being replaced. Jonas Masters kicked their other three goals.

23 July	North Island	27–18	South Island	Carlaw Park 1
3:00	Try: Len Scott 3, Bert Cooke 3, Claude List; Con: Albert Laing 3		Try: J Devonport, E Hamberger; Con: Jonas Masters, Jim Amos; Pen: Jonas Masters 2, Jim Amos; Drop: E Hamberger	Attendance: 15,000; Referee: Percy Rogers

=== Probables v Possibles trial match ===
23 July	Possibles	37–16	Probables	Carlaw Park 1
3:00	Try: Ben Davidson, Ted Brimble, Harry Johns, Tim Peckham, Bill Telford, Allen St George, Doug McLeay; Con: Steve Watene 7 Pen: Steve Watene		Try: A Pope, Dick Smith, Alan Clarke, Bert Leatherbarrow; Con: Dick Smith 2	Attendance: 15,000; Referee: Bertie Emirali

=== Auckland v England ===
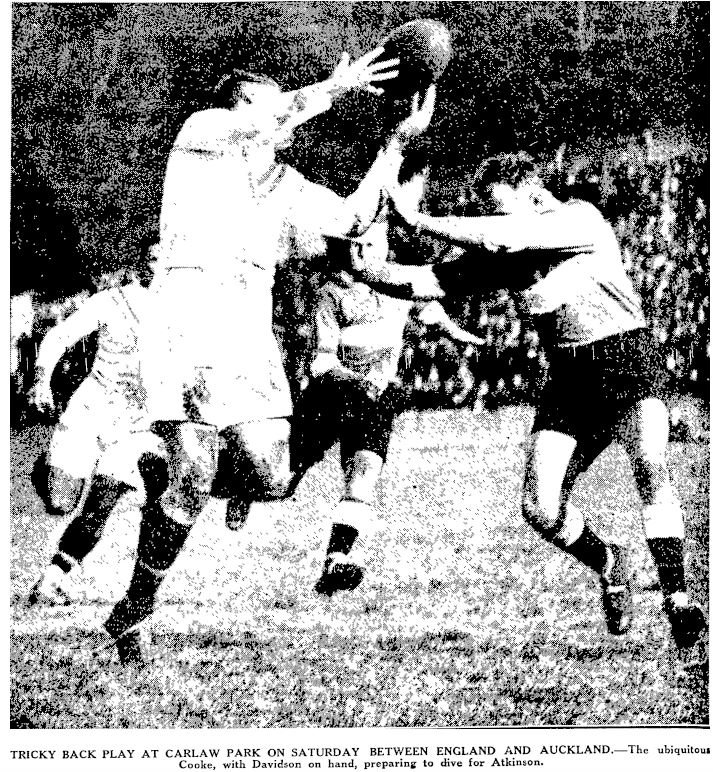
Ben Davidson attempting to tackle Artie Atkinson with Bert Cooke approaching.

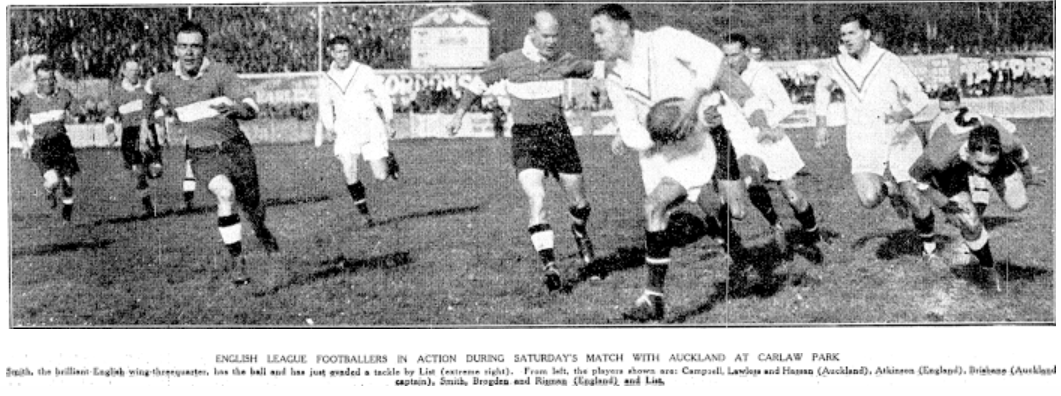

With the attraction of the England team which had recently toured Australia the league authorities added several hundred seats by building a temporary stand at the northern end of the field at Carlaw Park. The reported attendance for the match was 15,000.

6 August	Auckland	14–19	England	Carlaw Park 1
3:00	Try: Ben Davidson, Bert Cooke; Con: Alan Clarke; Pen: Alan Clarke 2 Drop: Norm Campbell		Try: Alf Ellaby 2, Artie Atkinson, Gus Risman, Stanley Smith; Con: Jim Sullivan; Pen: Jim Sullivan	Attendance: 15,000; Referee: Percy Rogers

=== Lower Waikato v Auckland (inter-provincial Sunshine Cup charity match) ===
Several of the originally named players for Lower Waikato were unable to play so a weakened lineup was fielded.

2 October	Lower Waikato	8–35	Auckland	Huntly Recreation Ground
3:00	Try: Edwin Abbott, L Knight; Pen: Kenneth Peckham		Try: Steve Watene, Leonard Riley 2, George Mills, Leslie Oliff, Bert Leatherbarrow, Ellis; Con: Steve Watene 7	Attendance: 700

=== England Tour (Carlaw Park tests) ===
Following their tour of Australia where they had a tour record of 15 wins, 1 draw, and 2 losses, including a 2–1 test series victory the English team toured New Zealand. They arrived on the Niagara ship into Auckland on 25 July and were met on the boat by Mr C.A. Sneddon, the president of the New Zealand Rugby League Council, Mr. W.O. Carlaw, secretary, and Mr. R.W. Pollock, a member of the council. They were then given a civic welcome at the Town Hall by the Mayor, Mr. G. W. Hutchison. The team stayed at the Hotel Auckland before travelling to Whangārei for their first tour match. Their programme included 8 tour matches against Northland (Won 56–5), South Auckland (Won 65–11), Auckland (Won 19–14), West Coast (Won 32–8) and North Island XIII (Won 59–8), along with three tests (Won 24–9, 25–14, and 20–18). This meant that they finished their tour with the fine record of 23–1–2. The First and Third tests were played at Carlaw Park as was the match against Auckland. The team trained at Victoria Park, Auckland on the day after their arrival in preparation for their first match of the tour.

	Date		Score		Score	Venue	Attendance
First Test	30 July	New Zealand	9	England	24	Carlaw Park # 1, 3pm	15,000
Third Test	20 Aug	New Zealand	18	England	20	Carlaw Park # 1, 3pm	12,000

=== Auckland representative matches played and scorers ===
No	Name	Club Team	Play	Tries	Con	Pen	DG	Points
1	Puti Tipene Watene	City	1	1	7	0	0	17
2	Alan Clarke	Marist	2	0	5	2	0	14
3	Claude List	Marist	2	3	0	0	0	9
4	Bert Cooke	Richmond	2	2	0	0	0	6
4	Trevor Hall	Newton	2	2	0	0	0	6
4	Leonard Riley	Ponsonby	1	2	0	0	0	6
7	Ben Davidson	City	2	1	0	0	0	3
7	Len Scott	Devonport	1	1	0	0	0	3
7	George Mills	Ponsonby	1	1	0	0	0	3
7	Leslie Olliff	Devonport	1	1	0	0	0	3
7	Bert Leatherbarrow	Devonport	1	1	0	0	0	3
7	Ellis	Richmond	1	1	0	0	0	3
13	Norm Campbell	Marist	2	0	0	0	1	2
14	Hec Brisbane	Marist	2	0	0	0	0	0
14	A McIntyre	Ponsonby	1	0	0	0	0	0
14	Lou Hutt	Ponsonby	2	0	0	0	0	0
14	Gordon Campbell	Marist	2	0	0	0	0	0
14	Stan Clark	City	3	0	0	0	0	0
14	Ray Lawless	Richmond	3	0	0	0	0	0
14	Claude Dempsey	Newton	1	0	0	0	0	0
14	Henry Crook	Newton	1	0	0	0	0	0
14	Ted Brimble	Newton	1	0	0	0	0	0
14	C Stevens	Ponsonby	1	0	0	0	0	0
14	Bill Telford	Richmond	1	0	0	0	0	0
14	Doug McLeay	Ponsonby	1	0	0	0	0	0
14	Pat Meehan	Marist	1	0	0	0	0	0
14	Wilf Hassan	Marist	1	0	0	0	0	0

== Annual general meetings and club news ==
- Auckland Rugby League put out separate tenders for refreshment booth and advertising rights. The advertising was for fences at Carlaw Park. Their annual meeting was held at the Chamber of Commerce on 30 April.
- Auckland Rugby League Referees Association held a meeting which was attended by over 40 members with Mr. A. Ball presiding over it. Mr. Wilf Simpson advocated for the appointment of a sole selector to grade referees. After some discussion over whether one was enough given the size of the association his recommendation was carried. Their annual meeting was scheduled for 4 April. Their annual meeting saw a record attendance of 53 and it was stated that there had such an increase in members that it would be necessary to limit membership in the future. Mr. A. Ball was elected president. The Referees Association refused to appoint line umpires for the third test between England and New Zealand at Carlaw Park. Their reason for this was to register their disapproval through the Auckland Rugby League to the New Zealand Rugby League Council because the English managers had overlooked their referees to rule over the test match. Instead they had used a referee for the 2nd and 3rd tests who they had not submitted. They felt that visiting team managers should accept the recommended referees.
- Akarana Rugby League Football Club held their general meeting at Carlaw Park on Sunday 17 April.
- City Rovers held their annual meeting at Carlaw Park on Sunday, 27 March. The report referred to a club record number of teams in all competitions of eight. Mr. C. Waugh was elected president.
- Devonport United Rugby League Football Club held their annual meeting at the Labour Rooms above Hellaby's, Devonport on Wednesday, 23 March. Mr. A.W.D. Meiklejohn was elected patron and they congratulated the schoolboys on winning the Kiely Cup.
- Ellerslie United League Football Club held practices at the Ellerslie Reserve beginning on Saturday 2 April. Mr. G. Harrison resigned as secretary after ten years in the position. They held an urgent general meeting on 18 April after finding out from the League that they would be excluded from the first grade championship.
- Ellerslie-Otahuhu United League Football Club held their annual general meeting in the club's training shed, Ellerslie on Monday, 21 March.
- Marist Brothers Old Boys League Football Club held their annual meeting at Donovan's Gymnasium, Parnell on Wednesday, 30 March.
- Māngere United League Football Club held their annual meeting in St. James’ Hall, Mangere Bridge on Wednesday, 23 March.
- Mt. Albert United Rugby League Football Club held their annual meeting at King George Hall, Mt Albert on Wednesday, 16 March. The meeting was presided over by Mr. R. Wilson and Mr. B. Brigham was elected patron. Practice was to begin the following Saturday on the club's ground at Springleigh Avenue. Lou Pearson was the team manager.
- Mt Wellington Rugby League Football Club were renamed Otahuhu Rugby League Club.
- Newton Rangers Football Club held their annual meeting on Monday, 14 March at the Y.M.C.A. It was presided over by Mr. Bradley with a large attendance of members. Mr. W. Monteith was elected patron.
- Northcote and Birkenhead Ramblers League Football Club held their annual meeting on Monday, 7 March at Victoria Hall, Birkenhead. More than 50 people attended the meeting with Mr. D. Wilkie presiding. The report stated that the club recorded a £30 profit. An engraved wristlet watch was presented to Mr. W.J. Dean for his service to the club as secretary and treasurer for the past three years. They planned on entering five junior teams along with a schoolboy thirteen. The club also decided to tell the Northcote Borough Council that they would be prepared to contribute to the cost of an addition to the dressing shed at the Northcote Municipal football ground. Practices were held at McKinstry's Paddock, Roseberry Avenue. The Northcote High School board allowed use of its rugby field on alternate Saturdays to the Ramblers. On the other Saturdays the Northcote and Birkenhead Rugby Union Football Club would use it.
- Otahuhu Rugby League Football Club had ceased to operate following the forced merger with Ellerslie but the Mount Wellington club had requested from Auckland Rugby League that they be renamed Otahuhu and the request was granted.
- Papakura Rugby League Football Club held their annual meeting on 22 March. Mr. E. C. Foote was elected patron and it was decided to make him a presentation in recognition of his service to the club. At a meeting of the Papakura Town Board the Rugby League club were granted use of the Railway Reserve on the same terms as the 1931 season. The club held a dance in the Star Theatre on Monday 18 April. Mr. and Mrs. G. Rogers won the Monte Carlo, and Mr. Alec Beams won the cake competition. It was decided to run a fortnightly dance during the season as this one was such a success.
- Point Chevalier League Football Club annual meeting was held at the Sailing Club's Hall on Wednesday 16 March.
- Ponsonby United Football Club annual meeting was held at Leys Institute on Monday, 14 March. The decided to change from the one selector system to a three selector system with F. White, S. Lowry, and N.D. Culpan chosen to pick the sides. Mr. A. H. McKeown was elected patron. Practises began on Sunday 2 April with players instructed to meet at Three Lamps, Ponsonby.
- Richmond Rovers Football Club annual meeting was held on Friday, 4 March at the Gaiety Hall, Surrey Crescent.
