= Bert Laing =

Australia & NZ international rugby league footballer

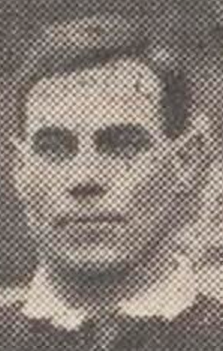

Personal information
- Full name: Henry Bircher Laing
- Born: 3 August 1893 Norfolk Island, Australia
- Died: 25 April 1963 (aged 69) New Zealand

Playing information
- Height: 168 cm (5 ft 6 in)
- Weight: 78.2 kg (12 st 4 lb)
- Position: Stand-off
Club
Years	Team	Pld	T	G	FG	P
1919–22	City Rovers (ARL)	25	7	2	0	25
1922–30	Devonport United	65	21	50	3	169
	Total	90	28	52	3	194
Representative
Years	Team	Pld	T	G	FG	P
1919–26	Auckland	13	10	4	0	38
1922	Auckland Province	1	2	0	0	6
1919–1925	New Zealand	12	0	2	0	4
1921–22	Australasia	10	3	0	0	9
1926	North Island	1	1	0	0	3

Coaching information
Representative
Years	Team	Gms	W	D	L	W%
1922	Devonport United	14	7	1	6	50
1934–1936	Devonport United	55	25	7	23	45
1938	Manukau	23	15	1	7	65
- Relatives: Albert Laing (brother)

Henry Bircher "Bert" Laing (1893-1963) was a New Zealand rugby league player who represented New Zealand and Australasia. His brother, Albert, was also a New Zealand international.

== Playing career ==
Laing, a standoff from Auckland, represented New Zealand between 1919 and 1925 and was the team's captain in 1925. However he never played in a Test match for New Zealand, due to the team usually playing New South Wales and Queensland during this period.

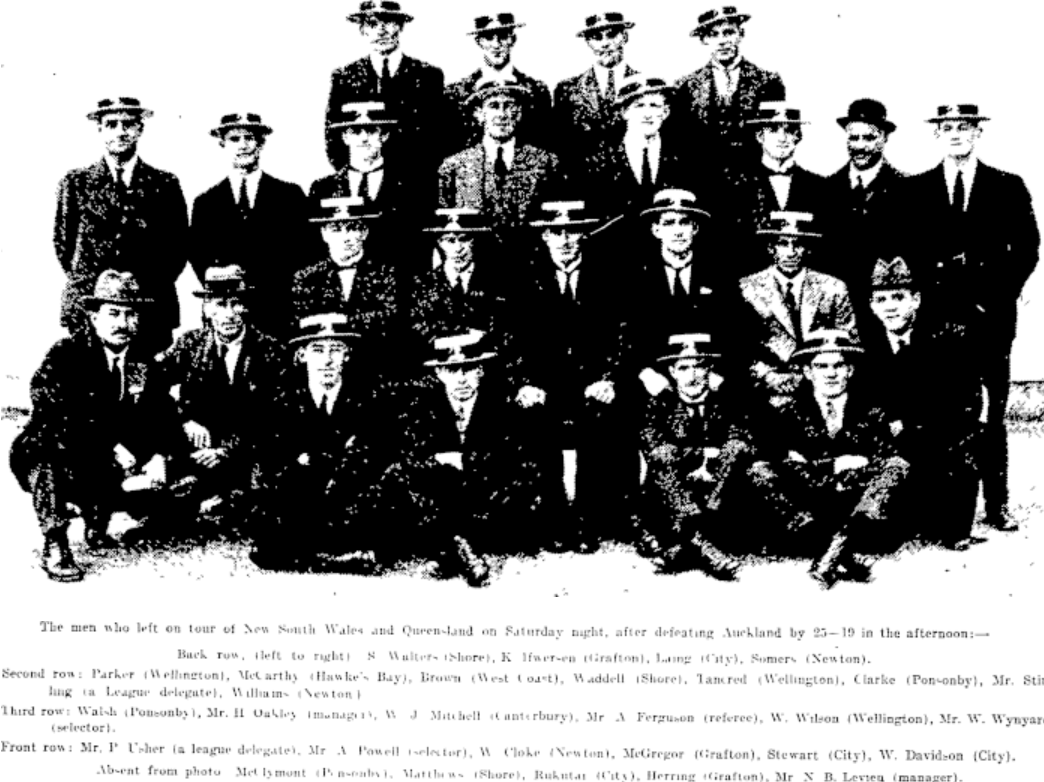
The 1919 New Zealand team to tour New South Wales and Queensland. Bert Laing is in the back row, second from the right.

In 1921, he was the only New Zealander selected to represent Australasia during the 1921–22 Kangaroo tour of Great Britain. He scored one try and played in ten matches on tour but was not selected for any of the three Test matches.

Laing played for the City Rovers from 1919 to 1922 but transferred to Devonport United during the 1922 season. During the 1920s, he played some matches with his younger brother Julius for Devonport. He retired at the end of the 1926 season but came out of retirement to play 2 matches for Devonport in 1927 and then four more matches in 1930. Another of his brothers, Albert Laing debuted for Devonport in late 1931 and also went on to play for New Zealand.

== Coaching career ==
Bert coached the North Shore Albions from 1934 to 1936, and the Manukau seniors in 1938. His son, Jack Laing played senior rugby league for North Shore in the 1940s.

== Death ==
Bert Laing died on April 25, 1963. He was cremated at Purewa Cemetery and his ashes were returned to his family.
