= 1934 Auckland Rugby League season =

The 1934 Auckland Rugby League season was its 26th. The senior championship was won by Richmond Rovers who ran away with the title with an 11 win, 2 loss record. Such was their dominance that a 14th round was not played as Richmond had a 6-point lead over their nearest competitor Newton Rangers. Richmond also won the Roope Rooster knockout competition with a 20 to 13 win over Marist Old Boys in the final. Their remarkable season also included the Stormont Shield which they won 21 to 5 over Newton Rangers. This was the first ever time that an Auckland club had won all three senior grade titles in the same season. The Richmond reserve grade team also won the title which was remarkable in that they lost their first two matches before reeling off 12 consecutive wins to claim the title. They also won the Stallard Cup knockout competition when they beat City Rovers Reserves 21 to 9. Richmond also recorded two wins over the touring Western Suburbs side who had won the New South Wales premiership with 18–16 and 10–3 wins.

The Roope Rooster competition saw the debut of the Mt Albert and Papakura senior teams playing in a senior A grade competition. Both teams performed meritoriously before Mt Albert went down to Ponsonby 19 to 11, and Papakura lost to Marist 6 points to 3. Both teams then played in the inaugural Phelan Sheld competition which was ultimately won by Newton Rangers.

The Auckland representative team had a successful season recording wins over Taranaki by 35 to 8, Northland 19 to 12, and South Auckland by 36 to 16. The season also saw the first ever match for an official Auckland Māori team which played under the name Tamaki. New Zealand Māori rugby league teams had been formed and toured Australia in the 1910s and 20s but none had specifically represented Auckland. There had been club teams in Auckland largely recognised as being 'Māori' teams in the Manukau and Onehunga area since rugby league formed in the area around 1908–1911. During the 1934 season the Mangere Māori team also played several tour matches along with its Auckland competition matches.

| Preceded by 1933 | 26th Auckland Rugby League season 1934 | Succeeded by 1935 |

== Season News ==
=== Club teams by grade participation ===
| Team | Fox Memorial | Reserves | 2nd | 3rd Open | 3rd Int. | 4th | 5th | 6th | 7th | Schools | Total |
|---|---|---|---|---|---|---|---|---|---|---|---|
| Richmond Rovers | 1 | 1 | 0 | 1 | 1 | 1 | 1 | 1 | 2 | 1 | 10 |
| Devonport United | 1 | 1 | 0 | 0 | 1 | 0 | 1 | 1 | 1 | 1 | 7 |
| Marist Old Boys | 1 | 1 | 0 | 1 | 1 | 1 | 0 | 0 | 0 | 2 | 7 |
| City Rovers | 1 | 1 | 0 | 0 | 1 | 0 | 1 | 0 | 1 | 1 | 6 |
| Ponsonby United | 1 | 1 | 0 | 1 | 1 | 0 | 1 | 0 | 0 | 0 | 5 |
| Newton Rangers | 1 | 1 | 0 | 0 | 0 | 1 | 0 | 1 | 0 | 0 | 4 |
| Mount Albert United | 0 | 0 | 1 | 1 | 0 | 1 | 0 | 0 | 1 | 0 | 4 |
| Papakura | 0 | 0 | 1 | 0 | 1 | 1 | 1 | 0 | 0 | 0 | 4 |
| Point Chevalier | 0 | 0 | 1 | 0 | 1 | 1 | 0 | 1 | 0 | 0 | 4 |
| Manukau Rovers | 0 | 0 | 0 | 0 | 2 | 1 | 1 | 0 | 0 | 0 | 4 |
| Otahuhu Rovers | 0 | 0 | 1 | 0 | 1 | 1 | 0 | 0 | 0 | 1 | 4 |
| Ellerslie United | 0 | 0 | 1 | 0 | 0 | 1 | 0 | 1 | 0 | 1 | 4 |
| Northcote & Birkenhead Ramblers | 0 | 0 | 0 | 0 | 1 | 1 | 0 | 0 | 1 | 1 | 4 |
| Glenora | 0 | 0 | 0 | 1 | 1 | 1 | 0 | 0 | 0 | 0 | 3 |
| Māngere United | 0 | 0 | 1 | 1 | 0 | 0 | 0 | 0 | 0 | 0 | 2 |
| Akarana | 0 | 0 | 0 | 1 | 1 | 0 | 0 | 0 | 0 | 0 | 2 |
| Avondale | 0 | 0 | 0 | 0 | 0 | 0 | 0 | 1 | 0 | 1 | 2 |
| Total | 6 | 6 | 6 | 7 | 13 | 9 | 8 | 6 | 7 | 9 | 77 |

=== Auckland Rugby League meetings ===
At the annual meeting of the junior management committee on 20 March the report they received showed that the number of players and clubs had increased by over 11% and 14% respectively. Registration fees were an increase on 1932 by £12 4/6. Mr. D. Wilkie was elected chairman, Mr. E. Chapman deputy chairman, while Mr. Mr. W.F. Clarke was elected secretary to replace the long serving and retiring Mr. T.R. Davis. Davis was later appointed as a life member of New Zealand Rugby League, as was Arthur Ball (ex-chairman of the Auckland Rugby League Referees’ Association), and C. Adamson (ex-chairman of the Junior Management Committee).

The annual meeting of the Auckland Rugby League was held in the League Rooms, Grey Buildings, on Monday, 9 April. The report presented showed that the balance-sheet figures improved on the previous season. "The principal of sharing the gate receipts with the clubs competing... has without doubt proved very beneficial in creating the team spirit to improve the standard of play required for No. 1 ground qualification each week-end and also has been reflected in a greater esprit de corps amongst club members, as well as a correspondingly enhanced friendly rivalry between the contestants that in turn excites public patronage to Carlaw Park". The gate takings were over £400, being available as grants to senior clubs in 1933. The working gate takings were £1,953 12/9 from club matches (an increase of £158). Ground rents of £154 7/ were lower but profits of £196 18/ were recorded from matches with visiting provincial teams. Registered player fees accounted for £99 12/ and this combined with donations and the earlier stated income meant total receipts of £2,636 2/5. Expenditure was £487 17/6 on ground rents, £340 17/2 on maintenance and upkeep of the park and grounds, £175 on staffing grounds and cost to officials, and minor expenses. This meant a balance of £21 4’8 to be carried forward. The profit and loss account showed a surplus of assets valued at £6,415 19/7.

Reference was also made to the services of George Rhodes who had died at the end of the 1933 season after many years as chairman of the league. At the annual meeting the following officers were elected: patron, Mr. J.B. Donald; vice-patron, Mr. J.F.W. Dickson; president, Mr. James Carlaw; vice-presidents, Messrs. O. Blackwood, H. Grange, W. Wallace, C. Seagar, R. Benson, C.H. Drysdale, A.E. Laird, John A. Lee, R.H. Wood, R.P. Sharman, J. Donald, Joe Sayegh, J. Lovatt, W.S. Shramm, E. Morton, H. Walmsley, C. Wright, Montgomery and Bagnall; deputy-chairman, Mr. E.J. Phelan; hon. Secretary, Mr. Ivan Culpan; hon treasurer, Mr. James Edward (Ted) Knowling (MBE); delegate to New Zealand Rugby League, Mr. Robert Doble; auditor, Mr. R.A. Spinley; hon solicitor, Mr. H.M. Rogerson; referees’ delegate on the management committee, Mr. William (Bill) Mincham; club delegates, Mr Jim Rukutai and J.W. Probert; hon physicians, Drs. R. Tracey Inglis, Mr. G. Pezaro, F.J. Gwynne and K.H. Holdgate; press steward, Mr. Robert Doble; board of control, Messrs. Campbell, Rukutai, Robert Doble, Lewis Binns, Probert, Bill Mincham, David Wilkie, Ellis, Ted Knowling and Ivan Cuplan; trustees, Messrs. John Stormont, E.J. Phelan, and G. Grey Campbell.

At a board of control meeting in April it was decided that unemployed patrons would be admitted to Carlaw Park with the same concession as the previous season provided they produced their levy book regularly and it was stamped by the Labour Department. At the same meeting Mt Albert United applied to have their colours changed from mauve to blue and gold. This was referred to the junior management committee.

=== Rules ===
It was reported that in the latest English rule book there was a goal line drop out being taken when teams forced the ball in their own in goal area and that New Zealand would also adopt the rule. It was decided to implement the rule at the start of the second round. After clarifying the interpretation of the law in England it was established that the attacking team needed to stand five yards from the goal-line when the defending side drops the ball out from between its posts.

Continued dissatisfaction was felt around the policing of the play the ball which caused problems. And late tacking was also said to be spoiling play. The referee committee said at their 21 May meeting that they intended to take drastic action on this matter. At the Auckland Rugby League Board of Control meeting on 23 May chairman Campbell drew attention to the practice of players charging into opponents and using their knees. He said it was a serious offence, not a tackle and not football at all. The referees association took up the matter and said that all senior clubs would be written to and told that such conduct would not be tolerated. As a result of a large number of matches which were late kicking off due to teams arriving late or match officials arriving late or not at all the league pointed out "that a visiting team could be granted a 15-minute concession in starting and the length of spells could be reduced to 35 minutes each way by mutual agreement between the captains".

At its weekly meeting the Board of Control banned metal sprigs after the Newton club's officials and players complained “strongly” against their use.

=== The senior competition ===
It was decided that the championship would commence on 28 April and consist of three rounds. However the Auckland Rugby League would reserve the right to select the four leading teams to hasten the find for the champions if necessary.

The league promoted the senior competition by taking the unusual approach of naming all the senior coaches and including boastful quotes from each of them in its newspaper advertisements. The advertisement went "What the Coaches say: Lar Seagar: Devonport will again be Champion and Champion of Champions. Scotty McClymont: Richmond will be hard. The Rooster will be a Champion this year. Duggie McGregor: Nothing can stop Newton winning. Pope Gregory: Marist O.B. will win from the start. The team is in great heart. Frank Delgrosso: Ponsonby will this year produce the finest League team for many a day. Ben Davidson: City Rovers will be the sensation of the season. A team of All Blacks".

Newton, Richmond, and Ponsonby all sported new uniforms which were well received after their opening matches.

=== Carlaw Park ===
A new stand was planned for Carlaw Park to be built prior to the “next winter season”. It would cost £3,000 and have “concrete foundations and built in wood”. Preliminary architectural plans were submitted by Mr Piper and Mr. Brooker. “The new stand while embracing the present stand, which would harmonise with the main design, will provide seating accommodation for from 2,500 to 3,000 people. It will incorporate the latest facilities for public and players. Teams will take the field from under the central part of the stand”. The stands would also feature a large room for each senior club “fitted with lockers, and hot and cold showers would be a feature of the dressing rooms, which will be built under the stand. Conveniences for the general public will also be provided”. The present grandstand would be renovated and the new build would have “glass fronts and sides, to protect spectators from the wet weather... the work is to be commenced immediately, and it may be completed within two weeks of the opening of the 1934 season”.

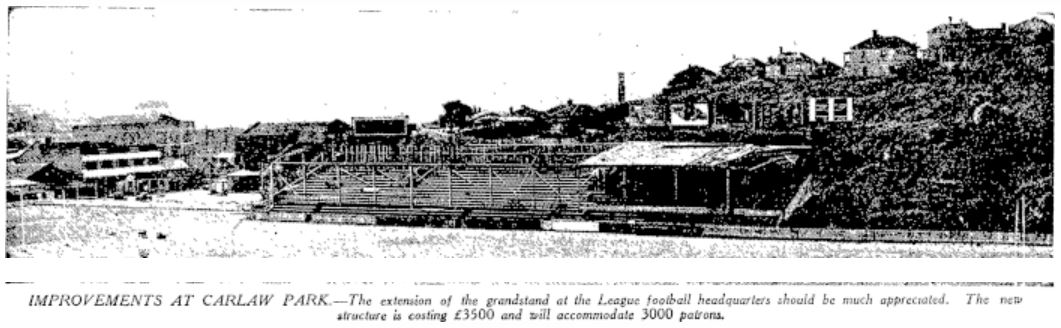
Carlaw Park work underway in late April.

Work started on the new grandstand on 9 March after the plans and specifications were "perused by the Auckland City Council, which proposed several alterations with a view to improvement of the building". The changes were accepted by the trustees of the Auckland Rugby League but it would mean in increase in the contract price to a little over £3,000. It was aimed to complete the contract in May. Mr. E.J. Phelan, a trustee and vice chairman of Auckland Rugby League announced that the successful tenderer was Mr. R.A. Cornish of Newmarket. The architects were Mr. L.S. Piper and Mr. L.E. Brooker who had submitted the initial plans. By 15 March excavation works had been undertaken and were near completion. The board inspected them on 16 March. Ponsonby United donated £150 and it was hoped at the annual meeting that other clubs would also contribute £50 each towards the costs. On 21 April the league arranged practice matches at Carlaw Park with the main match being between Marist and Ponsonby with those teams reserve grade sides playing the curtain-raiser. A charge of sixpence admission would go towards the grandstand funds which was expected to be completed by the following week. Ponsonby defeated Marist by 13–0. The stand ultimately cost £3,500 and as it neared completion the New Zealand Herald published a photograph of it. In order to further help pay for the new stand the league sold 300 season tickets to the new stand which would entitle the purchaser to attend all matches under the control of the Auckland Rugby League this year. The tickets would cost £1 each. A third anonymous offer of £100 was received from a supporter of the code which was gratefully accepted at the Board of Control meeting on 9 May. The new grandstand was to be opened on Saturday 12 May by Governor-General, Lord Bledisloe and the clubs.

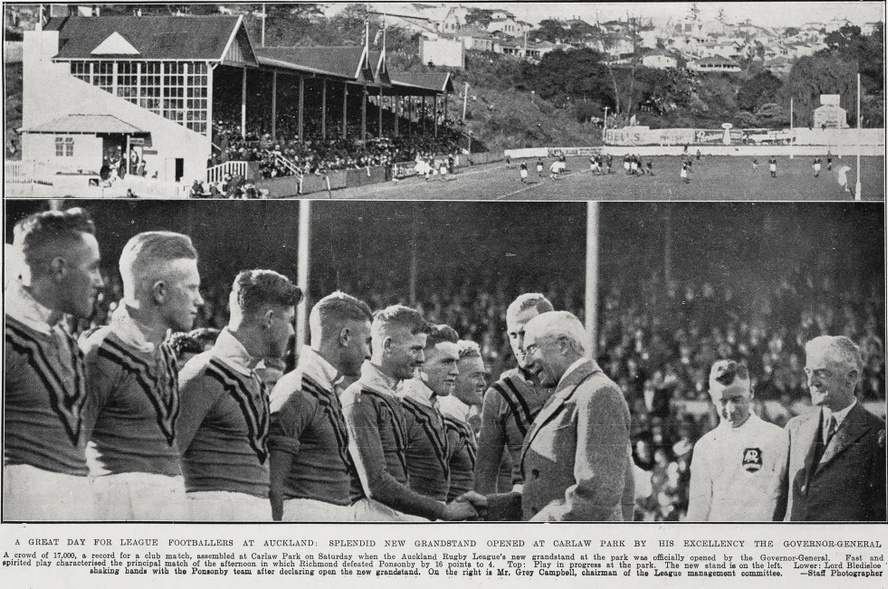
On 12 May the new grandstand was officially opened by Lord Bledisloe in front of 17,000 spectators which was a record for a club match. Following the matches the six senior and six reserve teams "took up their respective club quarters in the new grandstand... and were delighted with the improved facilities. The Ponsonby Boys’ Band played at the park and the pavilion was thrown open for public inspection". Lord Bledisloe had said when opening the new stand that "he had always been a firm believer in the advantages of football, both as a means of developing physique, and in forming character and a sense of discipline. Some 24 years ago on the area which was now Carlaw Park the Chinese, he understood, had cultivated vegetables; to-day the ground was in use for the cultivation of sport and of health and character, which flowed from sport when conducted fairly, honestly and in a spirit of unselfishness. Congratulating the League organisation on its enterprise Lord Bledisloe ventured the hope that the sport would continue and flourish, and be maintained in New Zealand for many years to come". He went on to say that the "erection of the new pavilion had provided useful work for about 60 men... and was built of good New Zealand rimu timber. In spite of the new stand and facilities the league still received a letter from Ellerslie United complaining about the inadequate shower facilities at the ground.

Lights were installed in the park later in the season and at the final ARL meeting of the year a vote of thanks was "accorded Mr F.E. McEwan, the Ponsonby Club treasurer, for his work in connection with the lighting facilities".

=== Chairman Campbell's Sydney visit ===
Mr. G. Grey Campbell, chairman of the league visited Sydney to meet administrators of the game there. He returned to Auckland on 7 April. He said that there was a possibility that the Sydney University team would make a visit along with the Sydney premiership winners. Campbell said that his visit had shown "him how seriously the management committees of the various clubs regarded training. They had more control over the players than did New Zealand. The object... was to get the teams on the ground in the best condition possible. They believed that the team "that gets in first" gave the others a handicap that took some getting over during the season, and no time and money were spared in preparation".

=== Broadcast of matches from Carlaw Park ===
The district radio engineer, Mr. L.L. Macey stated that there was "no ban on the broadcasting of Rugby League football in Auckland", however the station 1ZB was going to be unable to broadcast matches. The reason being that its application for an extension of broadcasting hours had been turned down by 'Wellington' and as the football was played outside of their broadcast hours they would be unable to carry any coverage. The decision was met by indignation from New Zealand Rugby League and it was decided to strongly protest and follow up with other action. The protest entailed an immediate telegraph to the Postmaster General "against unfair discrimination at the cost of the many supporters of the game who paid for licenses as listeners...the executive also was requested to communicate with individual members of Parliament on the subject, and the incoming committee was urged to take further action, if necessary, as it was a matter of urgency to the code and to the general public". 1ZB had applied two months earlier and was ready to begin broadcasting from the opening weekend of matches however the decision not to allow it had occurred in the days prior to the season opening. Rugby Union was going to be broadcast out of the Broadcasting Boards own funds, and soccer was going to be broadcast through 1YA. Chairman of New Zealand Rugby League, Mr. Cyril Sneddon said "well, it looks as though there is at the moment a ban, or threatened ban, on Rugby League football – just another tilt at the code". There were many other accusations of "strings being pulled" made by delegates from around the regions. It was decided by the Hon. Adam Hamilton, Postmaster-General to arrange for the broadcasting of Auckland League football match results. He advised a deputation that he would ascertain if the service could be fitted in with the programme of 1YA or 1YX at a lengthy meeting on the issue where many voices were heard. Station 1ZB rearranged their Saturday programme so that rugby league broadcasts could be done. They cut out a portion of their Saturday morning programme to make room for the afternoon broadcast of the league. This meant that they did not need to apply to an extension of their hours. The decision was met very favourably by league chairman Campbell who said "we are very pleased with the result...listeners in the country districts especially will appreciate the action of 1ZB in meeting that has become a widespread demand for the broadcasting of League matches from Carlaw Park".

=== Life memberships ===
Mr. T. Davis was elected a life member of the Auckland Rugby League after he had retired. He had served as a delegate for five years, and for eight years he was the secretary of the junior management committee. At the 30 May meeting, Mr. F.D. Ellis was made a life member, he had been on the board and served as treasurer for 14 years. He was resigning due to ill health and moving to Australia.

=== Hec Brisbane's retirement ===
At the end of the season New Zealand international and long serving Marist Old Boys player Hec Brisbane decided to retire. He had debuted for Marist in the 1923 season and played for them continuously ending up having played for 11 seasons and made 158 appearances for them, scoring 71 tries. Brisbane made his Auckland debut in 1923 and played for Auckland 14 times, scoring 9 tries and 1 appearance for Auckland Province. Brisbane played 5 times for the North Island where he scored 7 tries in clashes with the South Island. His international debut for New Zealand came in just his second season, in 1924, with his final appearance in the black and white jersey in 1932. In total he played for New Zealand on 50 occasions, including 10 tests and he scored 21 tries and kicked 6 goals, with 5 tries coming in tests. On 27 October his Marist club played a benefit match in his honour against Newton Rangers at Carlaw Park. His Marist side won by 30 points to 21. Brisbane went on the serve on the Marist committee for several years and in 1937 was the sole selector for the Auckland representative team and he held the same role with others from 1938 to 1940. He was the North Island selector in 1938 and 1939. In 1938 he was appointed New Zealand selector with Thomas McClymont, and Jim Amos to choose the side to tour Australia.

=== Phelan Shield's debut ===
The Phelan Shield (which is still competed for today) was first awarded in 1934. It was a "handsome carved shield" presented to Auckland Rugby League by Edward John Phelan (known commonly as Ted Phelan), one of the trustees of rugby league in Auckland. The shield was played for by the 4 losing teams from the first round of the Roope Rooster and was won by Newton who defeated Ponsonby in the final by 18 points to 10.

=== Origin of the Sharman Cup ===
On 20 October, at the Charity Day at Carlaw Park, a "beautiful silver cup" was handed over by Mr. J Smith on behalf of Mr. R.P. Sharman. He was the merchandise manager of George Court and Sons Ltd and was being transferred to London, England. He wished to leave "a happy recollection of his association with league football" and wished that the trophy should be awarded in "a competition worthy of its value". The trophy is still played for today in lower senior grades.

=== Obituary ===
==== Arthur Carlaw ====
On 12 November Arthur Carlaw died in Christchurch aged 51. He was a stonemason by trade and the nephew of James Carlaw, who Carlaw Park was named after. Arthur Carlaw was one of the pioneers of the rugby league game in New Zealand and made 20 appearances for Auckland from 1909 to 1913, and 17 matches for New Zealand over the same years. He also played 25 times for Ponsonby United from 1908 to 1913. Carlaw moved to Christchurch in the mid-1920s where he coached and refereed for several seasons. He had been in poor health for "many years past, owing to having been gassed while in France. He [was] survived by his widow and two young children".

== Western Suburbs tour ==
The 1934 New South Wales champions Western Suburbs club from Sydney decided to tour New Zealand in September/October. Due to the unavailability of a player they strengthened their side with the addition of stocky halfback Percy Williams of South Sydney who was also the New South Wales halfback at the time, and Jack Lynch of Eastern Suburbs. Williams proved to be an important acquisition as he scored two tries and kicked nine goals during the tour. Their first match was with Marist where they won, this was followed by a draw with Newton, a loss to Richmond, a win over a Ponsonby XIII, and another loss in the return match with Richmond. They were the fifth Australian club to visit New Zealand following on from visits by University, South Sydney, Eastern Suburbs, and St George. They arrived on board the Mariposa Ship on 22 September before commencing a light training run. Four regular first grade players were unable to make the trip but the manager Mr. J. J. White said the side was strengthened by four substitutes "who, in the opinion of State selectors, with the ten regular, brought the tourists well up to full strength". Just prior to the fourth match with Ponsonby a fire broke out at the Nicholls Brothers Limited premise on Stanley Street with the building being extensively damaged. The boys who played in the curtain-raiser ran from the field to collect their clothes from the dressing shed as they feared the fire may spread to the sheds and offices of Auckland Rugby League. Like many teams who toured New Zealand they spent the last part of their trip touring the Rotorua area taking in the thermal attractions. By defeating the touring side Richmond won the Rangatira Shield for the Sydney-Auckland championship.

=== Tour matches ===
| 22 September | Marist | 19–21 | Western Suburbs | Carlaw Park 1 |
| 3:00 | Try: Bill Glover, Hec Brisbane, S.R. Smith 2, Robert Grotte; Con: Norm Campbell 2 | | Try: Alan Ridley, Percy Williams, Ron Knight, Vince Sheehan, Frank Sponberg; Con: Percy Williams 3 | Referee: Maurice Wetherill |

| 26 September | Newton | 10–10 | Western Suburbs | Carlaw Park 1 |
| 3:00 | Try: Mortimer Stephens 2 Pen: Hugh Brady 2 | | Try: Ray Hines, Alan Blake; Con: Percy Williams; Drop: Jim Sharman | Referee: Percy Rogers |

| 29 September | Richmond | 18–16 | Western Suburbs | Carlaw Park 1 |
| 3:00 | Try: Ernie McNeil 2, Harold Tetley, Roy Powell; Con: Cliff Satherley, Eric Fletcher 2 | | Try: Alan Ridley, Jack McConnell, Stan Tancred, Vic Hey; Con: Percy Williams; Drop: Jim Sharman | Attendance: 15,000; Referee: Percy Rogers |

The Ponsonby side was strengthened by the inclusion of Albert Laing (North Shore), Roy Hardgrave (Mount Albert), Des Herring (Mount Albert), and John Donald (North Shore). While Jack Lynch of the Eastern Suburbs side played his first tour match for Western Suburbs and scored a try in their win.

| 3 October | Ponsonby XIII | 13–26 | Western Suburbs | Carlaw Park 1 |
| 3:30 | Try: Brian Riley, Arthur Kay, Roy Hardgrave; Con: Albert Laing, R Jones | | Try: Percy Williams, Jack Lynch, Max Gray 2, Ron Knight, Frank Sponberg; Con: Percy Williams 3 Pen: Percy Williams | Referee: Maurice Wetherill |

| 6 October | Richmond | 10–3 | Western Suburbs | Carlaw Park 1 |
| 3:30 | Try: Harold Tetley, Ray Lawless; Con: Bert Cooke; Pen: Bert Cooke | | Try: Ray Hines | Attendance: 13,000; Referee: Percy Rogers |

== Fox Memorial Shield (senior championship) ==
=== Fox Memorial standings ===
| Team | Pld | W | D | L | F | A | Pts |
|---|---|---|---|---|---|---|---|
| Richmond Rovers | 13 | 11 | 0 | 2 | 257 | 108 | 22 |
| Newton Rangers | 13 | 8 | 0 | 5 | 167 | 110 | 16 |
| Ponsonby United | 13 | 7 | 0 | 6 | 139 | 142 | 14 |
| Devonport United | 13 | 5 | 1 | 7 | 100 | 130 | 11 |
| City Rovers | 13 | 4 | 0 | 9 | 145 | 246 | 8 |
| Marist Old Boys | 13 | 3 | 1 | 9 | 126 | 197 | 7 |

=== Fox Memorial fixtures ===
The new grandstand at Carlaw Park was opened on 12 May along with the Round 3 matches in front of an enormous attendance of 17,000.

It was decided after Round 13 to cease the championship and crown Richmond champions as they were 6 points clear and embarking on a southern tour rendering any further matches meaningless in terms of deciding the title.

=== Round 1 ===
Cyril Blacklaws of Newton Rangers received concussion and facial injuries and was taken to Auckland Hospital in a St John's ambulance but his condition was said to be not serious. Charles Allen of Newton was ordered off for kicking a Richmond Rovers player and was suspended for two playing Saturday's. Ross Sellars the Newton wing left the field injured and it was reported 5 weeks later in The New Zealand Herald that he was still in hospital recovering from his injury. The insurance committee reported earlier that Blacklaws and Sellars would indeed be in Auckland Hospital for a prolonged period but that both players "were to be covered by insurance". Frank Halloran debuted for the Ponsonby side after transferring from the champion Northcote 3rd grade intermediate team where he was captain. Walter (Wally) Stockton and John Stockton also transferred from the same team to Ponsonby. Māori player Bob (Robert) White scored a try and kicked a conversion in City's win over Devonport. He was the younger brother of Charlie White, with both players joining Marist the previous season from Northland. Bob would go on to play in the Hawkes Bay and Northland at both rugby and rugby league over the following seasons. Bill Turei scored two tries for them and also kicked a conversion.

| 28 April | City | 13–7 | Devonport | Carlaw Park 1 |
| 3:00 | Try: Bill Turei 2, Bob White; Con: Bill Turei, Bob White | | Try: Horace Hunt; Pen: Albert Laing, George Radonich | Referee: Percy Rogers |

| 28 April | Richmond | 18–7 | Newton | Carlaw Park 1 |
| 1:30 | Try: Ernest McNeil 2, Ted Mincham, Stan Prentice; Con: Ted Mincham 2 Pen: Ted Mincham | | Try: Maurice Quirke; Con: Cyril Blacklaws; Pen: Cyril Blacklaws | Referee: Maurice Wetherill |

| 28 April | Ponsonby | 28–8 | Marist | Carlaw Park 2 |
| 3:00 | Try: George Whye, S Shearer, John Stockley, Brian Riley, Ivan Littlewood, Arthur Kay; Con: R Jones 4 Pen: R Jones | | Try: Des Herring, James Everson; Pen: Daniel Keane | Referee: Stuart Billman |

=== Round 2 ===
Herbert Thompson of Devonport was concussed when he collided with another player. He was taken to Auckland Hospital in an ambulance but his condition was said to be not serious. The solitary try that City scored pushed them past the 4,000 point mark in all senior A championship games stretching back to 1910. They were the first club to achieve this feat. Ponsonby recorded their first win against Devonport since the semi final of the Roope Rooster in 1930.

| 5 May | Ponsonby | 17–2 | Devonport | Carlaw Park 1 |
| 3:00 | Try: Doug McLeay, S Shearer, Arthur Kay, Ivan Littlewood, Lou Hutt; Con: R Jones | | Try: George Radonich | Referee: Maurice Wetherill |

| 5 May | Newton | 32–3 | City | Carlaw Park 1 |
| 1:30 | Try: A Pope 3, Trevor Hall 2, Mortimer Stephens 2, Ray Middleton; Con: Claude Dempsey 3 Pen: Claude Dempsey | | Try: Bill Turei | Referee: Frank Thompson |

| 5 May | Richmond | 29–3 | Marist | Carlaw Park 2 |
| 3:00 | Try: Ted Mincham 2, Stan Prentice, Ralph Jenkinson, Ernie McNeil, Pat Young, Bill Telford; Con: Ted Mincham 3, Cliff Satherley | | Try: Unknown x 1 | Referee: Percy Rogers |

=== Round 3 ===
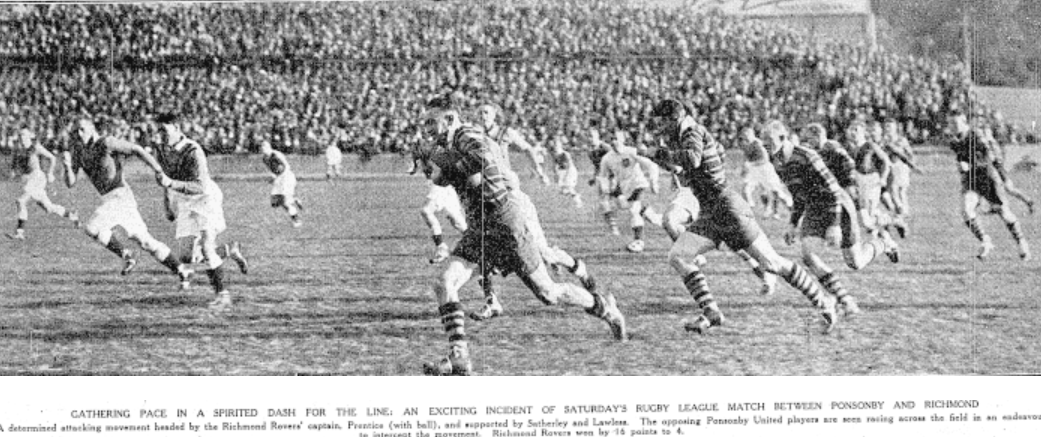
Stan Prentice running with the ball for Richmond before the 17,000 strong crowd.

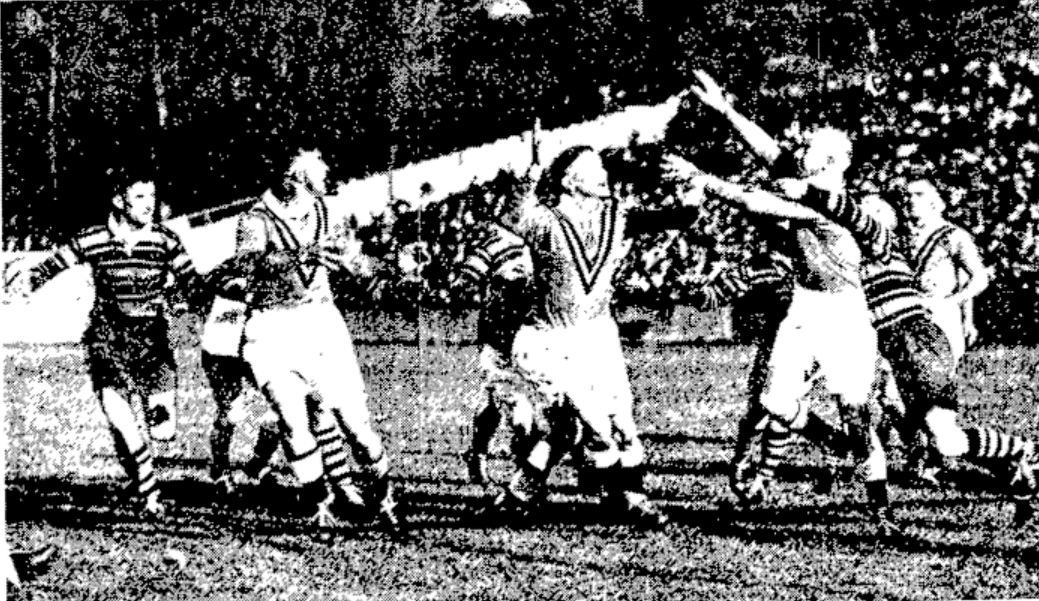
Doug McLeay (Ponsonby) passing the ball to George Whye (on the left).

The main match at Carlaw Park between Ponsonby and Richmond saw former New Zealand representatives Frank Delgrosso and Thomas (Scotty) McClymont up against each other as coaches for the respective teams. The match featured fourteen current or future New Zealand players with Harold Tetley on debut for Richmond scoring a try. For the third weekend in a row a player was concussed in a senior match at Carlaw Park and was taken by a St John's ambulance to Auckland Hospital. This time it was the turn of Devonport fullback, and ex-Kiwi Albert Laing. His condition that evening was said to be "satisfactory". The matches saw an enormous crowd of 17,000 in attendance which was a record for club games at Carlaw Park.

| 12 May | Richmond | 16–4 | Ponsonby | Carlaw Park 1 |
| 3:00 | Try: Bill Telford 2, Ray Lawless, Harold Tetley; Con: Ted Mincham 2 | | Pen: R Jones 2 | Attendance: 17,000; Referee: Percy Rogers |

| 12 May | City | 18–5 | Marist | Carlaw Park 1 |
| 1:30 | Try: Bill Turei, Nathan, Stan Clark, Cyril Wiberg; Con: Steve Watene 3 | | Try: Charles Dunne; Pen: Charles Dunne | Attendance: 17,000; Referee: Stuart Billman |

| 12 May | Newton | 18–8 | Devonport | Carlaw Park 2 |
| 1:30 | Try: Trevor Hall, Arnold Porteous, Henry Crook, Mortimer Stephens; Con: Claude Dempsey 3 | | Try: C Rhodes, Arthur Sowter; Con: Albert Laing | Attendance: 17,000; Referee: Maurice Wetherill |

=== Round 4 ===
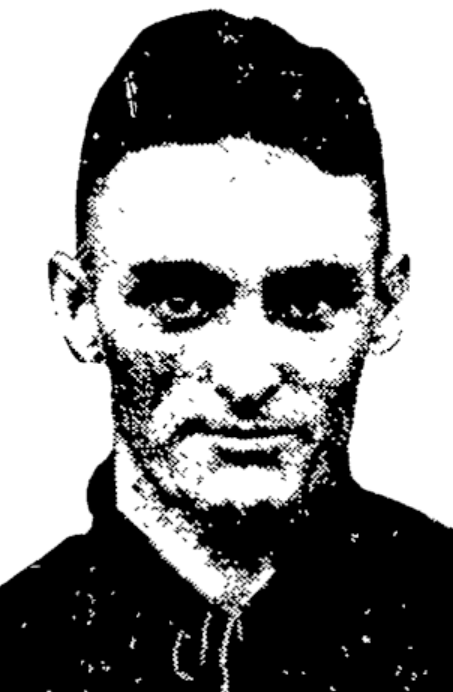
Ted Mincham

Early in the match between City and Richmond Puti Tipene (Steve) Watene (City) was concussed and carried off the field. Then their halfback, Vincent Axmann failed to take the field leaving them a player short as Watene was able to be replaced (by Hughes), Axmann could not be due to the second-half replacement rule. Their outstanding lock, William McLaughlin, came out of the scrum to fill in at halfback. For Richmond, Ted Mincham scored a hat trick as did Cliff Satherley. Mincham had recently returned to Auckland from Wellington where he played rugby for Poneke and rugby league for Celtic.

| 19 May | Richmond | 46–16 | City | Carlaw Park 1 |
| 3:00 | Try: Cliff Satherley 3, Ted Mincham 3, Ray Lawless 2, Ernie McNeil, Ralph Jenkinson, Harold Tetley, Tony Milicich; Con: Ted Mincham 3, Tony Milicich 2 | | Try: Bill Turei 2, Reginald Purdy, William McLaughlin; Con: Cyril Wiberg; Pen: Cyril Wiberg | Referee: Stuart Billman |

| 19 May | Ponsonby | 8–5 | Newton | Carlaw Park 1 |
| 1:30 | Try: Walter Stockley, Reginald Keesing; Con: R Jones | | Try: Ted Brimble; Pen: Claude Dempsey | Referee: Maurice Wetherill |

| 19 May | Marist | 16–10 | Devonport | Carlaw Park 1 |
| 1:30 | Try: John Schultz 2, Charlie White, S.R. Smith; Con: Norm Campbell 2 | | Try: Alf Smith 2 Con: Allan Seagar; Pen: George Radonich | Referee: Percy Rogers |

=== Round 5 ===
In Marist's loss to Newton they fielded three Schultz brothers. Len who had debuted for the club in 1931 returned after recovering from a broken collarbone but had plainly not got back to full fitness and had to leave the field with a shoulder injury in the first half. His brother Bert who had debuted in 1930 was on the opposite wing, while their younger brother John was at inside centre after having been promoted to the senior side this year.

| 26 May | Newton | 22–13 | Marist | Carlaw Park 1 |
| 3:00 | Try: Ted Brimble, Ray Middleton, Mortimer Stephens, Trevor Hall; Con: Claude Dempsey 4 Pen: Claude Dempsey | | Try: Wilf Hassan, Des Herring, Francis List; Con: Norm Campbell; Pen: Norm Campbell | Referee: Maurice Wetherill |

| 26 May | Richmond | 16–9 | Devonport | Carlaw Park 1 |
| 1:30 | Try: Ernie McNeil 3, Ted Mincham; Pen: Ted Mincham 2 | | Try: C Rhodes 2, Ted Scott | Referee: Percy Rogers |

| 26 May | Ponsonby | 18–4 | City | Carlaw Park 2 |
| 3:00 | Try: Arthur Kay, Brian Riley, Doug McLeay, Frank Halloran; Con: R Jones 3 | | Con: Bob White; Drop: Cyril Wiberg | Referee: Stuart Billman |

=== Round 6 ===
Robert Grotte

Hec Brisbane came out of retirement to lead a Marist side which had been struggling somewhat. He was to play until the end of the season and officially retire for good with a benefit match played for him in October. Eight of their players had refused to play after taking issue over the club's finances. The players were Des Herring, Gordon Campbell, Claude List, Wilf Hassan, Charles Dunn, and the Schultz brothers (Bert, Len, and John). Hassan then left the club and switched to Marist rugby club. Robert Grotte debuted at halfback for Marist in Hassan's place. The following year Grotte moved to Australia and played for the St George club side with 13 first grade games over three years before returning to Auckland. He debuted for New Zealand in 1938. Herbert Thompson was concussed for the second time in the season in his City side's match with Devonport, and taken to Auckland Hospital. One match was played on the Monday which was a public holiday between City and Devonport. In the match between Richmond and Newton, both McNeil and Ted Mincham went off injured for Richmond, then Ray Lawless and Reginald Kelsall were both sent off for fighting. Late in the match Ted Brimble must have broken his collarbone but it was not reported for several weeks with him missing 3 matches. Eric Midgley scored a try for Ponsonby. He was a former Auckland diving champion and had competed against Wilf Hassan.

| 2 June | Richmond | 3–2 | Newton | Carlaw Park 1 |
| 3:00 | Try: Bill Telford | | Pen: Claude Dempsey | Referee: Percy Rogers |

| 2 June | Ponsonby | 16–7 | Marist | Carlaw Park 1 |
| 1:30 | Try: Eric Midgley, Walter Stockley, Brian Riley, Doug McLeay; Con: R Jones 2 | | Try: Sidney Loader; Con: Norm Campbell; Pen: Daniel Keane | Referee: Maurice Wetherill |

| 4 June | Devonport | 18–15 | City | Carlaw Park 1 |
| 3:00 | Try: Bert Leatherbarrow 2, R O'Donnell, L Stevens; Con: Albert Laing 3 | | Try: Bob White, S Belsham, James Herring; Con: Cyril Wiberg 2 Pen: Steve Watene | Referee: Percy Rogers |

=== Round 7 ===
In the Carlaw Park crowd included the members of the jury for the ‘Bayly trial’ which some weeks later saw William Alfred Bayly convicted of murdering 2 of his neighbours. He was hung at Mt Eden Prison on 20 July. The jury were frequently taken on excursions during breaks in the trial which lasted several weeks.

| 9 June | Devonport | 10–0 | Ponsonby | Carlaw Park 1 |
| 3:00 | Try: George Radonich, Bert Leatherbarrow; Con: Albert Laing 2 | | | Referee: Stuart Billman |

| 9 June | Richmond | 20–8 | Marist | Carlaw Park 1 |
| 1:30 | Try: Bert Cooke 2, Alf Mitchell, Harold Tetley, Ralph Jenkinson, Cliff Satherley; Con: Tony Milicich | | Try: Sidney Loader, John Bakalich; Pen: Norm Campbell | Referee: Les Bull |

| 9 June | Newton | 16–9 | City | Carlaw Park 2 |
| 1:30 | Try: Mortimer Stephens 2, Trevor Hall 2 Con: Claude Dempsey; Pen: Claude Dempsey | | Try: Harry Wayne, Bob White, Bill Turei | Referee: Percy Rogers |

=== Round 8 ===
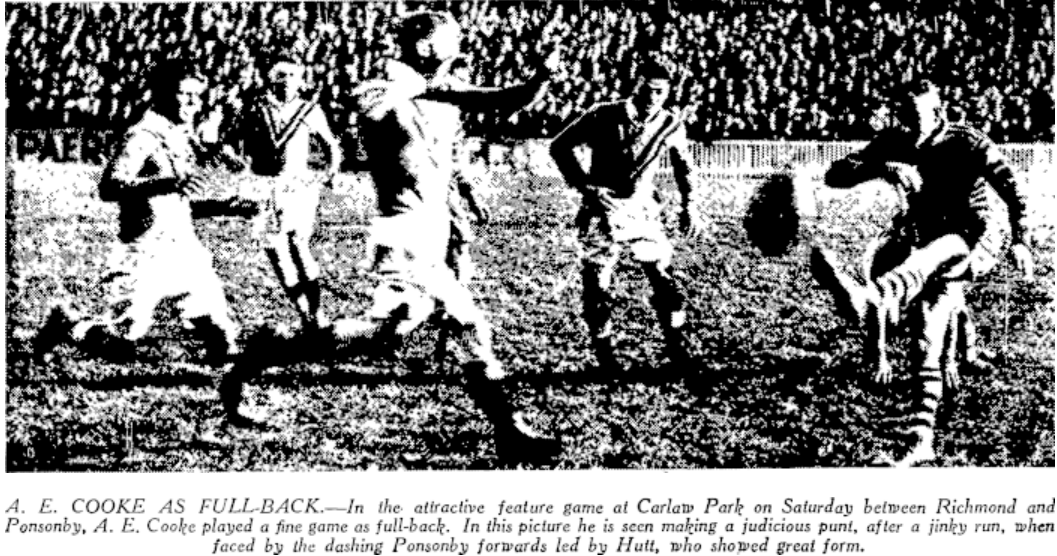
Bert Cooke punting the ball for Richmond in their 26–10 win over Ponsonby.

Richmond comfortably beat Ponsonby in the main match with past and future New Zealand internationals Alf Mitchell, Ted Mincham, and Cliff Satherley scoring tries for the victors. For Ponsonby their New Zealand international Arthur Kay scored twice. For Devonport their player/coach, Allan Seagar scored one of their tries in their 10–6 win over Newton, while Norm Campbell kicked 5 goals for Marist in their 22–13 win over Newton.

| 16 June | Richmond | 26–10 | Ponsonby | Carlaw Park 1 |
| 3:00 | Try: Alf Mitchell 2, Ralph Jenkinson, Ted Mincham (obstruction try), Cliff Satherley, Verrall; Con: Ted Mincham 2 Pen: Ted Mincham 2 | | Try: Arthur Kay 2 Con: Eric Midgley; Pen: Walter Stockley | Referee: Maurice Wetherill |

| 16 June | Devonport | 10–6 | Newton | Carlaw Park 1 |
| 1:30 | Try: Allan Seagar, Bert Leatherbarrow; Con: Albert Laing; Pen: Albert Laing | | Try: Trevor Hall, Mortimer Stephens | Referee: Percy Rogers |

| 16 June | Marist | 22–13 | City | Carlaw Park 1 |
| 3:00 | Try: Daniel Keane, Jim Laird, Sidney Loader, Fraser Webberley; Con: Norm Campbell 4 Pen: Norm Campbell | | Try: Bill Turei 2, D Nathan; Con: Steve Watene 2 | Referee: Stuart Billman |

=== Round 9 ===
Hugh Brady, a Glenora junior played for Newton seniors and scored two tries in their 12–11 win. The Glenora club protested the move, however as he was 'financial' then he was allowed to play in the higher senior grade on a two match trial. Glenora did not have a first grade side. He was subsequently granted a transfer during the week. Lou Hutt playing loose forward for Ponsonby scored two tries for the losing side. Richmond thrashed City 43–13 after leading 32–3 at half time. Alf Mitchell and Ray Lawless both scored hat tricks for Richmond.

| 23 June | Newton | 12–11 | Ponsonby | Carlaw Park 1 |
| 3:00 | Try: Hugh Brady 2 Con: Claude Dempsey; Pen: Cyril Blacklaws 2 | | Try: Lou Hutt 2, Selwyn Davis; Con: R Jones | Referee: Percy Rogers |

| 23 June | Marist | 8–8 | Devonport | Carlaw Park 1 |
| 1:30 | Try: John Bakalich, Hec Brisbane; Pen: Norm Campbell | | Try: Cliff Hall 2 Pen: Albert Laing | Referee: Stuart Billman |

| 23 June | Richmond | 43–14 | City | Carlaw Park 2 |
| 3:00 | Try: Alf Mitchell 3, Ray Lawless 3, Ernie McNeil, Roy Powell, Stan Prentice, Bill Telford, Ted Mincham; Con: Ted Mincham 4 Pen: Ted Mincham | | Try: Harry Wayne 2, Bob White; Con: Robert Purdy, Puti Tipene Watene | Referee: Maurice Wetherill |

=== Round 10 ===
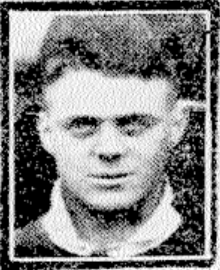
Roy Hardgrave (Newton)

Round 10 saw the return of Roy Hardgrave to the Newton side after playing 212 games for St Helens in England from 1929 to early 1934 where he scored 173 tries. He had played 55 games for Newton from 1924 to 1929 scoring 38 tries. Hardgrave later played for York and then Toulouse before returning to New Zealand once more where he joined Mount Albert. The main game at Carlaw park between Devonport and Richmond saw no tries scored in very wet conditions with both teams completely covered in mud by the end. Devonport winning thanks to Albert Laing kicking two penalties while Richmond could only replay with one penalty to Cliff Satherley.

| 7 July | Devonport | 4–2 | Richmond | Carlaw Park 1 |
| 3:00 | Pen: Albert Laing 2 | | Pen: Cliff Satherley | Referee: Percy Rogers |

| 7 July | Newton | 9–8 | Marist | Carlaw Park 1 |
| 1:30 | Try: Trevor Hall, Ted Brimble, Mortimer Stephens | | Try: S.R. Smith, Jim Laird; Con: Norm Campbell | Referee: Stuart Billman |

| 7 July | City | 22–10 | Ponsonby | Carlaw Park 2 |
| 3:00 | Try: Joseph Ragg 2, Cyril Wiberg, James Herring, Harry Wayne, Bill Turei; Con: Cyril Wiberg, A Nathan | | Try: Arthur Kay, S Shearer; Con: Walter Stockley; Pen: R Jones | Referee: Maurice Wetherill |

=== Round 11 ===
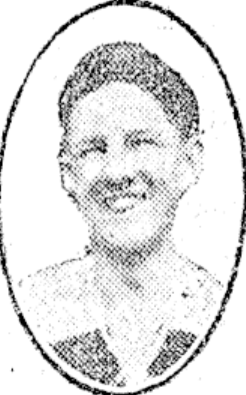
Eric Fletcher debuted for Richmond. He became Kiwi #239 the following year.

Eric Fletcher debuted for Richmond at inside centre. He had previously played rugby union for Manawatu and one game for Auckland in 1932. He went on to represent Auckland at rugby league twice in 1935 and New Zealand once in the same season. In 1936 he moved back to the Manawatu region and resumed his rugby union career as well as playing cricket and golf to high levels. In the meantime his younger brother Keith moved to Auckland and played for Richmond from 1936 to 1939. Ernie McNeil was concussed in Richmonds loss to Newton and taken to Auckland Hospital but his condition was not serious. Alf Mitchell of Richmond was also concussed for Richmond though he did not go to hospital until Sunday morning. For Newton their hooker, Maurice Quirke hooked well in the scrums and scored two tries. The match between Ponsonby and Marist was played at the Onehunga Recreation Ground and saw Ponsonby win 11–7.

| 14 July | Newton | 11–7 | Richmond | Carlaw Park 1 |
| 3:00 | Try: Maurice S Quirke 2, Mortimer Stephens; Con: Claude Dempsey | | Try: Roy Powell; Con: Cliff Satherley; Pen: Cliff Satherley | Referee: Les Bull |

| 14 July | City | 13–2 | Devonport | Carlaw Park 1 |
| 1:30 | Try: Harry Wayne, Bill Turei, R Purdy; Con: Cyril Wiberg; Pen: Cyril Wiberg | | Pen: Albert Laing | Referee: Maurice Wetherill |

| 14 July | Ponsonby | 11–7 | Marist | Onehunga Recreation Ground |
| 3:00 | Try: Selwyn Davis, Walter Stockley, Arthur Kay; Con: R Jones | | Try: Hec Brisbane; Con: Norm Campbell; Pen: Norm Campbell | Referee: Stuart Billman |

=== Round 12 ===
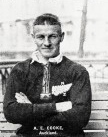
Richmond back, Bert Cooke in 1924 as an All Black.

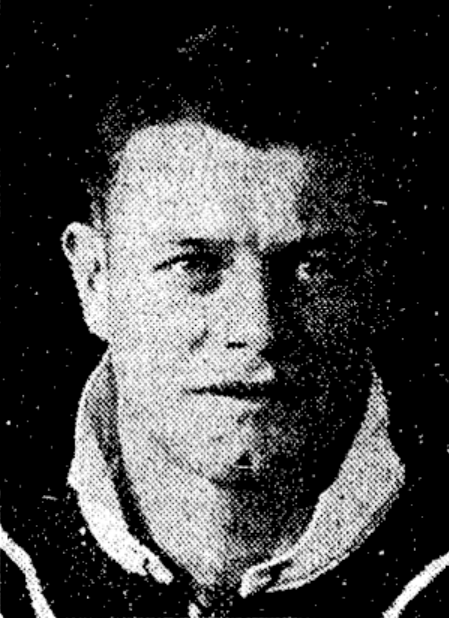
Richmond back Jack Satherley who later represented New Zealand as a hooker.

In the match between Ponsonby and Devonport, Trevor O'Leary made his first appearance for Devonport in 2 1/2 years after playing for them 44 times from 1928 to 1931. In Richmond's win over Marist Bert Cooke scored a try and kicked a conversion and a penalty. He began the game at fullback but with Richmond's attack struggling he switched places with Jack Satherley in the five eighths and thereafter the Richmond attack functioned much better. Satherley would later go on to represent New Zealand, but in the position of hooker when he made a full time switch there in 1935. Earlier in the game Richmond winger Ted Mincham was taken off with a leg injury and was replaced by Swanberg who played well in his place. It was reported that Roy Hardgrave did not want to play for Newton which caused some controversy and he then moved to the Mount Albert club where he played two games before being signed by York and moving back to England to continue his professional career. He played 89 games for them across four seasons scoring 52 tries. He then spent time at Toulouse in 1938 before returning to finish his career at Mount Albert.

| 21 July | Newton | 17–5 | City | Carlaw Park 1 |
| 3:00 | Try: Mortimer Stephens 2, Arnold Porteous, Hugh Brady, Ted Brimble; Con: Claude Dempsey | | Try: Stan Clark; Con: Steve Watene | Referee: Maurice Wetherill |

| 21 July | Ponsonby | 6–5 | Devonport | Carlaw Park 1 |
| 1:30 | Try: S. Shearer, Walter Stockley | | Try: Ted Scott; Con: Allan Seagar | Referee: Percy Rogers |

| 21 July | Richmond | 13–10 | Marist | Carlaw Park 2 |
| 3:00 | Try: Ralph Bennett, Bert Cooke, Ralph Jenkinson; Con: Bert Cooke; Pen: Bert Cooke | | Try: Alan Clarke, S.R. Smith; Con: Norm Campbell; Pen: Norm Campbell | Referee: Stuart Billman |

=== Round 13 ===
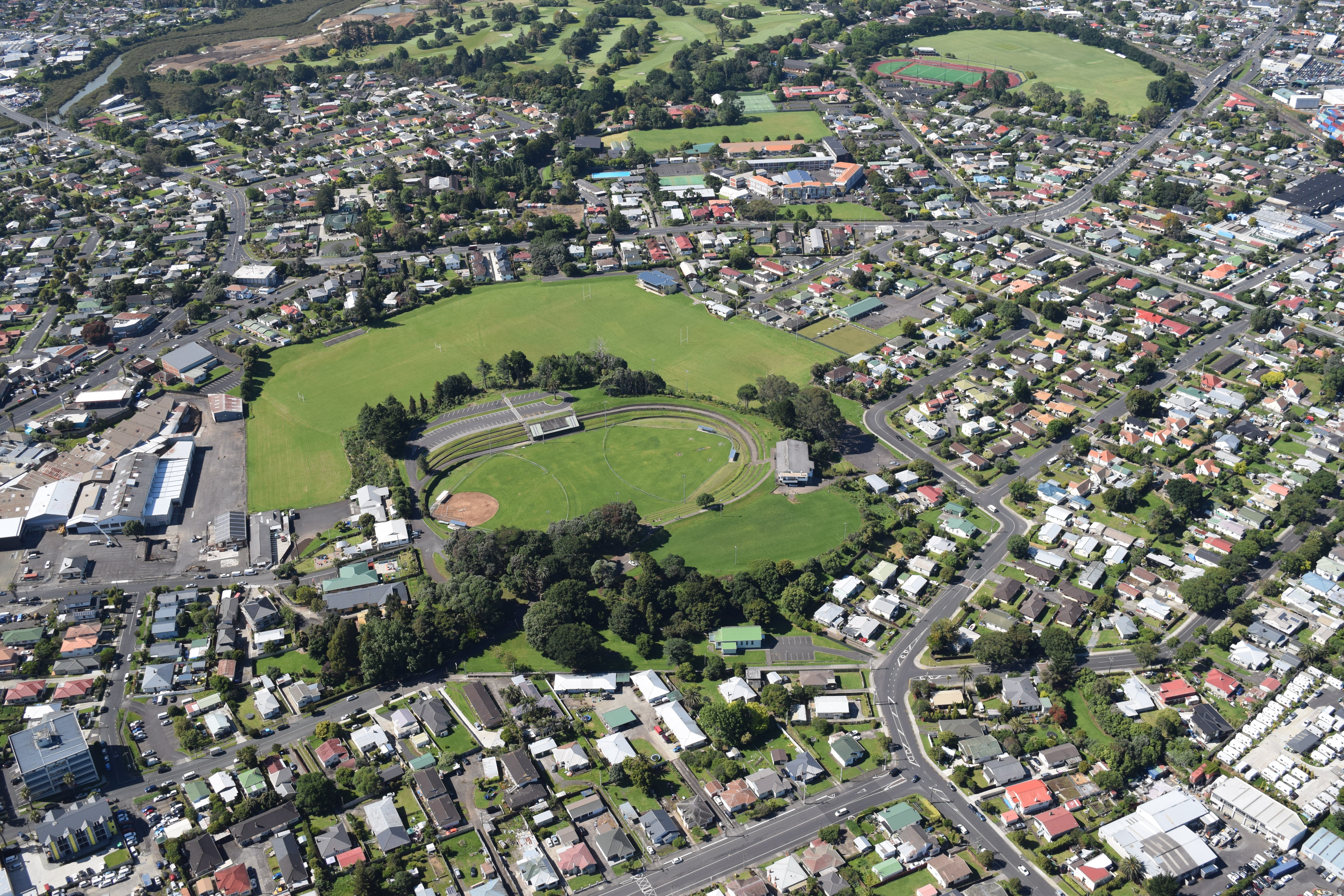
Sturges Park in Otahuhu where Marist played City. The field is in the enclosed oval area.

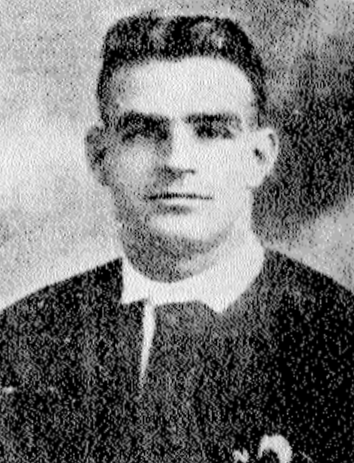
Lou Brown who was in attendance for the matches at Carlaw Park.

With Richmond's 18–0 victory over Ponsonby they were now an unassailable 6 points clear of second with only two matches left in the championship. As a result, the Auckland Rugby League decided to cease the competition at this point and begin the Roope Rooster knockout competition. It was Richmond's first ever first grade championship and the centre piece of a golden era in their club history. Newton Rangers were undermanned in their match with Devonport with Trevor Hall and Ted Brimble both out suffering from influenza while Claude Dempsey was absent due to the passing of his father. Schlesinger was also absent and Roy Hardgrave was also unavailable by choice. Lou Brown, the former Newton and City player who had been playing professionally in England for Wigan (1927–30), Halifax (1930–31), and York (1931–34) was in attendance in the crowd and "received a hearty welcome". He played for City 31 times over the following two seasons before returning to Europe to play for the Bordeaux club in the 1938–39 season. The Marist - City game was played at Sturges Park in Otahuhu. It was the second year that a "charge game" had been played in Otahuhu to raise money for rugby league in the area. Unfortunately the weather was described as "wretched" with driving rain and a "stiff breeze" with only around 50 spectators were in attendance. The area was rural at the time unlike today. Marist won 11–0 with Norm Campbell kicking a conversion. Campbell had begun his football career playing rugby union for Otahuhu in 1927 before switching to rugby league where he played for Otahuhu in 1928 before joining Marist in 1929 and going on to play 104 times for them scoring 175 points over eight seasons. He was one of the best fullbacks in Auckland through that time and was selected 11 times for Auckland and played one test match for New Zealand in 1932.

| 4 August | Richmond | 18–0 | Ponsonby | Carlaw Park 1 |
| 3:00 | Try: Ted Mincham, Roy Powell, Ralph Jenkinson 2 Con: Cliff Satherley 2 Pen: Cliff Satherley | | | Referee: Stuart Billman |

| 4 August | Devonport | 7–0 | Newton | Carlaw Park 1 |
| 1:30 | Try: Alf Smith; Con: Albert Laing; Pen: Albert Laing | | | Referee: Percy Rogers |

| 4 August | Marist | 11–0 | City | Sturges Park, Otahuhu |
| 3:00 | Try: Hec Brisbane, Jim Laird, Smith; Con: Norm Campbell | | | Referee: Maurice Wetherill |

=== Roope Rooster knockout competition ===
History was made for the Mt Albert and Papakura clubs when they entered the Roope Rooster competition. It was their first time playing in a first grade senior competition. Watson, a promoted 3rd intermediate player was Papakura's first ever senior competition scorer when he crossed in the second half. Roy Hardgrave and several other Newton players controversially transferred to the new Mount Albert club. He had refused to play after being told by the selector to play in the centres, away from his usual position on the wing. Hardgrave was worried it might make it difficult for him to gain another contract in England if he couldn't maintain form in that position. The selector said it was his right to position players. it caused a dispute amount the Newton board with several of them resigning and Hardgrave and other transferring. Hardgrave made his debut for Mount Albert in their Roope Rooster match. The Mount Albert side also featured several of the suspended Marist players who were eventually granted transfers including the Schultz brothers, Des Herring, and Claude List.

==== Round 1 ====
The Ponsonby - Mt Albert match needed extra time after the scores were tied at 8–8 at full time. Five minutes each way were played with Ponsonby scoring 8 points in that time.

| 18 August | City | 14–9 | Newton | Carlaw Park 1 |
| 1:30 | Try: Vincent Axmann, James Herring; Con: Steve Watene 2 Pen: Steve Watene; Drop: Cyril Wiberg | | Try: Hugh Brady 2, Mortimer Stephens | Referee: Percy Rogers |

| 18 August | Ponsonby | 19–11 | Mt Albert | Carlaw Park 2 |
| 1:30 | Try: Doug McLeay 2, R Jones, Lou Hutt, John Graham Worskey; Con: R Jones 2 | | Try: Bert Schultz 2, Roy Hardgrave; Con: Des Herring | Referee: Stuart Billman |

| 18 August | Richmond | 26–5 | Devonport | Carlaw Park 1 |
| 3:00 | Try: Eric Fletcher 2, Stan Prentice, Cliff Satherley 2, Tony Milicich; Con: Cliff Satherley 4 | | Try: Newton; Pen: Albert Laing | Referee: Maurice Wetherill |

| 18 August | Marist | 6–3 | Papakura | Carlaw Park 2 |
| 3:00 | Pen: Norm Campbell 3 | | Try: Watson | Referee: Roy Otto |

==== Semi finals ====
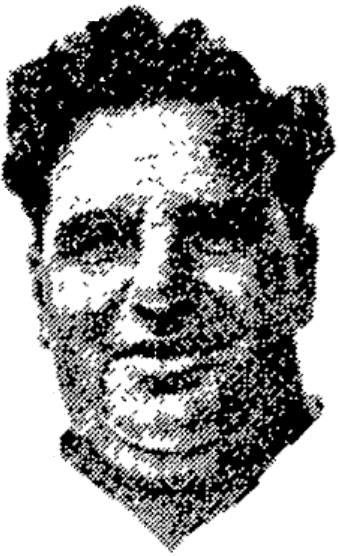
Arthur Lennie (Richmond)

Arthur Lennie played his last ever senior game for Richmond. It was in fact his only first grade match of the season. The hooker had debuted for Richond seniors in 1927 and finished with 56 senior games and three tries across eight seasons and had also played for them for four years as a junior. Lennie then went on to referee rugby league for five seasons including four senior grade games and then became one of the best lawn bowlers in Auckland post retirement.

| 25 August | Richmond | 21–13 | Ponsonby | Carlaw Park 1 |
| 3:00 | Try: Cliff Satherley, Stan Prentice, Jack Satherley 2, Bill Telford; Con: Cliff Satherley 2, Eric Fletcher | | Try: Lou Hutt, Rush, John Whorskey; Con: R Jones 2 | Referee: Stuart Billman |

| 25 August | Marist | 15–12 | City | Carlaw Park 1 |
| 1:30 | Try: Alan Clarke, John Bakalich 2, Hec Brisbane, Arthur Furlonger | | Try: Stan Clark, Reginald Purdy; Con: Cyril Wiberg 2 Pen: Cyril Wiberg | Referee: Maurice Wetherill |

==== Final ====
Joseph Ginders hooked for Richmond in their victory. He had weeks earlier come to Auckland with the South Island team. During the match Ralph Jenkinson, another Richmond forward, broke his nose but it was not discovered until it was examined after the match. Richmond's New Zealand representatives dominated their scoring with Ray Lawless, Eric Fletcher, and Jack Satherley scoring tries, with Bert Cooke kicking 2 goals and Cliff Satherley likewise. Alf Broadhead added their other try.

| 8 September | Richmond | 20–13 | Marist | Carlaw Park 1 |
| 3:00 | Try: Jack Satherley, Eric Fletcher, Alfred Broadhead, Ray Lawless; Con: Cliff Satherley 2, Bert Cooke; Pen: Bert Cooke | | Try: Alan Clarke, Sidney Loader, John Bakalich; Con: Norm Campbell 2 | Referee: Percy Rogers |

=== Phelan Shield ===
1934 was the first year in which the Phelan Shield had been played for by senior teams. The four losing teams from round one of the Roope Rooster competition were pitted against each other with Newton Rangers becoming the inaugural Phelan Shield champions.

==== Round 1 ====
| 25 August | Devonport | 13–6 | Papakura | Carlaw Park 2 |
| 3:00 | Try: L Stevens, Alf Smith, Horace Hunt; Pen: Albert Laing | | Try: Ross, Wilson | Referee: Wilfred Simpson |

| 25 August | Newton | 7–3 | Mt Albert | Carlaw Park 2 |
| 1:30 | Try: Trevor Hall; Con: Hugh Brady; Pen: Hugh Brady | | Try: John Schultz | Referee: Percy Rogers |

==== Semi finals ====
| 1 September | Newton | 11–8 | Devonport | Carlaw Park 1 |
| 1:30 | Try: Cameron 3 Con: Cyril Blacklaws | | Try: Horace Hunt, Millar; Con: Albert Laing | Referee: Stuart Billman |

| 1 September | Ponsonby | 13–12 | City | Carlaw Park 2 |
| 1:30 | Try: Arthur Kay, Reginald Keesing, S Shearer; Con: R Jones 2 | | Try: Reginald Johnson, J Saunders; Con: Cyril Wiberg 2 Pen: Cyril Wiberg | Referee: S Fisher |

==== Final ====
The new young fullback for Ponsonby, Lewis, was unavailable to play and coach Frank Delgrosso returned to play in the position but struggled due to the pace of the game and his lack of fitness. For Newton Ted Brimble and Cameron partnered well in the five eighths and each scored a try.

| 8 September | Newton | 18–10 | Ponsonby | Carlaw Park 2 |
| 3:00 | Try: Ted Brimble, Trevor Hall, Hugh Brady, Cameron; Con: Claude Dempsey 2, Cyril Blacklaws | | Try: Arthur Kay, John Stockley; Con: R Jones 2 | Referee: Wilfred Simpson |

=== Stormont Shield ===
Richmond Rovers made history by becoming the first team in Auckland Rugby League to win the Fox Memorial, Roope Rooster, and Stormont Shield in the same season. The 'treble crown' had gone unachieved since 1925 when all three trophies first became available for first grade sides. Bert Cooke scored two tries for the winners. He started at fullback but moved to centre in the second half, with one try coming after Ernie McNeil streaked down the terrace side of the field and found Cooke with an in-pass who outpaced Henry Crook to race 40 yards for the try. Newton were unlucky in that they lost fullback Claude Dempsey to injury in the first half and he was replaced by Francis a young convert to rugby league from the Training College seniors from 1933. Then in the second half their halfback, Arnold Porteous also had to leave with an injury.

| 13 October | Richmond | 21–5 | Newton | Carlaw Park 1 |
| 3:00 | Try: Bert Cooke 2, Harold Tetley, Bill Telford, Ernie McNeil; Con: Cliff Satherley 3 | | Try: Ted Brimble; Con: C Brady | Referee: Wilfred Simpson |

=== Top Try Scorers and Point Scorers ===
The point scoring lists are compiled from matches played in the Fox Memorial, Roope Rooster and Phelan Shield matches which involved all first grade sides.

Top try scorers
| Rk | Player | Team | Games | Tries |
|---|---|---|---|---|
| 1 | Mortimer Stephens | Newton | 17 | 12 |
| 2 | Bill Turei | City | 15 | 11 |
| 3= | Trevor Hall | Newton | 17 | 10 |
| 3= | Ted Mincham | Richmond | 16 | 10 |
| 5= | Arthur Kay | Ponsonby | 17 | 9 |
| 5= | Ernie McNeil | Richmond | 16 | 9 |
| 7 | Cliff Satherley | Richmond | 16 | 8 |
| 8= | Ralph Jenkinson | Richmond | 14 | 7 |
| 8= | Bill Telford | Richmond | 17 | 7 |
| 10 | Ray Lawless | Richmond | 16 | 7 |

Top point scorers
| Rk | Player | Team | G | T | C | P | DG | Pts |
|---|---|---|---|---|---|---|---|---|
| 1 | Ted Mincham | Richmond | 16 | 10 | 16 | 6 | 0 | 74 |
| 2 | Cliff Satherley | Richmond | 16 | 8 | 15 | 3 | 0 | 60 |
| 3 | R Jones | Ponsonby | 16 | 1 | 21 | 4 | 0 | 53 |
| 4 | Norm Campbell | Marist | 15 | 0 | 14 | 9 | 0 | 46 |
| 5 | Claude Dempsey | Newton | 15 | 0 | 16 | 5 | 0 | 42 |
| 6= | Mortimer Stephens | Newton | 17 | 12 | 0 | 0 | 0 | 36 |
| 6= | Cyril Wiberg | City | 16 | 2 | 9 | 4 | 2 | 36 |
| 8 | Bill Turei | City | 15 | 11 | 1 | 0 | 0 | 35 |
| 9 | Albert Laing | Devonport | 13 | 0 | 8 | 9 | 0 | 34 |
| 10 | Trevor Hall | Newton | 17 | 10 | 0 | 0 | 0 | 30 |

=== Richmond Rovers tour matches ===
Richmond Rovers embarked on a 2 match tour of Taranaki and Hawke's Bay. Jack Redwood traveled as their manager. They had made endeavours to travel to Otago and asked for 50 pounds to cover their expenses. They were told by Otago that if they were willing to play a match on a Wednesday before or after their visit to the West Coast they would be "pleased to arrange a game". The West Coast rugby league guaranteed 60 percent of any gate takings to Richmond if they chose to tour. Ultimately they only played the two North Island matches. In their match against Taranaki they lost to a goal kicked after full-time. During the match against Hawke's Bay the referee (H.J. Fulford) collided with Stan Prentice and received a bad cut above his eye requiring attention from St John's before the match could continue.

| 9 August | Taranaki | 23–22 | Richmond | Western Park, New Plymouth |
| 2:30 | Try: Cliff Hunt 2, R McDonald, Lex Lewis, Ray Arnold; Con: Ray Arnold 2 Pen: Ray Arnold; Drop: R Priar | | Try: Bert Cooke 2, Alf Broadhead, Ernie McNeil, Harold Tetley, Ray Lawless; Con: Cliff Satherley, Tony Milicich |

| 11 August | Hawke’s Bay | 11–37 | Richmond | Farndon Park (Clive Domain), Clive, Hawkes Bay |
| | Try: Ned Staples; Con: "Moug" Smith; Pen: "Moug" Smith 3 | | Try: Bill Telford 3, Alf Broadhead, Roy Powell, Ted Mincham 2, Tony Milicich, Bert Cooke; Con: Cliff Satherley 2, Eric Fletcher 3 | Attendance: 2,000; Referee: H.J. Fulford |

=== Devonport tour ===
While it was described as a 'Northern Tour' in the newspapers it actually only involved one match with the Northland side in Hikurangi. Rugby league in Northland was in its early years and to help promote the code there Auckland sides had traveled there to play exhibition matches and in this case to play the local representative side. Devonport proved too strong winning 17–11 though Northland were missing Bowyer, Vause, and Cunningham from their regular side.

| 15 September | Northland | 11–17 | Devonport | Hikurangi Domain, Hikurangi |
| | Try: Bob White 3 Con: Claude Hamilton | | Try: Hugh Simpson, Ted Scott, Horace Hunt; Con: Albert Laing 3 Pen: Albert Laing | Referee: Hill |

== Senior reserve competition (Norton Cup) ==
The senior reserve grade competition was in its fourth season and was won by the Richmond Rovers club for the third consecutive year.

=== Norton Cup standings ===
It appears that the Round 13 match between Devonport and Newton, and the Round 14 match between Devonport and Marist were not played as it was not reported in the newspapers and the published points tables showed those teams had played less matches.

| Team | Pld | W | D | L | F | A | Pts |
|---|---|---|---|---|---|---|---|
| Richmond Rovers Reserves | 14 | 12 | 0 | 2 | 208 | 128 | 24 |
| City Rovers Reserves | 14 | 10 | 1 | 3 | 121 | 93 | 21 |
| Marist Old Boys Reserves | 13 | 5 | 1 | 7 | 129 | 110 | 11 |
| Ponsonby United Reserves | 14 | 3 | 3 | 8 | 82 | 139 | 9 |
| Devonport United Reserves | 12 | 4 | 0 | 8 | 81 | 138 | 8 |
| Newton Rangers Reserves | 13 | 3 | 1 | 9 | 50 | 128 | 7 |

=== Senior reserve (Norton Cup) results ===
| | Date | | Score | | Score | Venue |
| Round 1 | 28 April | Marist | 32 | Ponsonby | 11 | Carlaw Park # 2, 1:30pm |
| – | 28 April | City | 14 | Devonport | 5 | Auckland Domain, 3pm |
| – | 28 April | Newton | 11 | Richmond | 3 | Auckland Domain, 3pm |
| Round 2 | 5 May | Marist | 17 | Richmond | 10 | Carlaw Park # 2, 1:30pm |
| – | 5 May | Devonport | 17 | Ponsonby | 2 | Outer Domain, 1:30pm |
| – | 5 May | City | 8 | Newton | 2 | Outer Domain, 3pm |
| Round 3 | 12 May | Newton | 16 | Devonport | 9 | Carlaw Park # 2, 1:30pm |
| – | 12 May | City | 7 | Marist | 5 | Outer Domain, 3pm |
| – | 12 May | Richmond | 14 | Ponsonby | 0 | Outer Domain, 1:30pm |
| Round 4 | 19 May | Richmond | 26 | City | 2 | Auckland Domain, 1:30pm |
| – | 19 May | Ponsonby | 2 | Newton | 2 | Auckland Domain, 3pm |
| – | 19 May | Devonport | 10 | Marist | 6 | Carlaw Park # 2, 1:30pm |
| Round 5 | 26 May | City | 14 | Ponsonby | 8 | Carlaw Park # 2, 1:30pm |
| – | 26 May | Marist | 24 | Newton | 3 | Auckland Domain, 1:30pm |
| – | 26 May | Richmond | 23 | Devonport | 2 | Auckland Domain, 3pm |
| Round 6 | 2 June | Richmond | 38 | Newton | 3 | Carlaw Park # 2, 1:30pm |
| – | 2 June | Marist | 10 | Ponsonby | 3 | Carlaw Park # 2, 3pm |
| – | 4 June | City | 17 | Devonport | 2 | Carlaw Park # 1, 1:30pm |
| Round 7 | 9 June | City | 5 | Newton | 2 | Carlaw Park # 2, 1:30pm |
| – | 9 June | Ponsonby | 12 | Devonport | 5 | Auckland Domain, 1:30pm |
| – | 9 June | Richmond | 24 | Marist | 0 | Auckland Domain, 3pm |
| Round 8 | 16 June | City | 12 | Marist | 8 | Carlaw Park # 2, 1:30pm |
| – | 16 June | Richmond | 11 | Ponsonby | 3 | Auckland Domain, 1:30pm |
| – | 16 June | Devonport | 9 | Newton | 8 | Auckland Domain, 3pm |
| Round 9 | 23 June | Richmond | 7 | City | 4 | Carlaw Park # 2, 1:30pm |
| – | 23 June | Devonport | 9 | Marist | 6 | Auckland Domain, 3pm |
| – | 23 June | Newton | 3 | Ponsonby | 0 | Auckland Domain, 1:30pm |
| Round 10 | 7 July | Richmond | 13 | Devonport | 6 | Auckland Domain, 1:30pm |
| – | 7 July | Marist | 8 | Newton | 0 | Auckland Domain, 3pm |
| – | 7 July | City | 10 | Ponsonby | 10 | Carlaw Park # 2, 1:30pm |
| Round 11 | 14 July | Richmond | 14 | Newton | 0 | Auckland Domain # 2, 1:30pm |
| – | 14 July | City | 13 | Devonport | 7 | Carlaw Park # 2, 3pm |
| – | 14 July | Marist | 10 | Ponsonby | 10 | Auckland Domain # 2, 3pm |
| Round 12 | 21 July | Richmond | 6 | Marist | 0 | Carlaw Park # 2, 3pm |
| – | 21 July | City | 3 | Newton | 0 | Auckland Domain # 2, 1:30pm |
| – | 21 July | Ponsonby | 8 | Devonport | 0 | Auckland Domain # 2, 3pm |
| Round 13 | 4 August | Richmond | 11 | Ponsonby | 8 | Auckland Domain # 1, 1:30pm |
| – | 4 August | Devonport | unplayed | Newton | unplayed | Carlaw Park # 2, 3pm |
| – | 4 August | City | 5 | Marist | 3 | Auckland Domain # 1, 3pm |
| Round 14 | 18 August | Ponsonby | 5 | Newton | 0 | Auckland Domain 1:30pm |
| – | 18 August | Richmond | 8 | City | 7 | Auckland Domain 3pm |
| – | 18 August | Marist | unplayed | Devonport | unplayed | Auckland Domain 3pm |

=== Stallard Cup knockout competition ===
1934 Stallard Cup Results
| | Date | | Score | | Score | Venue |
| Round 1 | 25 August | Richmond | 12 | Ponsonby | 7 | Auckland Domain, 1.30pm |
| – | 25 August | Marist | 5 | Newton | 0 | Auckland Domain, 3pm |
| – | 25 August | Devonport | LBD | City | WBD | Auckland Domain, 3pm |
| Semi Final | 1 September | City | 4 | Marist | 3 | Auckland Domain, 1:30pm |
| Final | 8 September | Richmond | 21 | City | 9 | Carlaw Park # 2 |

== Lower grade competitions ==
=== Lower grade clubs and finishing positions (with competition points) ===
During the middle part of the season the Junior Management Committee revised the weight allowances for the junior grades. They were Third Intermediate – 10st 13lbs; Fourth Grade – 9st, 13lbs; Fifth Grade – 9st 6lbs; Sixth Grade – 9st 3lbs; Seventh Grade – 8st 10lb.

Richmond won the Davis Junior Points Shield competition with the points as follows: Richmond 134, Papakura 94, City 75, Marist 69, Manukau 67, Pt Chevalier 63, Ponsonby 58, Devonport 51, Mt Albert 50, Otahuhu 47, Akarana 19, Mangere 12, Avondale 4

==== Second grade (Wright Cup) ====
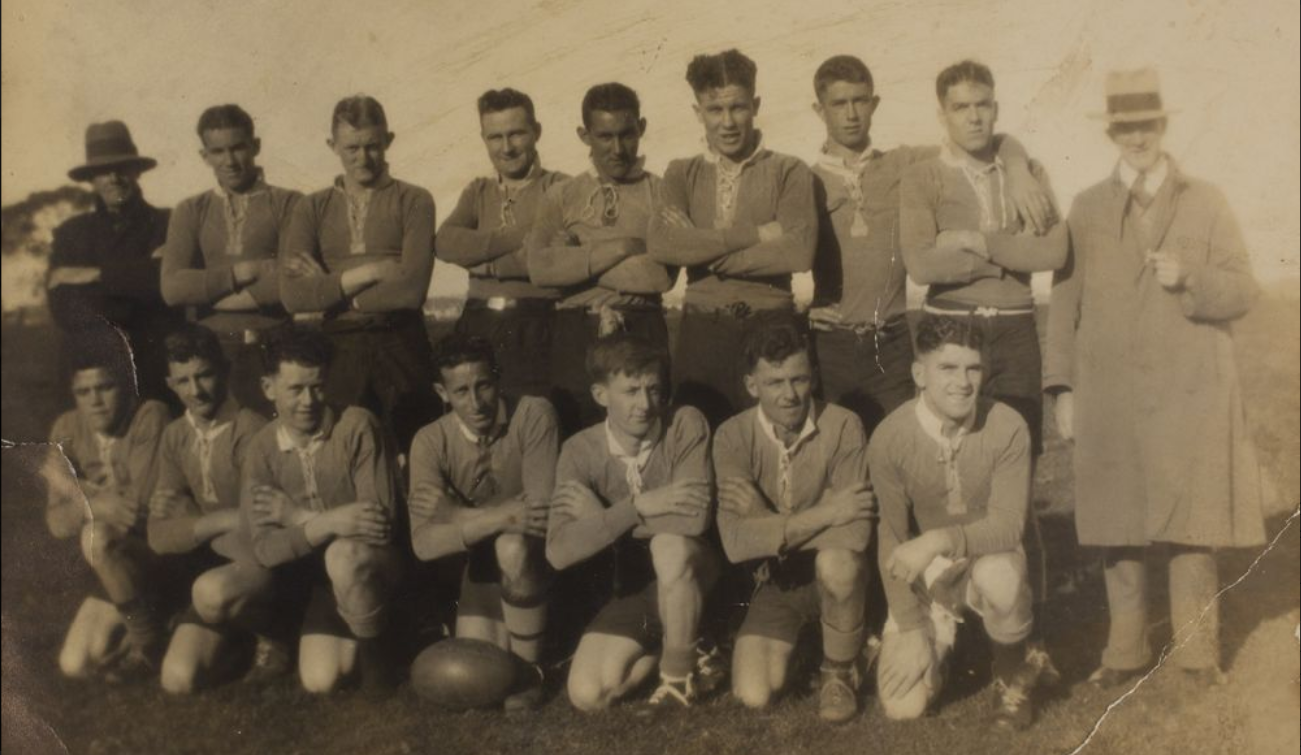
The champions of the second grade, Otahuhu.

Ōtāhuhu Rovers won the championship by one point ahead of Papakura after only losing one of their 14 matches when they went down 9–0 to Papakura in round 12. Papakura were coached on Wednesdays by former Devonport (North Shore Albions) and Auckland representative Alf Scott. The majority of results were reported but a handful of scores were not so the points for and against is slightly inaccurate in some teams cases. In the knockout competition Ōtāhuhu and Papakura drew 10-10 and in the replay 2 weeks later on September 15 Papakura won 21–5. Papakura went on to win the knockout competition when they beat Māngere United 26–3 in the final at Onehunga. Papakura beat Mt Albert in the semi final 18–5. Māngere had made the final after default wins against Ellerslie and Papakura B, who had entered a side in the competition but ultimately did not field a team. The match was to be the last ever played by the senior Māngere United club side after they played in Auckland competitions from 1915 to 1934. The Ellerslie side struggled throughout the season and defaulted at least 3 of their matches including their round 1 knockout game.

| Team | Pld | W | D | L | F | A | Pts |
|---|---|---|---|---|---|---|---|
| Ōtāhuhu Rovers | 14 | 11 | 2 | 1 | 82 | 34 | 24 |
| Papakura | 14 | 11 | 1 | 2 | 137 | 41 | 23 |
| Mount Albert United | 14 | 6 | 1 | 7 | 81 | 96 | 13 |
| Māngere United | 14 | 6 | 0 | 8 | 86 | 84 | 12 |
| Point Chevalier | 14 | 5 | 1 | 8 | 85 | 107 | 11 |
| Ellerslie United | 14 | 0 | 1 | 13 | 31 | 141 | 1 |

==== Third grade open (Monteith Shield) ====
Richmond won the championship unbeaten from 13 matches. Glen Ora finished runner up. Teams were given 2 points for a bye following Marist's withdrawal after round 8 hence the wins and point totals not matching in some cases. There were also several scores not reported so the for and against tallies are somewhat inaccurate but the final competition points are correct in each case. Ponsonby won the knockout competition when they beat Glen Ora 8–2 in the final on September 1. Ponsonby had beaten Richmond in their previous match to eliminate the champions, while Glen Ora beat Mount Albert in their semi final 13–5.

| Team | Pld | W | D | L | F | A | Pts |
|---|---|---|---|---|---|---|---|
| Richmond Rovers | 12 | 12 | 0 | 0 | 216 | 53 | 24 |
| Glen Ora | 13 | 10 | 0 | 3 | 52 | 20 | 22 |
| Mount Albert United | 12 | 8 | 0 | 4 | 140 | 70 | 16 |
| Ponsonby United | 12 | 5 | 0 | 7 | 113 | 74 | 10 |
| Akarana | 11 | 4 | 0 | 7 | 47 | 93 | 8 |
| Marist Old Boys | 8 | 2 | 0 | 4 | 23 | 33 | 4 |
| Māngere United | 12 | 0 | 0 | 12 | 21 | 244 | 0 |

==== Third Grade Intermediate (Walker Cup) ====
Marist won the championship with an extraordinary 43 competition points in one of the longest championship seasons in any grade to this point in Auckland Rugby League history. In doing so they were awarded the Walker Cup. The knockout games at the end of the season also contributed to the championship points. Teams were also given 2 points for a bye as well which explains some discrepancies between win totals and competition points gained. There were many matches that did not have scores reported though the competition points are accurate as they were published in the newspaper at the season end. Marist beat Manukau B in the knockout final on 27 October to also claim the Murray Cup. Teams received competition points for byes which is why the competition points are slightly inflated.

| Team | Pld | W | D | L | F | A | Pts |
|---|---|---|---|---|---|---|---|
| Marist Old Boys | 23 | 18 | 3 | 2 | 216 | 53 | 43 |
| Ponsonby United | 20 | 17 | 1 | 3 | 267 | 82 | 41 |
| Point Chevalier | 21 | 14 | 1 | 6 | 113 | 78 | 37 |
| City Rovers | 20 | 7 | 3 | 5 | 156 | 104 | 35 |
| Papakura | 23 | 14 | 0 | 9 | 220 | 131 | 28 |
| Manukau B | 21 | 11 | 1 | 9 | 138 | 92 | 23 |
| Richmond Rovers | 22 | 10 | 1 | 11 | 125 | 149 | 21 |
| Northcote & Birkenhead Ramblers | 17 | 6 | 1 | 10 | 14 | 35 | 19 |
| Manukau A | 19 | 3 | 3 | 13 | 34 | 116 | 15 |
| Akarana | 21 | 4 | 1 | 17 | 56 | 214 | 11 |
| Devonport United | 19 | 4 | 0 | 15 | 37 | 88 | 10 |
| Ōtāhuhu Rovers | 19 | 3 | 1 | 15 | 42 | 136 | 8 |
| Glenora | 18 | 0 | 1 | 17 | 20 | 160 | 3 |

==== Fourth Grade (Hospital Cup) ====
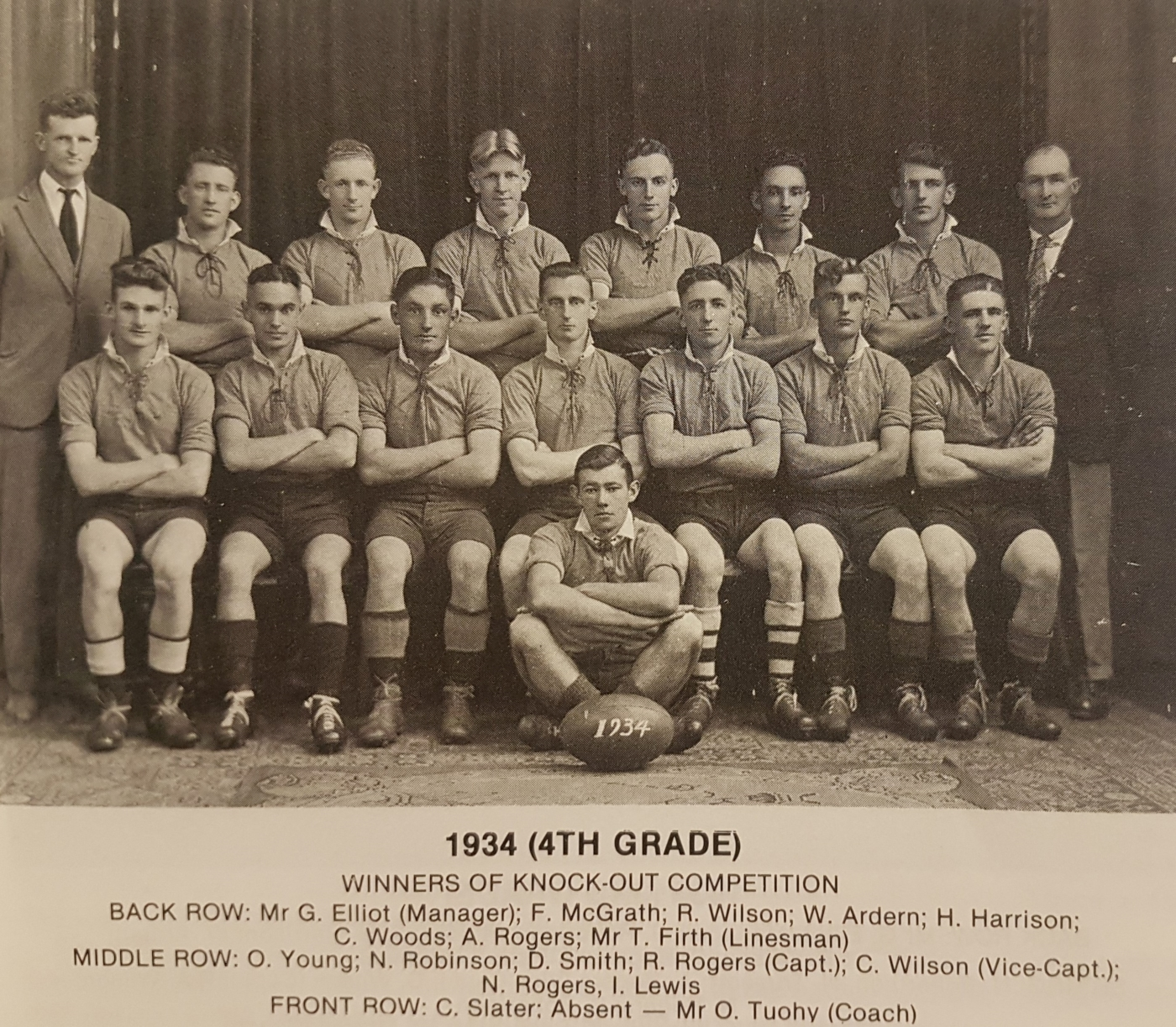
Glen Ora who were the knockout winners

Newton Rangers won the championship. Whilst they had been a founding club in Auckland Rugby League they had won very few championship competitions. They were generally competitive in the senior grade from time to time however they typically struggled in the lower grades in the early decades winning very few titles. It was just their fifth championship in any grade through 25 seasons of competition. Newton finished a single point ahead of Manukau and sealed it after a 6–0 win over Marist on September 1. In the knockout competition semi final they beat Marist, while in the other semi final Glen Ora had a 14–11 win over Papakura. In the final Glen Ora beat Newton to achieve their first ever trophy in the club's history. The same team coached by O. Tuohy would go on to win the championship in 1935. They were captained by R. Rogers who became their manager for the 1935 season. The win-draw-loss results for all sides are accurate however many scores were not reported so the for and against totals are inaccurate aside from Papakura who had every single result reported in the Franklin Times. Northcote withdrew from the competition after round 13 having played 11 games.

| Team | Pld | W | D | L | F | A | Pts |
|---|---|---|---|---|---|---|---|
| Newton Rangers | 16 | 12 | 1 | 3 | 126 | 38 | 25 |
| Manukau | 17 | 11 | 2 | 4 | 139 | 41 | 24 |
| Marist Old Boys | 17 | 10 | 2 | 5 | 167 | 57 | 22 |
| Papakura | 17 | 10 | 2 | 5 | 102 | 94 | 20 |
| Glen Ora | 15 | 8 | 1 | 6 | 78 | 41 | 17 |
| Richmond Rovers | 15 | 5 | 3 | 7 | 78 | 63 | 15 |
| Ellerslie United | 16 | 6 | 1 | 9 | 50 | 53 | 13 |
| Point Chevalier | 17 | 1 | 1 | 15 | 43 | 315 | 3 |
| Northcote & Birkenhead Ramblers | 11 | 0 | 1 | 10 | 5 | 86 | 1 |

==== Fifth Grade (Endean Shield) ====
City won the championship with an unbeaten season. They also won the knockout competition (Milicich Cup) with a 24–11 win over Richmond in the final on September 22 following a 41–0 win over Ōtāhuhu in the semi final. Richmond had won their semi final over Akarana by 18–2. Akarana had not competed in the championship but entered a team in the knockout competition. They beat Pt Chevalier in the first round. Pt Chevalier had initially entered a side in the championship but withdrew after the first week.

| Team | Pld | W | D | L | F | A | Pts |
|---|---|---|---|---|---|---|---|
| City Rovers | 14 | 13 | 1 | 0 | 233 | 30 | 27 |
| Richmond Rovers | 14 | 10 | 1 | 3 | 134 | 50 | 21 |
| Mt Albert United | 16 | 10 | 1 | 5 | 87 | 75 | 21 |
| Ōtāhuhu Rovers | 14 | 7 | 1 | 6 | 48 | 66 | 15 |
| Papakura | 15 | 4 | 3 | 8 | 28 | 76 | 11 |
| Devonport United | 14 | 4 | 0 | 10 | 19 | 92 | 8 |
| Manukau | 14 | 3 | 2 | 10 | 37 | 128 | 8 |
| Ponsonby United | 15 | 4 | 0 | 10 | 59 | 128 | 8 |

==== Sixth Grade (Rhodes Shield) ====
Ellerslie won the championship with a 12 win, 2 loss record, comfortably ahead of Devonport United. They also won the Hammill Cup when they won the knockout final with a 9–6 win over Newton on September 15. Avondale withdrew after 11 rounds. Not all of the scores were reported so the for and against totals are inaccurate however the win-draw-loss and competition points are correct as they were published in the newspapers at the end of the season.

| Team | Pld | W | D | L | F | A | Pts |
|---|---|---|---|---|---|---|---|
| Ellerslie United | 14 | 12 | 0 | 2 | 90 | 50 | 24 |
| Devonport United | 15 | 8 | 1 | 6 | 56 | 12 | 17 |
| Richmond Rovers | 14 | 7 | 0 | 7 | 32 | 30 | 14 |
| Point Chevalier | 15 | 5 | 2 | 8 | 45 | 91 | 12 |
| Newton Rangers | 14 | 4 | 1 | 9 | 37 | 45 | 9 |
| Avondale | 10 | 2 | 0 | 8 | 33 | 65 | 4 |

==== Seventh Grade (Myers Cup) ====
Richmond A won the championship with a totally dominant season, winning all 14 of their matches and most to 0. They also went on to win the knockout competition with a 9–3 win over Richmond B on September 15 after beating City 11–5 in the semi final The Richmond B team had qualified for the final after defeating Devonport 5–3 in the other semi final. Mt Albert withdrew after 10 rounds. Several of the matches did not have scores reported so the for and against totals are inaccurate however the win-draw-loss and competition points are accurate.

| Team | Pld | W | D | L | F | A | Pts |
|---|---|---|---|---|---|---|---|
| Richmond Rovers A | 14 | 14 | 0 | 0 | 268 | 8 | 28 |
| Devonport United | 14 | 8 | 0 | 6 | 17 | 28 | 16 |
| City Rovers | 14 | 7 | 0 | 7 | 69 | 46 | 14 |
| Richmond Rovers B | 13 | 5 | 1 | 7 | 51 | 106 | 11 |
| Northcote & Birkenhead Ramblers | 13 | 3 | 1 | 9 | 52 | 91 | 7 |
| Mt Albert United | 10 | 0 | 0 | 10 | 10 | 188 | 0 |

==== Schoolboys (Newport Shield) ====
Avondale won the Newport Shield for winning the championship with a 15 win - 2 loss record narrowly ahead of Richmond who were 2 points behind them. Avondale also won the Ernest Davis Cup for winning the knockout competition when they defeated Marist A on 20 October. Marist won the seven-a-side competition (Robert Reid Memorial Shield) which was played once a week at Carlaw Park. Ōtāhuhu withdrew after 18 August. There were many results that did not have a score reported however the win-draw-loss and point totals are accurate.

- Seven a-side: Avondale, City, Devonport, Ellerslie, Marist A, Northcote

| Team | Pld | W | D | L | F | A | Pts |
|---|---|---|---|---|---|---|---|
| Avondale | 17 | 15 | 0 | 2 | 230 | 20 | 30 |
| Richmond | 16 | 12 | 0 | 4 | 119 | 18 | 28 |
| Ellerslie | 14 | 9 | 0 | 5 | 102 | 59 | 18 |
| Marist B | 14 | 7 | 1 | 6 | 38 | 94 | 15 |
| Marist A | 13 | 6 | 1 | 6 | 52 | 91 | 13 |
| Northcote | 14 | 5 | 0 | 9 | 41 | 124 | 10 |
| Devonport | 13 | 4 | 0 | 9 | 25 | 91 | 8 |
| City | 14 | 3 | 0 | 11 | 31 | 75 | 6 |
| Otahuhu | 9 | 0 | 0 | 9 | 8 | 104 | 0 |

=== Notable lower grade matches ===
1934 was notable for the more formal playing of matches between several Māori rugby league teams. The Mangere United second grade club team, made up largely of Māori players as it had been for two decades, played several exhibition matches and the Auckland Māori team was later formed and played several matches.

A sub-league was formed at Tuakau at the beginning of the season. These teams met twice. The first resulted in an 11–10 win to the Māngere team 11–10 in Tuakau on 4 May. Tuakau returned the favour by beating the Auckland side 12–11 in a match played as curtain-raiser to the Auckland v Taranaki representative match. Māngere also played a Lower Waikato side. Later in the season the Mt Albert side travelled to Tuakau to play a match. And then on 8 September a trial match was played by the Waikato Māori selectors with a combined Tuakau-Waikato Māori side selected by Ernie Asher at Sturges Park in Otahuhu against the local Otahuhu Rovers side.

==== Lower Waikato v Māngere Māori ====
| 4 June | Lower Waikato | 12–13 | Māngere United | Tuakau Recreation Ground |
| 3:00 | Try: Rua Cooper, J Cooper; Con: J Cooper, M Ngataki; Pen: M Ngataki | | Try: N Harvey, Johnson, Grubb; Con: T Rau, Roberts | Attendance: 200; Referee: Fisher |

==== Māngere United v Tuakau ====
| 30 June | Māngere United | 10–11 | Tuakau | Carlaw Park |
| 1:30 | Try: Paul, Harvey; Con: Rau 2 | | Try: Rau Cooper, D Peters, J Cooper; Con: D Peters |

==== Tuakau v Mt Albert ====
The players who had transferred from Marist made their debut for Mount Albert with Len and Bert Schultz both scoring tries and Des Herring converting two of their four tries.

| 12 August | Tuakau | 9–16 | Mount Albert | Tuakau |
| 3:00 | Try: N Turner; Pen: J Cooper 2, A Wade | | Try: Bayly, Bert Schultz, Silk, Len Schultz; Con: Des Herring 2 |

==== Tuakau v Otahuhu ====
| 18 August | Tuakau | 27–16 | Otahuhu | Tuakau |
| 3:00 | Try: Rau Cooper 2, A Wade 2, W Warbrick, T Cooper, C Anderson; Con: Rau Cooper 2, T Cooper | | Try: T Why 3, J Stanaway; Con: Frank Phillips | Referee: R.A. Rae |

==== Northland B v Richmond Reserves ====
On September 1 the Richmond Reserve grade side travelled to Whangarei to play Northland B at Kensington Park. The Richmond side was strengthened considerably by first graders Ted Mincham, Ernie McNeil, and Ray Lawless. Lawless had represented New Zealand, while Mincham would make his New Zealand debut the following season and he scored four tries and kicked two goals in the Richmond side's easy win. Loose forward, Ralph Jenkinson also scored a try and was another regular first grade Richmond player. They also featured standoff Noel Bickerton who made his first grade debut the following year and went on to play for New Zealand in 1937. The Northland B side included a handful of players who were regular first grade representative players in this era such as Rod Hamilton, Bob White, and Edward O'Callaghan.

| 1 September | Northland B | 10-31 | Richmond Reserves | Taradale Park, Napier |
| 3:00 | Try: Rod Hamilton, C Taylor; Con: Bob White 2p | | Try: Ted Mincham 4, H Campbell, Swanberg, A Lenne, Ralph Jenkinson; Con: Ted Mincham, Swanberg, C Verrall; Pen: Ted Mincham | Attendance: 1,000; Referee: J.H. Hill |

==== Tuakau and Waikato Māori v Otahuhu Rovers ====
| 8 September | Otahuhu | 5–23 | Tuakau and Waikato Māori | Sturgess Park, Otahuhu |
| 3:00 | Try: Whye; Con: Unknown x 1 | | Try: Unknown x 7 Con: Unknown x 1 | Attendance: 300; Referee: A Kirkland |

==== Taradale v Mt Albert ====
| 15 September | Taradale | 12–22 | Mount Albert | Taradale Park, Napier |
| 3:00 | Try: Dwan, Farquhar; Con: Farquhar 2 Pen: Adams | | Try: Roy Hardgrave 3, Len Schultz 3 Con: Des Herring, Ralby | Attendance: 1,000 |

== Auckland representative season ==
The Auckland selectors for the season were William Mincham (Ted Mincham's father), who had played for Auckland in the 1910s, Bert Avery, and Ernie Asher. The first representative fixture of the season was played against Taranaki with Lou Hutt being appointed captain. The Taranaki team was being picked by Frank Delgrosso. In the match with Northland Roy Hardgrave played his first representative match in New Zealand since his return from playing for St Helens in England.

=== Auckland v Taranaki (inter-provincial) ===
| 30 June | Auckland | 35–8 | Taranaki | Carlaw Park 1 |
| 3:00 | Try: Harry Wayne 2, Mortimer Stephens, Stan Prentice, Bert Cooke 2, Stan Clark, L Stevens, Lou Hutt; Con: Norm Campbell, Cliff Satherley 2 Pen: Ted Mincham | | Try: Moorhead, Ray Arnold; Con: Ray Arnold | Referee: Maurice Wetherill |

=== Auckland v Northland (inter-provincial) ===
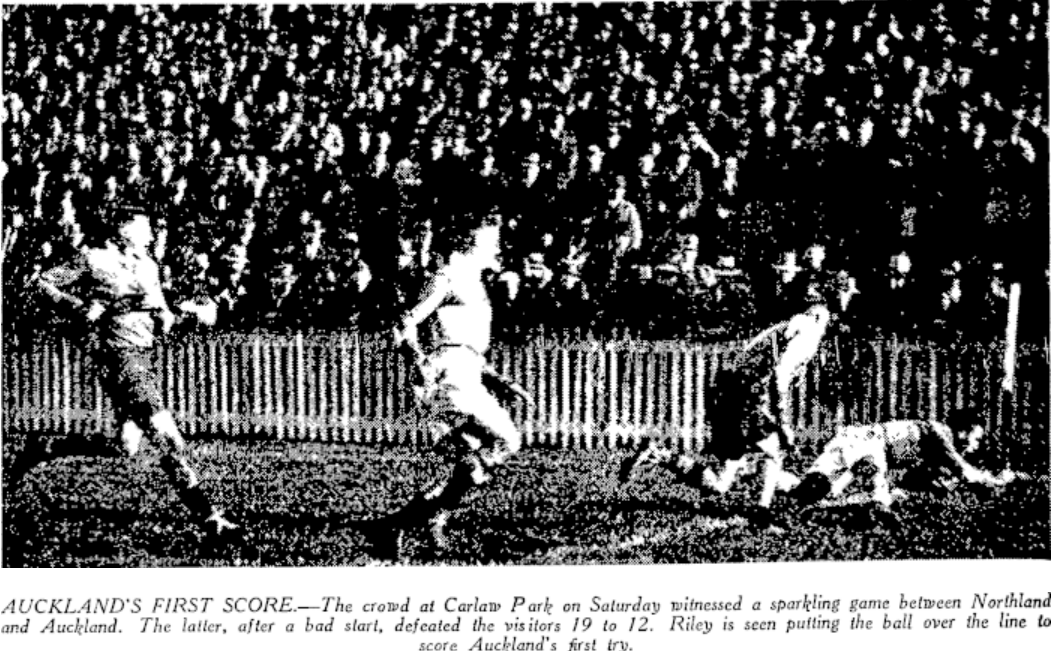
Brian Riley scoring for Auckland in their 19–12 win.

Northland started strongly with international Ted Meyer scoring a try and with another to Robert (Bob) White who had transferred to Northland from City Rovers during the season. They pushed out to a 10–0 lead with a conversion and penalty to Claude Hamilton. Auckland came back with tries to Brian Riley and Vincent Axmann before Northland retook the lead late with another penalty to Hamilton. Auckland then dominated the final stages to score twice (Stan Clark and Trevor Hall) to take out the match.

| 11 August | Auckland | 19–12 | Northland | Carlaw Park 1 |
| 3:00 | Try: Arthur Kay, Brian Riley, Vincent Axmann, Stan Clark, Trevor Hall; Con: Claude Dempsey 2 | | Try: Ted Meyer, Bob White; Con: Claude Hamilton; Pen: Claude Hamilton 2 | Referee: Percy Rogers |

=== Inter-Island match ===
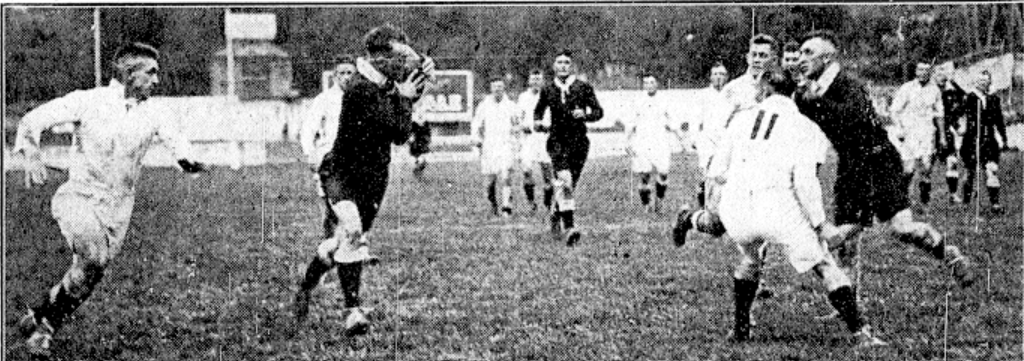
Stan Prentice taking a pass from Roy Powell for the North Island team.

| 1 September | North Island | 36–18 | South Island | Carlaw Park |
| 3:00 | Try: George Tittleton, Wally Tittleton, R.E. Smith, Stan Prentice, Bert Cooke 2, Lou Hutt, Cliff Satherley; Con: George Tittleton 3, R.E. Smith 3 | | Try: M Morris, T O'Connor, Billy Glynn 2 Con: P Scott 2, E Hamberger | Attendance: 9,000; Referee: Percy Rogers |

=== Auckland v South Auckland (Waikato) (inter-provincial) ===
| 15 September | Auckland | 35–16 | South Auckland | Carlaw Park 1 |
| 3:00 | Try: Mortimer Stephens, Ted Mincham 2, Bert Cooke, Brian Riley, Jim Laird, Ray Lawless, Trevor Hall; Con: Norm Campbell 4 | | Try: T Pawson, Don Pitt, J Fleming 2 Con: Don Pitt 2 Pen: Don Pitt | Referee: Maurice Wetherill |

=== Auckland representative matches played and scorers ===
| No | Name | Club Team | Play | Tries | Con | Pen | Points |
|---|---|---|---|---|---|---|---|
| 1 | Norm Campbell | Marist | 2 | 0 | 5 | 0 | 10 |
| 2 | Bert Cooke | Richmond | 2 | 3 | 0 | 0 | 9 |
| 2 | Trevor Hall | Newton | 2 | 3 | 0 | 0 | 9 |
| 4 | Ted Mincham | Richmond | 2 | 2 | 0 | 1 | 8 |
| 5 | Harry Wayne | City | 1 | 2 | 0 | 0 | 6 |
| 5 | Mortimer Stephens | Newton | 3 | 2 | 0 | 0 | 6 |
| 5 | Stan Clark | City | 3 | 2 | 0 | 0 | 6 |
| 5 | Brian Riley | Ponsonby | 2 | 2 | 0 | 0 | 6 |
| 9 | Cliff Satherley | Richmond | 1 | 0 | 2 | 0 | 4 |
| 9 | Claude Dempsey | Newton | 1 | 0 | 2 | 0 | 4 |
| 11 | Stan Prentice | Richmond | 1 | 1 | 0 | 0 | 3 |
| 11 | L Stevens | Devonport | 1 | 1 | 0 | 0 | 3 |
| 11 | Ray Lawless | Richmond | 2 | 1 | 0 | 0 | 3 |
| 11 | Lou Hutt | Ponsonby | 1 | 1 | 0 | 0 | 3 |
| 11 | Arthur Kay | Ponsonby | 1 | 1 | 0 | 0 | 3 |
| 11 | Vincent Axmann | City | 1 | 1 | 0 | 0 | 3 |
| 11 | Jim Laird | Marist | 2 | 1 | 0 | 0 | 3 |
| 18 | Roy Powell | Richmond | 2 | 0 | 0 | 0 | 0 |
| 18 | Bill Telford | Richmond | 2 | 0 | 0 | 0 | 0 |
| 18 | Roy Hardgrave | Newton | 1 | 0 | 0 | 0 | 0 |
| 18 | Ted Brimble | Newton | 1 | 0 | 0 | 0 | 0 |
| 18 | Maurice Quirke | Newton | 1 | 0 | 0 | 0 | 0 |
| 18 | Ted Scott | Devonport | 1 | 0 | 0 | 0 | 0 |
| 18 | William McLaughlin | City | 1 | 0 | 0 | 0 | 0 |

== Tamaki (Auckland Māori) representative team ==
For the first time a recognised Māori representative team from Auckland played matches. They played against South Waikato Māori, Taranaki Māori, and Waikato Māori winning two and drawing one match. The origins of the team partly began with a letter sent to Mr G, Grey Campbell in late July by Rev. W.N. Panapa (secretary) of the organisation proposing a Tamaki team, "representative of the isthmus between Auckland and Onehunga" to challenge for the Waitangi Māori Shield. It was also reported that a Māori board of control had been set up in Auckland "with a view to encouraging friendly rivalry between different tribes". Their first match was against South Waikato Māori at Carlaw Park which they won easily 36–13. They then travelled to New Plymouth to play Taranaki Māori for the newly created Waitangi Shield. Stan Rickards (president of the Mangere club, and chairman of Auckland Māori Rugby League) travelled as the team manager with Ernie Asher representing the Auckland Rugby League on the trip. They won it with a comfortable victory 32–5. Two weeks later they took the shield to Huntly where they played Waikato Māori as part of the celebrations for the coronation of Māori King Korokī Mahuta. They held on to the shield with a hard-fought 5–5 draw. Their final match of the season was on a league football charity day at Carlaw Park where they took on the Auckland Colt side and went down 29–12.

=== Tāmaki Māori v South Waikato Māori ===
| 12 September | Tāmaki Māori | 36–13 | South Waikato Māori | Carlaw Park |
| 3:00 | Try: Steve Watene 2, D Nathan, Alex Nathan, Te Rau, Roberts, Bill Turei 4 Con: Steve Watene, D Nathan, Bill Turei | | Try: Thomas Pawson, W Wharakura, Rau Cooper; Con: J Cooper, Huatahi Paki | Referee: W Simpson |

=== Taranaki Māori v Tamaki Māori(Waitangi Shield) ===
| 22 September | Taranaki Māori | 5–32 | Tamaki Māori | New Plymouth |
| 3:00 | Try: Unknown x 1 Con: Unknown x 1 | | Try: Steve Watene 4, Duke Hira, D Nathan, Alex Nathan, W Roberts; Con: Unknown x 3 Pen: Unknown x 1 |

=== Waikato Māori v Tamaki (Waitangi Shield) ===
| 6 October | Waikato Māori | 5–5 | Tamaki | Huntly |
| | Try: (halfback); Pen: Peckham | | Try: D Nathan; Con: Puti Tipene Watene | Referee: A Harlock |

=== Auckland Colts v Tamaki ===
| 20 October | Auckland Colts | 29–12 | Tamaki | Carlaw Park 1 |
| 3:00 | Try: Sidney Loader, Johnson 2, Brady 2, Frank Halloran, Walter Stockley; Con: Cyril Wiberg 3, Johnson | | Try: Duke Hira 4 | Referee: S Fisher |

=== Tamaki (Auckland Māori) representative matches played and scorers ===
There were 4 matches played by the team but the team list was not printed for the side that toured Taranaki so only those who scored points in the match are known. The following players were part of the touring squad but not named in the match report and they may have played: B Paul, Bill Turei, B Roberts, P Kautoa, L Wilson, P Rewha, A Kelsall, P Daniels, T Rau, K Rawiri, G Heri. Steve Watene played in all 4 matches and top scored with 22 points. D Hira was the top try scorer with 5, 4 of them coming in the match with the Auckland Colts.

| No | Name | Club Team | Play | Tries | Con | Pen | Points |
|---|---|---|---|---|---|---|---|
| 1 | Steve Watene | City Rovers | 4 | 6 | 2 | 0 | 22 |
| 2 | Duke Hira | Orakei | 4 | 5 | 0 | 0 | 15 |
| 3 | Bill Turei | City Rovers | 2 | 4 | 1 | 0 | 14 |
| 4 | D Nathan | City Rovers | 4 | 3 | 1 | 0 | 11 |
| 5 | Alex Nathan | Newton Rangers | 3 | 2 | 0 | 0 | 6 |
| 5 | W Roberts | Mangere | 3 | 2 | 0 | 0 | 6 |
| 7 | T Rau | Mangere | 2 | 1 | 0 | 0 | 3 |
| 8 | R Roberts | Mangere | 3 | 1 | 0 | 0 | 3 |
| 9 | B Paul | Orakei | 3 | 0 | 0 | 0 | 0 |
| 9 | K Rawiri | City Rovers | 3 | 0 | 0 | 0 | 0 |
| 9 | R Sellars | Newton Rangers | 1 | 0 | 0 | 0 | 0 |
| 9 | Lou Wilson | Mangere | 1 | 0 | 0 | 0 | 0 |
| 9 | J Kelsall | Newton Rangers | 1 | 0 | 0 | 0 | 0 |
| 9 | P Kautoa | ? | 2 | 0 | 0 | 0 | 0 |
| 9 | Morgan | Papakura | 2 | 0 | 0 | 0 | 0 |
| 9 | G Heri | Mangere | 2 | 0 | 0 | 0 | 0 |
| 9 | P Nathan | ? | 2 | 0 | 0 | 0 | 0 |
| 9 | J Stanaway | Otahuhu | 1 | 0 | 0 | 0 | 0 |
| 9 | P Daniels | ? | 1 | 0 | 0 | 0 | 0 |
| 9 | J Hira | Onewhero | 1 | 0 | 0 | 0 | 0 |

== Annual general meetings and club news ==
- Auckland Rugby League Junior Management Committee Mr. D Wilkie announced that Mr. T. Davis was resigning as secretary of the junior management after 8 years in the position. It was proposed that he be elected a life member of the Auckland Rugby League, an honour that had only been given to seven people to this point. The Primary Schools Committee announced that its officers were patron, Dr. Pezaro; president, Mr. R.E. Newport; and chairman, Mr. W. Stanley.
- Auckland Rugby League Referees Association held their annual meeting on 19 March. There were over 40 members in attendance and the chairman Mr. A. Ball asked that his resignation be accepted after 11 years in that position and 20 in total as a member. Mr. Les E. Bull was elected president, Mr. A. McCowatt deputy chairman, and Mr. Simpson treasurer.
- City Rovers Football Club held their general meeting at Carlaw Park on Tuesday 20 March at Carlaw Park. A good attendance was recorded and fourteen new members were elected, including four senior players. The financial statement showed a credit of £70 and a profit on the season of over £23. Mr. R.B. Ashby was elected patron, and Mr. L. McDonald the president.
- Devonport United held their annual meeting over Anthony's Tearooms, Devonport on Wednesday 21 March. The meeting was presided over by Mr. Arch Ferguson and saw 80 members and supporters in attendance. The club had cash and assets amounting to £59. Mr. A.W.D. Meiklejohn was elected patron, Mr. J. Donald president, and Mr. Arch Ferguson vice-president. Mr. C. McSweeney donated a trophy to be used as the club decided and Mr. Wouldes donated one for the most improved senior player. At the Auckland Rugby League Board of Control meeting on 16 May Devonport applied for and were granted permission to play their match versus Richmond on the North Shore in aid of the Noel Crump fund. He was raising funds to go to the 1934 British Empire Games where he would later compete and win a bronze medal. Prior to the round 6 matches Devonport advised the league that Mr. Bert Laing, sen., had been appointed coach and selector to succeed A. W. Seagar who would revert to being a playing member only.
- Ellerslie United League Football Club held their annual meeting at the club's Training Shed, Findlay St, Ellerslie on Wednesday, 14 March. There was a large attendance with the balance sheet shown to be in a satisfactory position. Mr. W.J. Jordan M.P., was elected patron, Mr. J. McInnarny president, and Mr. F. Chapman club captain. Mr. G. Chapman, jun., was unanimously elected an honorary life member of the club. Proposals for the floodlighting of the Ellerslie Domain were discussed by the Ellerslie Domain Board and representatives of the local sports bodies on 15 May. It was recommended by the Auckland Electric-Power Board "that not less than two lights be installed. The Power Board would be prepared to install the lights for £14 on condition that the Domain Board would undertake to pay a flat rate of £2 15s per lamp per annum, inclusive of power and maintenance, and accept the arrangement for not less than five years".
- Glenora Rugby League Football Club held their annual meeting at the Glen Eden Town Hall. A "good gathering of supporters and followers" attended with Mr. A.J. Routley elected Patron, and Mr W. McNeil chairman. Trainings were being held at the Glen Eden Recreation Ground. Glenora requested that a referee be sent to their club to address the players on the finer points of play so the Auckland Rugby League Referees Association agreed to send Mr. S. Billman to visit the Glen Eden club. The league made a special grant towards the Glenora club towards ground expenses. They advised the league that they had signed over 55 new players in the 1934 season and were making good progress in the Glen Eden district.
- Māngere United League Football Club were asked to compel spectators to stand back on the bank at games staged in Māngere.
- Manukau League Football Club held their annual meeting in Kelvin Hall, Queen Street, Onehunga on Monday, 19 March. The Onehunga Borough Council at a meeting on 3 April stated that the Manukau league club could use its recreation reserve provided it laid a portion of the concrete floor in its new shed, and a water metre was installed. On 14 April a "Big Maori Carnival and Athletic Sports" event was held at the Onehunga Recreation Ground. It included senior league matches. After the 30 June round of matches a member mentioned at a Board of Control meeting that facilities continued to be lacking at the Manukau ground with no lines being marked, no flags, and the goal posts were down at one end. The match still took place anyway.
- Marist Brothers Old Boys League Football Club held their annual meeting in the League Rooms, Courthouse Lane on Thursday 22, March. Nearly one hundred members were in attendance to hear that the club was in a healthy financial position. Reverend Dr. Liston, Bishop of Auckland was elected patron, Mr. E. Lahman president, and Mr. Jack Kirwan secretary. Marist advertised for a special general meeting to be held at the Chamber of Commerce rooms on Swanson Street on Monday, 28. It turned out that the voting at their original meeting was declared void as unqualified members had voted. Mr. Cyril Sneddon, the president of New Zealand Rugby League was invited to attend and the following officers were elected: patron, Reverend Dr. Liston; president, Mr. J. Sayegh; club captain, Mr. Hec Brisbane; hon secretary, Mr. Jack Kirwan; Mr. O. Robertson. In round 6 eight of the senior Marist players (Wilf Hassan, C. Dunn, D. Herring, the 3 Shultz brothers, and Claude List) refused to appear. They were in a dispute with the club over "whether a portion of expenditure should apply to senior players alone or be devoted to general club services, including juniors". Despite fielding many juniors the team still won their match. Hassan transferred to the rugby code and played for Marist rugby club the following weekend. The Marist club tried to suspend the players involved but the New Zealand Rugby League Council said that the players in question could apply for transfers to other clubs. Marist appealed this decision and when four of the players did apply for transfers the Marist club refused this.
- Mt. Albert United Rugby League Football Club held their annual meeting in the King George Hall, Mt Albert Terminus on Thursday, 8 March. It was their sixth annual meeting and it was commented by the president Mr. J. Eccles that the club was in a sound financial position. The Mayor of Mount Albert Mr. Raymond Ferner was elected Patron, Mr. Arthur Richards M.P. was elected vice-patron, Mr. J. Eccles president, and Mr. R. Wilson secretary and treasurer. Mr. W.F. Clarke who had held office for the first six years of the club tendered his resignation and as a mark of appreciation was elected a life member. They held their annual practice at Fowlds Park, Morningside on 7 April. Prior to this in previous seasons they had held practices and games at the ground at Springleigh Ave and at Fowlds Park which had previously been known as Morningside Reserve but in July 1933 was renamed Fowlds Park in honour of the honourable Sir George Fowlds. A special general meeting was to be held at Fowld's Park on Saturday, 21 April regarding the changing of the club's colours.
- New Lynn Rugby League Football Club held a special meeting at the Old Post Office, Totara Avenue on 22 March.
- Newton Rangers Football Club held their annual meeting at Grey's Buildings, Courthouse Lane on Monday 12 March. The meeting was presided over by Mr. E.W. Taylor with over seventy members and supporters in attendance. Mr. D. Wilkie, chairman of the junior management committee was also in attendance. Their report touched on the playing improvement of the previous season and the balance sheet showed a credit of £19 10/. Mr. Matt. Hooper was elected patron, Mr W. Monteith vice-patron, and Mr. John A. Lee MP president. Notably Mr. P. Henry was elected treasurer for the 17th year. Mr. A.J. McGregor ("Dougie") was unanimously elected as the sole selector and coach of the senior team with Mr. A. McLeod to fill the same role for the reserve team. Mr. A. Middleton was chosen as the trainer and Mr. Turner the property steward. Before the season started the secretary received a cablegram suggesting that Roy Hardgrave would be returning to New Zealand to play for his old club. He left Newton to go and play for St Helens in England in 1929 and had spent five seasons there. He arrived back in Auckland on 25 June aboard the Aorangi with his wife and four-year-old daughter. He was met at the wharf by players and officials of the Newton club. A "Welcome Home" dance was held for Hardgrave by the Newton club with over 500 people in attendance. During the season several prominent Newton players were granted transfers to Mount Albert and this was appealed by the Newton club, though the New Zealand Rugby League Council heard the case and dismissed it.
- Northcote and Birkenhead Ramblers Football Club held their annual meeting at the Buffalo's Hall, Northcote on Tuesday 13 March. The Northcote Borough Council granted the use of the municipal ground at Stafford Park to the Northcote Rugby League team and the Northcote rugby team on alternate Saturday's.
- Otahuhu Rugby League Football Club held their annual meeting in the local Gas Company's hall. The balance-sheet showed that the club was in a sound financial position. Mr. Walter William Massey, M.P., was elected patron, Mr. J. Nicholson elected president, and Mr. J. Clark elected chairman. On 5 July the Ōtāhuhu Borough Council's parks committee reported that it had awarded a contract to install floodlights at a cost of £50 at Sturgess Park. The Otahuhu league club had been given use of the park along with the Otahuhu rugby club, and they tended to alternate the use of it. Both clubs were given permission to collect a charge from spectators on two upcoming match days each provided that the proceeds of one day are divided between the parks committee and charity.
- Papakura Rugby League Football Club They applied for use of Prince Edward Park for the upcoming season and the Papakura Town Board asked for tenders for use of the ground. The chairman of the reserves committee, Mr. G.W. Kerr said that the previous season two applications had been received for the use of the ground and the board had difficulty in deciding which application to grant. The decision was eventually made for them when no other tenders came forward and the ground was granted to Papakura Rugby League for "two guineas for Saturday play". The club was concerned about loss of junior clubs best players to the senior grade clubs. At their annual meeting which was held on 1 March Mr. S.H. Godden was in the chair and Mr. E.C. Foote was elected Patron, and Godden president. In mid April the Papakura club advised Auckland Rugby League that Mr. T. Harrison had been appointed to its committee, other officers appointed were G. Wilton as chairman, A.L. Lewis as secretary, and V. Ashby as treasurer. The balance sheet showed a small credit. Their annual report stated that they had a membership of 70 and had 23 honorary members. The New Zealand Herald reported on the Round 1 Second Grade match between Papakura and Ellerslie, played at Prince Edward Park. The match was won by Papakura 11–0. Mr. S. Billman from the Referees Association reported that there were 79 players and officials at a training night that he had been requested to attend. He said it was a pleasure to note the enthusiasm display. On 30 June the fifth grade team's bus broke down on the way to Victoria Park and the match was called off and awarded to Ponsonby United. After the reason for their late arrival was explained it was decided to replay the match at a later date.
- Point Chevalier League Football Club held their annual meeting at the Point Chevalier Sailing Club Hall on Wednesday, 21 March.
- Ponsonby United Football Club held their 23rd annual meeting at Leys Institute, Ponsonby on Tuesday 6 March. The 24th report in the club's history was submitted and stated that despite some misfortunes the senior team was very young and showed promising signs especially under the coaching of ex-international Frank Delgrosso with Mr. Longbottom as selector. Brian Riley won an award for the most improved back, and Lou Hutt was chosen as the best forward. The club had suffered a financial loss for the 1933 season but had been able through its credit building fund to advance a loan to the Auckland Rugby League of £150 to assist in the grandstand development scheme at Carlaw Park. They elected Mr. A.H. McKeown as patron, Mr. S. McDonald as president, and Mr. C.J.W. Taylor as treasurer. At the 16 May Board of Control meeting of Auckland Rugby League, Ponsonby notified them that Mr. Leonard Riley, former Auckland player had become a coach at Northcote, and that Mr. A. Philburn had been appointed to the Ponsonby Club committee in succession to Mr. R. Allen.
- Richmond Rovers Football Club held their annual meeting at the Gaiety Hall, Surrey Crescent on Monday 5 March. There was a large attendance of players and members with the annual report and balance sheet showing that the club was in a sound financial position. Mr. W.J. Holdsworth was elected Patron, Mr. B.W. Davis president, and Mr. W.A. Swift chairman. Mr. Davis was celebrating his 21st year with the club and it was proposed to mark the occasion with a presentation. There were 28 new playing members registered during the evening.
