= Ron Knight =

Ron Knight may refer to:

- Ron Knight (basketball) (born 1947), American retired NBA player
- Ron Knight (politician) (1932–2021), Canadian politician
- Ron Knight (rugby league) (1915–1947), Australian rugby league footballer

== See also ==
- Ronny Knight, Papua New Guinean politician
