= Jack McConnell (rugby league) =

Australian rugby league footballer

Personal information
- Full name: John James McConnell
- Born: 27 March 1910; Redfern, New South Wales, Australia
- Died: 7 November 1985 (aged 75)

Playing information
- Position: Second-row
Club
Years	Team	Pld	T	G	FG	P
1933–34	Western Suburbs	29	2	0	0	6
1935–36	Canterbury-Bankstown	29	3	0	0	9
	Total	58	5	0	0	15
Representative
Years	Team	Pld	T	G	FG	P
1933–34	NSW City	2	0	0	0	0
- Source: As of 21 February 2019

John James McConnell (27 March 1910 – 7 November 1985), nicknamed "Bluey", was an Australian rugby league footballer who played in the 1930s for Western Suburbs and Canterbury-Bankstown. McConnell was a foundation player for Canterbury-Bankstown.

== Playing career ==
McConnell made his first grade debut for Western Suburbs in Round 3 1933 against Newtown at Marrickville Oval. Western Suburbs only managed to win 4 games in 1933 and finished with the wooden spoon by coming last.

In 1934, McConnell played 17 games as Western Suburbs went from wooden spooners to premiers by claiming the minor premiership and then defeating Eastern Suburbs in the 1934 grand final with McConnell playing at second row. As of 2019, Western Suburbs are the last team to have gone from wooden spooners to premiers the following season.

In 1935, McConnell joined newly admitted Canterbury-Bankstown and played in the club's first ever game against North Sydney at North Sydney Oval on 25 April 1935. Norths went on to win the match 20-5 with McConnell playing at second row.

In 1936, McConnell was a part of the club's first ever finals campaign as Canterbury finished 2nd on the table. Canterbury went on to lose their semi final game against Eastern Suburbs. This in turn would be McConnell's last game in first grade.
