= Ron Knight (rugby league) =

Australian rugby league footballer

Personal information
- Full name: Thomas William Knight
- Born: 22 March 1915
- Died: 21 January 1947 (aged 31)

Playing information
- Position: Centre, Five-eighth, Wing
Club
Years	Team	Pld	T	G	FG	P
1935–38	Western Suburbs	21	5	17	0	49
1941–43	Canterbury-Bankstown	11	4	0	0	12
	Total	32	9	17	0	61

Ron Knight was a rugby league footballer who played for Canterbury-Bankstown and Western Suburbs in the 1930s and 1940s. He was used as a utility and played many positions including as a centre, winger and five-eighth.

== Playing career ==
Knight made his first grade debut for Western Suburbs in 1935 against St George at the Sydney Cricket Ground. Knight spent three seasons with Wests in first grade and two seasons in reserve grade for the club.

In 1941, Knight joined Canterbury-Bankstown and in 1942 played in only one game which was the 1942 NSWRL grand final against Eastern Suburbs. An injury to Roy McCarter meant that Knight was called into the side as a replacement. Canterbury went on to win their second premiership defeating Easts 11–9. Knight played one further season for Canterbury in 1943 before retiring.
