= List of New Zealand national rugby league team players =

There have been 828 rugby league footballers who have played for the New Zealand national rugby league team since the national side started competing internationally in 1907. Players are listed according to the date of their first international test match. The below list is the official roll of honour and only lists players who have played a test match for the Kiwis or have gone away on a tour with the squad. The list does not include players who only played non-tests in New Zealand or who were unused substitutions in test matches. The New Zealand Rugby League omitted Ed St George as early records were poorly kept and it was assumed the "St George" who played for New Zealand in 1932 was Neville St George who debuted for New Zealand in 1925. It was however his younger brother Allen (Ed) St George. He has been added to the NZRL Roll of Honour and given the number 220a.

== List of players ==
No.	Name	Region	Total Tests	Debut	Final Match	World Cups
1	Albert Baskerville	Wellington	2	1907	1908	
2	Conrad Byrne	Wellington	7	1907	1913	
3	Arthur Callum	Wellington	2	1907	1908	
4	Tom Cross	Wellington	8	1907	1908	
5	Charles Dunning	Auckland	2	1907	1912	
6	Daniel Fraser	Wellington	0	1907	1909	
7	Daniel Gilchrist	Wellington	6	1907	1908	
8	Jim Gleeson	Hawkes Bay	1	1907	1908	
9	William Johnston	Otago	8	1907	1908	
10	Arthur Kelly	Wellington	3	1907	1908	
11	Joseph Lavery	Canterbury	1	1907	1908	
12	Adam Lile	Wellington	6	1907	1909	
13	Duncan McGregor	Canterbury	1	1907	1908	
14	Bill Mackrell	Auckland	2	1907	1908	
15	Dally Messenger	Sydney	4	1907	1908	
16	Charlie Pearce	Canterbury	8	1907	1913	
17	Harold Rowe	Auckland	8	1907	1909	
18	George W Smith	Auckland	4	1907	1908	
19	Lance Todd	Auckland	4	1907	1908	
20	Bill Trevarthen	Auckland	9	1907	1909	
21	Hubert Turtill	Canterbury	6	1907	1908	
22	Bill Tyler	Auckland	6	1907	1908	
23	Edward Tyne	Wellington	3	1907	1908	
24	Eric Watkins	Wellington	1	1907	1908	
25	Edgar Wrigley	Wairarapa	8	1907	1908	
26	Hercules Wright	Wellington	4	1907	1908	
27	Dick Wynyard	Auckland	8	1907	1908	
28	Billy Wynyard	Auckland	3	1907	1908	
29	James Barber	Wellington	8	1908	1913	
30	Ernie Buckland	Taranaki	5	1909	1911	
31	Arthur Carlaw	Auckland	4	1909	1913	
32	Kenneth George	Wellington	2	1909	1913	
33	Gordon Hooker	Taranaki	2	1909	1909	
34	Thomas Houghton	Auckland	1	1909	1909	
35	Albert House	Wellington	4	1909	1913	
36	Bert King	Wellington	3	1909	1909	
37	Henry Knight	Wellington	2	1909	1909	
38	Ronald MacDonald	Auckland	5	1909	1911	
39	George Spencer	Wellington	1	1909	1909	
40	John Spencer	Wellington	3	1909	1909	
41	Con Sullivan	Wellington	1	1909	1909	
42	Alf Chorley	Auckland	1	1910	1910	
43	Albert Asher	Auckland	2	1910	1913	
44	Ernie Asher	Auckland	2	1910	1911	
45	Charles James	Nelson	1	1910	1910	
46	Frank Woodward	Bay of Plenty	2	1910	1911	
47	Fred Jackson	Auckland	1	1910	1910	
48	Pat Hannigan	Nelson	1	1910	1910	
49	Jim Griffen	Auckland	1	1910	1910	
50	Ned Hughes	Southland	1	1910	1910	
51	George Seagar	Auckland	2	1910	1911	
52	Tom Cotterill	Hawkes Bay	1	1911	1911	
53	Bert Feary	Nelson	1	1911	1911	
54	Arthur Francis	Auckland	2	1911	1912	
55	George Gillett	Auckland	1	1911	1911	
56	Sid Kean	Auckland	1	1911	1911	
57	Dave Mason	Nelson	1	1911	1911	
58	Walter Milne	Southland	1	1911	1911	
59	Frank Morse	Auckland	1	1911	1911	
60	Jim Rukutai	Auckland	4	1911	1919	
61	Charles Savory	Auckland	3	1911	1914	
62	Roy Siddells	Wellington	2	1911	1913	
63	George Smith	Hawkes Bay	1	1911	1911	
64	Reg Sprague	Waikato	1	1911	1911	
65	Alex Stanaway	Auckland	1	1911	1911	
66	Barney Winder	Thames	1	1911	1911	
67	Jim Gilmour	Wellington	2	1911	1912	
68	Billy Mitchell	Canterbury	5	1911	1920	
69	George Bradley	Wellington	9	1912	1919	
70	Tom Brownlee	Thames	1	1912	1912	
71	Billy Curran	Auckland	2	1912	1912	
72	Billy Dervan	Auckland	0	1912	1912	
73	Dave Evans	Hawkes Bay	1	1912	1912	
74	Arthur Hardgrave	Auckland	2	1912	1914	
75	Harold Hayward	Thames	4	1912	1913	
76	Morgan Hayward	Thames	2	1912	1912	
77	Robert Irvine	Wellington	0	1912	1912	
78	Bill Kelly	Wellington	4	1912	1913	
79	Don Kenealy	Auckland	1	1912	1912	
80	Cecil King	Wellington	3	1912	1913	
81	Lance Moir	Taranaki	1	1912	1912	
82	Charles Webb	Auckland	2	1912	1913	
83	Stan Weston	Auckland	2	1912	1914	
84	Rukingi Reke	Bay of Plenty	2	1912	1913	
85	Henry Du Vall	Hawkes Bay	0	1912	1913	
86	George Cook	Wellington	2	1912	1913	
87	Bob Mitchell	Auckland	4	1912	1914	
88	Jim Auld	Canterbury	1	1913	1913	
89	Les Campbell	Wellington	1	1913	1913	
90	Jim Clark	Auckland	2	1913	1919	
91	Jack Hogan	Wanganui	1	1913	1913	
92	Karl Ifwersen	Auckland	7	1913	1920	
93	Alfred Jackson	Auckland	1	1913	1913	
94	Charles Manning	Hawkes Bay	2	1913	1913	
95	Walter Miller	Wellington	1	1913	1913	
96	Roy Proebstel	Wellington	1	1913	1913	
97	Abbie Shadbolt	Canterbury	2	1913	1921	
98	Stan Walters	Auckland	12	1913	1921	
99	Percy Williams	Wigan	1	1913	1913	
100	Charles Finlayson	Wellington	1	1913	1913	
101	Lawrence Bensemann	Wellington	1	1913	1913	
102	Jim Johnson	Hawkes Bay	1	1913	1913	
103	Billy Wilson	Wellington	4	1914	1921	
104	Frank Barclay	Hawkes Bay	1	1914	1914	
105	Bill Bussell	Canterbury	1	1914	1914	
106	Ernest Button	Canterbury	1	1914	1914	
107	Jim Parker	Taranaki	2	1914	1919	
108	Vic Banks	Hawkes Bay	1	1914	1914	
109	John Brown	West Coast	1	1919	1919	
110	Bill Cloke	Auckland	1	1919	1919	
111	Bill Davidson	Auckland	2	1919	1921	
112	Ernie Herring	Auckland	9	1919	1927	
113	Bert Laing	Auckland	4	1919	1925	
114	Con McCarthy	Hawkes Bay	1	1919	1919	
115	Thomas McClymont	Auckland	6	1919	1924	
116	Dougie McGregor	Auckland	2	1919	1919	
117	Arthur Matthews	Auckland	0	1919	1919	
118	Wally Somers	Auckland	8	1919	1928	
119	Ivan Stewart	Auckland	1	1919	1919	
120	Harry Tancred	Wellington	0	1919	1921	
121	Archie Waddell	Auckland	1	1919	1919	
122	Bill Walsh	Auckland	1	1919	1919	
123	Bill Williams	Auckland	4	1919	1921	
124	Craddock Dufty	Auckland	12	1919	1930	
125	George Iles	Auckland	4	1919	1919	
126	Alec Morris	Wellington	2	1919	1919	
127	John Lang	Auckland	1	1919	1919	
128	Horace Neal	Auckland	1	1919	1919	
129	Sam Lowrie	Auckland	6	1919	1924	
130	Bill King	Canterbury	1	1919	1919	
131	Bert Avery	Auckland	16	1919	1927	
132	Bill Scott	Wellington	4	1919	1920	
133	Jim Sanders	Canterbury	8	1919	1927	
134	Mike Pollock	Wellington	2	1919	1920	
135	Keith Helander	Auckland	1	1919	1919	
136	Tom Haddon	Auckland	2	1919	1919	
137	Nelson Bass	Auckland	5	1919	1921	
138	Charles Woolley	Auckland	4	1920	1921	
139	Eric Grey	Auckland	2	1920	1920	
140	Bill Stormont	Auckland	3	1920	1920	
141	Norm Loveridge	Auckland	1	1920	1920	
142	Bill Guiney	Canterbury	1	1920	1920	
143	Clarrie Polson	Auckland	5	1920	1924	
144	Joe Bennett	Auckland	2	1920	1920	
145	Stan Dobson	Wellington	1	1920	1920	
146	Pat Burrows	Hawkes Bay	1	1921	1921	
147	Frank Delgrosso	Auckland	9	1921	1928	
148	Charlie McElwee	West Coast	1	1921	1921	
149	Joe Meadows	Auckland	0	1921	1921	
150	Horace Nunn	Wellington	0	1921	1921	
151	George Paki	Auckland	1	1921	1921	
152	Bill Stuart	Canterbury	2	1924	1924	
153	Hec Brisbane	Auckland	13	1924	1932	
154	Charles Fitzgerald	Canterbury	2	1924	1924	
155	Terry Gilroy	Canterbury	2	1924	1924	
156	Maurice Wetherill	Auckland	7	1924	1930	
157	Jim O'Brien (Marist)	Auckland	5	1924	1928	
158	Neil Mouat	West Coast	4	1924	1927	
159	Bill Te Whata	Auckland	1	1924	1924	
160	Harry Mullins	Canterbury	1	1924	1924	
161	Bill Devine	Canterbury	3	1924	1927	
162	Lou Petersen	Canterbury	4	1924	1927	
163	Lyall Stewart	Auckland	1	1924	1924	
164	Ted Fitzgerald	Canterbury	1	1924	1924	
165	Hec McDonald	Auckland	1	1924	1924	
166	Lou Brown	Auckland	10	1925	1936	
167	Alphonsus Carroll	Wellington	4	1925	1927	
168	Horace Dixon	Auckland	0	1925	1925	
169	Jack Ellis	Canterbury	1	1925	1925	
170	Tony Green	Canterbury	1	1925	1925	
171	Charles Gregory	Auckland	6	1925	1930	
172	Wilson Hall	Waikato	4	1925	1927	
173	Frank Henry	Canterbury	3	1925	1927	
174	Jack Kirwan	Auckland	5	1925	1927	
175	Jim Parkes	Canterbury	3	1925	1927	
176	Harry Thomas	Otago	3	1925	1927	
177	Stan Webb	Auckland	3	1925	1927	
178	Neville St George	Auckland	2	1925	1925	
179	Arthur Singe	Auckland	3	1925	1926	
180	Ben Davidson	Auckland	4	1925	1932	
181	Ivan Littlewood	Auckland	0	1925	1925	
182	Jim O'Brien (Devonport)	Auckland	0	1925	1925	
183	Hector Cole	Auckland	2	1926	1927	
184	Wally Desmond	Wellington	1	1926	1927	
185	George Gardiner	Auckland	1	1926	1927	
186	Len Mason	Canterbury	3	1926	1927	
187	Joe Menzies	Waikato	1	1926	1927	
188	Jack Wright	West Coast	1	1926	1927	
189	Roy Hardgrave	Auckland	3	1928	1928	
190	Claude List	Auckland	4	1928	1932	
191	Len Scott	Auckland	5	1928	1936	
192	Stan Prentice	Auckland	5	1928	1935	
193	Lou Hutt	Auckland	8	1928	1935	
194	Mick O'Brien	West Coast	4	1928	1932	
195	Tom Timms	Waikato	4	1928	1932	
196	Vern Goodall	West Coast	3	1928	1928	
197	Trevor Hall	Auckland	1	1928	1928	
198	Tim Peckham	Auckland	2	1928	1928	
199	Alf Townsend	Otago	1	1928	1928	
200	Bert Eckhoff	Otago	2	1928	1930	
201	Edwin Abbott F.	Waikato	2	1930	1932	
202	Jim Amos	Canterbury	2	1930	1932	
203	Len Barchard	Auckland	1	1930	1930	
204	Jim Calder	West Coast	9	1930	1936	
205	Stan Clark	Auckland	2	1930	1932	
206	Claude Dobbs	Canterbury	0	1930	1930	
207	Johnny Dodds	West Coast	0	1930	1930	
208	Norm Griffiths	West Coast	1	1930	1930	
209	James Jones	Waikato	1	1930	1930	
210	Ted Meyer	Northland	1	1930	1930	
211	Herbert Pearce	Otago	1	1930	1930	
212	Allan Seagar	Auckland	1	1930	1930	
213	Bob Stephenson	Waikato	3	1930	1932	
214	George Tittleton	Waikato	2	1930	1935	
215	Dick Trautvetter	Waikato	1	1930	1930	
216	Puti Tipene (Steve) Watene	Auckland	6	1930	1937	
217	Albert Laing	Auckland	1	1932	1932	
218	Dick Smith	Auckland	1	1932	1932	
219	Bert Cooke	Auckland	5	1932	1935	
220	Jonas Masters	West Coast	1	1932	1932	
220a	Allen (Ed) St George	Auckland	1	1932	1932	
221	Wilf Hassan	Auckland	1	1932	1932	
222	Ray Lawless	Auckland	3	1932	1935	
223	Gordon Campbell	Auckland	2	1932	1932	
224	Norm Campbell	Auckland	1	1932	1932	
225	Ted Brimble	Auckland	1	1932	1932	
226	Jim Laird	Auckland	4	1932	1935	
227	Alan Clarke	Auckland	1	1932	1932	
228	Arthur Kay	Auckland	8	1935	1939	
229	Ted Mincham	Auckland	3	1935	1936	
230	Roy Powell	Auckland	4	1936	1936	
231	Billy Glynn	West Coast	7	1935	1938	
232	Cliff Satherley	Auckland	3	1935	1935	
233	Harold Tetley	Auckland	5	1935	1938	
234	Cliff Hunt	Taranaki	2	1935	1935	
235	Herbert Lilburne	Wellington	1	1935	1935	
236	Reg Ward	Canterbury	1	1935	1935	
237	Brian Riley	Auckland	2	1935	1937	
238	Alf Mitchell	Auckland	1	1935	1935	
239	Eric Fletcher	Auckland	1	1935	1935	
240	Jack Hemi	Auckland	3	1936	1939	
241	Wally Tittleton	Auckland	6	1935	1939	
242	Tommy Trevarthan	Auckland	2	1936	1936	
243	Joe Cootes	Wellington	6	1936	1939	
244	Bill McNeight	West Coast	3	1936	1938	
245	Frank Pickrang	Auckland	2	1936	1936	
246	Claude Dempsey	Auckland	1	1936	1936	
247	Ces Davison	Canterbury	2	1937	1939	
248	Rangi Chase	Auckland	2	1937	1938	
249	Noel Bickerton	Auckland	2	1937	1937	
250	Frank Halloran	Auckland	2	1937	1937	
251	Angus Gault	Auckland	3	1937	1938	
252	Jack Brodrick	Auckland	3	1937	1938	
253	Jack McLeod	Auckland	2	1937	1938	
254	George Nēpia	Auckland	1	1937	1937	
255	Jack Satherley	Auckland	2	1937	1938	
256	John Anderson	Auckland	1	1938	1938	
257	Walter Brimble	Auckland	1	1938	1938	
258	Wilfred Brimble	Auckland	1	1938	1938	
259	Ray Brown	Canterbury	1	1938	1938	
260	Robert Grotte	Auckland	1	1938	1938	
261	Des Herring	Auckland	1	1938	1938	
262	Clarry McNeil	Auckland	1	1938	1938	
263	Gordon Midgley	Auckland	1	1938	1938	
264	George Orman	West Coast	0	1938	1939	
265	Jack Smith	Auckland	2	1938	1939	
266	Bob Banham	Auckland	1	1939	1939	
267	George Beadle	Waikato	1	1939	1939	
268	George Bellaney	Canterbury	1	1939	1939	
269	Len Brown	Canterbury	1	1939	1939	
270	Jack Campbell	Canterbury	1	1939	1939	
271	Tommy Chase	Auckland	1	1939	1939	
272	John Clark	Canterbury	1	1939	1939	
273	Ross Jones	Auckland	1	1939	1939	
274	Rex King	Canterbury	1	1939	1939	
275	Bert Leatherbarrow	Auckland	1	1939	1939	
276	Arthur McInnarney	Auckland	2	1939	1948	
277	Hawea Mataira	Auckland	1	1939	1939	
278	Harold Milliken	Auckland	1	1939	1939	
279	Laurie Mills	Auckland	1	1939	1939	
280	George Mitchell	Auckland	1	1939	1939	
281	Pita Ririnui	Auckland	1	1939	1939	
282	Verdun Scott	Auckland	1	1939	1939	
283	Dave Solomon	Auckland	1	1939	1939	
284	Ivor Stirling	Auckland	1	1939	1939	
285	Warwick Clarke	Auckland	11	1946	1949	
286	Roy Nurse	Auckland	1	1946	1946	
287	Len Jordan	Auckland	8	1946	1949	
288	Maurie Robertson	Auckland	18	1946	1952	
289	Bill Mountford	West Coast	1	1946	1946	
290	Roy Clark	Auckland	3	1946	1948	
291	Rex Cunningham	Auckland	4	1946	1948	
292	John Newton	West Coast	13	1946	1950	
293	Bob Aynsley	West Coast	6	1946	1949	
294	Bruce Graham	Auckland	1	1946	1946	
295	Arthur Gillman	Canterbury	2	1946	1948	
296	Charlie McBride	West Coast	21	1946	1952	
297	Travers Hardwick	Auckland	14	1946	1952	
298	Ron McGregor	Auckland	5	1947	1948	
299	Abbie Graham	Auckland	4	1947	1949	
300	Jimmy Haig	Canterbury	21	1947	1954	
301	Pat Smith	Canterbury	10	1947	1949	
302	George Davidson	Auckland	17	1947	1953	
303	Joffre Johnson	Auckland	4	1947	1948	
304	Ray Nuttall	West Coast	0	1947	1948	
305	Bill McKenzie	Canterbury	5	1947	1952	
306	Jack Forrest	West Coast	12	1947	1952	
307	Des Barchard	Auckland	8	1947	1952	
308	Les Pye	Auckland	2	1947	1948	
309	Claude Hancox	Auckland	1	1947	1948	
310	Ken Mountford	West Coast	6	1947	1948	
311	Doug Anderson	Auckland	3	1947	1954	1954
312	Allan Wiles	Auckland	1	1948	1948	
313	Allen Laird	Auckland	1	1948	1948	
314	Clarence Hurndell	Auckland	6	1947	1950	
315	Morrie Rich	Auckland	1	1948	1948	
316	Vic Belsham	Auckland	1	1948	1948	
317	Albert Hambleton	Waikato	2	1948	1948	
318	Joe Duke	Canterbury	0	1948	1948	
319	Dave Redmond	Auckland	4	1948	1949	
320	Tommy Baxter	Auckland	29	1949	1956	
321	Jack Russell-Green	Auckland	3	1949	1952	
322	Ron Westerby	Wellington	1	1949	1949	
323	Des White	Auckland	21	1950	1956	
324	Bevin Hough	Auckland	12	1950	1953	
325	Cliff Johnson	Auckland	34	1950	1960	1954, 1957, 1960
326	George Menzies	West Coast	28	1951	1961	1954, 1957, 1960
327	Doug Richards-Jolley	Auckland	2	1951	1952	
328	Ken English	Wellington	2	1951	1952	
329	Graham Burgoyne	Auckland	1	1951	1952	
330	Frank Mulcare	West Coast	18	1951	1956	
331	Jimmy Edwards	Auckland	17	1951	1954	1954
332	Bruce Robertson	Auckland	5	1951	1956	
333	Lory Blanchard	Canterbury	16	1951	1956	1954
334	Bill McLennan	West Coast	28	1951	1957	1954, 1957
335	Joe Curtain	Canterbury	1	1951	1952	
336	Alister Atkinson	Canterbury	24	1951	1956	1954
337	Andy Berryman	Waikato	1	1951	1952	
338	Bill Sorensen	Auckland	22	1951	1960	1954, 1957, 1960
339	Cyril Eastlake	Auckland	28	1951	1960	1954, 1960
340	Johnny Dodd	Wellington	0	1951	1952	
341	Ray Cranch	Auckland	1	1951	1952	
342	Harvey Kreyl	Wellington	1	1952	1952	
343	Bob O'Donnell	West Coast	0	1952	1952	
344	Ron McKay	Taranaki	17	1952	1956	1954
345	Cliff Harris	Auckland	1	1952	1952	
346	Roy Moore	Auckland	7	1952	1956	
347	Alan Riechelmann	Auckland	1	1952	1952	
348	Bob Neilson	West Coast	3	1952	1953	
349	Joe Ratima	Auckland	6	1952	1959	
350	Roy Roff	Auckland	2	1952	1954	
351	John Bond	Canterbury	8	1953	1956	1954
352	Cyril Paskell	Canterbury	1	1953	1953	
353	Vern Bakalich	Auckland	13	1953	1957	1957
354	Ron Ackland	Auckland	19	1954	1963	1957
355	Jock Butterfield	Canterbury	36	1954	1963	1954, 1957, 1960
356	Jim Austin	Auckland	2	1954	1954	1954
357	Len Eriksen	Auckland	3	1954	1954	1954
358	John Yates	Auckland	6	1954	1957	1954, 1957
359	Neville Denton	Auckland	13	1954	1963	1954, 1957, 1960
360	Ian Grey	Auckland	3	1954	1956	1954
361	George McDonald	Waikato	6	1954	1956	1954
362	Bob Hawes	West Coast	3	1955	1956	
363	Pat Creedy	Canterbury	10	1955	1957	1957
364	Jim Riddell	Auckland	9	1955	1957	1957
365	Dick Haggie	Auckland	4	1955	1956	
366	Keith Roberts	Canterbury	14	1955	1960	1960
367	Sel Belsham	Auckland	10	1955	1957	1957
368	Rex Percy	Auckland	10	1955	1959	1957
369	Trevor Kilkelly	Canterbury	11	1955	1960	1960
370	Henry Maxwell	Auckland	20	1955	1960	1957, 1960
371	Les McNicol	West Coast	1	1955	1956	
372	Reese Griffiths	West Coast	13	1956	1963	1957, 1960
373	Duncan MacRae	Auckland	3	1956	1956	
374	Arnold Green	West Coast	1	1956	1956	
375	Tom Hadfield	Auckland	18	1956	1961	1957, 1960
376	John Lasher	Auckland	1	1956	1956	
377	Joe Murray	Auckland	1	1956	1956	
378	Gordon Moncur	Auckland	1	1956	1956	
379	Ossie Butt	Wellington	1	1956	1956	
380	George P Turner	Auckland	13	1957	1961	1957, 1960
381	Kevin Pearce	Canterbury	1	1957	1957	1957
382	Keith Bell	Auckland	1	1957	1957	1957
383	Brian Reidy	Auckland	21	1959	1966	
384	Mel Cooke	Canterbury	23	1959	1964	1960
385	Gary Phillips	Auckland	8	1959	1963	1960
386	Peter Turner	Wellington	1	1959	1959	
387	Murray Paterson	Auckland	1	1959	1959	
388	Ean Anderson	Canterbury	1	1959	1959	
389	Graham Kennedy	West Coast	23	1959	1966	
390	Brian Campbell	Auckland	2	1959	1959	
391	Bill Snowden	Auckland	20	1959	1965	
392	Bill Hattaway	Auckland	1	1959	1959	
393	Don Hammond	Auckland	22	1959	1965	
394	Bill Schultz	Auckland	5	1959	1965	
395	Laurie Olliff	Auckland	1	1960	1960	1960
396	Tom Reid	West Coast	3	1960	1961	1960
397	Reg Cooke	Auckland	8	1960	1964	1960
398	Graeme Farrar	Waikato	4	1961	1966	
399	Maunga Emery	Auckland	24	1961	1966	
400	Jim Patterson	Auckland	2	1961	1961	
401	Jack Fagan	Auckland	18	1961	1965	
402	Roger Bailey	Auckland	30	1961	1970	
403	Sam Edwards	Auckland	19	1961	1966	
404	Brian Lee	Auckland	9	1961	1968	1968
405	Allen Amer	Canterbury	1	1961	1961	
406	Neville Tiller	West Coast	1	1961	1961	
407	Bruce Castle	Auckland	2	1961	1967	
408	Billy Harrison	Wellington	2	1961	1961	
409	Ken McCracken	Auckland	8	1961	1964	
410	Jim Ford	Auckland	1	1961	1961	
411	Jim Bond	Canterbury	15	1961	1968	1968
412	Rata Harrison	Auckland	2	1961	1961	
413	Ron Duffy	Auckland	0	1961	1961	
414	Gary Bailey	Auckland	1	1961	1961	
415	Reg Hart	West Coast	1	1961	1961	
416	Tony Smith	Canterbury	1	1962	1962	
417	Fred White	Taranaki	1	1963	1963	
418	Doug Ellwood	Auckland	7	1963	1968	1968
419	John Sparnon	Auckland	1	1963	1963	
420	Gary Woollard	Auckland	12	1963	1971	1970
421	Ray Sinel	Auckland	11	1963	1969	1968
422	Colin McMaster	West Coast	2	1963	1968	1968
423	Jim Fisher	Canterbury	9	1963	1972	
424	Ken George	Auckland	1	1963	1963	
425	Gary Blackler	Canterbury	5	1963	1964	
426	Pat White	Canterbury	4	1964	1965	
427	Eddie Moore	Auckland	7	1964	1966	
428	John Bray	Canterbury	2	1964	1964	
429	Ian Drayton	Canterbury	1	1964	1964	
430	George H Turner	Canterbury	1	1964	1964	
431	Ernie Wiggs	Auckland	5	1964	1968	1968
432	Graham Mattson	Auckland	3	1964	1965	
433	Brian Langton	Canterbury	4	1965	1965	
434	Paul Schultz	Auckland	9	1965	1968	1968
435	Roy Christian	Auckland	32	1965	1972	1970, 1972
436	Colin O'Neil	Wellington	21	1965	1971	1970
437	Robin Scholefield	West Coast	2	1965	1965	
438	Kevin Dixon	West Coast	10	1965	1970	1968
439	John Walshe	Otago	1	1965	1965	
440	Roger Tait	Waikato	11	1965	1968	1968
441	Robin Strong	Wellington	1	1965	1965	
442	Bob Irvine	Canterbury	7	1965	1967	
443	Robert Orchard	Bay of Plenty	18	1965	1972	
444	Leo Brown	West Coast	1	1965	1965	
445	Bill Deacon	Waikato	14	1965	1971	1970
446	Jim White	Canterbury	1	1965	1965	
447	Bob Mincham	Auckland	4	1966	1968	1968
448	Garry Smith	Wellington	16	1966	1971	1968, 1970
449	Willie Southorn	Taranaki	2	1966	1967	
450	Ted Baker	Waikato	4	1966	1967	
451	Gary Clarke	Canterbury	3	1966	1968	1968
452	Wayne White	Waikato	1	1967	1967	
453	Graham Brown	Auckland	1	1967	1967	
454	Oscar Danielson	Auckland	5	1967	1969	1968
455	Henry Tatana	Auckland	10	1967	1971	1968
456	Ron Ballantyne	Northland	1	1967	1967	
457	Lester Mills	Auckland	1	1967	1967	
458	Ricky Carey	Auckland	1	1967	1967	
459	Tony Kriletich	Auckland	22	1967	1972	1968, 1970
460	Bill Noonan	Canterbury	3	1967	1969	
461	Len Morgan	Auckland	1	1967	1967	
462	Spencer Dunn	Canterbury	2	1968	1968	1968
463	Eric Carson	Auckland	3	1968	1970	1968
464	Don Parkinson	Waikato	1	1968	1968	1968
465	Don Ladner	West Coast	8	1969	1970	1970
466	Mocky Brereton	West Coast	24	1969	1975	1970, 1972
467	Sam Rolleston	Wellington	1	1969	1969	
468	Ray Wilson	Auckland	2	1969	1972	
469	Dennis Key	Auckland	1	1969	1969	
470	Trevor Patrick	Otago	2	1969	1970	
471	Graeme Cooksley	Canterbury	7	1969	1972	1970, 1972
472	Rodney Walker	Canterbury	4	1969	1972	1972
473	John Hibbs	West Coast	6	1969	1975	
474	Brian Clark	Auckland	2	1969	1969	1970, 1972
475	Phillip Orchard	Bay of Plenty	21	1969	1975	1972, 1975
476	Doug Gailey	Auckland	19	1969	1974	
477	Bernie Lowther	Auckland	9	1970	1971	1970
478	Fred Schuster	Auckland	1	1970	1970	
479	Wayne Redmond	Auckland	1	1970	1970	
480	Ray Williams	Auckland	2	1970	1971	
481	Bob McGuinn	Auckland	3	1970	1971	1970
482	Eddie Heatley	Auckland	3	1970	1971	
483	Lummy Graham	Auckland	3	1970	1970	1970
484	John Greengrass	Canterbury	18	1970	1975	1970, 1975
485	John Whittaker	Wellington	26	1970	1982	1970, 1972, 1975, 1977
486	Elliot Kereopa	Midlands	2	1970	1970	1970
487	Bill Burgoyne	Auckland	6	1970	1974	1970, 1972
488	Mike McClennan	Auckland	2	1971	1971	
489	Ken Stirling	Auckland	22	1971	1978	1975
490	Dennis Williams	Auckland	31	1971	1981	1972, 1975, 1977
491	Murray Eade	Auckland	15	1971	1978	1972, 1975
492	Don Mann	Auckland	5	1971	1974	
493	John O'Sullivan	Auckland	10	1971	1975	1972, 1975
494	Dave Sorensen	Auckland	2	1971	1972	
495	Shane Dowsett	Auckland	1	1971	1972	
496	Warren Collicoat	Auckland	16	1972	1979	1972, 1975, 1977
497	Bob Paul	Wellington	3	1972	1972	1972
498	Angus Thompson	Canterbury	1	1972	1972	
499	Richard Bolton	Auckland	1	1972	1972	
500	Brian Tracey	Auckland	3	1972	1972	1972
501	Mita Mohi	Canterbury	1	1972	1972	1972
502	Peter Gurnick	Auckland	8	1972	1975	1972, 1975
503	Tony Coll	West Coast	30	1972	1982	1972, 1975, 1977
504	John Wilson	Auckland	2	1972	1972	1972
505	Bill Johnsen	West Coast	3	1974	1974	
506	Eddie Kerrigan	Canterbury	3	1974	1974	
507	Lyndsay Proctor	Auckland	13	1974	1978	1975, 1977
508	Wayne Robertson	Auckland	3	1974	1974	
509	Bob Jarvis	Auckland	9	1974	1975	1975
510	Murray Wright	Auckland	1	1975	1975	
511	John Wright	Auckland	2	1975	1978	
512	Barrie Dyer	Auckland	0	1975	1975	
513	Kevin Potter	Auckland	1	1974	1974	
514	Don Munro	Wellington	4	1975	1975	1975
515	Kevin Barry	Auckland	1	1975	1975	
516	Tom Conroy	Auckland	8	1975	1975	1975
517	Graeme West	Taranaki	18	1975	1985	
518	Josh Liavaa	Auckland	1	1975	1975	
519	Ray Baxendale	West Coast	16	1975	1981	1975, 1977
520	Dane Sorensen	Auckland	18	1975	1985	1975, 1977
521	Paul Matete	Auckland	1	1975	1975	1975
522	Fred Ah Kuoi	Auckland	28	1975	1985	1975, 1977
523	John Smith	Auckland	12	1975	1979	1975, 1977
524	Kurt Sorensen	Auckland	27	1975	1989	1975, 1977, 1988
525	Bruce Dickison	Canterbury	6	1975	1980	1975
526	Tony Gordon	Auckland	3	1975	1975	1975
527	Les Beehre	Auckland	1	1975	1975	1975
528	Dane O'Hara	Auckland	36	1977	1986	1977
529	Olsen Filipaina	Auckland	29	1977	1986	1977
530	Chris Jordan	Auckland	5	1977	1978	1977
531	Kevin Fisher	Waikato	8	1977	1982	1977
532	Whetu Henry	Wellington	4	1977	1978	1977
533	Alan Rushton	Canterbury	13	1977	1981	1977
534	Whare Henry	Wellington	2	1977	1977	1977
535	Mark Graham	Auckland	29	1977	1988	1977, 1988
536	Michael O'Donnell	Canterbury	10	1977	1981	1977
537	Nick Wright	Auckland	3	1978	1983	
538	Warren Winter	Auckland	1	1978	1978	
539	Steve McGregor	Auckland	1	1978	1978	
540	Glenn Taylor	Auckland	1	1978	1978	
541	Ian Bell	Auckland	4	1978	1983	
542	Gary Prohm	Auckland	24	1978	1986	
543	Shane Varley	Auckland	12	1978	1984	
544	Barry Edkins	Canterbury	6	1978	1980	
545	Toa Fepuleai	Auckland	4	1978	1980	
546	Dick Uluave	Manawatu	2	1979	1979	
547	James Leuluai	Auckland	29	1979	1986	
548	Gordon Smith	West Coast	14	1979	1983	
549	Mark Broadhurst	Canterbury	17	1979	1983	
550	Howie Tamati	Taranaki	24	1979	1985	
551	Kevin Tamati	Wellington	22	1979	1985	
552	Lewis Hudson	Canterbury	4	1979	1982	
553	Paul Ravlich	Waikato	1	1979	1979	
554	Paul Te Ariki	Wellington	2	1980	1980	
555	Gary Kemble	Auckland	19	1980	1986	
556	Bernie Green	West Coast	1	1980	1980	
557	Nolan Tupaea	Wellington	1	1980	1980	
558	Rick Muru	Waikato	1	1980	1980	
559	Bruce Gall	Taranaki	4	1980	1982	
560	Bill Kells	Waikato	1	1980	1980	
561	Danny Campbell	Northland	1	1980	1980	
562	Wally Wilson	Canterbury	1	1981	1981	
563	Clayton Friend	Auckland	24	1982	1991	1988
564	Peter Mellars	Wellington	1	1982	1982	
565	Mark Gillespie	Auckland	1	1982	1982	
566	Hugh McGahan	Auckland	32	1982	1990	
567	Owen Wright	Auckland	16	1982	1986	
568	Gerard Stokes	Canterbury	1	1982	1982	
569	John Griffin	West Coast	1	1982	1982	
570	Wayne Dwyer	West Coast	0	1982	1982	
571	David Field	Canterbury	1	1982	1982	
572	Joe Ropati	Auckland	11	1983	1987	
573	Ron O'Regan	Auckland	8	1983	1986	
574	Dean Bell	Auckland	26	1983	1989	1988
575	Robin Alfeld	Canterbury	1	1983	1983	
576	Marty Crequer	Canterbury	4	1983	1986	
577	Frank Tinitelia	Auckland	1	1983	1983	
578	Dean Orr	Auckland	1	1983	1983	
579	John Ackland	Auckland	1	1983	1983	
580	Riki Cowan	Auckland	6	1984	1985	
581	Mark Elia	Auckland	11	1985	1989	1988
582	Vaun O'Callaghan	Waikato	0	1985	1985	
583	Mark Bourneville	Auckland	1	1985	1985	
584	Shane Cooper	Auckland	12	1985	1989	1988
585	Adrian Shelford	Canterbury	9	1985	1989	1988
586	Darrell Williams	Auckland	21	1985	1990	1988
587	Shane Horo	Waikato	4	1985	1988	1988
588	Glen Gibb	West Coast	1	1985	1985	
589	Wayne Wallace	Canterbury	12	1985	1989	1988
590	James Goulding	Auckland	6	1985	1989	
591	Sam Stewart	Wellington	16	1985	1989	1988
592	Ross Taylor	Canterbury	3	1985	1987	
593	Brent Todd	Canterbury	28	1985	1993	
594	Glenn Donaldson	Bay of Plenty	0	1986	1986	
595	Barry Harvey	Taranaki	4	1986	1989	
596	Tea Ropati	Auckland	9	1986	1997	
597	Dean Lonergan	Auckland	12	1986	1991	
598	Gary Mercer	Bay of Plenty	22	1986	1993	1988
599	Gary Freeman	Auckland	46	1986	1995	1988, 1995
600	Peter Brown	Auckland	17	1986	1991	1988
601	George Lajpold	Wellington	1	1987	1987	
602	Sam Panapa	Auckland	9	1987	1991	
603	Mark Horo	Auckland	16	1987	1996	1988, 1995
604	Kevin Iro	Auckland	34	1987	1998	1988, 1995
605	Esene Faimalo	Canterbury	5	1988	1991	1988
606	Tony Iro	Auckland	25	1988	1998	1988, 1995
607	Tony Kemp	Wellington	25	1989	1995	1995
608	Brendon Tuuta	Canterbury	17	1989	1995	
609	Duane Mann	Auckland	29	1989	1994	
610	Phil Bancroft	Auckland	2	1989	1989	
611	Kurt Sherlock	Sydney Roosters	4	1989	1989	
612	Dave Watson	Auckland	9	1989	1991	
613	Kelly Shelford	Auckland	9	1989	1991	
614	Tawera Nikau	Auckland	19	1989	1997	
615	Morvin Edwards	Wellington	12	1989	1993	
616	Whetu Taewa	Canterbury	8	1989	1995	
617	Dean Clark	Auckland	7	1989	1992	
618	Francis Leota	Auckland	3	1989	1990	
619	Mike Kuiti	Wellington	6	1989	1992	
620	George Mann	Auckland	9	1989	1991	
621	David Ewe	Wellington	1	1989	1989	
622	Matthew Ridge	Auckland	25	1990	1998	1995
623	Paddy Tuimavave	Auckland	2	1990	1990	
624	Mark Nixon	Canterbury	2	1990	1993	
625	Mike Patton	Auckland	6	1990	1991	
626	Frano Botica	Wigan	7	1991	1993	
627	Jarrod McCracken	Auckland	22	1991	1999	
628	Richard Blackmore	Auckland	25	1991	2000	1995, 2000
629	Emosi Koloto	Widnes	5	1991	1991	
630	Jason Williams	Canterbury	13	1991	1995	1995
631	Sean Hoppe	Auckland	35	1992	2002	1995
632	Brent Stuart	Canterbury	14	1992	1995	
633	Gavin Hill	Bulldogs	5	1992	1993	
634	Quentin Pongia	Canterbury	36	1992	2000	1995, 2000
635	Daryl Halligan	North Sydney	20	1992	1998	
636	Mark Woods	Wellington	3	1992	1992	
637	Se'e Solomona	Auckland	4	1993	1993	
638	Jason Donnelly	Waikato	3	1993	1993	
639	John Lomax	Wellington	16	1993	1998	1995
640	Stephen Kearney	Wellington	45	1993	2004	1995, 2000
641	Iva Ropati	Auckland	3	1993	1993	
642	Gene Ngamu	Auckland	23	1993	1999	1995
643	Jason Mackie	Northland	5	1993	1993	
644	Robert Piva	Wellington	1	1993	1993	
645	Logan Edwards	Canterbury	5	1993	1995	
646	Peter Edwards	Wellington	1	1993	1993	
647	Blair Harding	Canterbury	0	1993	1993	
648	Aaron Whittaker	Canterbury	3	1993	1994	
649	Denvour Johnston	Wellington	2	1993	1993	
650	Jason Lowrie	Auckland	17	1993	2000	1995
651	Simon Angell	Canterbury	1	1993	1993	
652	David Lomax	Wellington	2	1993	1993	
653	Paul Johnson	Canterbury	0	1993	1993	
654	Henry Paul	Auckland	25	1993	2001	1995, 2000
655	Ruben Wiki	Auckland	55	1994	2008	1995, 2000
656	Terry Hermansson	Canterbury	4	1994	1999	
657	Tony Tatupu	Auckland	3	1994	1995	
658	Tyran Smith	South Sydney	9	1994	2000	
659	Hitro Okesene	Auckland	5	1994	1995	1995
660	Mike Dorreen	Hawkes Bay	0	1994	1994	
661	Syd Eru	Wellington	18	1995	1998	1995
662	John Timu	Bulldogs	9	1995	1997	
663	Tony Tuimavave	Auckland	1	1995	1995	
664	Richie Barnett	Auckland	26	1995	2000	1995, 2000
665	Stacey Jones	Auckland	41	1995	2006	1995, 2000
666	Grant Young	South Queensland	6	1996	1997	
667	Marc Ellis	Auckland	5	1996	1996	
668	Joe Vagana	Auckland	25	1996	2000	2000
669	Logan Swann	Auckland	28	1996	2004	2000
670	Anthony Swann	Auckland	1	1996	1996	
671	Robbie Paul	Auckland	28	1997	2006	2000
672	Nigel Vagana	Auckland	38	1998	2006	2000
673	Nathan Cayless	Parramatta	36	1998	2008	2000, 2008
674	Tony Puletua	Auckland	19	1998	2005	2000
675	Craig Smith	Illawarra	12	1998	2001	2000
676	Lesley Vainikolo	Auckland	15	1998	2006	
677	Ali Lauitiiti	Auckland	20	1998	2006	2000
678	Willie Talau	Taranaki	12	1999	2006	2000
679	David Kidwell	Canterbury	20	1999	2008	2008
680	Richard Swain	Melbourne	20	1999	2003	2000
681	Matt Rua	Auckland	11	1999	2001	2000
682	Brian Jellick	Auckland	3	1999	2000	2000
683	Tasesa Lavea	Melbourne	4	2000	2001	2000
684	Tonie Carroll	Brisbane	5	2000	2000	2000
685	David Vaealiki	Canterbury	7	2000	2003	2000
686	Motu Tony	Auckland	12	2001	2006	
687	Henry Fa'afili	Auckland	10	2001	2006	
688	Clinton Toopi	Auckland	21	2001	2007	
689	Francis Meli	Auckland	15	2001	2004	
690	Henry Perenara	Auckland	1	2001	2001	
691	Monty Betham	Auckland	9	2001	2006	
692	Jerry Seuseu	Auckland	11	2001	2004	
693	David Solomona	Auckland	7	2001	2006	
694	Matt Utai	Auckland	4	2002	2005	
695	Lance Hohaia	Waikato	29	2002	2011	2008
696	Paul Rauhihi	Wellington	17	2002	2005	
697	Andrew Lomu	Sydney Roosters	1	2002	2002	
698	Awen Guttenbeil	Auckland	10	2002	2005	
699	Jason Cayless	Sydney Roosters	10	2002	2006	
700	Michael Smith	Castleford	1	2002	2002	
701	Joe Galuvao	Auckland	4	2003	2004	
702	Vinnie Anderson	Auckland	6	2003	2006	
703	Sione Faumuina	Auckland	3	2003	2005	
704	Thomas Leuluai	Auckland	37	2003	2017	2008, 2013, 2017
705	Paul Whatuira	Wellington	16	2004	2007	
706	Sonny Bill Williams	Auckland	12	2004	2013	2013
707	Tevita Latu	Auckland	1	2004	2004	
708	Brent Webb	Auckland	16	2004	2008	
709	Louis Anderson	Auckland	13	2004	2006	
710	Roy Asotasi	Auckland	18	2004	2009	
711	Shontayne Hape	Auckland	8	2004	2006	
712	Jamahl Lolesi	Auckland	2	2004	2005	
713	Dene Halatau	Southland	11	2004	2009	2008
714	Alex Chan	Melbourne	3	2004	2006	
715	Wairangi Koopu	Auckland	3	2004	2005	
716	Jerome Ropati	Auckland	11	2005	2009	2008
717	Benji Marshall	Wests Tigers	29	2005	2012	2008
718	Frank Pritchard	Penrith	26	2005	2013	2013
719	Jake Webster	Melbourne	7	2005	2006	
720	Manu Vatuvei	Auckland	28	2005	2015	2008, 2013
721	David Faiumu	North Queensland	5	2005	2006	
722	Iafeta Paleaaesina	Auckland	3	2005	2006	
723	Bronson Harrison	Wests Tigers	13	2005	2011	2008
724	Willie Poching	Leeds	1	2005	2005	
725	Tame Tupou	Brisbane	4	2006	2007	
726	David Fa'alogo	South Sydney	11	2006	2009	2008
727	Ben Roberts	Bulldogs	5	2006	2007	
728	Harrison Hansen	Wigan	1	2006	2006	
729	Iosia Soliola	Auckland	12	2006	2009	
730	Steve Matai	Auckland	11	2006	2010	2008
731	Simon Mannering	Wellington	44	2006	2017	2008, 2013, 2017
732	Adam Blair	Melbourne	44	2006	2017	2008, 2017
733	Nathan Fien	Auckland	20	2006	2012	2008
734	Epalahame Lauaki	Auckland	2	2007	2007	
735	Krisnan Inu	Parramatta	6	2007	2013	2008, 2013
736	Sam Rapira	Waikato	13	2007	2011	2008
737	Greg Eastwood	Brisbane	28	2007	2016	2008, 2013
738	Luke Covell	Cronulla	1	2007	2007	
739	Taniela Tuiaki	Auckland	4	2007	2007	
740	Jeremy James Smith	South Sydney	3	2007	2007	
741	Fuifui Moimoi	Auckland	12	2007	2011	
742	Jeremy Jon Oscar Smith	Melbourne	24	2007	2012	2008
743	Jeff Lima	Wests Tigers	7	2007	2009	
744	Sam Perrett	Sydney Roosters	21	2007	2013	2008
745	Chase Stanley	St.George-Illawarra	2	2007	2007	
746	Shaun Kenny-Dowall	Sydney Roosters	21	2007	2016	
747	Jason Nightingale	St.George-Illawarra	33	2008	2017	2008, 2013, 2017
748	Setaimata Sa	Canterbury	4	2008	2008	2008
749	Issac Luke	Taranaki	42	2008	2017	2008, 2013
750	Sika Manu	Wellington	14	2008	2011	2008
751	Evarn Tuimavave	Auckland	1	2008	2008	2008
752	Bryson Goodwin	Bulldogs	10	2009	2013	2013
753	Junior Sa'u	Newcastle	9	2009	2010	
754	Frank-Paul Nu'uausala	Auckland	15	2009	2013	2013
755	Jared Waerea-Hargreaves	Manly	23	2009	2017	2013, 2017
756	Ben Matulino	Wellington	23	2009	2015	2013
757	Kieran Foran	Manly Sea Eagles	23	2009	2022	2013
758	Kevin Locke	Auckland	8	2009	2013	2013
759	Eddy Pettybourne	South Sydney	0	2009	2009	
760	Aaron Heremaia	Auckland	1	2010	2010	
761	Zeb Taia	Newcastle	1	2010	2010	
762	Lewis Brown	Canterbury	15	2010	2016	
763	Sam McKendry	Auckland	8	2010	2013	
764	Antonio Winterstein	Auckland	0	2010	2010	
765	Matt Duffie	Auckland	1	2011	2011	
766	Kalifa Faifai Loa	Auckland	2	2011	2011	
767	Gerard Beale	Brisbane	11	2011	2017	2017
768	Russell Packer	Manawatu	7	2011	2017	2017
769	Alex Glenn	Auckland	12	2011	2015	2013
770	Elijah Taylor	Northland	11	2011	2017	2013, 2017
771	Kevin Proctor	Auckland	17	2011	2017	
772	Bill Tupou	Auckland	0	2011	2011	
773	Josh Hoffman	Brisbane	5	2012	2013	2013
774	Shaun Johnson	Auckland	32	2012	2019	2013, 2017
775	Jesse Bromwich	Melbourne Storm	30	2012	2022	2013
776	Dean Whare	Auckland	19	2012	2017	2013, 2017
777	Sam Kasiano	Auckland	6	2012	2013	2013
778	Tohu Harris	Hawke's Bay	16	2013	2016	
779	Roger Tuivasa-Sheck	Auckland	16	2013	2017	2013, 2017
780	Sam Moa	Sydney Roosters	9	2013	2016	2013
781	Peta Hiku	Auckland	12	2014	2017	2022
782	Isaac John	Waikato	1	2014	2014	
783	Ben Henry	Auckland	1	2014	2014	
784	Siliva Havili	Auckland	1	2014	2014	
785	Martin Taupau	Wests Tigers	20	2014	2017	2017
786	Jason Taumalolo	Auckland	10	2014	2017	
787	Suaia Matagi	Auckland	1	2014	2014	
788	Sosaia Feki	Auckland	0	2014	2014	
789	Bodene Thompson	Auckland	0	2014	2014	
790	Jordan Kahu	Wellington	9	2015	2017	
791	Tuimoala Lolohea	Auckland	1	2015	2015	
792	Sio Siua Taukeiaho	Auckland	1	2015	2015	
793	Kodi Nikorima	Brisbane	8	2015	2017	2017
794	Dallin Watene-Zelezniak	Waikato	6	2016	2017	2017
795	Manu Ma'u	Auckland	6	2016	2016	
796	Kenny Bromwich	Melbourne Storm	11	2016	2022	2017
797	Solomone Kata	Auckland	5	2016	2016	
798	Jordan Rapana	Auckland	12	2016	2022	2017
799	David Fusitu'a	Auckland	2	2016	2016	
800	Joseph Tapine	Canberra Raiders	12	2016	2022	2017
801	James Fisher-Harris	Penrith Panthers	7	2016	2022	
802	Te Maire Martin	Waikato	3	2016	2017	2017
803	Brad Takairangi	Parramatta Eels	4	2017	2017	2017
804	Nelson Asofa-Solomona	Melbourne Storm	6	2017	2022	2017
805	Isaac Liu	Auckland	3	2015	2017	2017
806	Danny Levi	Wellington	4	2017	2017	2017
807	Addin Fonua-Blake	Manly	1	2017	2017	2017
808	Jamayne Isaako	Brisbane	5	2018	2018	
809	Esan Marsters	Wests Tigers	6	2018	2019	
810	Ken Maumalo	Auckland	9	2018	2018	
811	Raymond Faitala-Mariner	Bulldogs	1	2018	2018	
812	Leeson Ah Mau	St George	9	2018	2019	
813	Herman Ese'ese	Newcastle Knights	1	2018	2018	
814	Slade Griffin	Newcastle Knights	1	2018	2018	
815	Joseph Manu	Sydney Roosters	9	2018	2022	
816	Brandon Smith	Melbourne Storm	8	2018	2022	
817	Isaiah Papali'i	Auckland	2	2018	2022	
818	Briton Nikora	Cronulla Sharks	4	2019	2022	
819	Jahrome Hughes	Melbourne Storm	4	2019	2022	
820	Charnze Nicoll-Klokstad	Canberra	3	2019	2019	
821	Zane Tetevano	Sydney Roosters	3	2019	2019	
822	Braden Hamlin-Uele	Cronulla	1	2019	2019	
823	Corey Harawira-Naera	Bulldogs	3	2019	2019	
824	Ronaldo Mulitalo	Cronulla Sharks	1	2022	2022	
825	Marata Niukore	Parramatta Eels	1	2022	2022	
826	Dylan Brown	Parramatta Eels	1	2022	2022	
827	Moses Leota	Penrith Panthers	1	2022	2022	

== Dual internationals ==
Several of the original New Zealand team had already represented New Zealand in rugby union. This trend has continued with many players representing New Zealand in two sports or representing two different countries in rugby league due to the eligibility rules in place at the time. For example, Dally Messenger represented Australia in both rugby union and rugby league as well as playing with the 1907 touring side.

Of the 36 players that have played for both the Kiwis and the All Blacks, only Karl Ifwersen, Sonny Bill Williams, and Roger Tuivasa-Sheck have been a Kiwi before they became an All Black.

As well as the dual internationals below, Charles Savory won the New Zealand National Amateur Heavyweight Boxing championship in 1914, while Sonny Bill Williams won the New Zealand Professional Boxing Association Heavyweight Championship in 2012.

Charles Finlayson was Kiwi #100 and played for the Kiwis in 1913. Then in 1928 he played for New Zealand at cricket against Australia, although the match was not an official test match. The only player to play for New Zealand at rugby league and then an official test match in cricket for New Zealand was Verdun Scott who achieved the feat in 1939 and 1946 respectively.

Kiwi 221, Wilf Hassan became the New Zealand Diving champion in 1934 and 1935, and Kiwi captain Puti Tipene (Steve) Watene became a Member of Parliament after his retirement from rugby league.

Four Kiwis have gone on to be test referees; Albert House, Maurice Wetherill, Vic Belsham and Henry Perenara.

Country	Sport	No.	Players
New Zealand	rugby union	37	Albert Asher, Frano Botica, Alphonsus Carroll, Bert Cooke, Tom Cross, Marc Ellis, Dave Evans, Charles Fitzgerald, Arthur Francis, George A. Gillett, Jimmy Haig, Harold Hayward, John Hogan, Ned Hughes, Karl Ifwersen, William Johnston, Herb Lilburne, Dougie McGregor, Duncan McGregor, Bill Mackrell, Hawea Mataira, Billy Mitchell, George Nēpia, Jim O'Brien, Lou Petersen, Matthew Ridge, Kurt Sherlock, George Smith, Dave Solomon, George Spencer, John Spencer, John Timu, Roger Tuivasa-Sheck, Hubert Turtill, Eric Watkins, Sonny Bill Williams, Edgar Wrigley
Samoa	rugby league	34	Roy Asotasi, Monty Betham, Mark Elia, Henry Fa'afili, David Fa'alogo, Kalifa Faifai Loa, David Faiumu, Joe Galuvao, Harrison Hansen, Ali Lauitiiti, Francis Leota, Jeff Lima, Jamaal Lolesi, Francis Meli, Sam Panapa, Eddy Pettybourne, Robert Piva, Willie Poching, Frank Pritchard, Tony Puletua, Ben Roberts, Tea Ropati, Setaimata Sa, Junior Sa'u, Jerry Seuseu, David Solomona, Se'e Solomona, Anthony Swann, Willie Talau, Tony Tatupu, Tony Tuimavave, Matt Utai, Joe Vagana, Nigel Vagana, Antonio Winterstein
Tonga	rugby league	9	Awen Guttenbeil, Epalahame Lauaki, Tevita Leo-Latu, Andrew Lomu, Duane Mann, George Mann, Sika Manu, Fuifui Moimoi, Taniela TuiakiFrancis Leota
Australasia	rugby league	7	Albert Asher, Ernie Asher, Arthur Francis, George A. Gillett, Bert Laing, Charles Savory, Frank Woodward
Australia	rugby league	4	Tonie Carroll, Bill Kelly, Dally Messenger, Con Sullivan
England	rugby union	4	Fred Jackson, Henry Paul, Lesley Vainikolo, Shontayne Hape
Cook Islands	rugby league	3	Alex Glenn, Kevin Iro, Zeb Taia
New Zealand	cricket	2	Charles Finlayson, Verdun Scott
France	rugby league	1	Mark Bourneville
New Zealand	water polo	1	Brent Todd
New Zealand	long jump	1	Bevin Hough
Tonga	rugby union	1	Emosi Koloto
Australia	rugby union	1	Dally Messenger

== Gallery ==
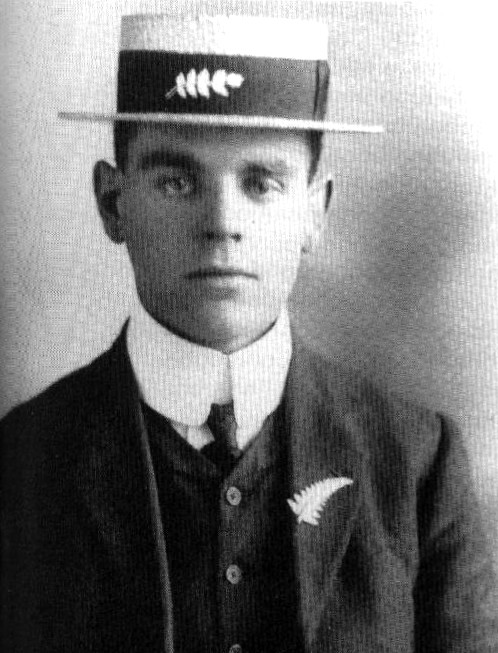
1 Albert Baskerville

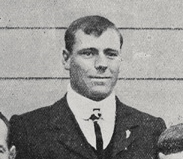
4 Tom Cross

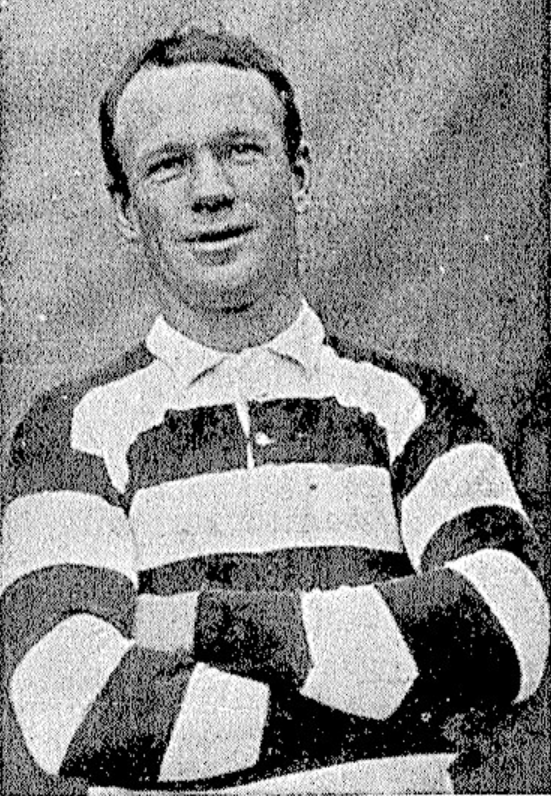
5 Charles Dunning

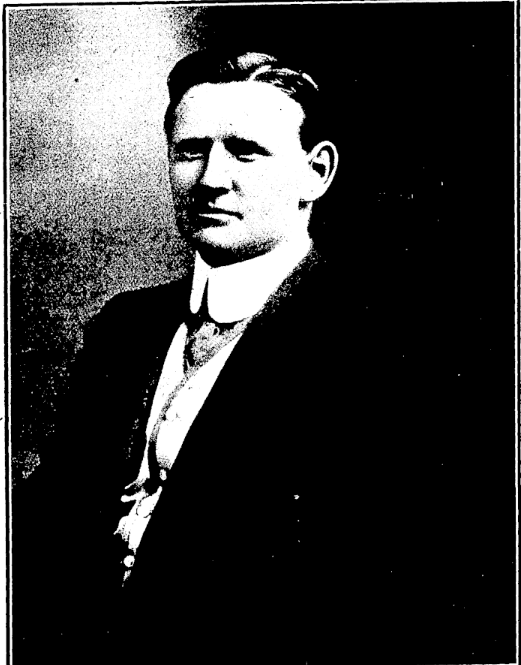
8 Jim Gleeson

13 Duncan McGregor

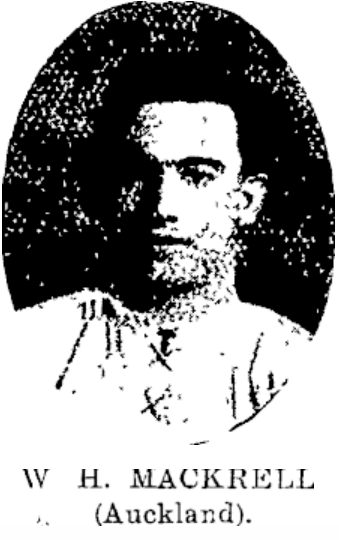
14 Bill Mackrell

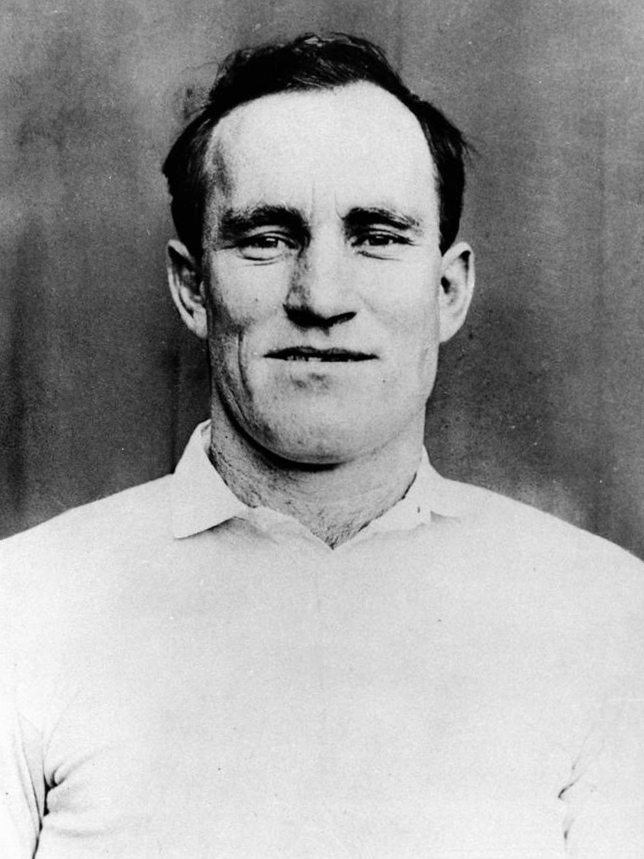
15 Dally Messenger

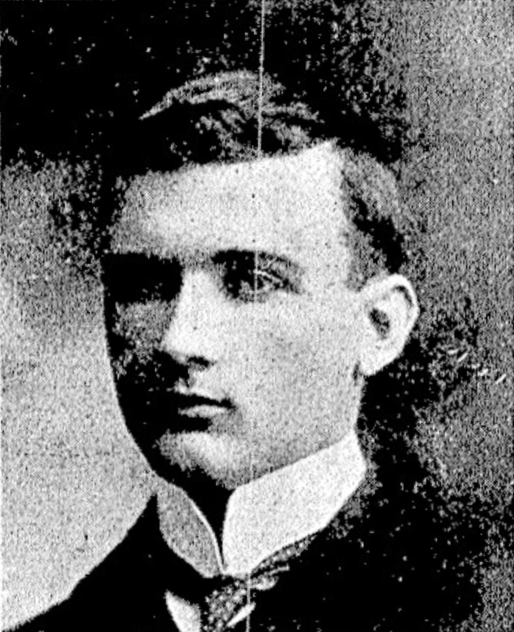
17 Harold Rowe

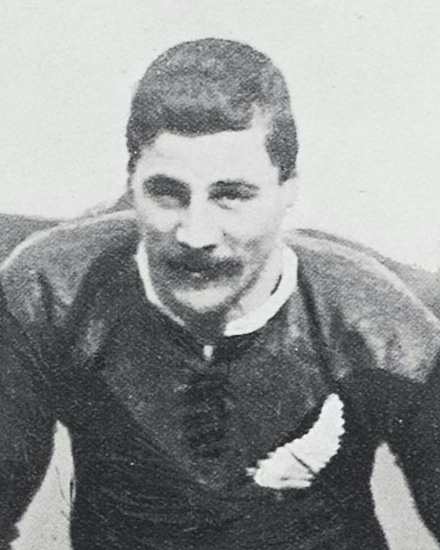
18 George W Smith

19 Lance Todd

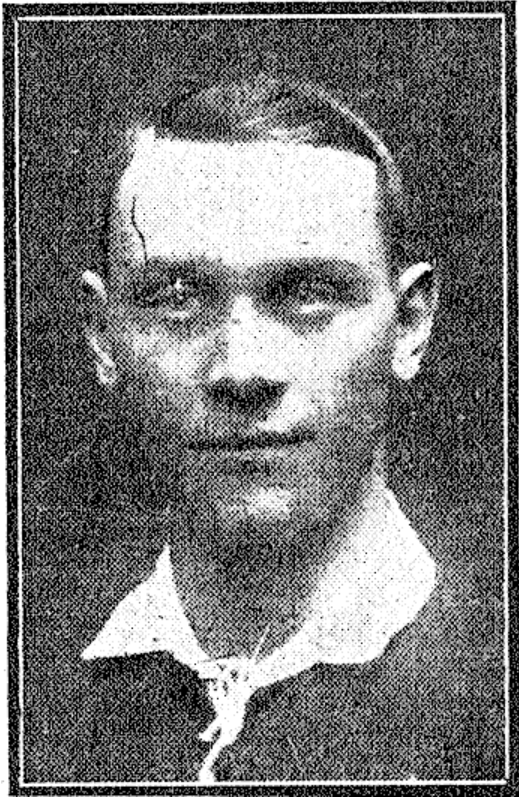
21 Hubert Turtill

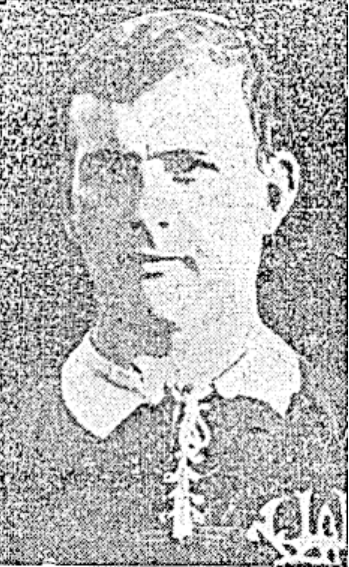
24 Eric Watkins

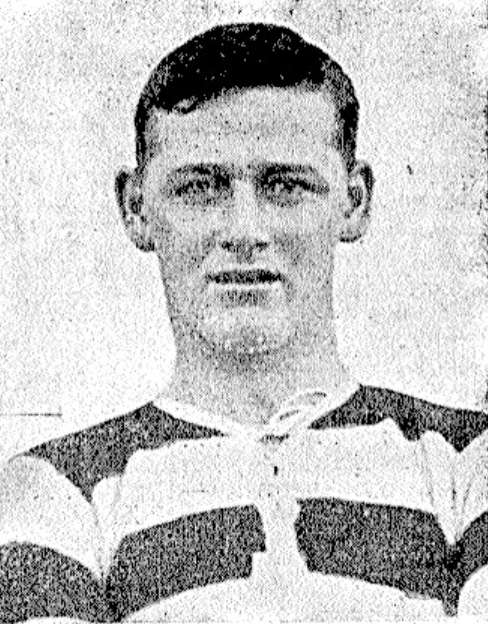
27 Richard Wynyard

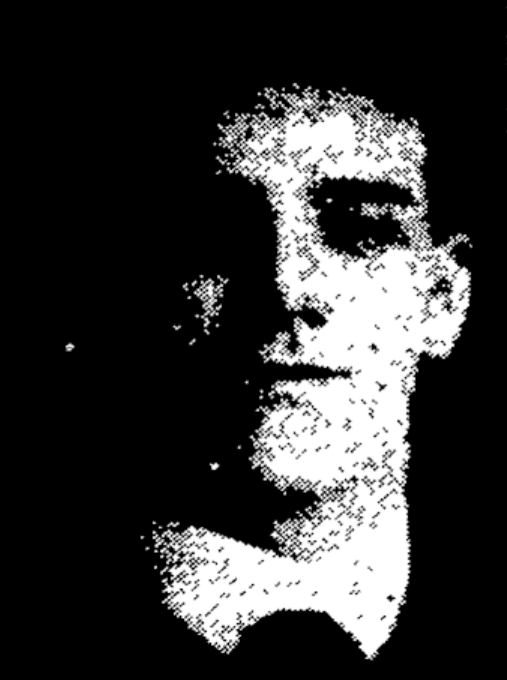
28 Billy Wynyard

41 Con Sullivan

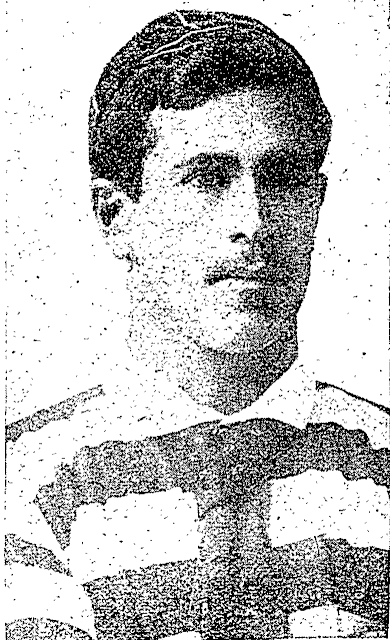
43 Albert Asher

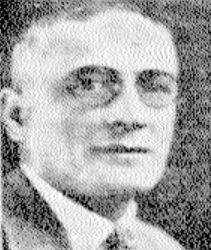
44 Ernie Asher

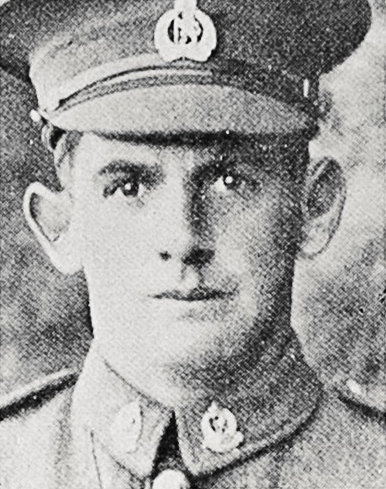
45 Charles James

46 Frank Woodward

51 George Seagar

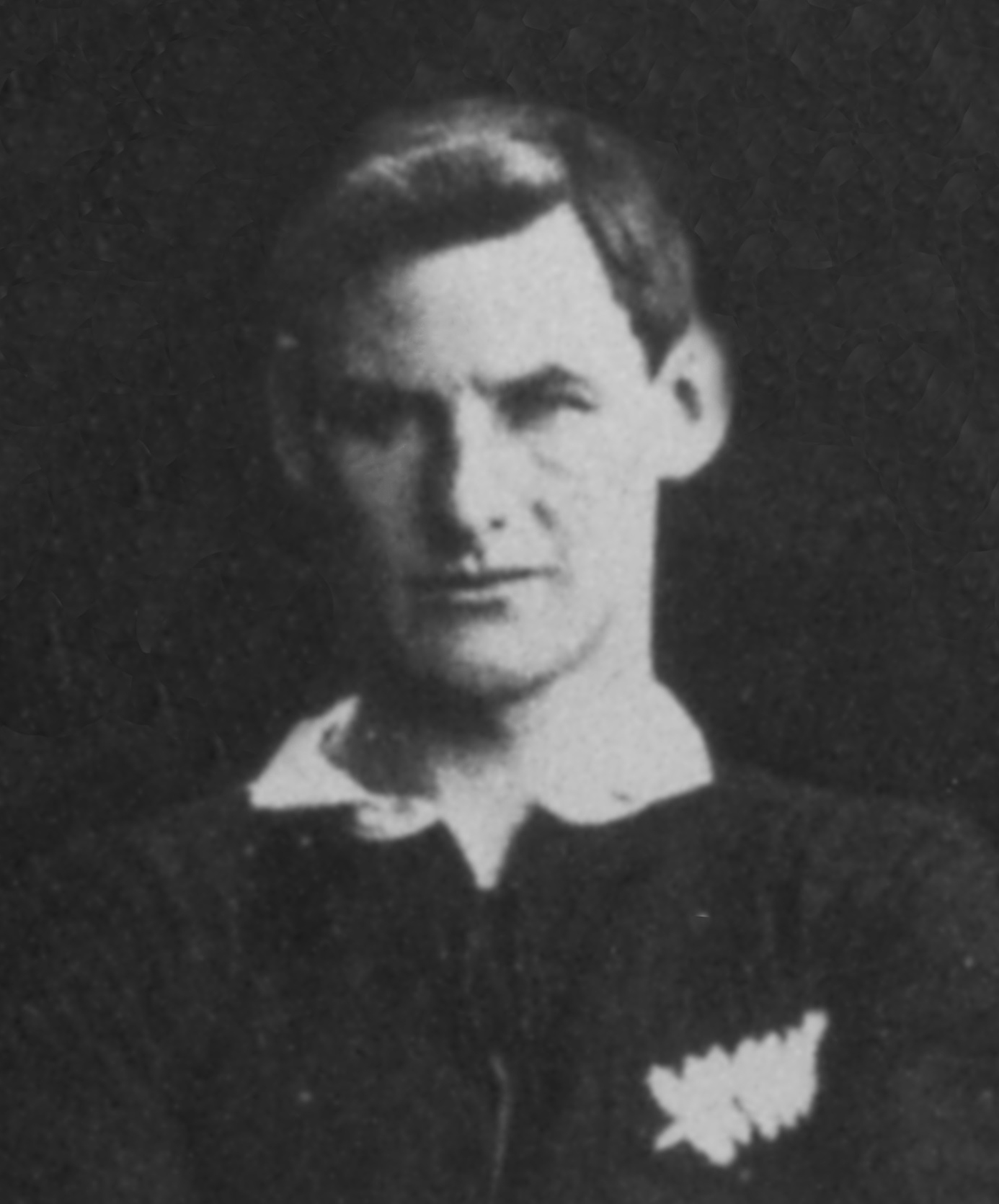
54 Arthur Francis

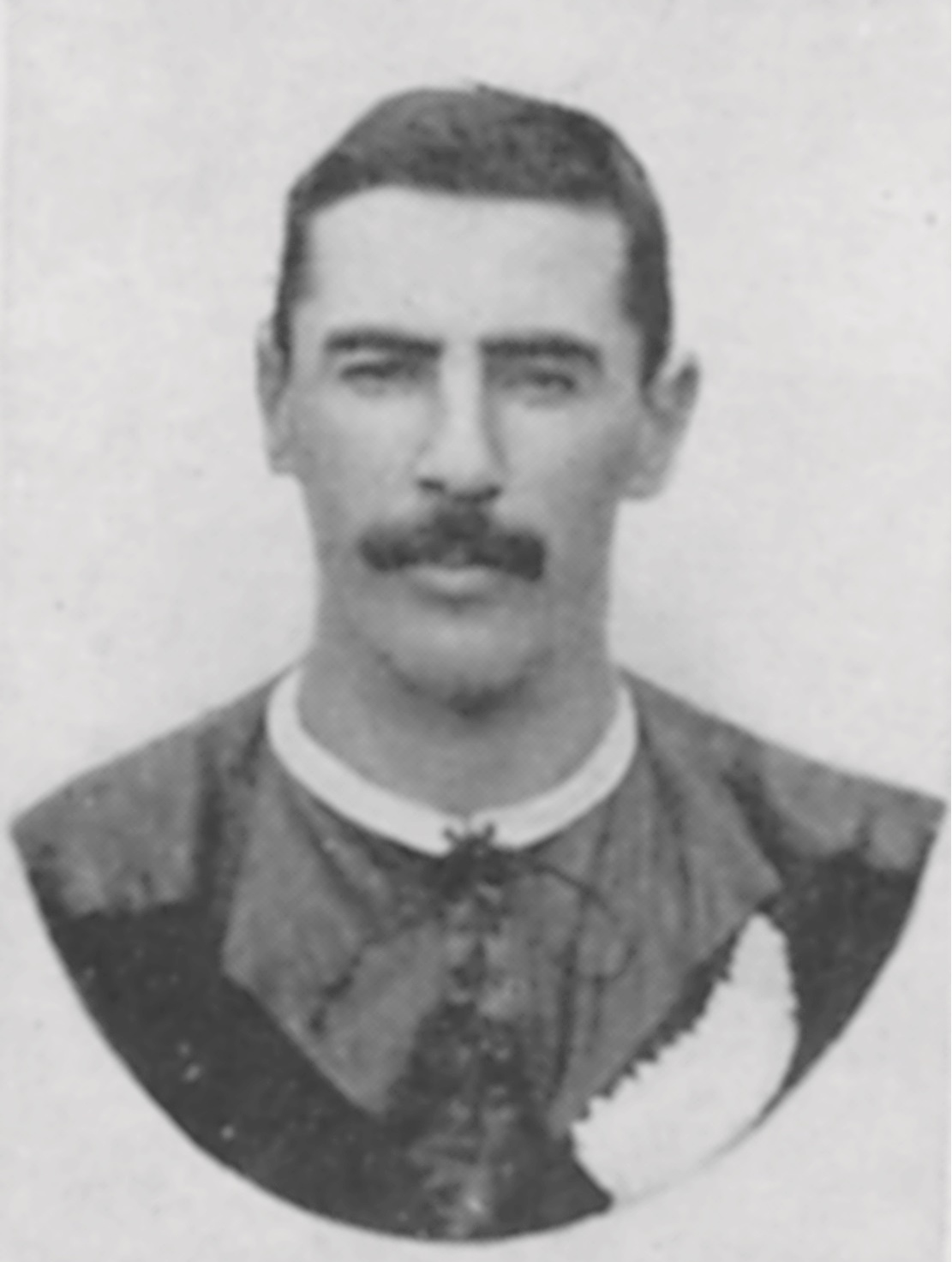
55 George Gillett

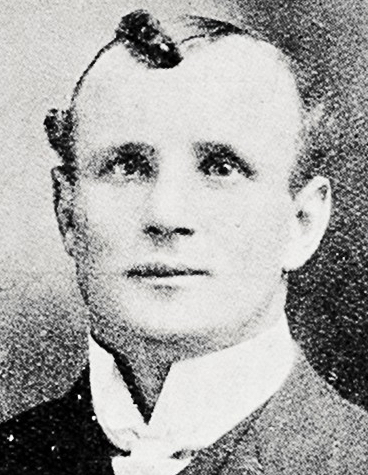
61 Charles Savory

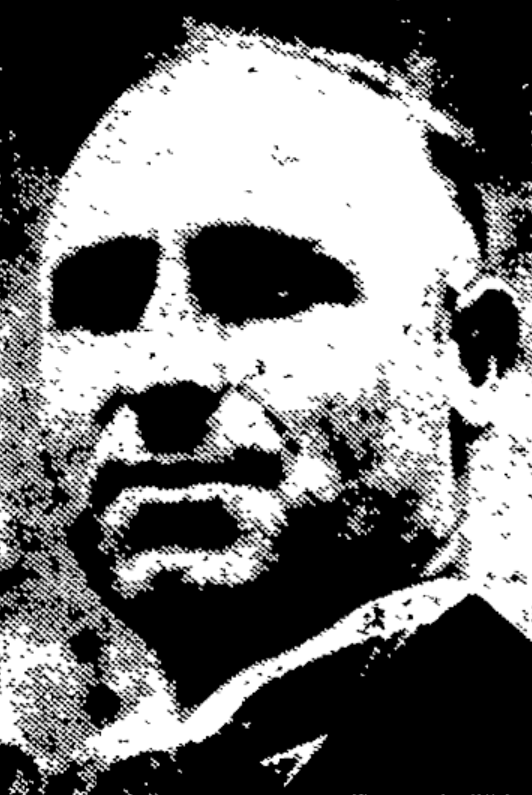
68 Billy Mitchell

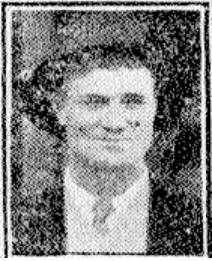
74 Arthur Hardgrave

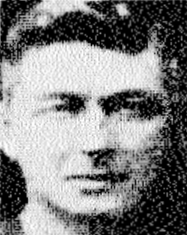
75 Harold Hayward

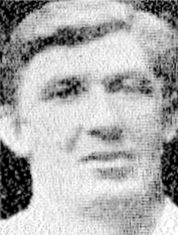
76 Morgan Hayward

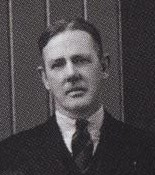
78 Bill Kelly

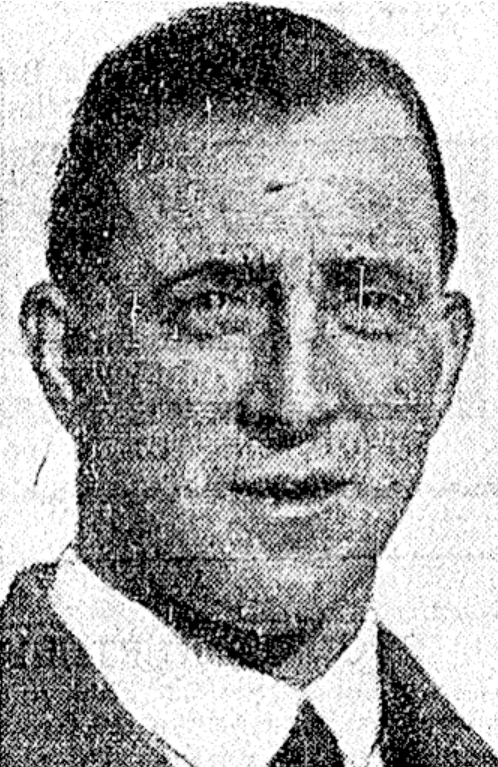
92 Karl Ifwersen

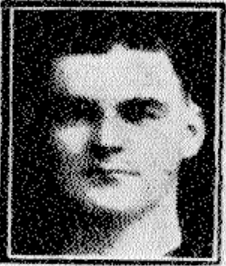
111 Bill Davidson

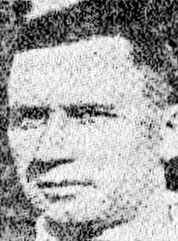
112 Ernie Herring

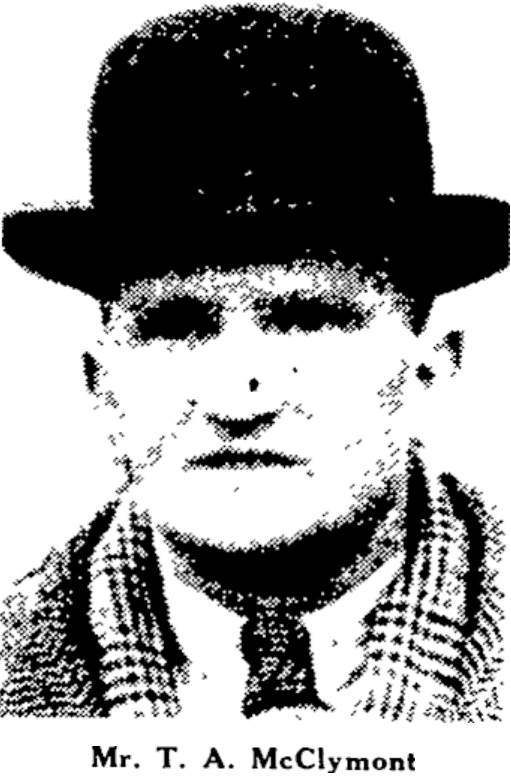
115 Thomas McClymont

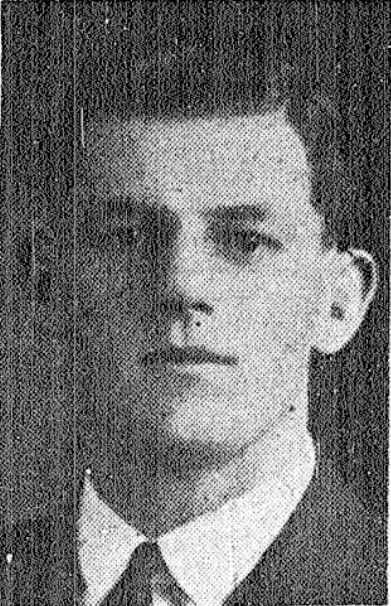
123 Bill Williams

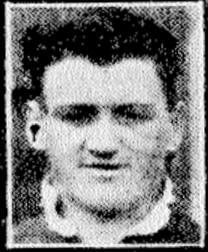
124 Craddock Dufty

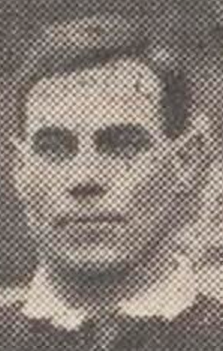
113 Bert Laing

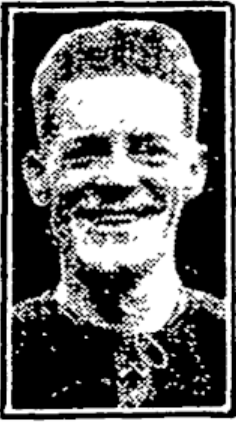
137 Nelson Bass

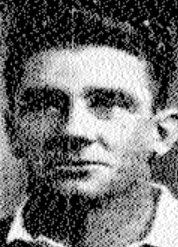
147 Frank Delgrosso

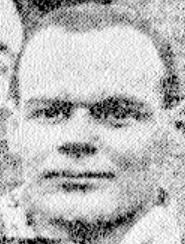
153 Hec Brisbane

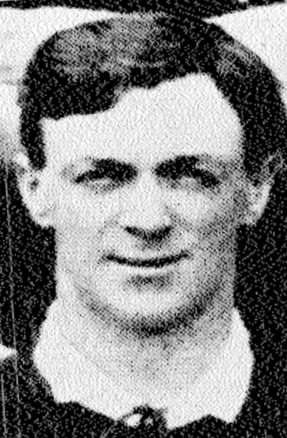
156 Maurice Wetherill

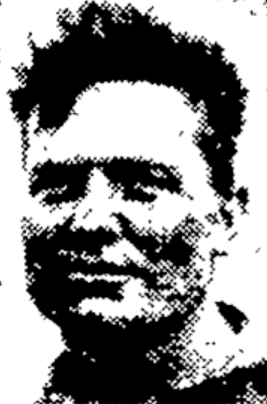
157 Andrew O'Brien

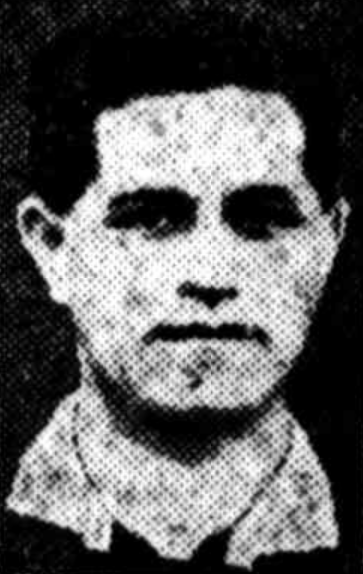
159 Bill Te Whata

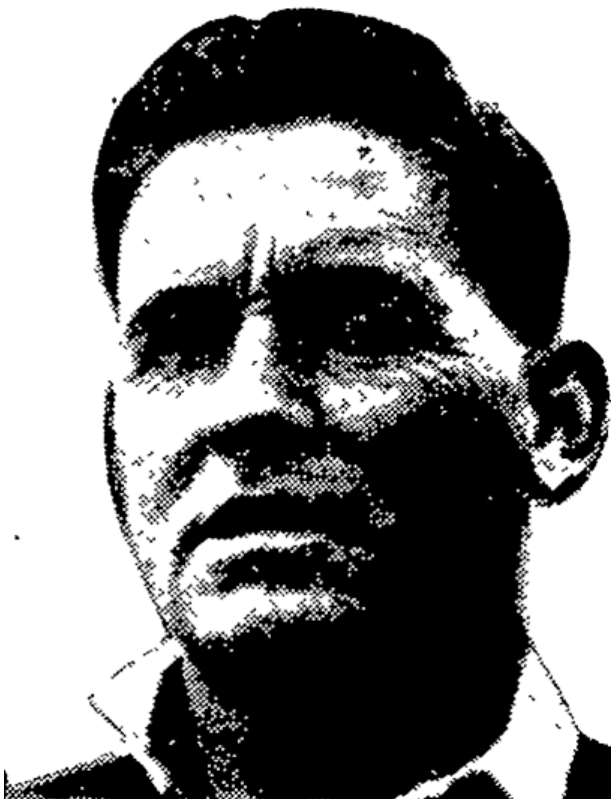
161 Bill Devine

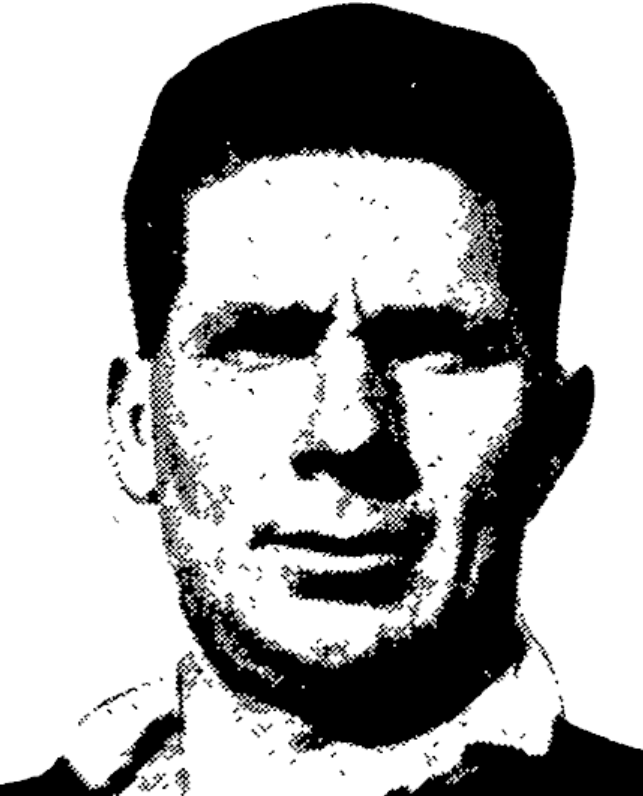
162 Lou Petersen

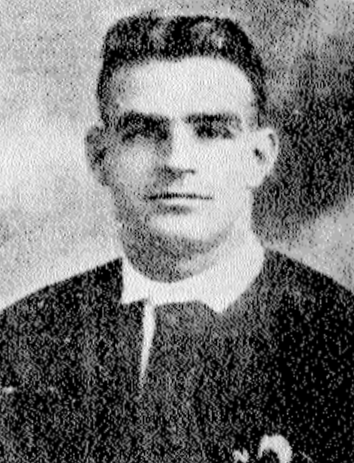
166 Lou Brown

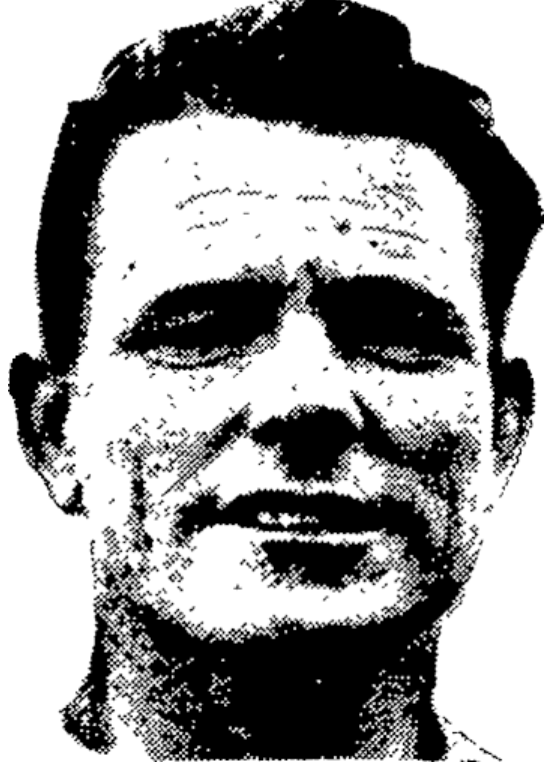
167 Alphonsus Carroll

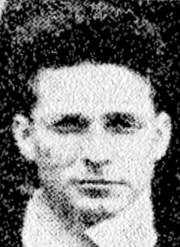
171 Charles Gregory

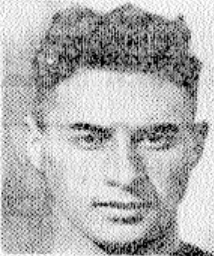
172 Wilson Hall

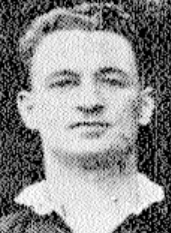
174 Jack Kirwan

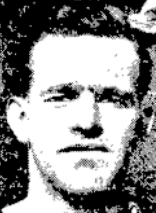
176 Harry Thomas

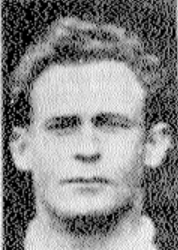
177 Stan Webb

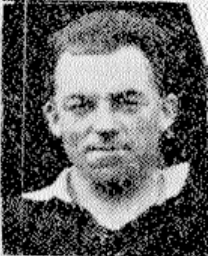
178 Neville St George

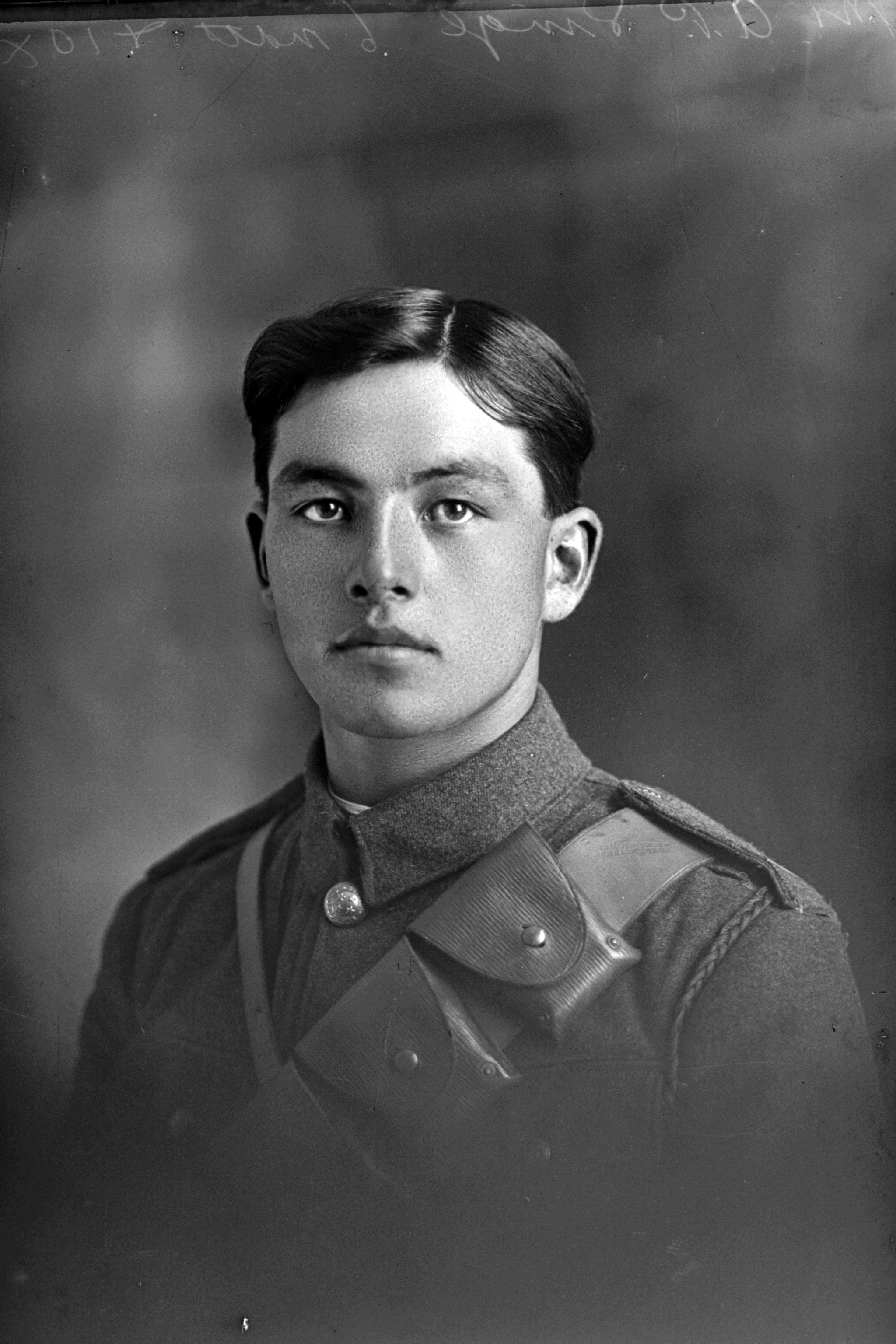
179 Arthur Singe

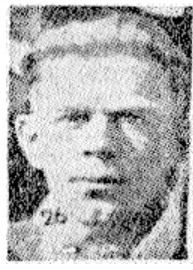
180 Ben Davidson

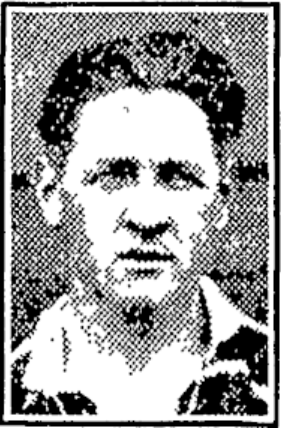
181 Ivan Littlewood

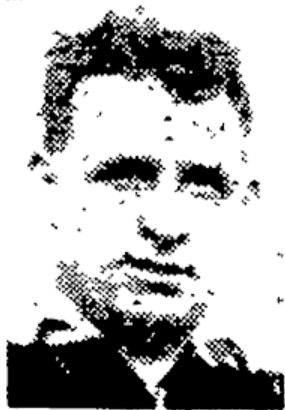
182 Jim O'Brien

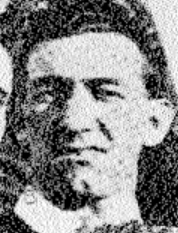
183 Hector Cole

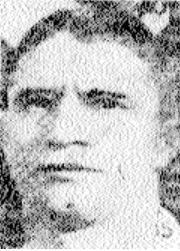
184 Wally Desmond

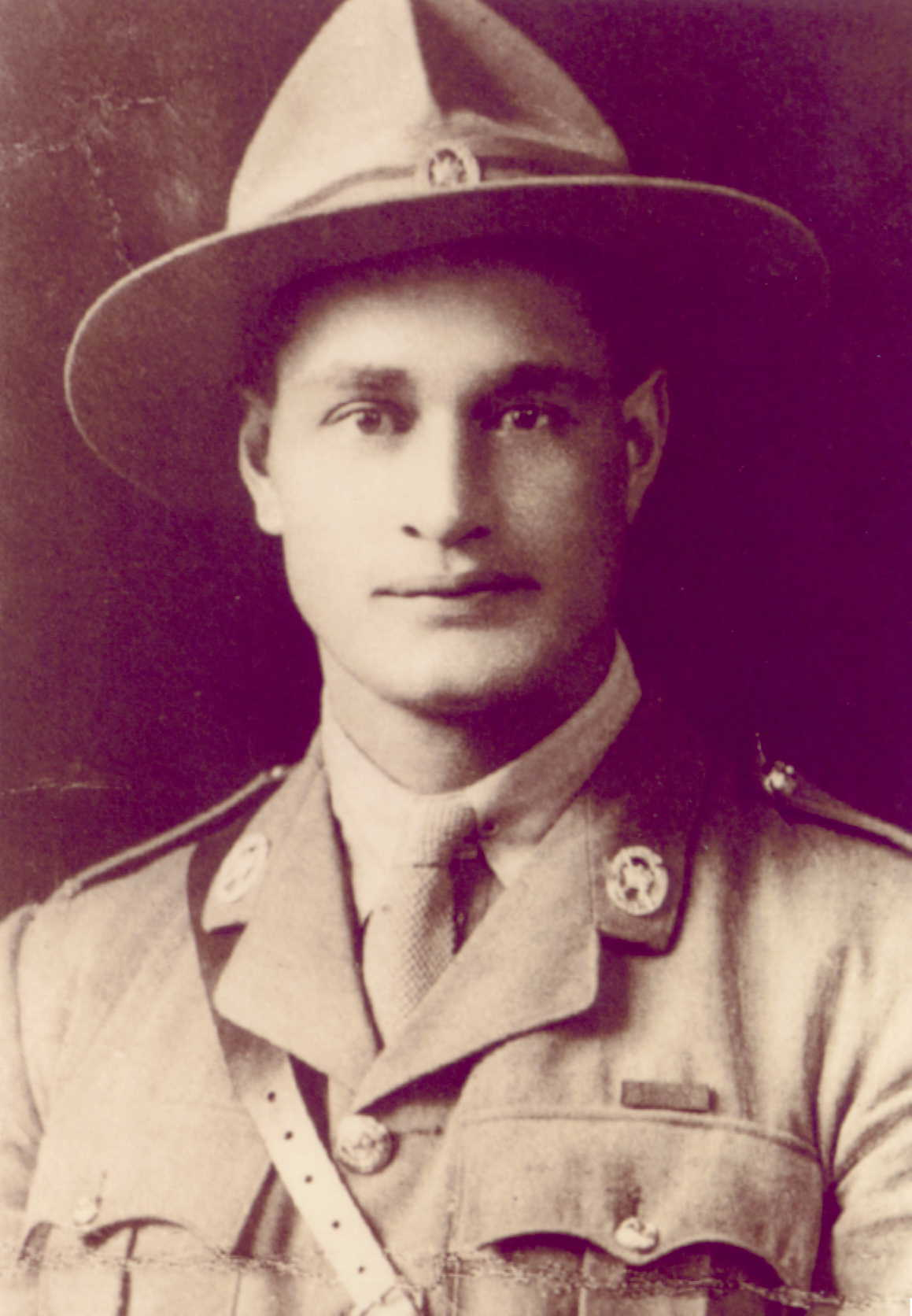
185 George Gardiner

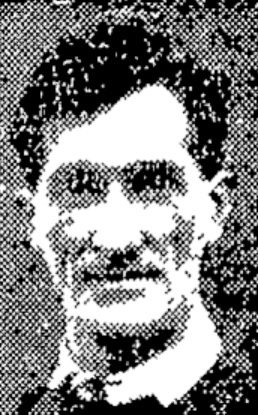
187 Joe Menzies

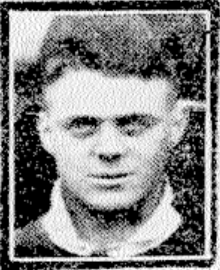
189 Roy Hardgrave

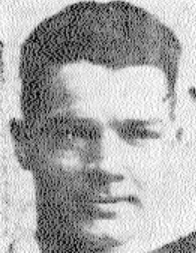
190 Claude List

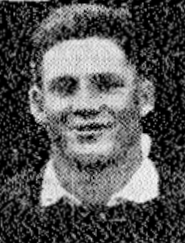
191 Len Scott

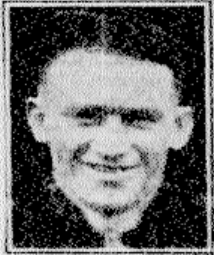
192 Stan Prentice

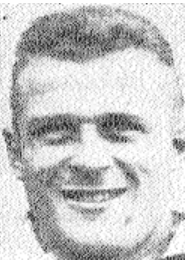
193 Lou Hutt

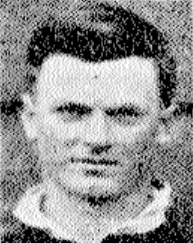
197 Trevor Hall

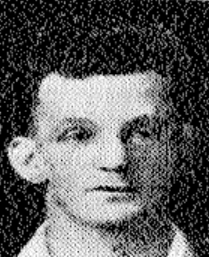
198 Tim Peckham

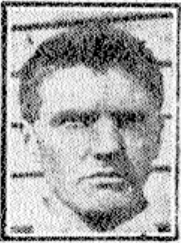
199 Alf Townsend

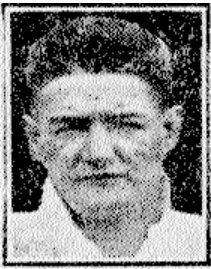
200 Bert Eckhoff

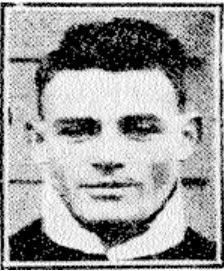
201 Edwin Abbott

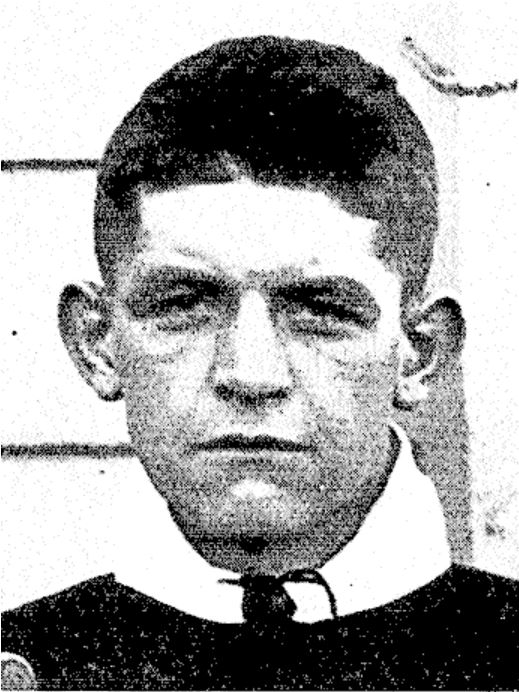
202 Jim Amos

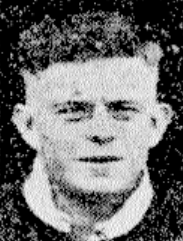
203 Len Barchard

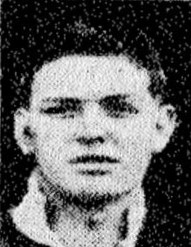
205 Stan Clark

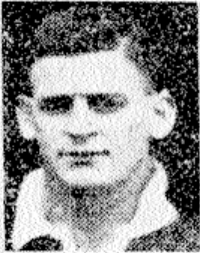
212 Allan Seagar

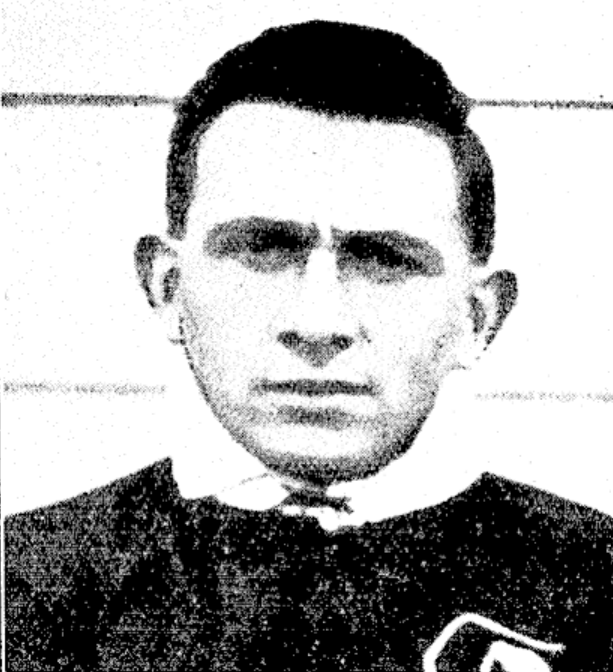
214 George Tittleton

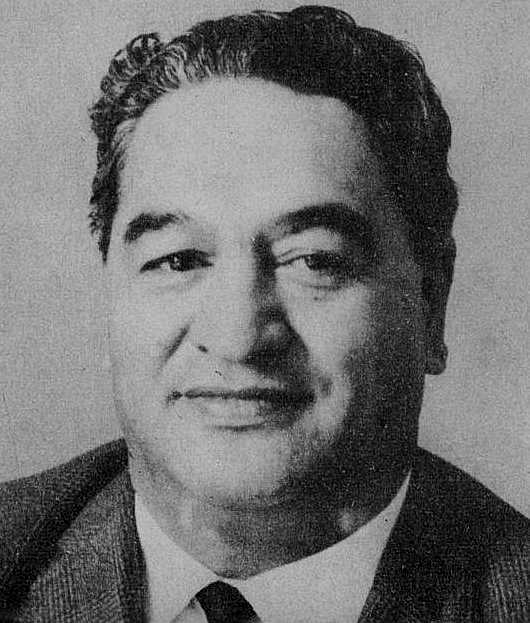
216 Puti Tipene Watene

218 Dick Smith

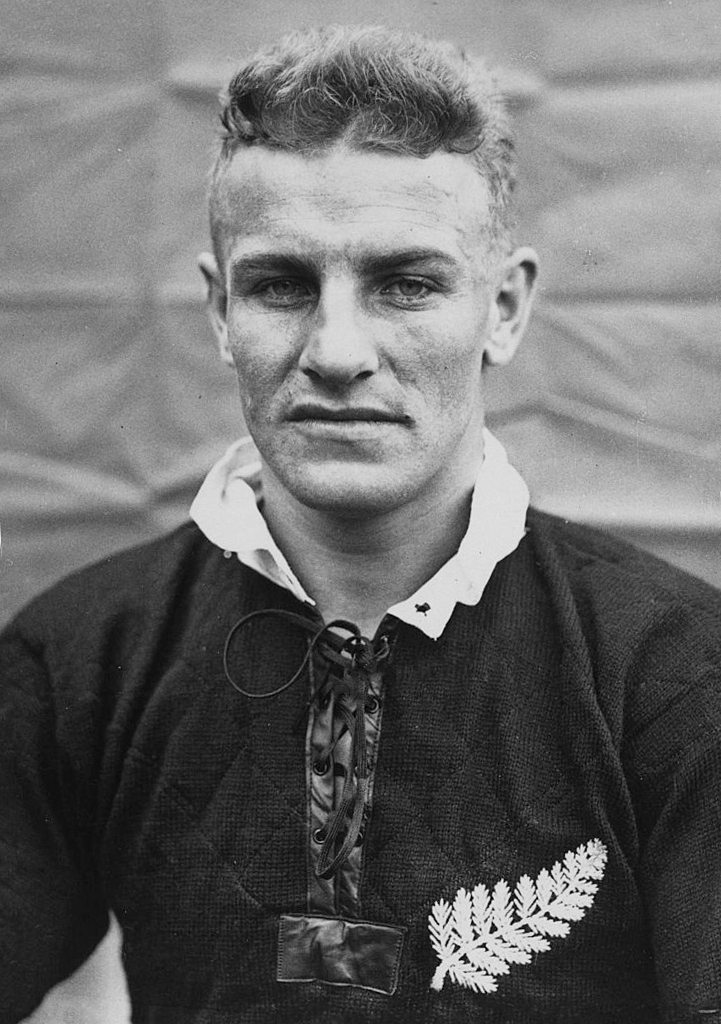
219 Bert Cooke

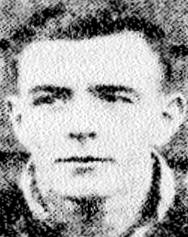
221 Wilf Hassan

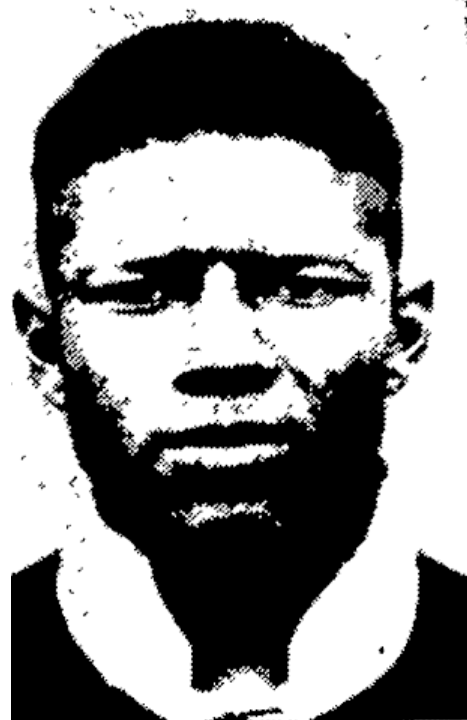
225 Ted Brimble

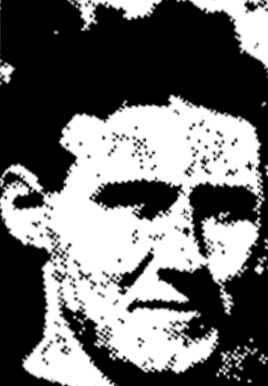
227 Alan Clarke

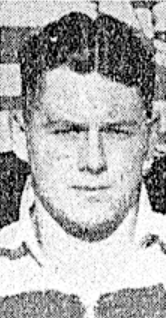
228 Arthur Kay

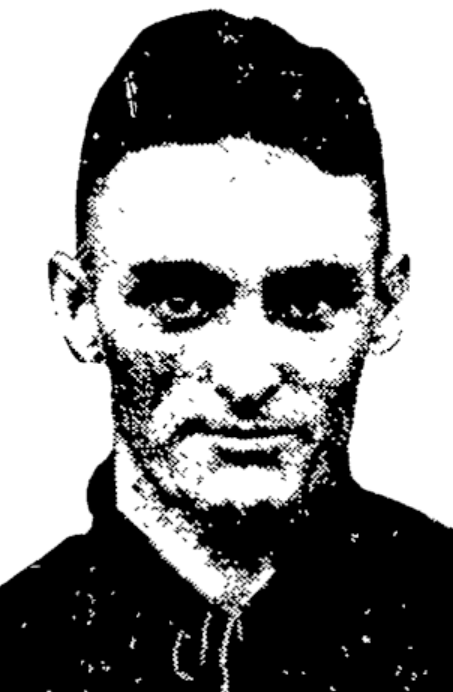
229 Ted Mincham

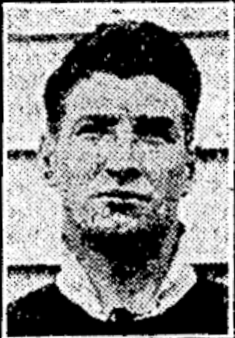
232 Cliff Satherley

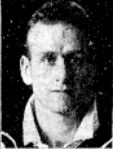
233 Harold Tetley

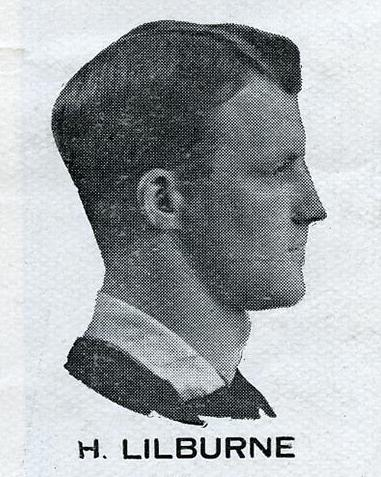
235 Herb Lilburne

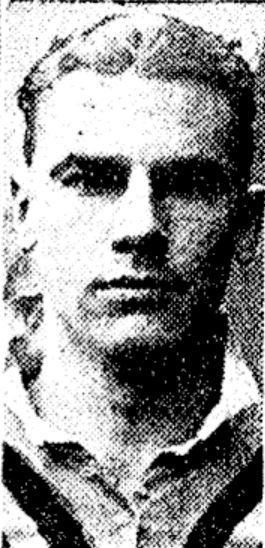
237 Brian Riley

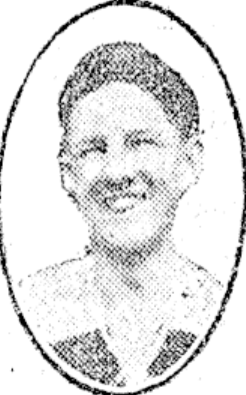
239 Eric Fletcher

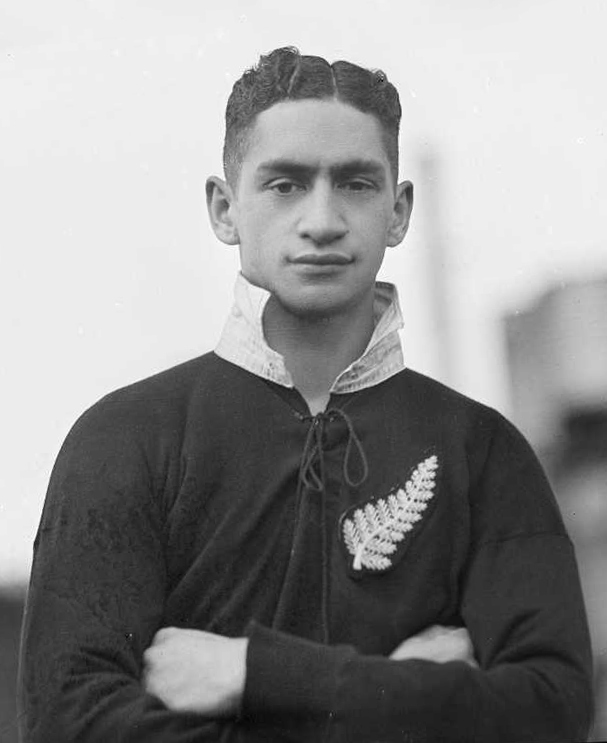
240 Jack Hemi

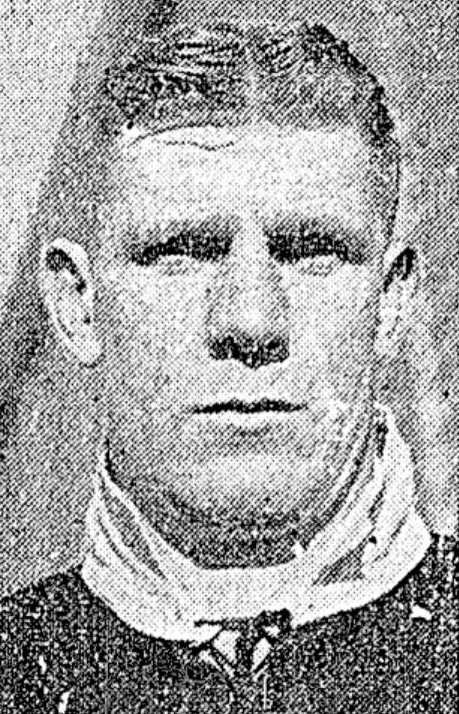
241 Wally Tittleton

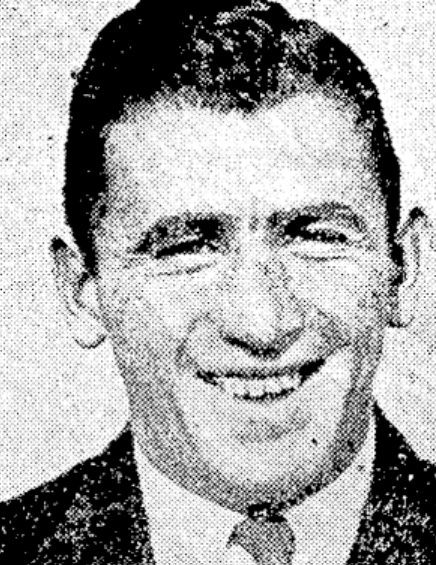
242 Thomas Trevarthan

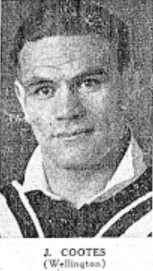
243 Joe Cootes

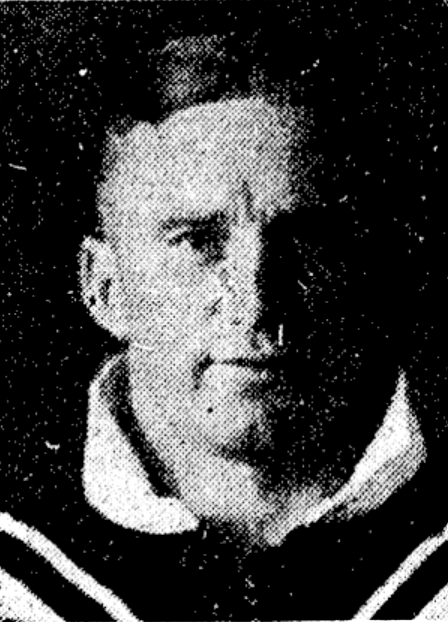
244 Bill McNeight

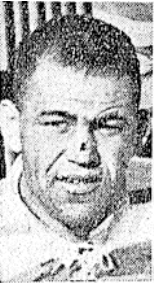
245 Frank Pickrang

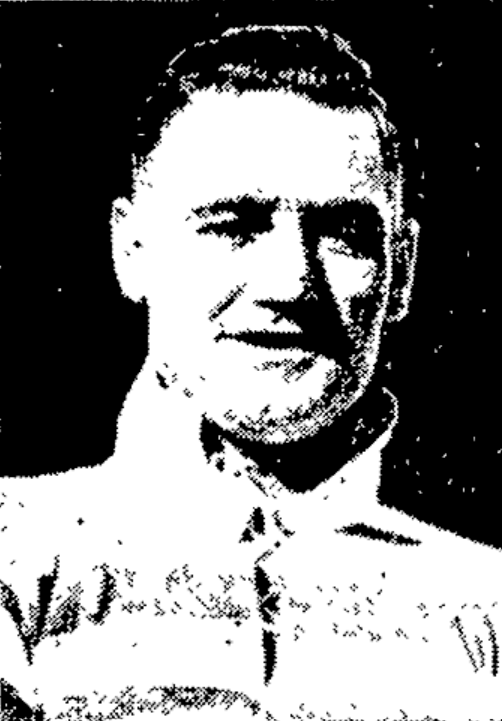
246 Claude Dempsey

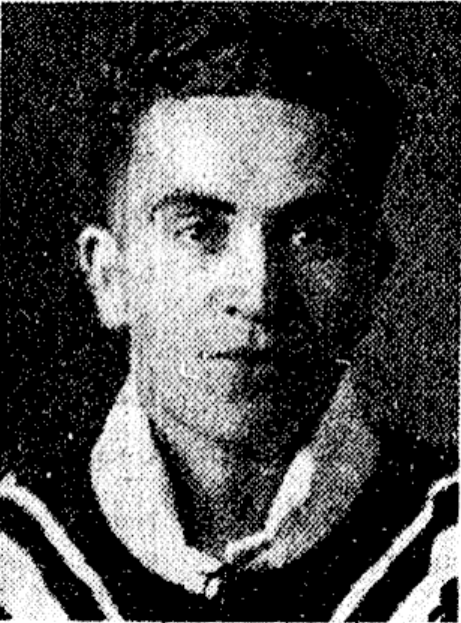
248 Rangi Chase

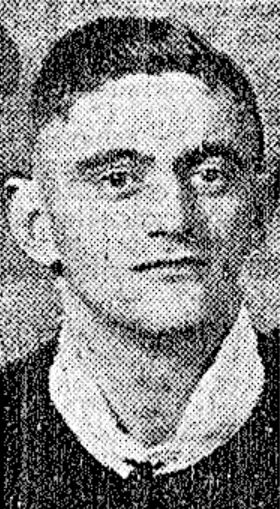
249 Noel Bickerton

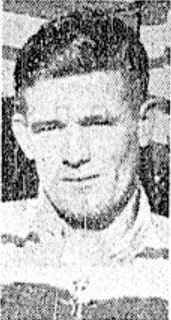
250 Frank Halloran

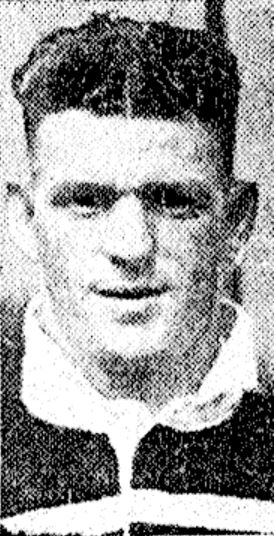
251 Angus Gault

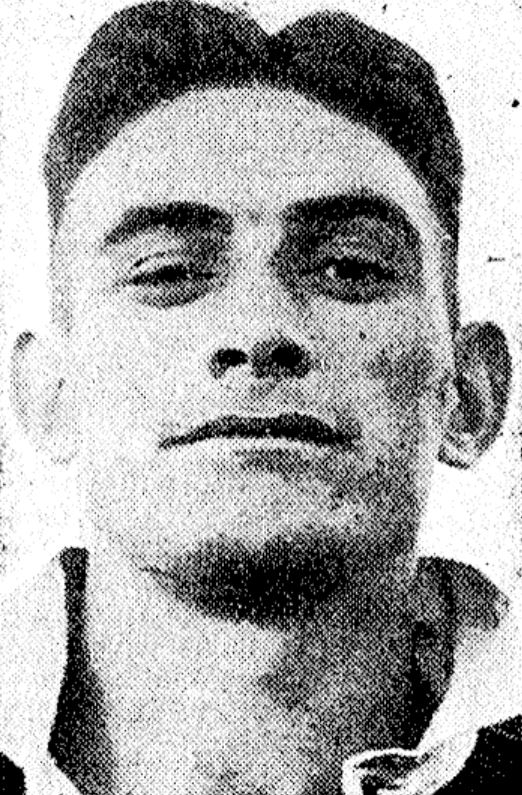
252 Jack Brodrick

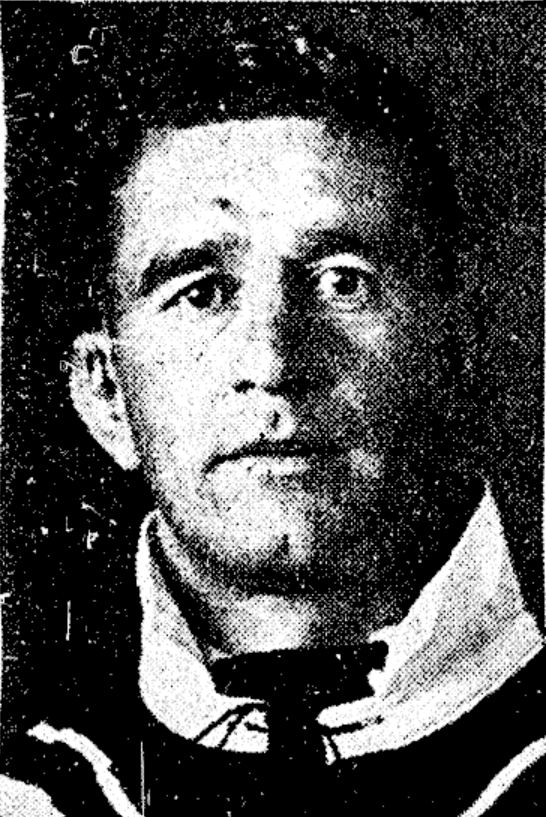
253 Jack McLeod

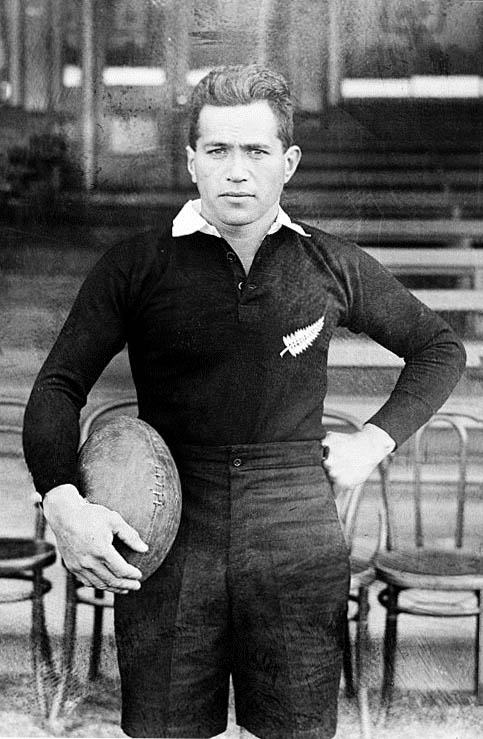
254 George Nēpia

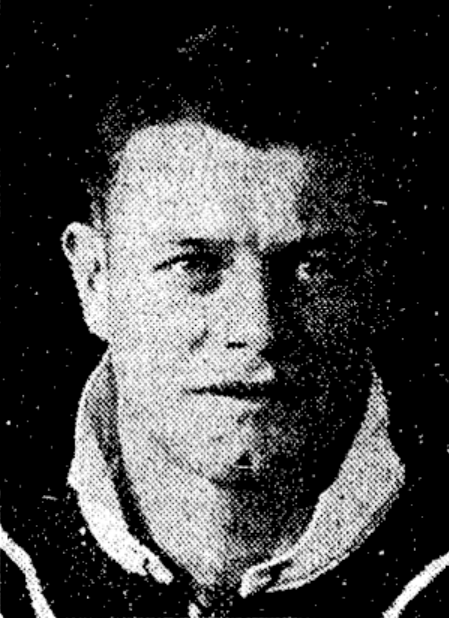
255 Jack Satherley

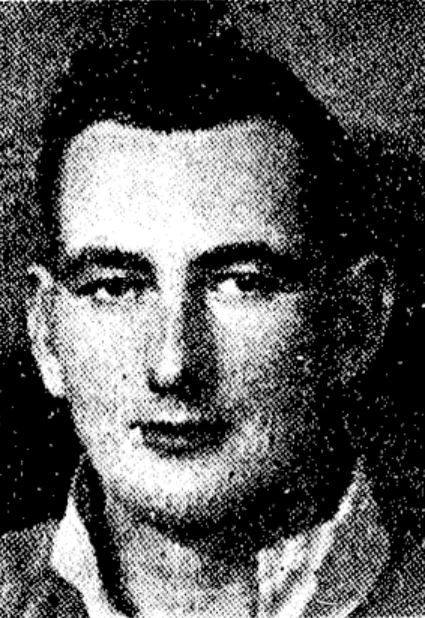
256 John Anderson

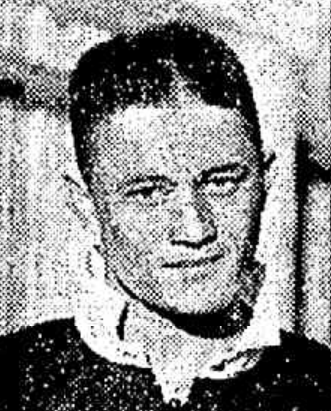
257 Walter Brimble

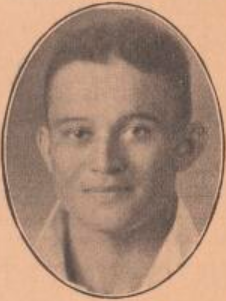
258 Wilfred Brimble

260 Robert Grotte

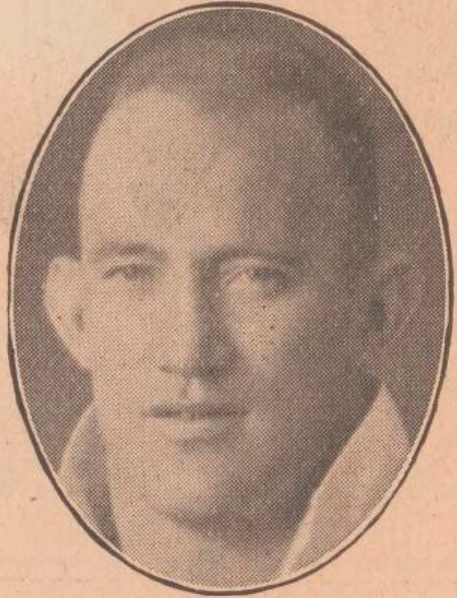
261 Des Herring

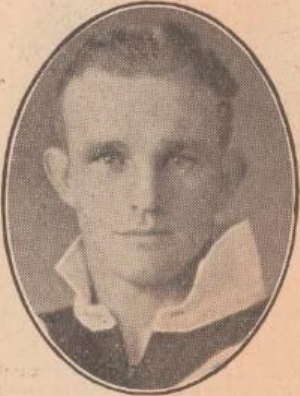
262 Clarry McNeil

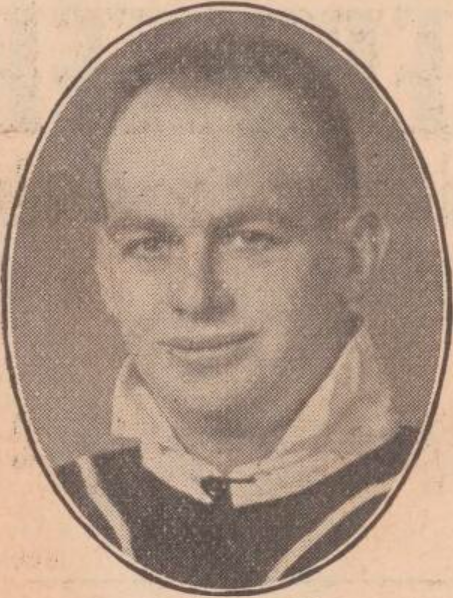
263 Gordon Midgley

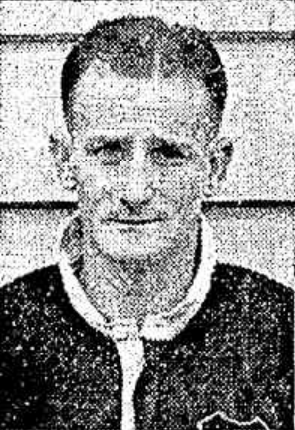
265 Jack Smith

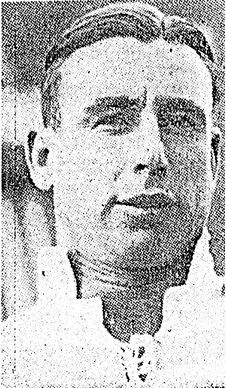
266 Bob Banham

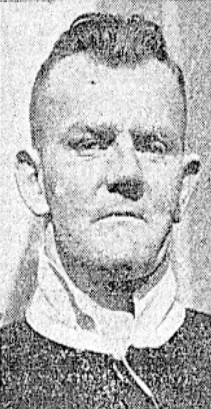
267 George Beadle

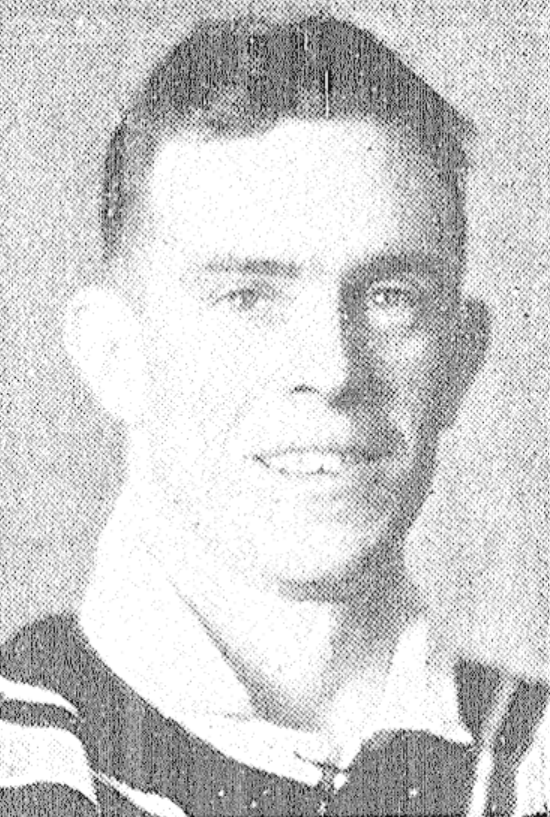
270 Jack Campbell

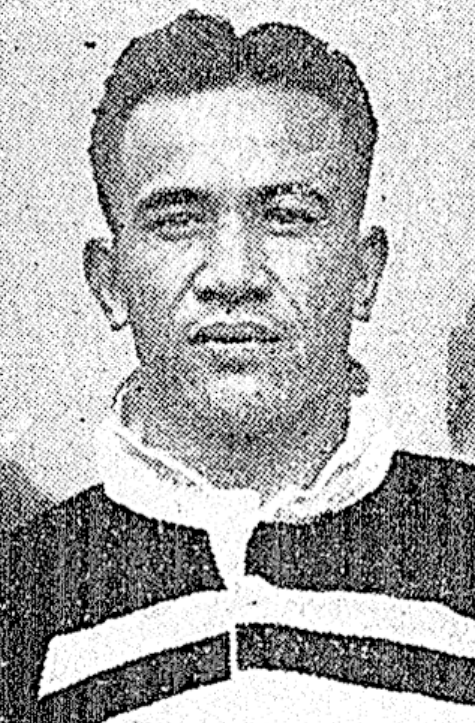
271 Tommy Chase

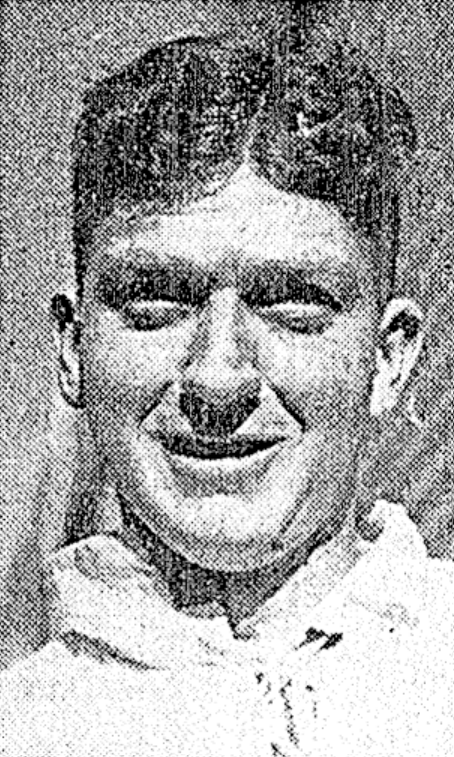
273 Ross Jones

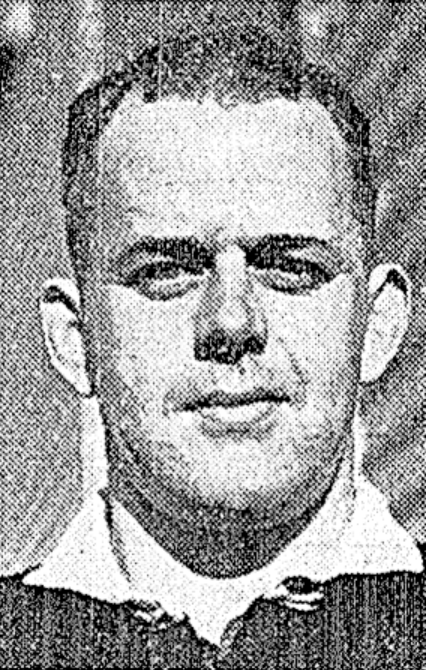
275 Bert Leatherbarrow

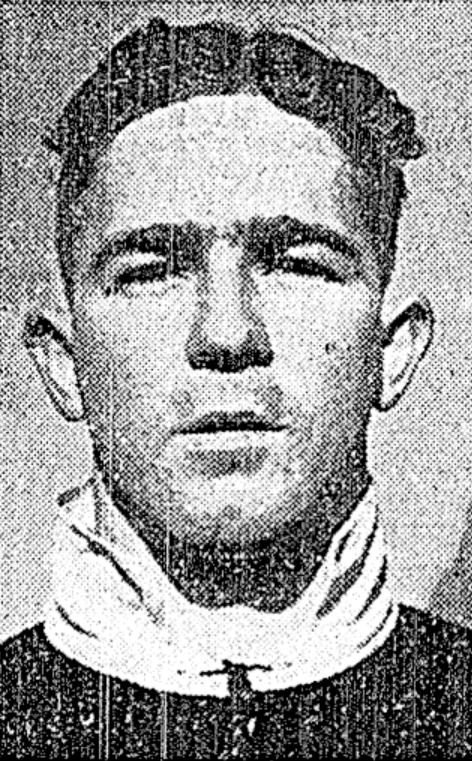
276 Arthur McInnarney

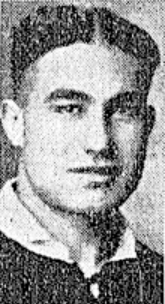
277 Hawea Mataira

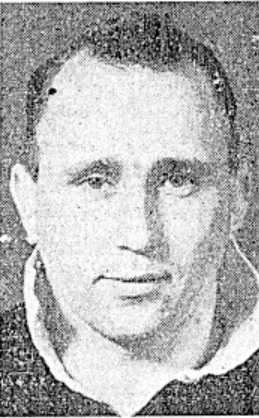
278 Harold Milliken

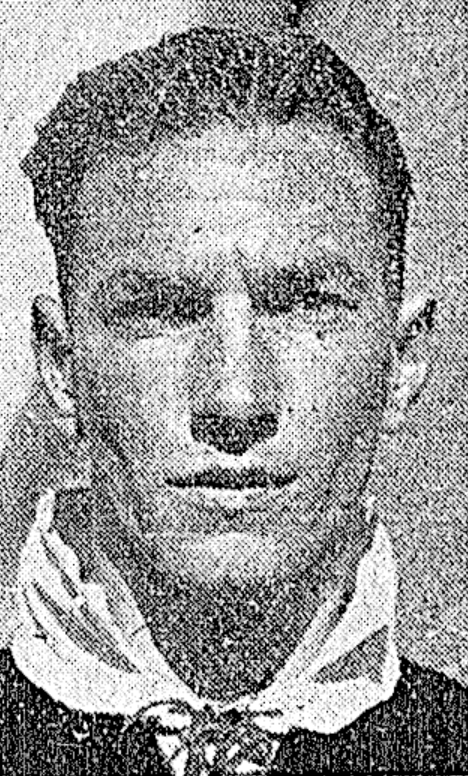
279 Laurie Mills

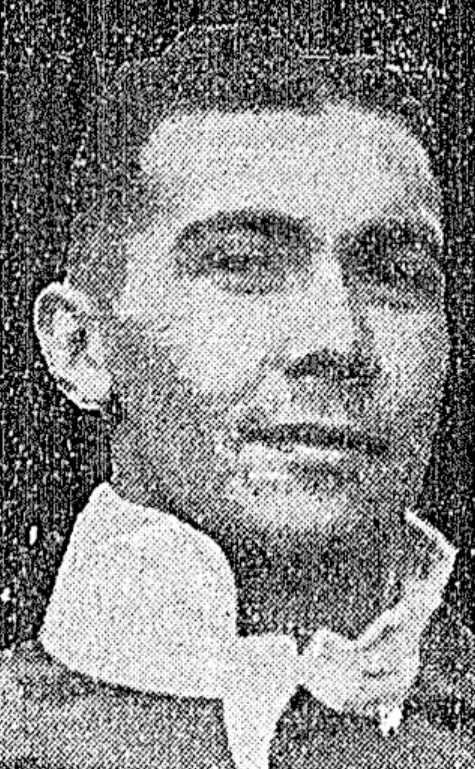
280 George Mitchell

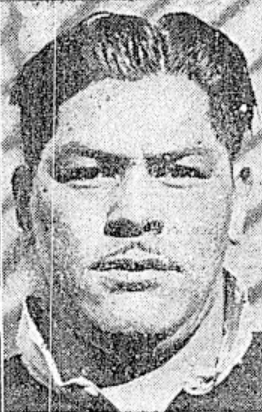
281 Pita Ririnui

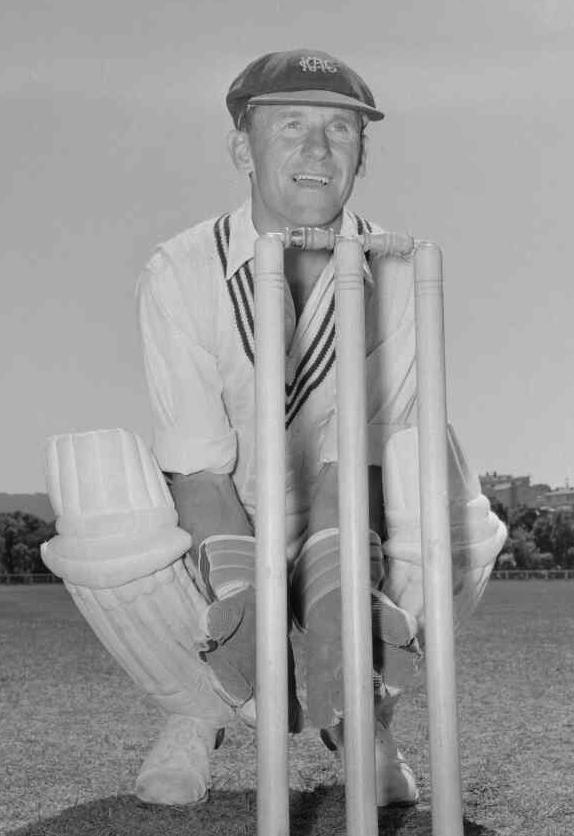
282 Verdun Scott

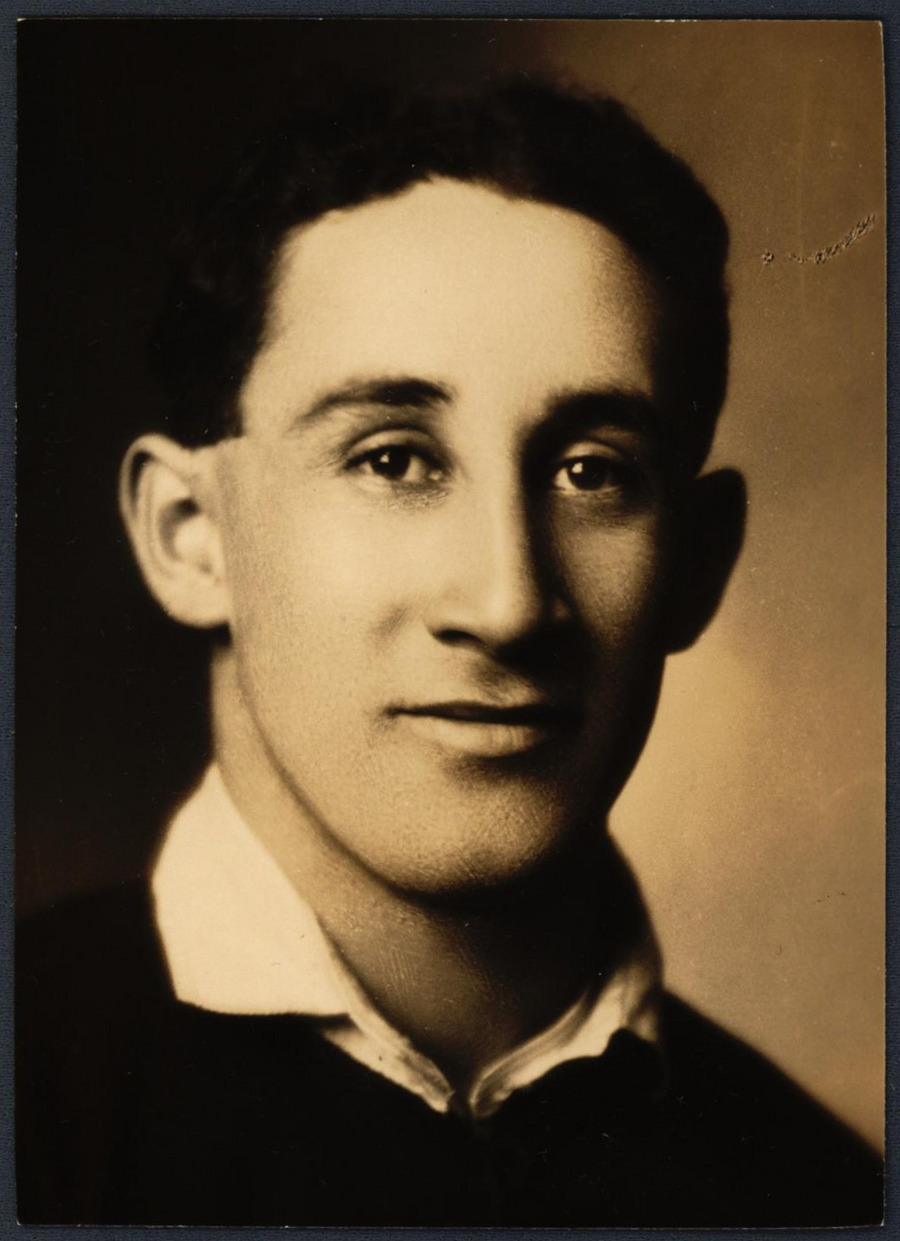
283 Dave Solomon

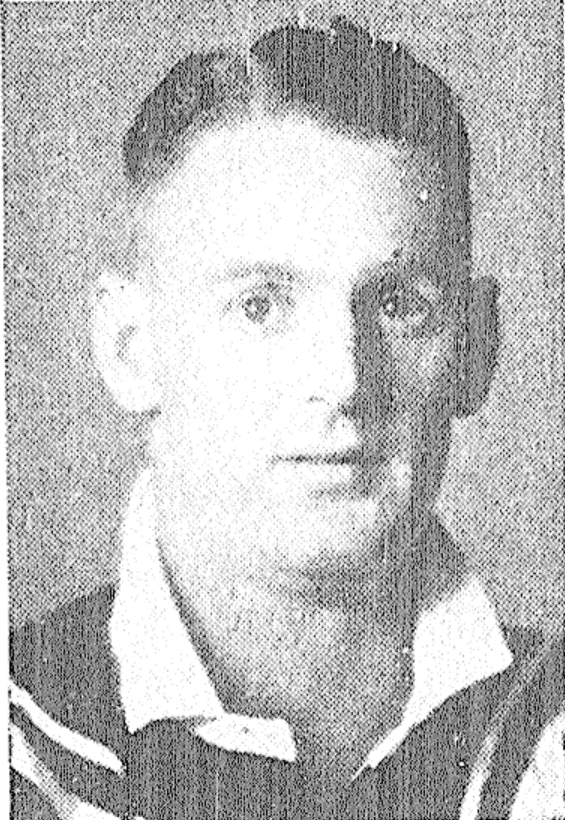
284 Ivor Stirling

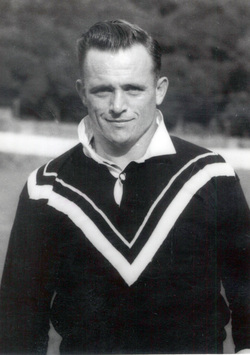
320 Tommy Baxter

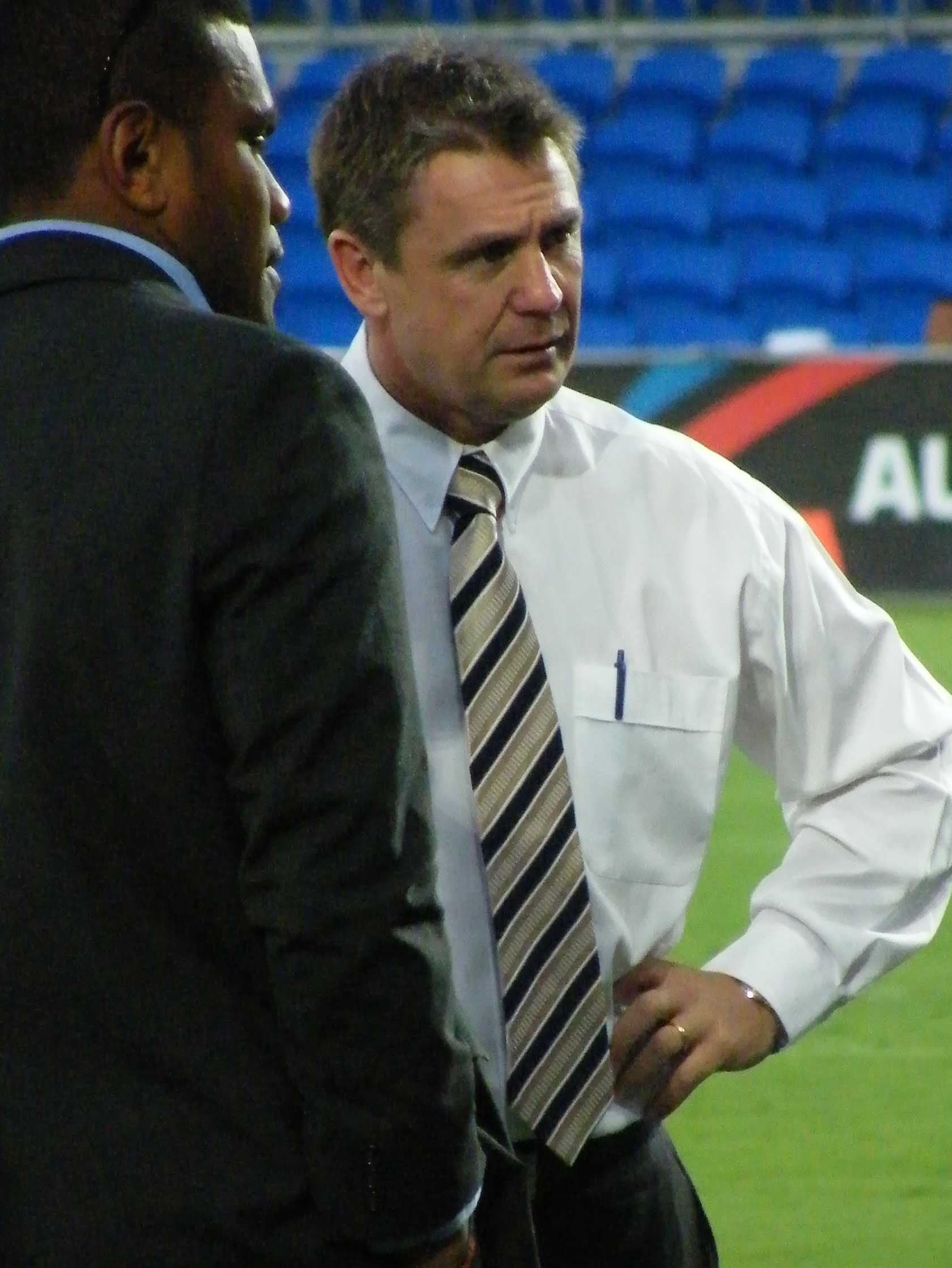
599 Gary Freeman

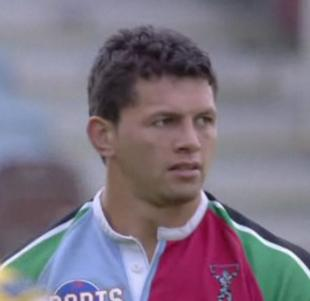
654 Henry Paul

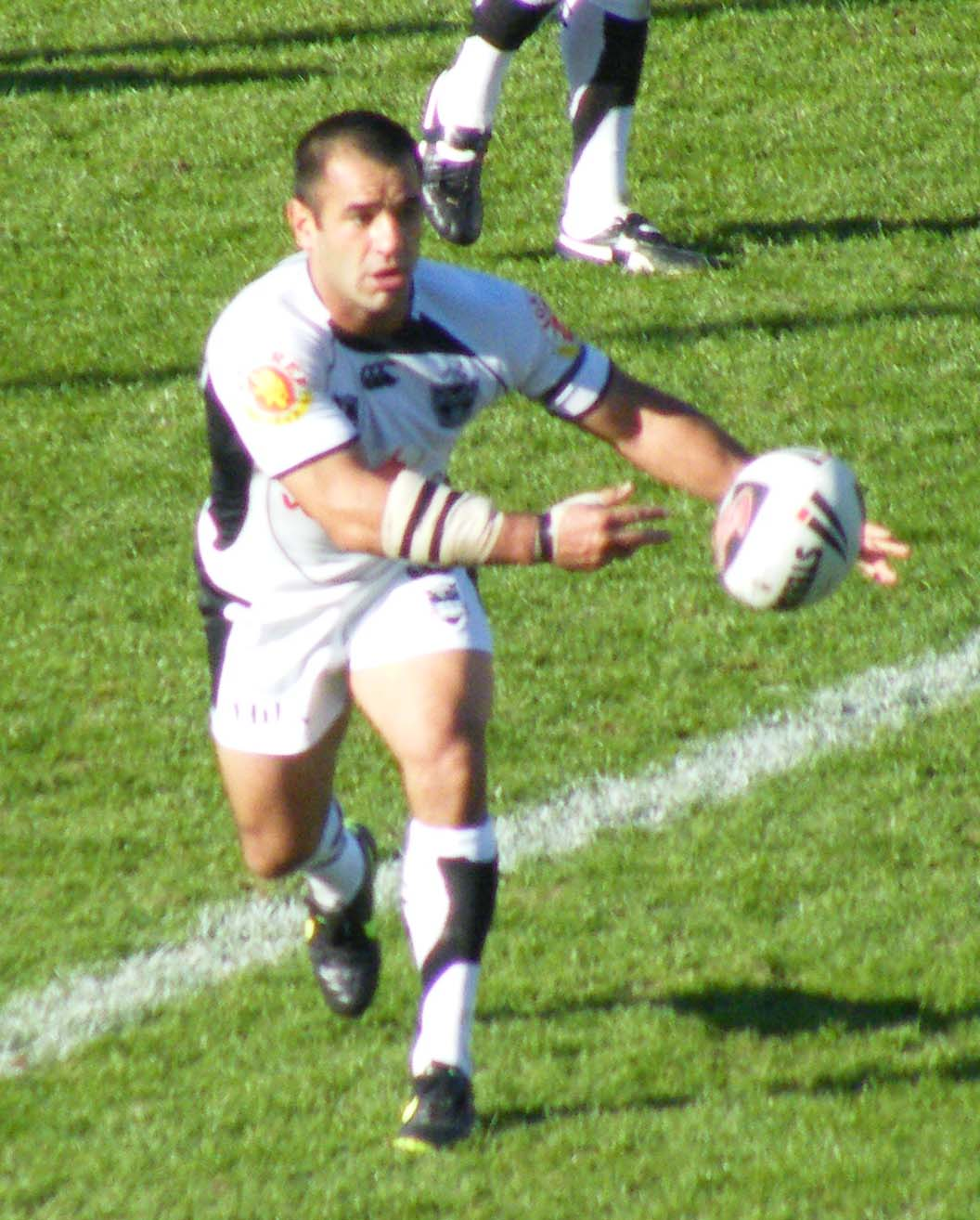
665 Stacey Jones

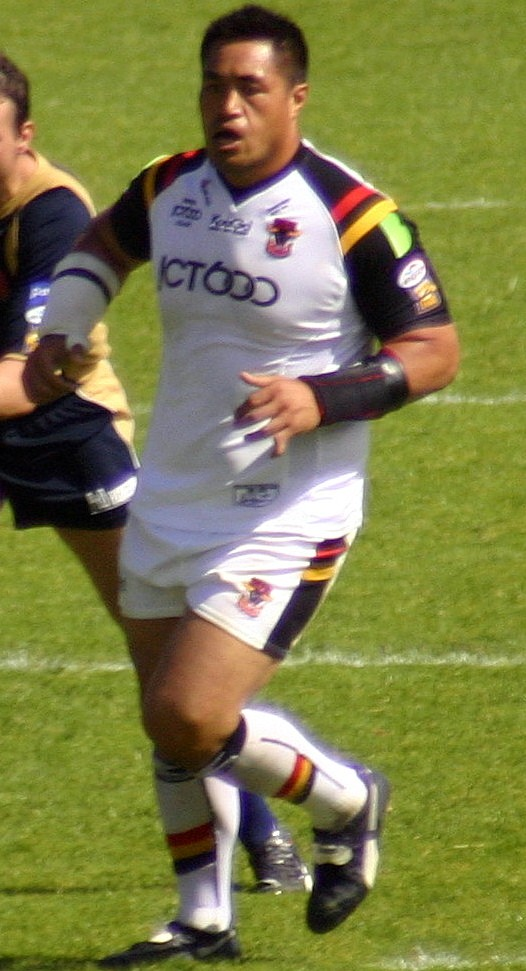
668 Joe Vagana

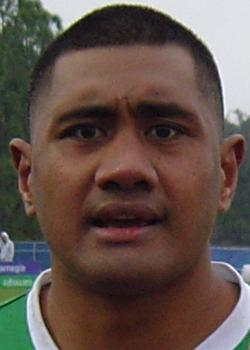
677 Ali Lauitiiti

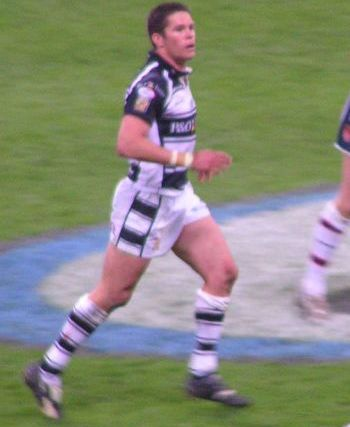
680 Richard Swain

683 Tasesa Lavea

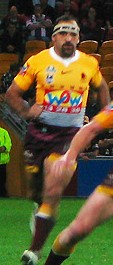
684 Tonie Carroll

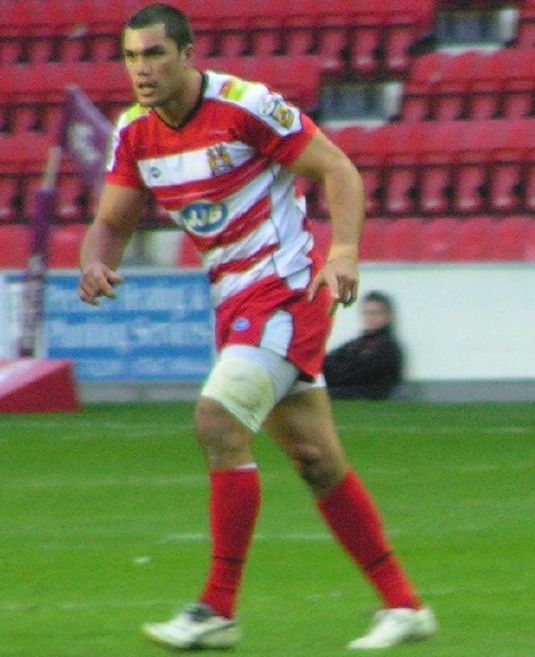
685 David Vaeliki

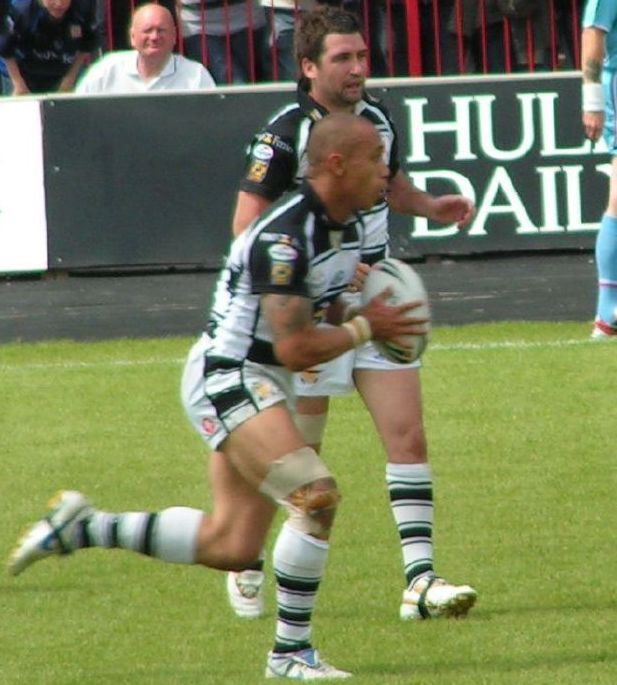
686 Motu Tony

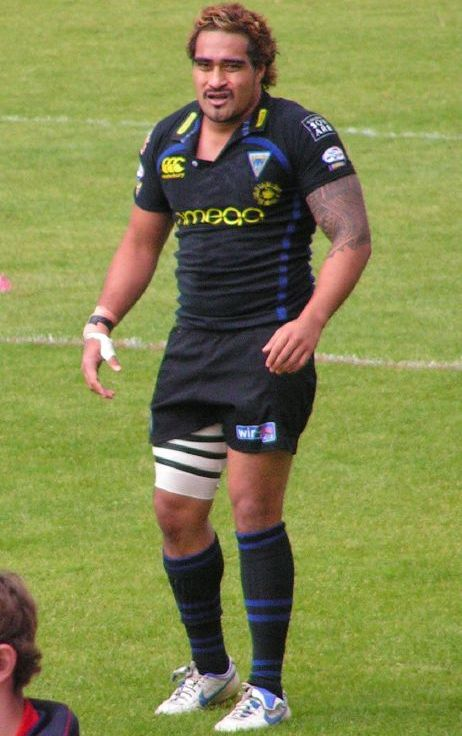
687 Henry Fa'afili

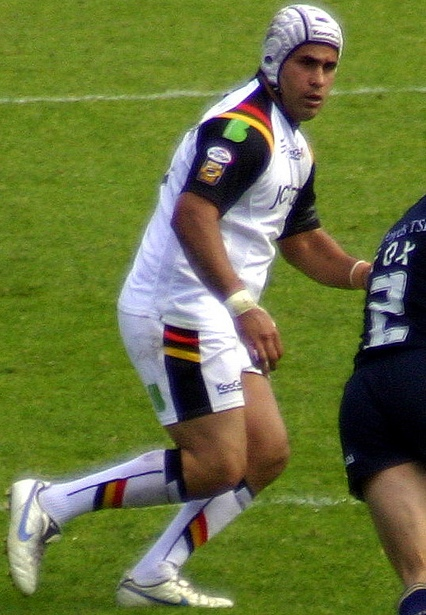
693 David Solomona

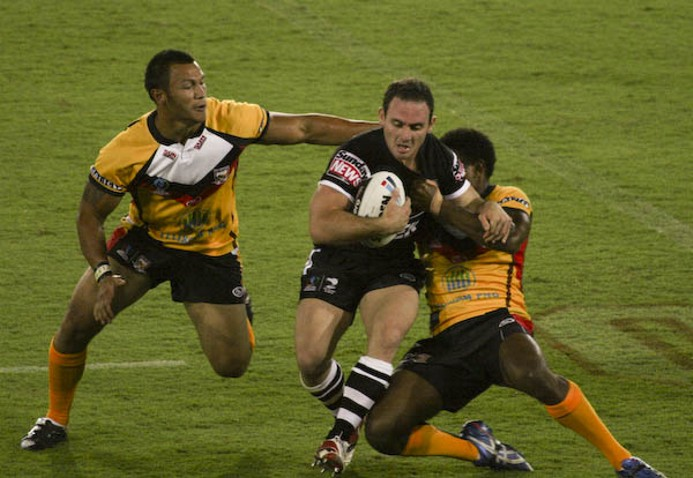
695 Lance Hohaia

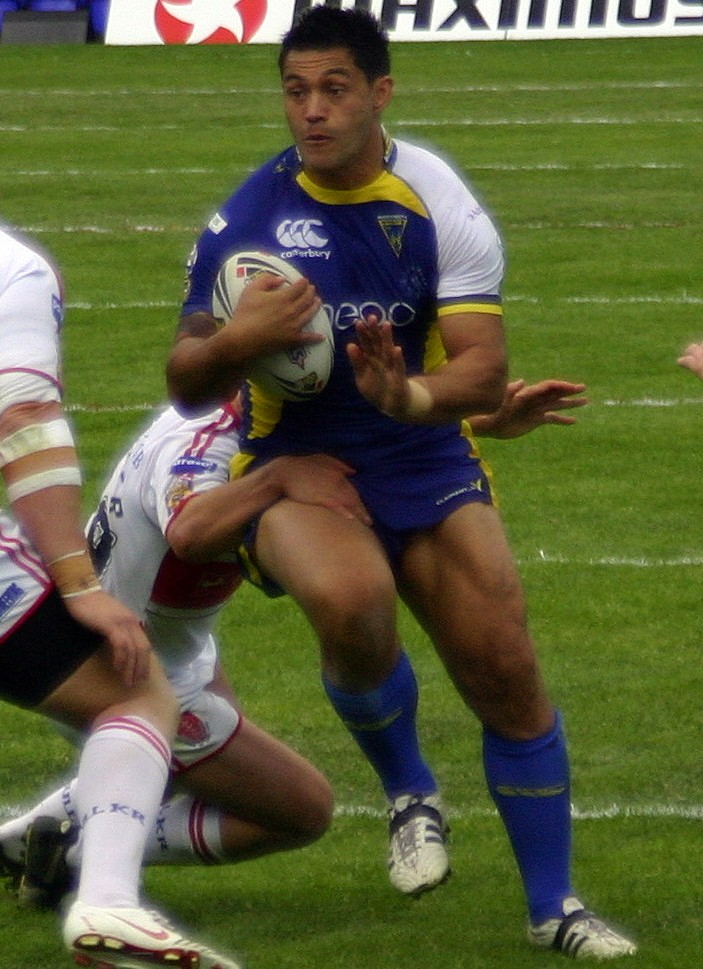
696 Paul Rauhihi

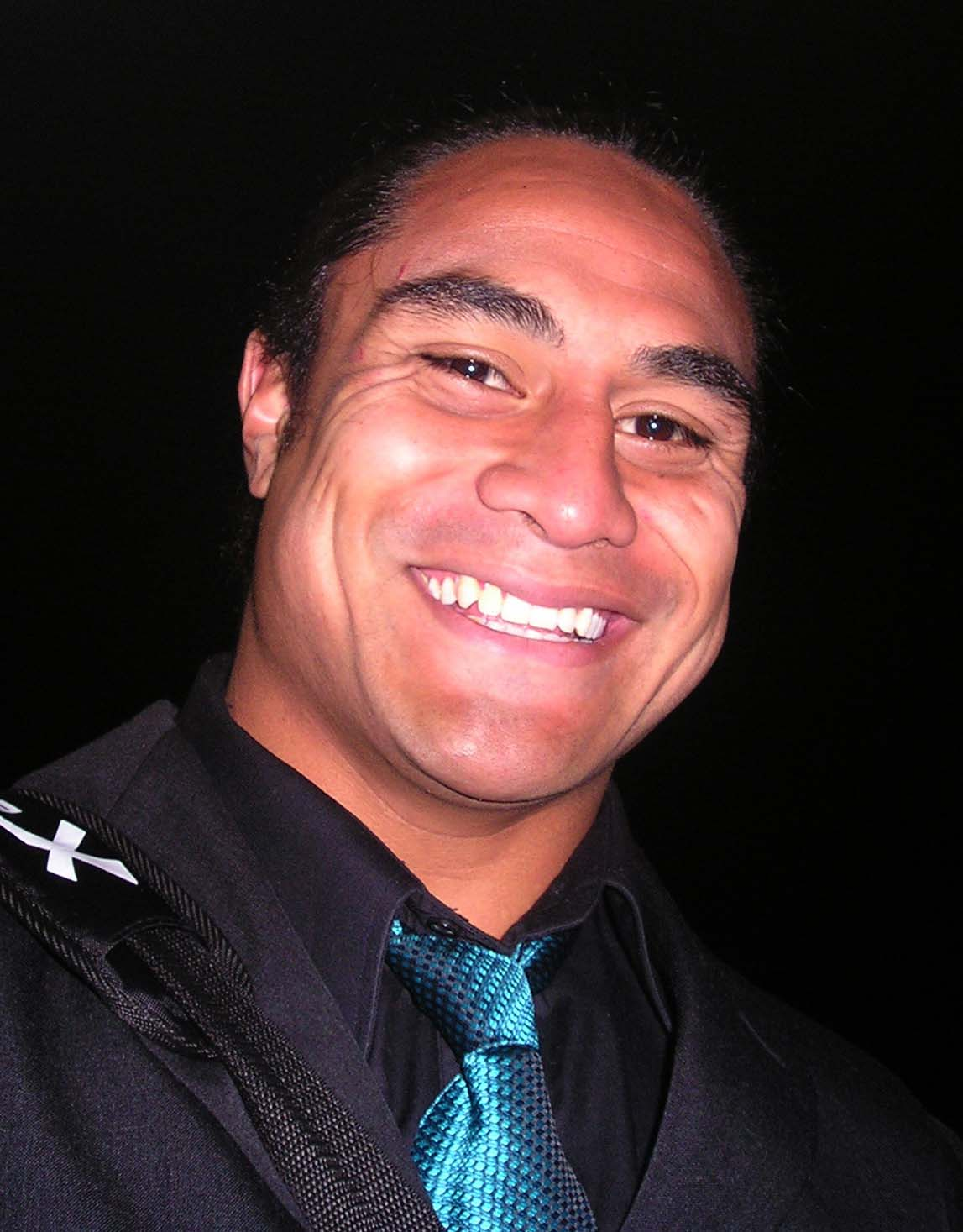
701 Joe Galuvao

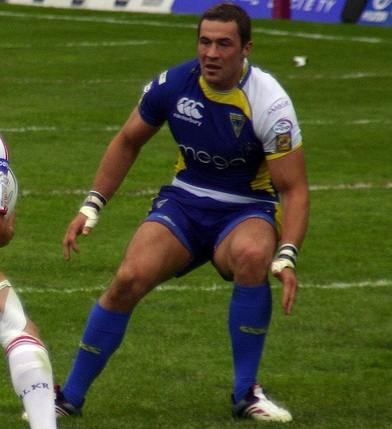
702 Vinnie Anderson

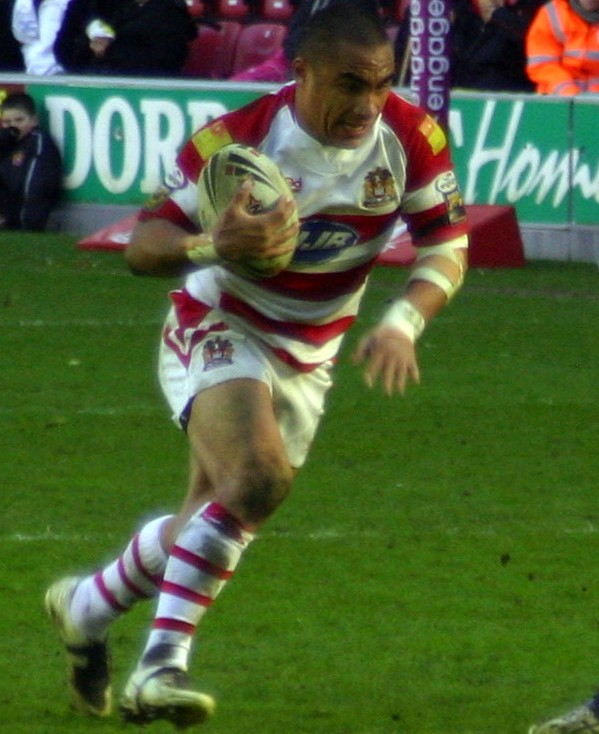
704 Thomas Leuluai

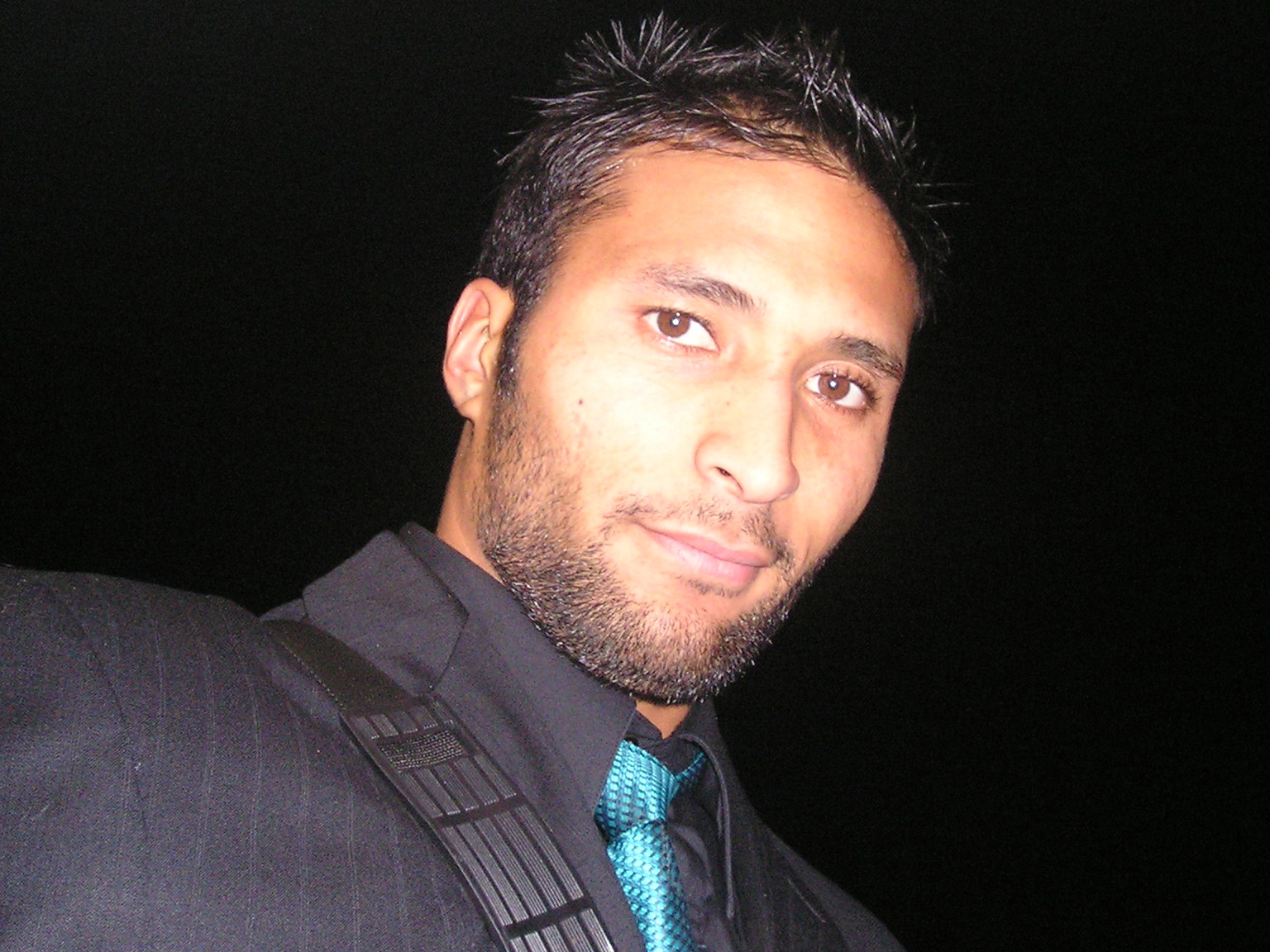
705 Paul Whatuira

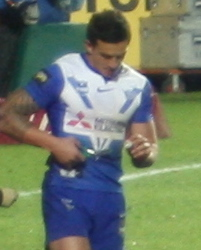
706 Sonny Bill Williams

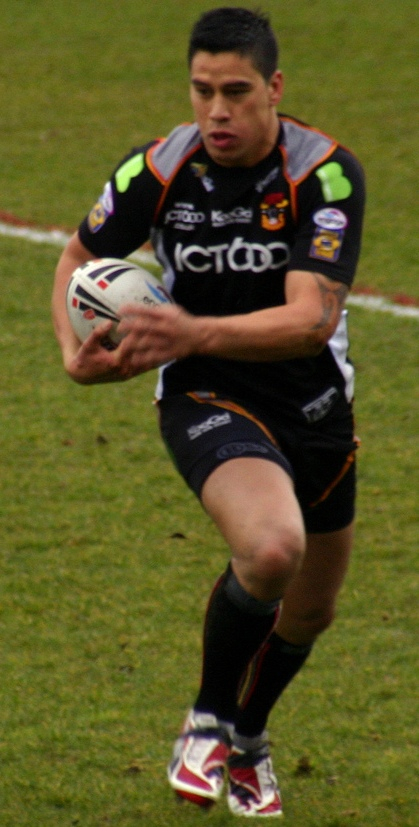
711 Shontayne Hape

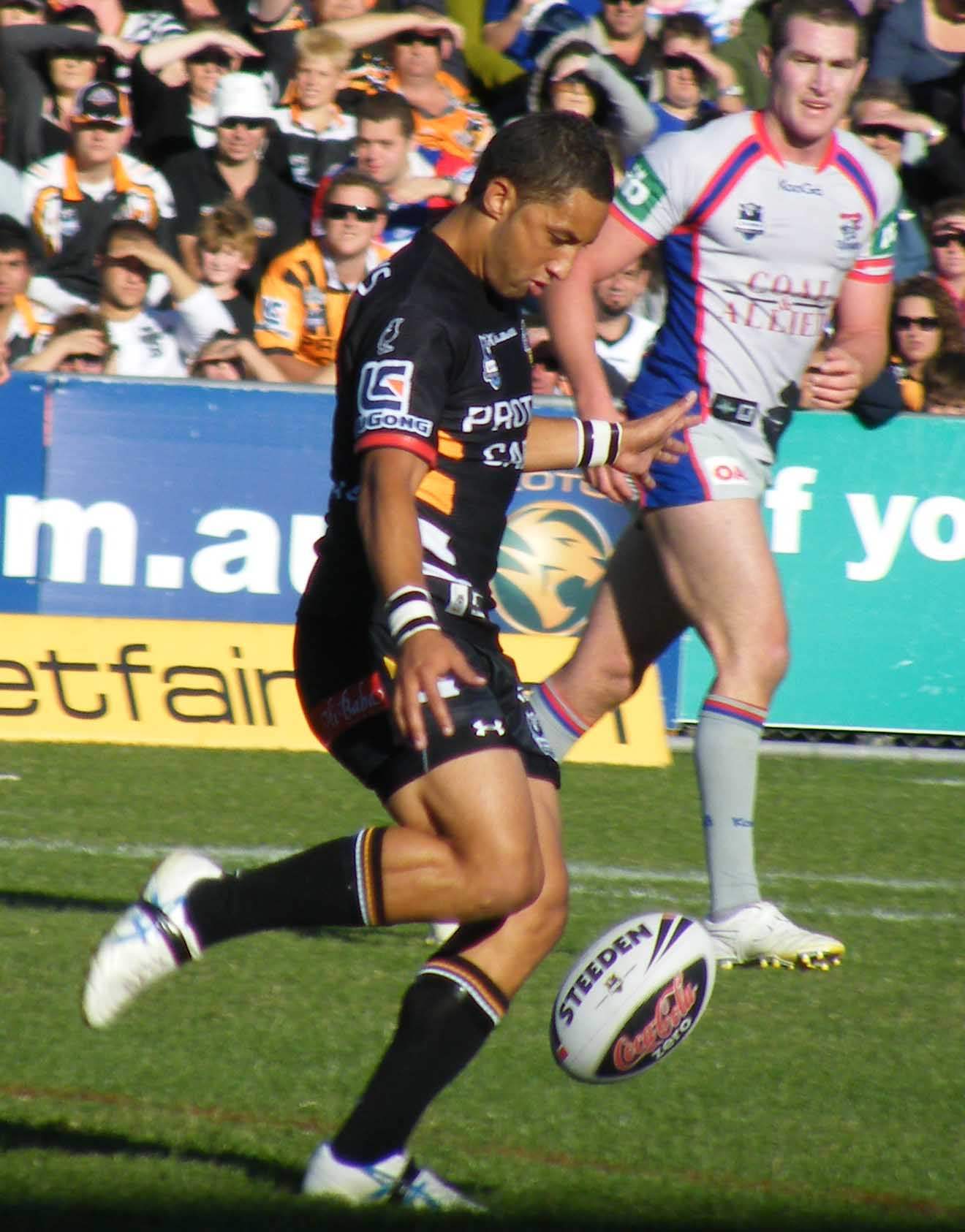
717 Benji Marshall

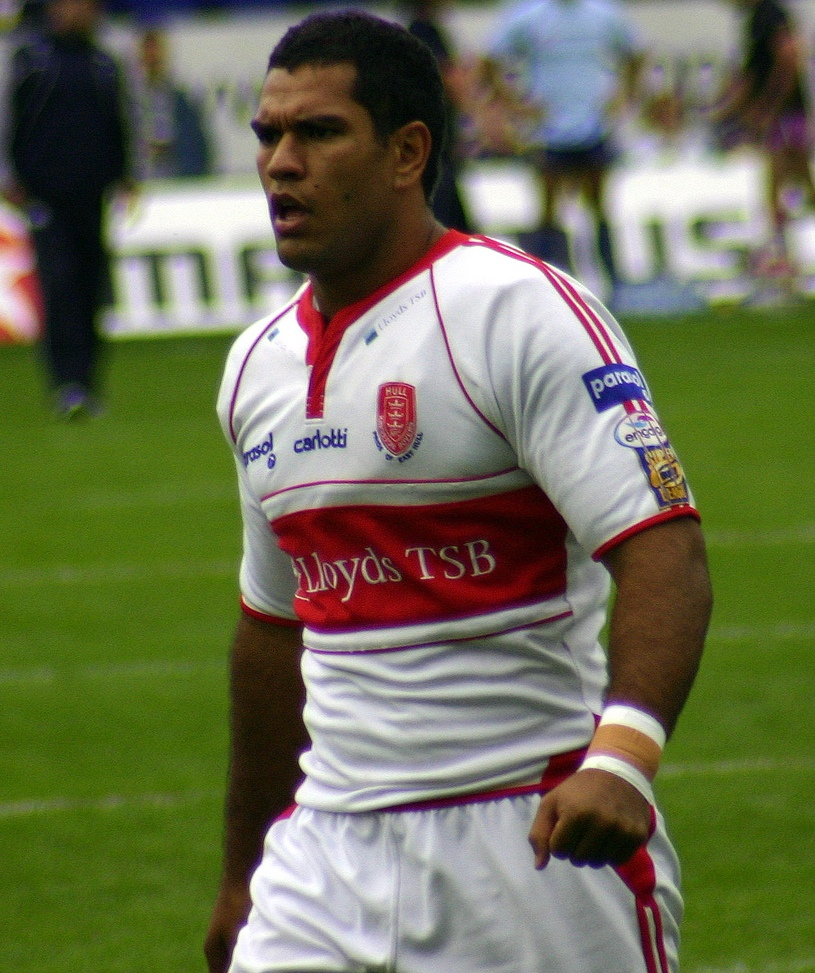
719 Jake Webster

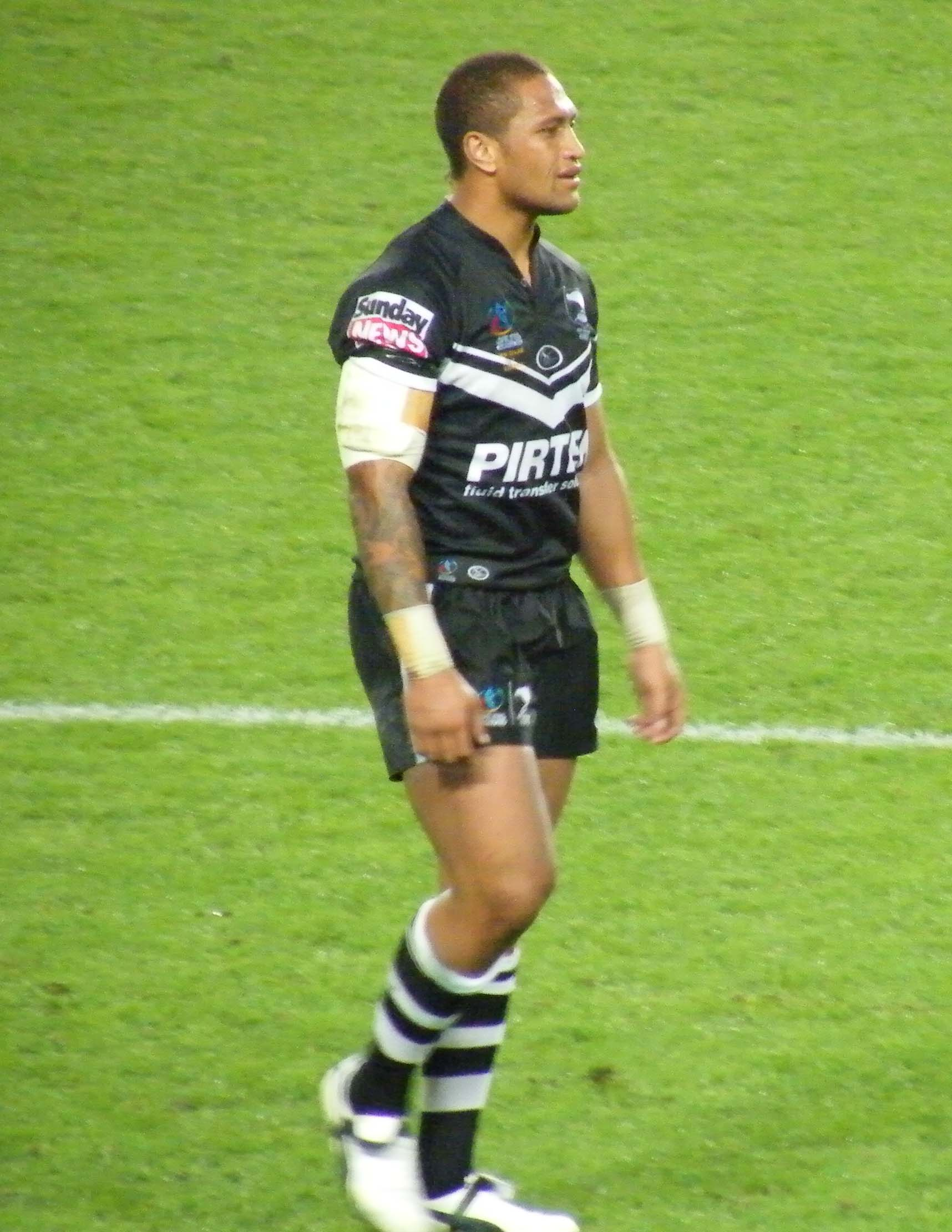
720 Manu Vatuvei

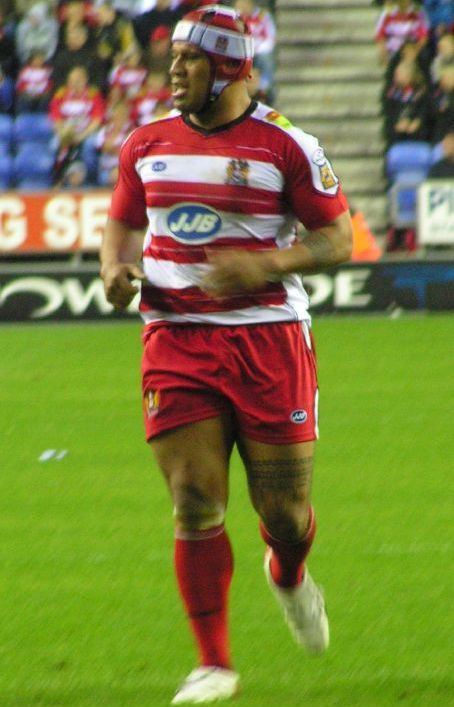
722 Iafeta Paleaaesina

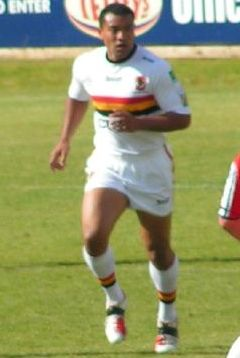
725 Tame Tupou

727 Ben Roberts

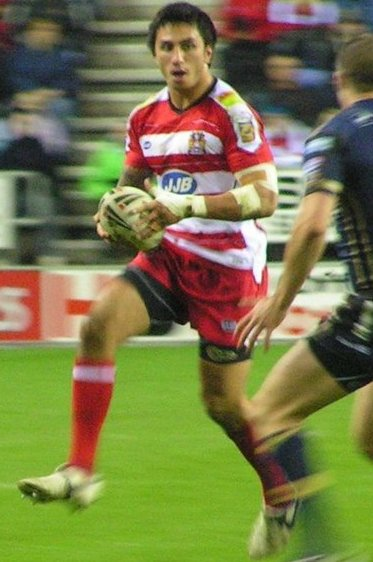
728 Harrison Hansen

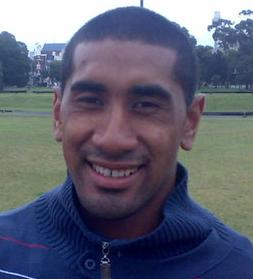
729 Iosia Soliola

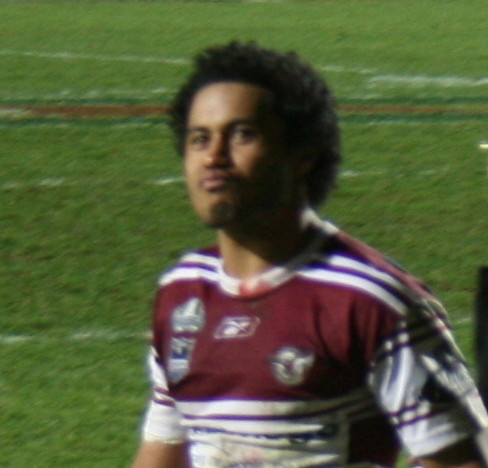
730 Steve Matai

737 Greg Eastwood

738 Luke Covell

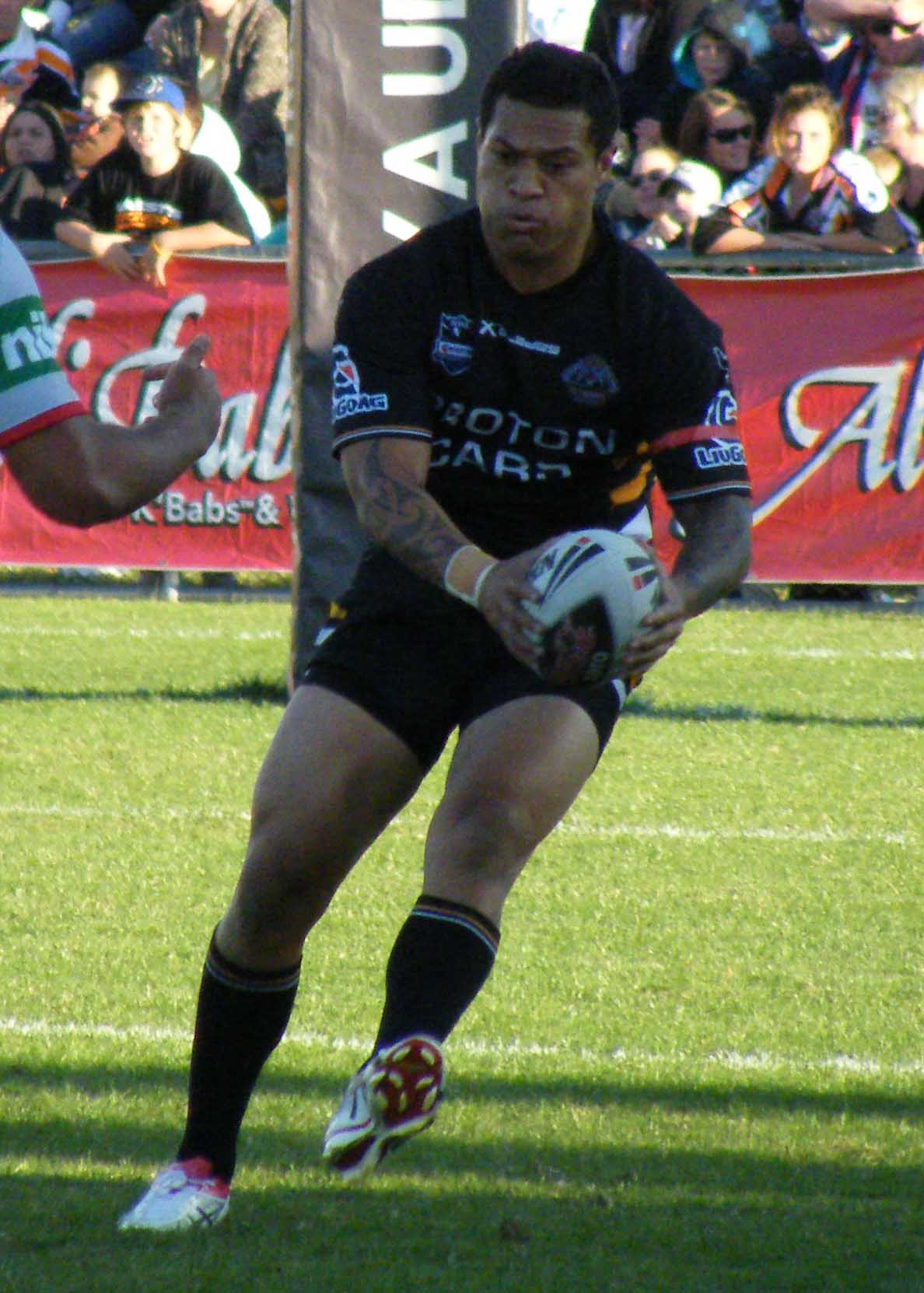
739 Taniela Tuiaki

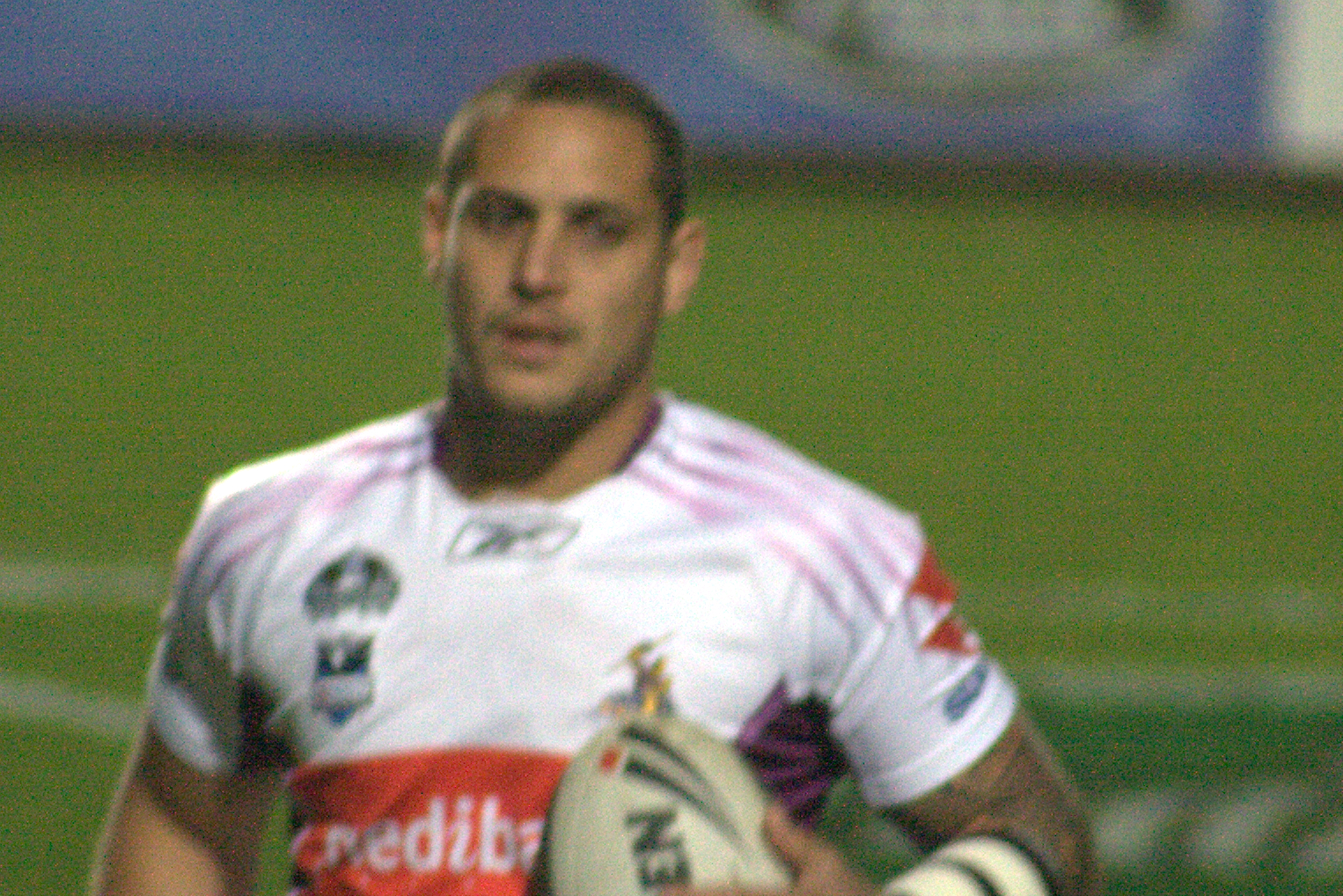
742 Jeremy Smith

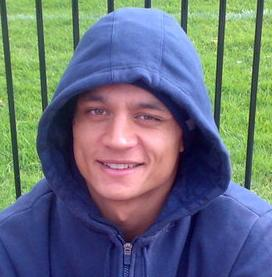
744 Sam Perrett

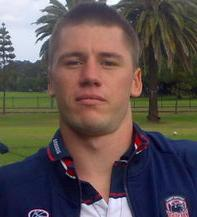
746 Shaun Kenny-Dowall

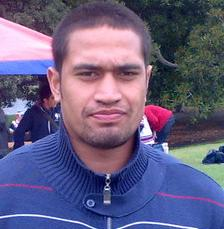
748 Setaimata Sa

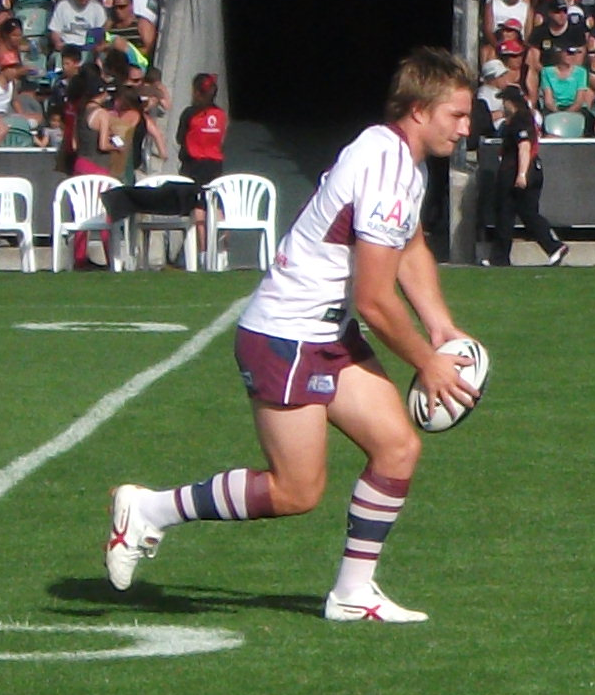
757 Kieran Foran

== Numbering ==
The general rule is that a player does not become a Kiwi until he actually plays in the jersey. However this rule is ignored for players who tour with the squad and do not get capped, these players still qualify as Kiwis.

Due to incomplete records, before 1939 touring teams are listed by alphabetical order and home teams are listed by position from fullback to the forwards. Post War players are listed in order of appearance.
