= 1926–27 New Zealand rugby league tour of Great Britain =

Tour by the New Zealand national rugby league team

The 1926–27 New Zealand rugby league tour of Great Britain was a tour by the New Zealand national rugby league team. The team lost a series 0–3 against the Lions and also lost a test match against Wales. The tour was marred by player dissatisfaction and a strike involving seven players.

== Squad ==
The touring party was;

- Fullbacks: Charles Gregory and Craddock Dufty
- Wing three-quarters: Lou Brown, George Gardiner, Jim Parkes and Jim Sanders.
- Centre three-quarters: Ben Davidson and Wally Desmond.
- Five-eighths: Hec Brisbane, Hector Cole, Jack Kirwan and Stan Webb.
- Halfbacks: Frank Delgrosso and Wilson Hall.
- Forwards: Bert Avery (c), Alphonsus Carroll, Bill Devine, Frank Henry, Ernie Herring, Len Mason, Neil Mouat, Lou Petersen, Arthur Singe, Harry Thomas, Jack Wright and Joe Menzies.

Henry Vivan was originally named in the forwards but had to withdraw because of a family bereavement. He was replaced by Joe Menzies. Vivian never played for the New Zealand side.

== The strike ==
The 1926–27 New Zealand tour of Britain involved several skirmishes within the Kiwi party. Problems began on the boat journey over, with disputes developing about aspects of the trip and a rift developed between tour manager and coach, Australian Ernest Mair, and seven forwards. The disputes continued once the party arrived in Britain, with one of the rebels being involved in a street fight with another member of the tour party after the opening match. In mid-November, following further disturbances which almost led to the tour party being evicted from their Harrogate hotel, it was decided that coach Mair would withdraw from team selection and match tactics for a period of four weeks. The tour, and the costly disputes, continued with the rebels eventually setting sail for home a week earlier than their colleagues. Three months later all seven players were banned for life by the New Zealand authorities. New Zealand did not visit Europe again until 1939.

The seven suspended were Singe, Mouat, Wright, Carroll, Devine, Petersen and English-born Henry, who remained in England after the tour and was allowed to play on by the Rugby Football League.

== Fixtures ==
The New Zealand side played a total of five test matches while on their European tour and one test in New Zealand before leaving.

== Aftermath ==
The "Auckland All Blacks" lost to Auckland 24–21 at Carlaw Park in April after the teams return.
