= Arthur Singe =

New Zealand rugby footballer

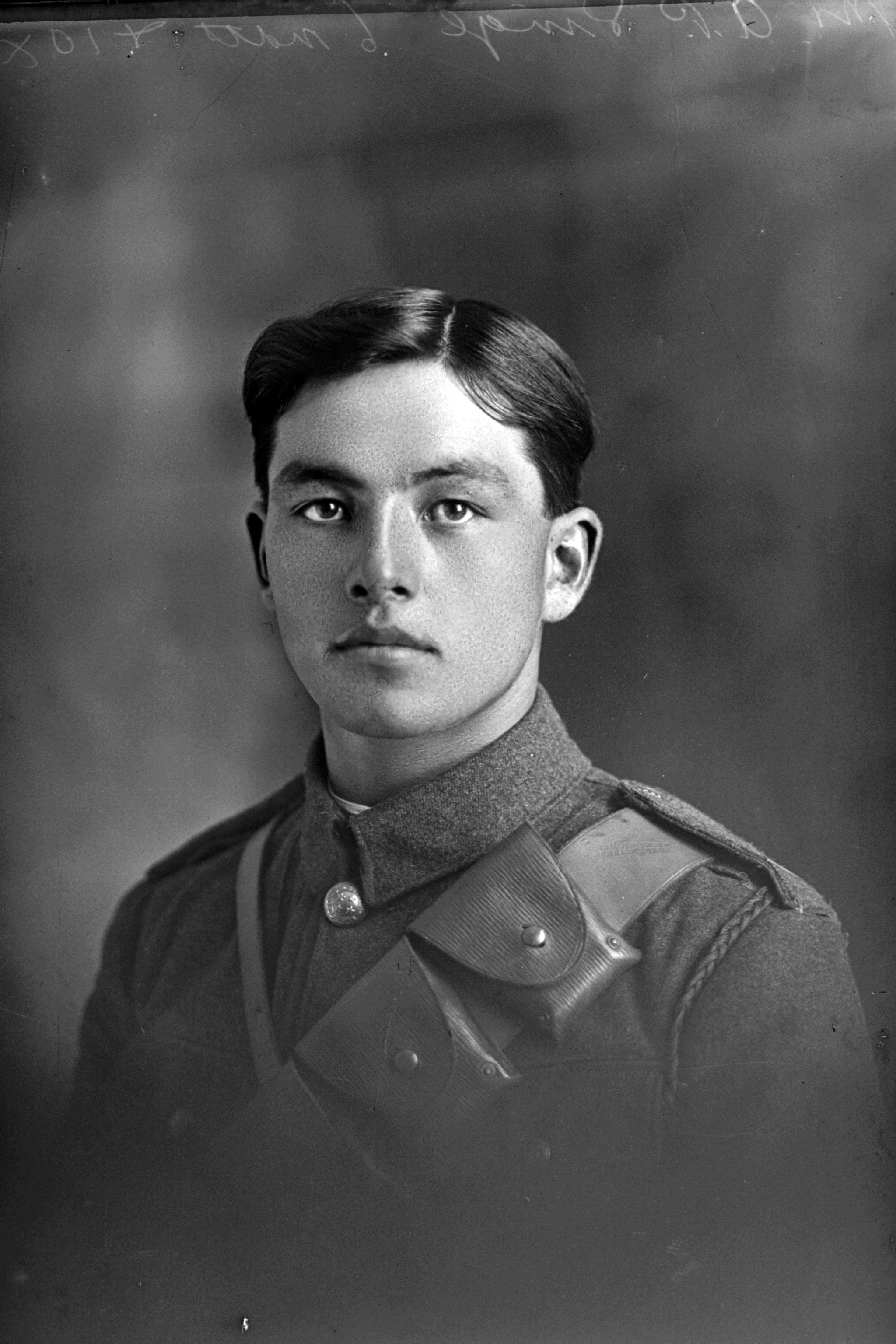
- Portrait of Private Arthur Percy Sing in 1916, taken by Herman Schmidt

Personal information
- Full name: Arthur Percy Singe
- Born: 7 July 1898 Palmerston North, New Zealand
- Died: 5 January 1936 (aged 37) Manukau, Auckland, New Zealand

Playing information
- Height: 5 ft 11 in (180 cm)
- Weight: 13 st 7 lb (86 kg)

Rugby union
- Position: Flanker
Club
Years	Team	Pld	T	G	FG	P
1920	Marist Old Boys	8	5	1	0	18
Representative
Years	Team	Pld	T	G	FG	P
1919–20	New Zealand Army	18	4	0	0	12
1920	North Island	1	0	0	0	0
1920	Auckland	8	2	0	0	6

Rugby league
- Position: Hooker, Second-row
Club
Years	Team	Pld	T	G	FG	P
1921–26	Marist Old Boys RL	46	29	31	0	149
1922	Postal Messengers
1923	City Rovers (Taumarunui)	2	2	1	0	8
	Total	48	31	32	0	157
Representative
Years	Team	Pld	T	G	FG	P
1921–26	Auckland	15	3	8	0	25
1922	Post and Telegraph	2	2	1	0	8
1923	King Country RL	1	0	2	0	4
1925	Auckland B	1	0	0	0	0
1925–26	New Zealand	8	2	0	0	6
1925	Auckland Province	1	1	0	0	3
1926	North Island	1	0	0	0	0

Arthur Percy Singe (7 July 1898 — 5 January 1936) was a New Zealand rugby league player who represented the national side in 1925, becoming Kiwi number 179 in the process. Prior to this he played for the New Zealand Army rugby team in 1919 in Great Britain and South Africa following the end of World War I where he fought. When he returned to New Zealand he played for the Marist rugby club, and then the Marist rugby league club along with several representative sides in both codes.

== Early life ==
Arthur Percy Singe was born in Palmerston North. His correct surname ("Sing") was misspelt as Singe with an 'e' added to the end which eventually became an accepted spelling, which stuck. He was the son of Frances Margaret (née Neary, later Smith by another marriage) and William Ping Sing. Arthur had three brothers named Herbert Stanley Sing, Albert Victor Sing, and Robert Francis "Frank" Sing. Little is known about William Ping Sing save that he was born in China. The brothers' mother, Frances, was of Irish descent, born in New Zealand, and came from a "fighting family". Her grandfather had served in the battle of Waterloo and her father in the Crimean War while other relatives served in the New Zealand Wars.

When Singe enlisted in the army he recorded his birth date as 4 April 1895, which was not his actual birth date. He was officially too young to serve at this time aged 17 years and 4 months old; however, his two older brothers were already at the front. When he was discharged years later he recorded his birth date as 7 July 1898.

He was the chief focus of an article in the Auckland Star on 31 December 1903. Arthur was appearing in court charged with stealing a horse and cart belonging to George Mills along with ten packets of cigarettes from the same man. The description of Singe was "a tiny little chap under six years old" as he was stood in the box. It was stated that he was "a half-caste Chinese, and his father cooks at one of the city hotels". He was apprehended soon after the theft by a constable while struggling to control the horse in Newton. The boy said he was taking the horse home for his father and in the meantime he had been busy handing out the cigarettes to his friends. The sub-inspector stated that it was "simply ridiculous to charge a child at that age with theft". He went on to explain that Singe's mother was away from Auckland and his father was not able to control him and he "simply ran wild, and his father wished to have him sent to an industrial school". The Bench said that the police should have brought him up on some other charge and the case was dismissed.

He and his brothers were educated at the Marist Brothers school. They enlisted in the army they were living together with their mother on Browning Street, Grey Lynn, in Auckland. Arthur was working as a driver for Marriot & Co. in Parnell at the time.

== World War I ==
Arthur Singe enlisted in the army on 16 November 1915 at the age of 17 and served in the Auckland Mounted Rifles, A Squadron with his brother Albert. He left New Zealand on the Aparima on 29 February 1916 and arrived at Suez on 4 April 1916. Arthur then moved on to France and by this time was part of the 2nd Auckland Brigade still with his brother Albert. His brother Herbert who was with the 1st Auckland Brigade at this time was killed during the Battle of the Somme on 3 July 1916. Albert wrote a tribute to his brother which appeared in the Auckland Star in October 1916 while Arthur also wrote a letter to his mother which had details published in the Auckland Star on 24 August 1916. In it, he said that Albert was about a mile away from him at the time and the bombardment was the worst that the New Zealanders had experienced at that part of the line since they had arrived. He said Albert was working a trench telephone when he was killed. He was buried with a friend who had been killed beside him in the Cite Bonjean Military Cemetery, Armentieres, France.

Arthur went on to say he had secured a promise from a young French girl that she would keep the two graves in order for them. He described her as being "like a mother to us... but she is very young". Chaplain Captain Richards conducted the burial service. After the war, Arthur's brother Albert and his wife had a child whom they named Herbert Stanley Singe, in honour of the child's fallen uncle.

Arthur was wounded in France some time in 1916 though the date was unknown. He rejoined his unit on 21 September of the same year.

On 6 February 1918, his military records show that he joined the XXII Corps Cyclist Battalion which was operating in France and "Cyclist Corps" is marked on his gravestone in Waikumete Cemetery in Glen Eden. In total, Singe spent 3 years and 363 days of total service with 3 years and 231 of those days served overseas in Egypt and Western Europe.

He was discharged from active service on 15 November 1919 and moved into the Drill Hall on Rutland Street, Auckland. He was to live here while working for the Defence Department until his marriage in August 1921. Singe worked as a military transport driver for the Defence Department from 8 December 1919 until he transferred to the Post and Telegraph Department on 1 May 1922.

Singe was awarded the Victory Medal and the British War Medal.

== Playing career ==
=== Rugby Union ===
==== Marist Brothers Old Boys Rugby ====
Little is known of Arthur Singe's early years playing the rugby game; however, after he returned from the war he and J O'Brien who had also played with him in the New Zealand Army team were acknowledged at their annual meeting on 22 March 1920. Brother Calixtus "on behalf of the members welcomed Messrs J O'Brien and A Singe back to the club".

==== New Zealand Army in Great Britain and France ====
At the end of World War I the New Zealand armed forces formed several rugby teams to play against a wide variety of opponents through Great Britain and France. Singe was to play for the main New Zealand Army team and later toured South Africa with the side on the way back to New Zealand. He played in the wing-forward position which is now recognised as the flanker position.

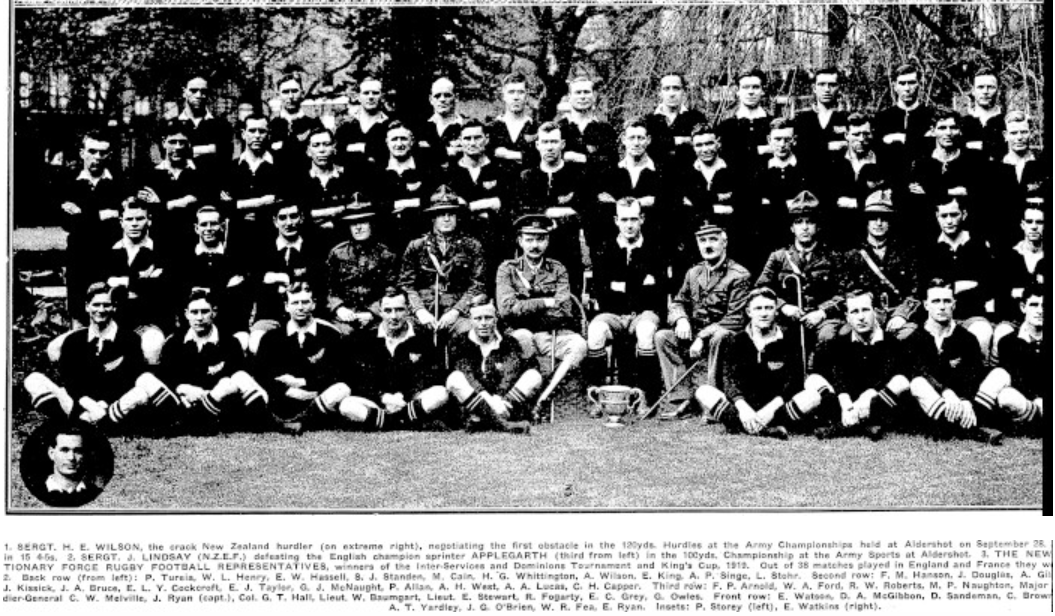
Arthur Singe in the backrow, 3rd from the right in the NZ Expeditionary Force rugby team

Singe played against Wales on 1 January at Cardiff Arms Park in Cardiff with the match being drawn 3–3. He then played in matches against the Australian Imperial Forces, the RAF team, and Yorkshire throughout February and March with the New Zealand side winning all of them comfortably. This was followed by a 6 team tournament which became known as the Kings Cup. Singe played in several of the matches. The first was against South African Forces which was won 14–5 in front of 10,000 at Twickenham. Singe played at wing forward and was described as being very fast. They then beat the English side 6–3 at Inverleith, Edinburgh before a loss to Australian Imperial Forces 5–6.

New Zealand had already qualified for the final which was against England and they won by 9–3 with Singe scoring a try. Of Singe it was said "the wing forward – really better described as a scrummage half-back – is the finest spoiler of open play who has been seen on a football field. Although Pillman manfully tried to check him he smothered practically every attempt of the British half-backs to open up the play from the base of the scrummage. And he was equally good at offensive play, not only in diving for the line, but in swinging the ball clear to his backs from the toes of the opposing forwards". His try occurred after a scrummage near the line where Singe "picked up the ball as it came out from the side of the scrummage, made a six feet dive for the line, and just got there". Reporter F. J. Sellicks said that Singe "was out by himself in more ways than one. He is a great player and impressed everybody". Following the final victory New Zealand played on Twickenham again against the French Army and they won 20–3 with Singe scoring another try before a crowd of 15,000.

The New Zealand side then played against the full Welsh international side at Cardiff Arms Park. Singe again playing in the forwards in a 6–3 victory. A following game against United Services on 28 April saw a New Zealand victory by 20–7 with Singe scoring 2 tries. Several more matches were played before the team to tour South Africa departed.

==== New Zealand Army Tour of South Africa ====
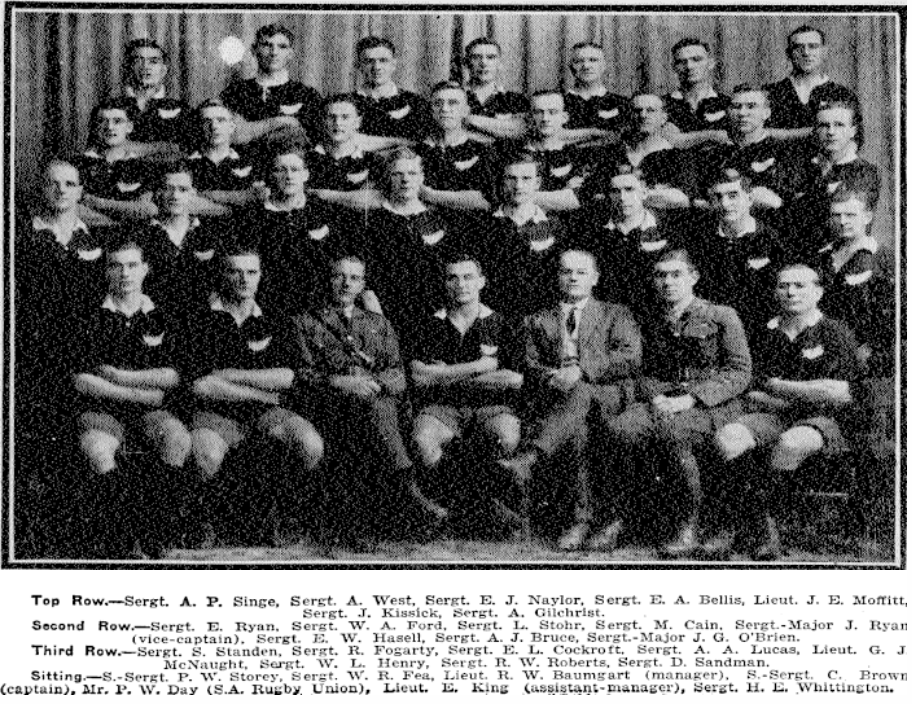
New Zealand army team to South Africa in 1919. Singe is in the back row on the left.

Singe was named in the team to tour South Africa on the way back to New Zealand. They set sail on 7 June. They played 15 matches in total with large crowds at many of them. Singe was a first choice player and he played in the majority of the games including the first two at Newlands which were won 8–6 and drawn 3–3 against Western Province Country and Western Province Town Clubs respectively. He played against Orange Free State at Bloemfontein in a 16–5 win and later played in the last match of the tour against Natal at Durban which was won 11–4 before Singe and the team departed for New Zealand after several years away from home.

==== Matches in New Zealand ====
After the Army team returned to New Zealand they played matches against Auckland and Wellington. They defeated the Auckland side at the Showgrounds 16 points to 6 and then met Wellington at Athletic Park, Wellington. In a pre-match article Singe's play was highly anticipated, the words reading "a rare treat is promised in the play of Singe, wing-forward (the one who beat the Welsh referees with his quickness)". In the match programme he was listed to wear the number 8 jersey. The Military Service team as they were named was to beat the current Ranfurly Shield holders comfortably by 23 points to 8 in front of 10,000 spectators which included the Prince of Wales who was to become the future King (Edward VIII), and New Zealand Prime Minister W. F. Massey. Many years later in 1940 in reference to the army team Mr. J. H. Ranui was to write in the Auckland Star "Two great forwards of the Army team, Alfie West and Arthur Singe, have crossed the Great Divide, but they have left pleasant memories of outstanding personalities who played a game that forms character, and if England won battles with men from the playing fields of Eton, likewise New Zealand won hers from the Rugby fields of her provinces".

==== Return to Marist Brothers Old Boys and Auckland Rugby ====
In the March AGM of the Marist Brothers Old Boys rugby club Singe was welcomed back and elected to the management committee and was also chosen as a club delegate. Following Singe's return from the Servicemen match against Wellington he debuted for Marist in a match against College Rifles. He helped the team to a surprise 14–8 win though he played at first five and the writer for the Auckland Star said that he looked "out of his place".

In June, Singe was nominated by the Auckland Rugby Union for the North Island team to play the South Island in their annual fixture to be played at Wellington on 26 June. He was not initially chosen in the side however after Lucas was unable to make the trip he was pulled into the squad where he was listed in the reserves. With 10 minutes left in the match Jim Donald sprained his ankle and Singe took his place. The North Island team won by 12 points to 3 before a crowd of 7,000.

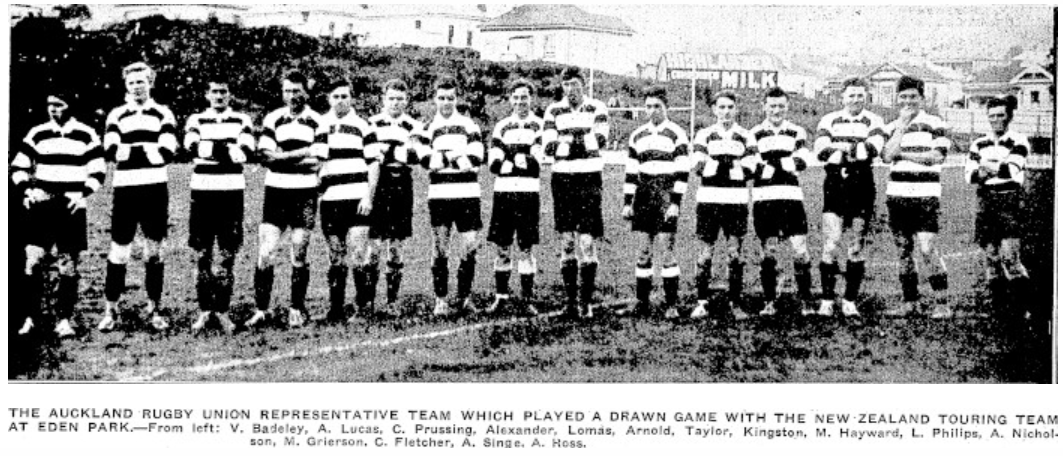
Singe second from the right in the Auckland team to play New Zealand on 10 July

Singe was then named to make his debut in the Auckland team to play Thames. Auckland won the match 22–15 with Singe heavily involved, breaking away with the ball several times and scoring a try early in the second half. He was then selected for the Auckland team to play against New Zealand at Eden Park on 10 July in the "Rover" position. The match was drawn 11–11 in front of 11,000 spectators. The following weekend Singe turned out for Auckland at Eden Park again with a large crowd of 12,000 on hand to witness Auckland win 9–3 over Taranaki. He then travelled to Thames to play the local side and Auckland went down 20 points to 6.

Auckland senior club rugby matches then resumed and Singe scored 2 tries in a 26–6 win over Newton. He then played for Auckland in a Ranfurly Shield match against Wellington at the Auckland Domain. Wellington won the match in front of 14,000 spectators by 23 points to 20. Singe again crossing the line for a try after he picked up a loose pass from a break and scored. Singe continued his try scoring run with a "splendid try" for Marist in an 11–3 loss to competition leaders Grammar Old Boys on 14 August, at Eden Park. He was again selected for the Auckland team to travel to Wellington to play for the Ranfurly Shield for the second time in the season. Wellington easily won the match 20–3 in front of 15,000 spectators at Athletic Park. Singe played well in the losing side where he was said to be "Auckland's brilliant wing-forward" and "the most prominent forward on the field". The Auckland team then travelled to New Plymouth where they met Taranaki and won 17–11. Singe scored an "easy try" after following up a kick from Greville in front of 4,000 fans at Pukekura Park. The Hawera and Normanby Star described Singe's display as "one of the finest exhibitions of aggressive and spoiling play ever seen here for a long time". Two days later Singe was in action again for Marist against College Rifles at Eden Park where he scored 2 tries in a 14–8 win. The following weekend Singe played his final representative game for Auckland when they defeated Bay of Plenty 34–17 at Eden Park. In the meantime Marist's season had concluded without Singe required to play as Ponsonby defaulted in the last round meaning they finished 4th of the 7 competing clubs.

=== Rugby League ===
==== Marist Old Boys and Auckland ====
At the start of the 1921 season Arthur Singe made the switch to rugby league. There had been mention in the press that he was unlucky to miss out on selection for the New Zealand team to tour Australia. While there were murmurings that he was unhappy himself with being overlooked and that he was disappointed to only be in the reserves for the North Island v South Island match where players were staking a claim to make the New Zealand team. In an 18 April edition of the Auckland Star about the Marist Old Boys rugby league club's prospects for the season they noted that there was "a certain amount of secretive whispering, which all lends to give the impression that one or two well-known rugby men are going to join up". They were of course referring to Arthur Singe.

His debut match in the league code was for Marist against City Rovers. He was involved in a rush with Bill Stormont which resulted in Stormont scoring a try in a 22–5 loss in front of 5,000 spectators at Victoria Park. The Auckland Star noted that the two of them who were rugby forwards were misplaced in the five eighth line. Singe's first try in the green of Marist was to come the following week when they trounced the new Fire Brigade club team 43 to 8 on the Auckland Domain. A week later he kicked 3 conversions and a penalty in a win over Newton Rangers at Victoria Park in front of an excitable crowd which invaded the field before he could convert the third try. He was to score 5 tries and kick 6 goals for Marist during the 1921 season.

On 21 May Singe was selected to play for Auckland after just four games of rugby league. This was coincidentally the same number of club games it had taken before he was selected to the Auckland rugby side. Their opponent was the New Zealand team which was preparing to tour Australia. The Auckland team went down 22 points to 16 on the Auckland Domain with Singe playing in the forwards but going off injured before halftime with an injured shoulder. Somewhat bizarrely the New Zealand Rugby Union at their executive meeting on 9 June asked the Auckland Rugby Union "to ascertain if Singe had played League as alleged; if so, to give him fourteen days to show cause why he should not be suspended". Given he had played five club matches and a match for Auckland in front of several thousand people on each occasion, and had been named in the matches by the main newspapers each week the answer should have appeared more obvious. It would ultimately take them most of the year and some very slow back and forth with the Auckland Rugby Union to confirm he was playing league and to ban him from rugby union.

In July Singe played a match for Auckland against Wellington which they won 31 to 8 in the first ever representative game on Carlaw Park. He next played for Auckland against King Country and he scored a try "after a lone handed effort" and kicked a conversion in a 58–25 win. His last game of the season came for Auckland in their final match against South Auckland for the Northern Union Challenge Cup. Auckland won 35–13 and retained the shield.

In 1922 Singe began his season with the Marist side in a 22 April match with Fire Brigade where they won 19 to 6. He scored a try on full-time and kicked an earlier conversion. Singe was to score 7 tries, and kick 3 conversions and 2 penalties for Marist in the 1922 season. Marist finished 3rd behind perennial powerhouses of Auckland club league at this time City Rovers and Ponsonby United. They were also knocked out of the Roope Rooster by Ponsonby in a 16–13 loss with Singe scoring a try.

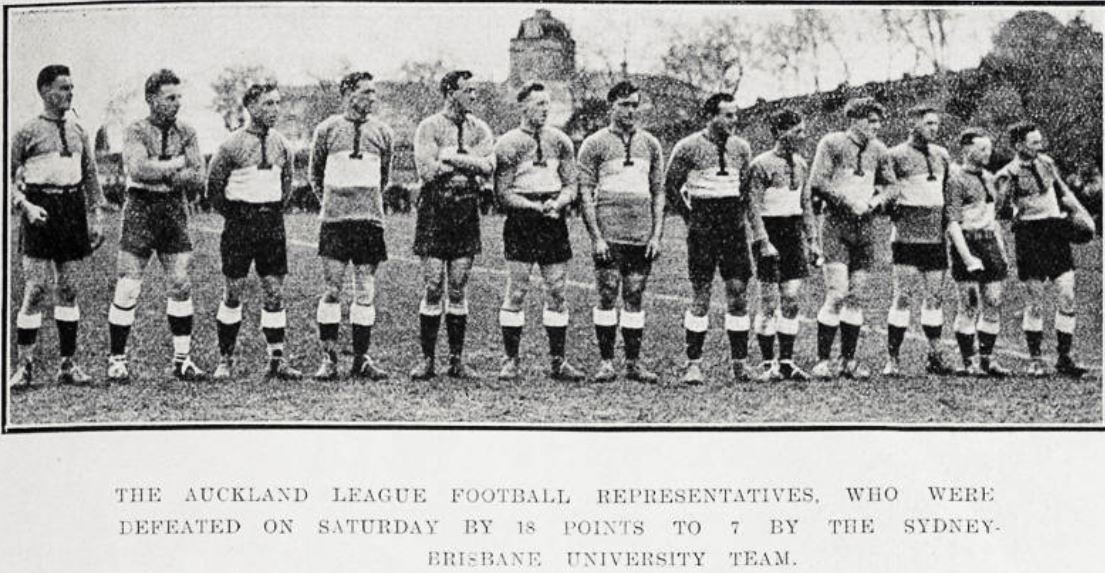
Singe 7th from the right in the Auckland team to play the 2nd match against the Australian Universities side at the Auckland Domain on June 24, 1922.

Singe played 5 matches for the Auckland team during the season. He played in all 3 matches against the touring Australian University side. Auckland lost the first 2 matches 12–23, and 7–18 respectively. In the second match Singe "kicked a fine goal" in front of a large crowd estimated at around 13,000 on the Auckland Domain. Auckland won the 3rd game by 24 points to 16. He then played in the Auckland team against Cambridge at Carlaw Park. The Cambridge team was no match for the home side with Auckland winning 73 points to 29. Singe converted one of the 17 Auckland tries. His final game in the Auckland jersey for the year was in a Northern Union Challenge Cup match against Hawke's Bay which Auckland won 23 points to 5 on 19 August at Carlaw Park.

==== Post and Telegraph Team ====
Singe had also been playing in the Post and Telegraph competition for the Postal Messenger team on Wednesdays during the latter part of the season. It was a six team competition organised by the Post and Telegraph Department for their workers from different parts of their organisation. They were competing for the Engineers Cup, with matches played on Victoria Park. On 17 August he played in the competition final for the Messenger side against the Workshops team at Carlaw Park. He was then selected in the Post and Telegraph representative team alongside Wally Somers and Bill Davidson to play against the Wednesday business league representative team. They played matches against them on 30 August and again on 20 September. Singe's team won the first match 25 to 10. The latter match was a curtain-raiser to Auckland Province v New South Wales. Singe's Post and Telegraph side won 33 points to 11 with him scoring 2 tries and kicking a conversion.

==== Move to King Country, Rugby League and Cricket ====
Singe moved to live in the King Country in the summer of 1922/1923, possibly being posted there for work reasons as was common at the time. He played cricket for Kaitieke (a small rural community 30 km south of Taumarunui) against King Country on 3 February 1923 where he was said to be one of Kaitieke's most successful bowlers. Singe was then selected to represent Taumarunui in a cricket match against Hamilton (the teams were also named as King Country and Waikato respectively) at Seddon Park in Hamilton on 28 February. The match was for the Challenge Shield and he took 4 for 49 runs, and 0 for 29 with the ball and scored 16 and 5 with the bat.

On 19 May Singe appeared for the Taumarunui based City Rovers rugby league team. He scored all of their points with 2 tries and a conversion in an 8–13 loss to the Hauaroa B team in Taumarunui. Then he captained the Taumarunui representative rugby league team against Hamilton on 21 July in a match for the Endean Shield at Hinemoa Park, Hamilton. The Taumarunui team went down heavily by 43 to 7 with Singe playing five-eighth kicking a penalty and a conversion. They had 7 players absent through illness on account of the influenza epidemic. The Waikato Times two days later told their readers that Singe was "a former prominent player in Auckland league circles. In the rugby code Singe was also a noted figure, and during the war was a member of the New Zealand Army team which made a good name for itself on foreign fields".

In 1924 there are no records of Singe playing rugby league. The game was barely played in the King Country area in this era with the teams he had played for made up mostly of rugby players trying their hand at the game. As Singe was banned from playing rugby he may not have found any opportunities to continue playing the sport in that area.

==== Return to Auckland and New Zealand test debut ====
In the summer of 1924/25 Singe returned to Auckland and played cricket for the Post and Telegraph senior team in the Suburban Association competition. In a two-day match against Ellerslie he took 5 wickets and scored 11 runs.

Singe then made his return to the rugby league field when he was included in the Marist team for a pre-season match on 19 April against the Marist team from Christchurch. Singe's Marist won by 17 points to 6. The match marked the opening of Monica Park in Christchurch. Playing alongside Singe would be New Zealand internationals Jack Kirwan, Charles Gregory, and Jim O'Brien.

During the 1925 season Singe was to play in 14 matches for Marist, 5 matches for Auckland, 1 match for the Auckland B team, and a match for Auckland Province. But more importantly he was to play 2 matches for New Zealand which were both recognised as tests. In a round 4 game for Marist against Athletic at Carlaw Park he scored 3 tries in an 18–5 win, 2 after winning the ball from kicks and 1 after a scrum near the Athletic line. Over the course of the year he was to score 8 tries and kick 8 goals for Marist finishing 8th on the try scoring list and 7th on the point scoring list. On 4 June Sing's well known teammate Bill Stormont died after a battle with rheumatic fever. Marist cancelled their match scheduled for 2 days later with Richmond Rovers and later in the year Singe played in a match against Ponsonby for the newly created Stormont Shield which is still competed for today in Auckland rugby league.

He played in an Auckland B v Auckland C match on 27 June before being picked in the Auckland team to play against New Zealand who were preparing for their tour of Australia. He scored the first try of the match after receiving a pass from Ivan Littlewood in a 9–16 loss at Carlaw Park. He then played in a 24–16 win over South Auckland in a Northern Union Challenge Cup match before another game against the New Zealand side after they returned home from their tour. The Queensland team was about to arrive in New Zealand and both sides were preparing to play against them. This match saw 15,000 in attendance at Carlaw Park and Singe kicked 3 conversions and a penalty in a heavy 17–41 defeat.

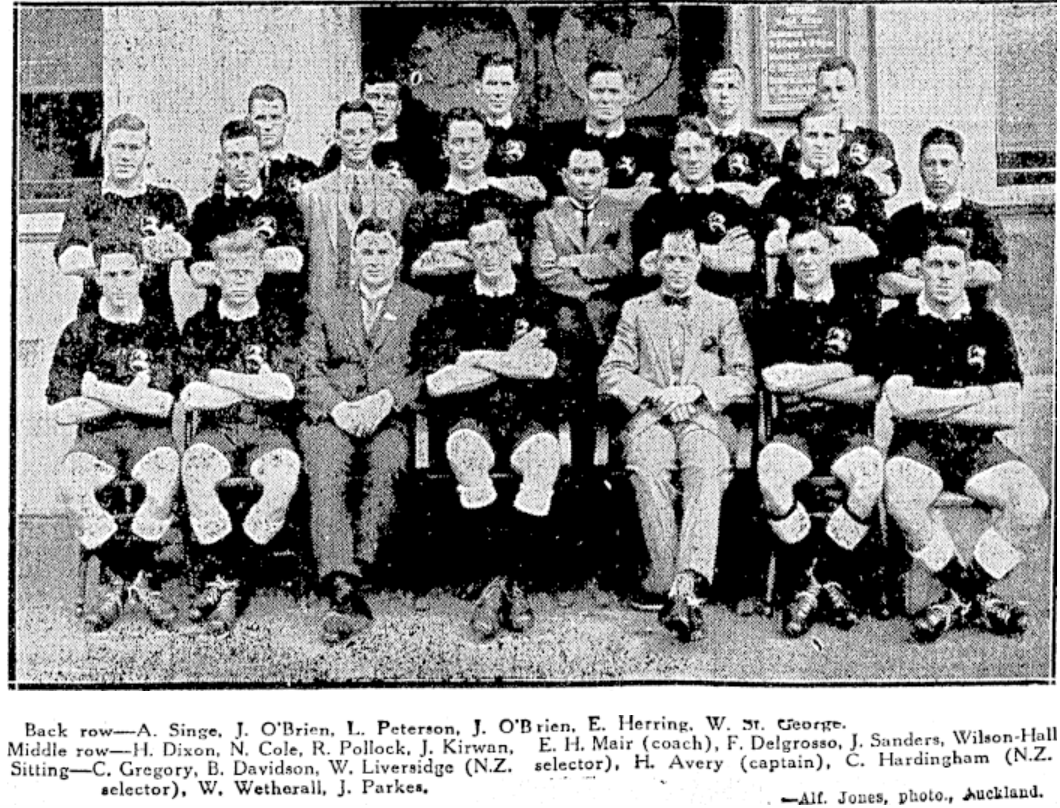

Singe clearly impressed the selectors as he was then selected to make his debut for New Zealand against Queensland. Although Queensland was a state side they were considered to be the strongest team in the world and at the time New Zealand Rugby League bestowed test status on the matches. On 5 September in front of 18,000 spectators Singe, playing at hooker, scored a try in a 24–24 win at Carlaw Park. His try was from following up fast after Bert Avery had kicked the ball past the fullback and winning the race to the ball over the line. New Zealand was coached by an Australian Ernest Mair from Toowoomba. He was to later lead the side on their disastrous tour of England. Singe played Queensland three more times. The next time was for Auckland which they drew 18–18. He then played in the second test on 12 September once again at Carlaw Park. New Zealand went down 35–14 with Singe again in the hooker position.

His last match against the Queenslanders was on 10 October for the Auckland Provincial side who were thrashed 14–54 in front of 9,000 spectators. Singe scored the provincial team's first try. In between matches Singe had been part of Auckland's successful defence of the Northern Union Challenge Cup after beating South Auckland 36–19, where he scored yet another try.

In 1926 Singe again played for Marist though it was reported before the start of the season that he had applied for a transfer to the Richmond Rovers club but was refused by Marist. Richmond was based in the Grey Lynn area where they remain today which is where Singe had lived in his younger years. Singe was in fine form for Marist throughout the first half of the season scoring 2 tries and kicking 18 goals in just 8 matches, 6 of which they won.

After the round 7 matches the Auckland team was selected for their match against South Auckland. Of the players selected it was said "as far as the forwards are concerned, several players, on this season's form, practically pick themselves, and in that category can be mentioned Singe, of Marist – the best forward in Auckland at the moment...". The match with South Auckland was ostensibly a trial to help pick the New Zealand team to tour England. Auckland won 49 to 15 and the match was so lopsided that Auckland gave 5 forwards to the South Auckland team at halftime to try and make it a fairer contest. Singe remained on the Auckland side and kicked the final conversion of the match. He was said to be one of the best forwards in the match along with Jim O'Brien, and Bert Avery. Singe was then selected for the North Island team to play the South Island. An enormous crowd of 18,000 was in attendance at Carlaw Park to witness the North Island win 31 to 22. Singe was regarded as the best forward in the Northern side along with Clarke. The final game before the touring team was selected was between a Probables and Possibles teams on 10 July. Singe was part of the Probables side which went down 32–15 in what was to sadly be his last ever match on New Zealand soil. In a highly anticipated team naming 200 people went to Carlaw Park to hear the names read out with Arthur Singe named among the forwards.

==== Tour of England ====
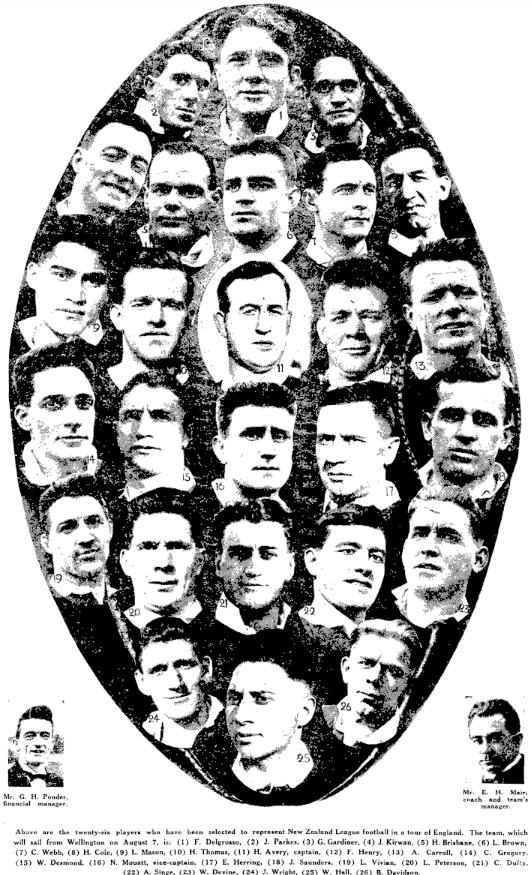
The NZ team to tour England and Wales with Arthur Singe, second row from the bottom, second from the right (22)

The New Zealand team departed on 3 August on board the Aorangi. The manager and coach was once again Ernest Mair who had been called in from Australia to provide some experience for such an important tour. This appointment was to be a crucial factor in the acrimony to come. There were issues right from the beginning of the tour with players said to be upset by having to pay for their own laundry bills on board the ship which were more expensive than land based facilities. Then they were then annoyed at having to perform the haka whenever they were instructed to and to 'dress up' for meals on the voyage. They travelled to Suva, Fiji, where they played an exhibition match before moving on to Hawaii, and then Vancouver where they arrived on 20 August. They then travelled across Canada via Winnipeg and Montreal using the Canadian National Railway to connect with another steamer which would take them across the Atlantic Ocean. The team arrived in Southampton on 2 September and opened the tour with a match against Dewsbury on September which they won 13–9 with Singe playing hooker and having a hand in the final New Zealand try. Singe broke his thumb in the match and it was thought that he may miss eight weeks. He was indeed to miss a huge portion of the tour. Singe's regular omission from the side was to become a theme for the tour under the selection of Mair and partly contributed to him later being part of the striking group of players. A match report for their tenth game of the tour against Bramley noted that Singe was suffering from "an attack of the flu" but "should be available again soon". Singe had still just played in the one match to that point.

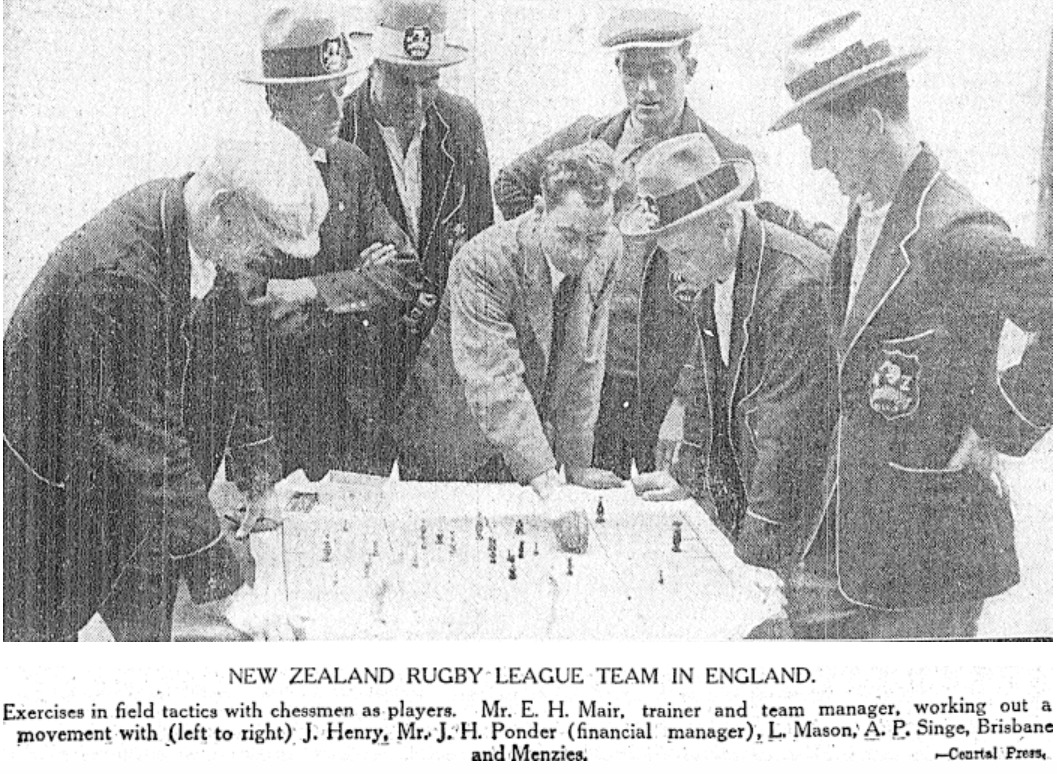

Trouble had begun to boil among the team in late October, and a cable was received from London intimating that four of the team were to return home. The players were not named but it was speculated that they were from a group of several players that was regularly missing selection. Singe was named among the possible players but it was also noted that he had been injured. He had only played in one match since the 2nd test at this point which meant that after 16 tour matches he had played in just two in total. Then on 9 November a cable was sent to New Zealand stating that seven forwards had "sent an ultimatum threatening to embark for home on 19 November unless their demands are met". The seven forwards were Singe, Neil Mouat, Lou Petersen, Jack Wright, Alphonsus Carroll, Bill Devine, and Frank Henry. The English Rugby League had tried to mediate with a meeting held on 28 October in Manchester but had ultimately been unsuccessful. The seven players had totally refused to train or play under Ernest Mair's control. Mair then withdrew himself from the selection committee and said that he would be "passive" for a period of time. He was formally suspended by the English Rugby League who acted on behalf of the New Zealand Council throughout the tour after being authorised to do so. Some of the issues stated had been the strict discipline throughout the tour starting with the travel to England. Examples cited were the 11pm curfews, and Mair's Australian training strictness which was "unpalatable to New Zealanders, who were accustomed to different methods". Singe and the other striking players promised to "do their best now that Mr. Mair has resigned the selectorship".

Singe was then selected to play in the second test against England in the second row after Bill Devine was chosen for the hooker spot. The match was played at the Boulevard ground in Hull on 13 November. The Evening Star correspondent said that "both Singe and Peterson, who were playing their first game for some considerable time, were playing great games, their tackling being deadly". Early in the second half Singe made a break and passed to Bert Avery who scored which made the score 13–6 to England. New Zealand would go on to lose 11–21. After the game an "old international" player in the Observer wrote that "the New Zealand team is purely amateur. The England team was entirely composed of paid professional players" and they went on to say that "Dufty, Petersen, Singe, and Avery, of the New Zealanders... were good enough for any team in any country...". It was also stated that Singe and Avery were the most prominent of the New Zealand side.

New Zealand's internal issues were common knowledge by this point and it was affecting public interest in their matches. They had also been performing relatively poorly and only 8,000 turned up to watch the test match. Singe played again in the next match alongside five of his fellow dissenters. They played against Wigan Highfield on 17 November and were victorious by 14 points to 2. In one section of play Singe was described as playing a "hard, bustling game, [and] came away with the ball at his feet, and dribbled many yards". He was again in the side three days later in a 19–17 loss to Batley in "atrocious" conditions with "heavy rain and a wet ground". Singe was to play his third consecutive match days later against Keighley where he was again one of the "most prominent" forwards. He scored a try in a 23–3 win. He then missed the match against Swinton, the test against Wales, and the St Helens match. His next game was against Wigan where New Zealand was comprehensively outplayed going down by 36 points to 15. Fullback Charles Gregory was injured early in the match and eventually succumbed to it with Jack Kirwan moving back to fullback which necessitated Singe moving in to the three-quarter line due to his mobility. Kirwan was later cut badly over his eye requiring stitches and Singe again had to move into the fullback position. As substitutions were not allowed during the second half of rugby league matches at this time it meant that New Zealand was now playing with only 4 forwards and 11 players in total and Wigan ran away with the match.

It was at this point in the tour when things took a severe turn for the worse. Mair resumed his managerial duties and immediately five players refused to play. Amongst them was Singe and given there were several injuries in the side by this point of the tour where 25 matches had already been played it meant that only 15 men were available to choose from for the match with the Yorkshire representative team. New Zealand subsequently lost the match 17 points to 16. An article appearing in the Evening Post on 20 December went into considerable detail about the issues that had arisen throughout the tour and speculated that their match with Hunslet may be their last which would result in a £2,000 loss for the New Zealand Rugby League. This did not turn out to be the case but laid bare the significance of the problems. After the refusal of the players to play in the match with Yorkshire, Mair decided that six of them should be sent home but "the English League intervened, and informed Mr. Mair that it would not be responsible for the return fares of the players. There upon there was another conference at which the English League Council considered the claims of the disaffected players and the financial position of the tour. It was around £2,500 short of breaking even and so they made the decision to carry on without Mair and the striking players. On 22 December the New Zealand Rugby League Council endorsed the suspension of Mair along with 5 striking players which included Singe. The Council decided to carry on the tour with Mr. G. H. Ponder the financial manager of the tour managing the side. Mair and Ponder were the New Zealand Council representatives during the tour due to the distance from New Zealand and it was consequently them and the English League Council that had to make these decisions with the New Zealand Rugby League largely being relegated to observers from afar.

Then on 13 January a report out of London quoted Singe as saying "we were left at Harrogate at Christmas almost penniless. The Welsh Rugby League Council was very good, and presented money to take us home. We claim that the best team was not played throughout the tour". Meanwhile Neil Mouat had stated that he had no intention of publicly defending himself or the other dissentients, but they have been grossly misjudged. Recently we frankly stated our case to the Rugby League Council, who are now laying the matter before the New Zealand Council demanding an inquiry into the conduct of the tour" of which it was thought there would be a £1,500 deficit to take care of.

Singe, along with Mouat, Devine, Thomas, Petersen, and Carroll all then returned to New Zealand ahead of their teammates and were accompanied by Mr. Ponder the manager. Bert Avery, the captain after arriving home, said "it has been a wonderful trip... our team was a great one if all had held together, and I think we did very well... we were left with only five forwards to carry on for two months. Players were being shifted about all over the field, and under the circumstances the record of winning 50 per cent of the matches must be considered satisfactory". Others who had been on the tour felt that Singe and the other "malcontents" were wrong with the attitude they adopted, and that "there may have been conditions imposed which we did not entirely agree with, but most of us were prepared to put up with them, and it was the same for all".

==== Life ban from rugby league and lifting of it in 1962 ====
After an inquiry by the New Zealand Rugby League on 2 March by the New Zealand Rugby League that lasted for 4 hours it was decided to ban Arthur Singe along with his fellow 6 strikers for life. The banned men were represented by Mr. E. Inder and Singe was present with 5 other strikers (Frank Henry had remained in England where he was from). After the inquiry Mouat, who had been named vice-captain at the start of the tour and who was the chief leader of the strikers, said that the only question considered during the hearing had been whether or not they had gone on strike rather than why they had gone on strike and they were "not allowed to bring evidence of justification". The official press agent for the team Mr. J. O'Shaughnessy gave a lengthy statement on his version of events detailing many of the issues on the tour. He cited the players having to pay their own laundry bills on board, having to wear collars and ties at meals in spite of the tropical heat, and being asked to perform the haka in public multiple times. On one occasion at the Vancouver railway station Singe and Mouat refused to perform it with Mouat saying he felt they were "cheapening the haka and the team was not a theatrical troupe". Then players were absent from training on several occasions including Singe, Wright, and Mouat. They were called before a full meeting of the team and claimed to have slept in, this was not accepted and they were each fined 10s. The three of them claimed that this was unfair treatment and asked for their tickets back to New Zealand. After Mair had been stood down for a month the original agreement was for there to be a review of the situation at the end of the month but Mair resumed his previous role without a review. O'Shaughnessy stated that the seven players notified the managers that unless the situation was reviewed as previously agreed upon they would again refuse to play. The English League Council decided to suspend Mair for a further month but "thereupon Mr. Ponder, financial and co-manager with Mr. Mair, suspended the seven players" and "Ponder stopped their allowances ... three weeks before Christmas. Thus for eight weeks in England, and six weeks on the boat coming home the malcontents have had no allowance paid to them". The English League stepped in and gave each of them £10. Acting on legal advice the New Zealand Rugby League never released Mair's version of events.

On 30 March Singe was "warned off" Carlaw Park for life. An amendment that he only be excluded for three years was defeated. Thus Singe's oval ball career came to an end. Banned from rugby union for playing rugby league, and banned for life from rugby league.

At the end of 1927 Singe turned out for the Greenlane second grade cricket team where in a match with the Public Works Department he scored 17 runs and took 2 wickets for 8 runs. There is no mention of Arthur Singe on a sporting field beyond this though many of his nieces, nephews, and descendants have carried on the family's sporting exploits.

In 1962 the New Zealand Rugby League administration lifted the ban on Singe and his 6 teammates. By this time however 4 of the 6 who had returned to New Zealand had died.

== Personal life and death ==
Arthur Singe married Hazel Lily (Lockwood) Plant on 3 August 1921 at Kingsland, Auckland. They had three children, Norma Marie Singe (1922–1986), Barbara Singe (1928–2004), and Arthur Barry Singe (1932–1999). It is unknown if his father William (who died in 1929) attended.

Arthur died on 15 January 1936, aged 37. His cause of death was recorded as "general paralysis of the insane", a severe form of dementia. He was buried in the soldiers section at Waikumete Cemetery in Glen Eden. Newspapers (Evening Star and Thames Star) 10 days after his death said "the death has occurred at Auckland of Mr A.P. Singe, wing forward of the New Zealand Army Rugby team which won the King's Cup in 1919". The Auckland Star wrote a more lengthy obituary. While the Evening Post said that he had been in bad health as "the result of war injuries for some months prior to his death".

Arthur's brother Frank moved to live in Wellington where he lived with his wife and children. A year to the day after Arthur Singe's death, Francis and his family placed a notice in the newspaper remembering Arthur. It stated "In loving memory of our dear brother and uncle, Arthur, who died on 15 January 1936. Ever remembered by Frank, Jessie, Mick and Shona". Arthur's other brother Albert moved to Te Araroa after the war in 1919. When Arthur was completing his discharge papers he wrote that "A.V. Singe, Te Araroa" was his present employer indicating that he may have intended to move there to work at the time. Albert continued to live with his family in the Poverty Bay area for decades to come. As well as working in the Poverty Bay area he also refereed rugby.

After Arthur's death in 1936, his wife Hazel remarried on 1 August 1939 to George Geoffrey Plant. She died on 30 May 1997 in Auckland aged 93.

Arthur's son, Barry Singe, played rugby league in Auckland too. He represented Auckland on several occasions. On 17 May 1953 he played for Auckland against the West Coast in a 12–2 win where he scored a try. Barry was also chosen in the North Island side the same season. He played well in a 20–23 loss to the South Island. He represented Auckland in a 4–26 loss against the touring Australian team in the same year, while in 1958 he played in a 16–15 win for the Ellerslie senior side against Manly-Warringah.

Arthur and his brothers were the subject of an article on the Auckland War Memorial Museum Online Cenotaph on 7 February 2017. Helene Wong and Ant Sang wrote comics which appeared in the Being Chinese in Aotearoa exhibition with one of them on the story of Herbert Stanley Sing in the First World War. It was titled "What did you do in the War, Goong Goong?".
