= Jack Kirwan (rugby league) =

NZ international rugby league & union footballer

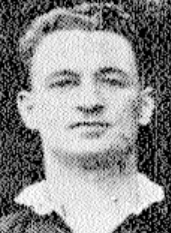

Personal information
- Full name: John Patrick Kirwan
- Born: 31 March 1896 Reefton, New Zealand
- Died: 20 October 1968 (aged 72) Auckland, New Zealand

Playing information
- Height: 175 cm (5 ft 9 in)
- Weight: 80 kg (12 st 8 lb)

Rugby union
- Position: Centre
Club
| Years | Team | Pld | T | G | FG | P |
|---|---|---|---|---|---|---|
| 1915 | Tokomaru City | 3 | 2 | 0 | 1 | 9 |
| 1920–23 | Dannevirke Old Boys |
| 1924 | Marist Old Boys | 7 | 2 | 0 | 0 | 6 |
| | Total | 10 | 4 | 0 | 1 | 15 |
Representative
| Years | Team | Pld | T | G | FG | P |
| 1915 | Waiapu (sub union) | 1 | 0 | 0 | 0 | 0 |
| 1920 | Southern Hawke's Bay | 1 | 0 | 0 | 0 | 0 |
| 1920–23 | Hawke's Bay | 17 | 3 | 0 | 0 | 9 |
| 1921 | Hawke's Bay/Poverty Bay | 1 | 2 | 0 | 0 | 6 |
| 1923 | HB/PB/EC combined | 1 | 0 | 0 | 0 | 0 |
| 1924 | Auckland Probables | 1 | 0 | 0 | 0 | 0 |
| 1924 | Auckland | 9 | 1 | 1 | 0 | 6 |

Rugby league
- Position: Stand-off, Centre
Club
| Years | Team | Pld | T | G | FG | P |
|---|---|---|---|---|---|---|
| 1924–28 | Marist Old Boys (ARL) | 36 | 13 | 0 | 0 | 39 |
Representative
| Years | Team | Pld | T | G | FG | P |
| 1925–26 | North Island | 2 | 1 | 0 | 0 | 3 |
| 1925–27 | New Zealand | 28 | 9 | 0 | 0 | 27 |
| 1925–26 | Auckland | 2 | 0 | 0 | 0 | 0 |
| 1926 | NZ Probables | 1 | 0 | 0 | 0 | 0 |
| 1927 | NZ XIII (AKL Reps) | 1 | 0 | 0 | 0 | 0 |

Coaching information
Representative
| Years | Team | Gms | W | D | L | W% |
| 1932 | Marist Old Boys | 16 | 11 | 2 | 3 | 69 |
- Relatives: John Kirwan (grandson); Niko Kirwan (great grandson)

John Patrick Kirwan (31 March 1896 – 20 October 1968), more commonly known as "Jack Kirwan", was a rugby union and rugby league player. He represented the Hawke's Bay province and Auckland in rugby union before switching to rugby league in 1924. He was selected for the New Zealand team in 1925 becoming Kiwi number 174 in the process. His grandson was also named John Kirwan and he went on to become a famous All Black in the 1980s and 90s before also switching to rugby league.

== Early life ==
John Patrick Kirwan was born on 31 March 1896 in Reefton on the West Coast of the South Island. His parents were Kate and Robert Kirwan. Kirwan had 3 brothers and 4 sisters; Michael, Ellen, Mary, Kate, Anastasia, Robert, and Edward.

Kirwan was a telegraphist who worked in Tokomaru Bay on the East Coast of the North Island in 1914 when he was 18 years of age. He was then transferred to Napier. After serving in World War I he returned to New Zealand and began working at the Dannevirke Post Office.

== Rugby beginnings on the East Coast ==
Jack Kirwan moved to Tokomaru on the East Coast of the North Island in November 1914 where he began working at the local post office. During the 1914/15 summer he played cricket for Tokomaru Bay and then began playing for the Tokomaru City rugby union team in the Turnbill Cup against Waima and Wanderers. He scored tries in games against Wanderers on 8 May, and Waima on 5 July.

Kirwan was aged 19 by this time and in the match with Wanderers it was said that “a conspicuous feature of the game was the brilliant football played by Jack Kirwan (City). It was admitted by the most competent judges that a better exhibition had not been seen on this ground”. Kirwan was then selected for the Waiapu representative team to play against Tolaga Bay. In September, Kirwan was fare-welled at a function in his honour at the Magnet boarding house. He had proved to be a very popular figure in the local Tokomaru community. He was being promoted and transferred to Napier.

== World War I ==
World War I was well underway and Kirwan enlisted in the New Zealand Army on 26 June 1916 aged 20. He trained at the Featherston Military Camp before leaving New Zealand for Europe on 2 January 1917.

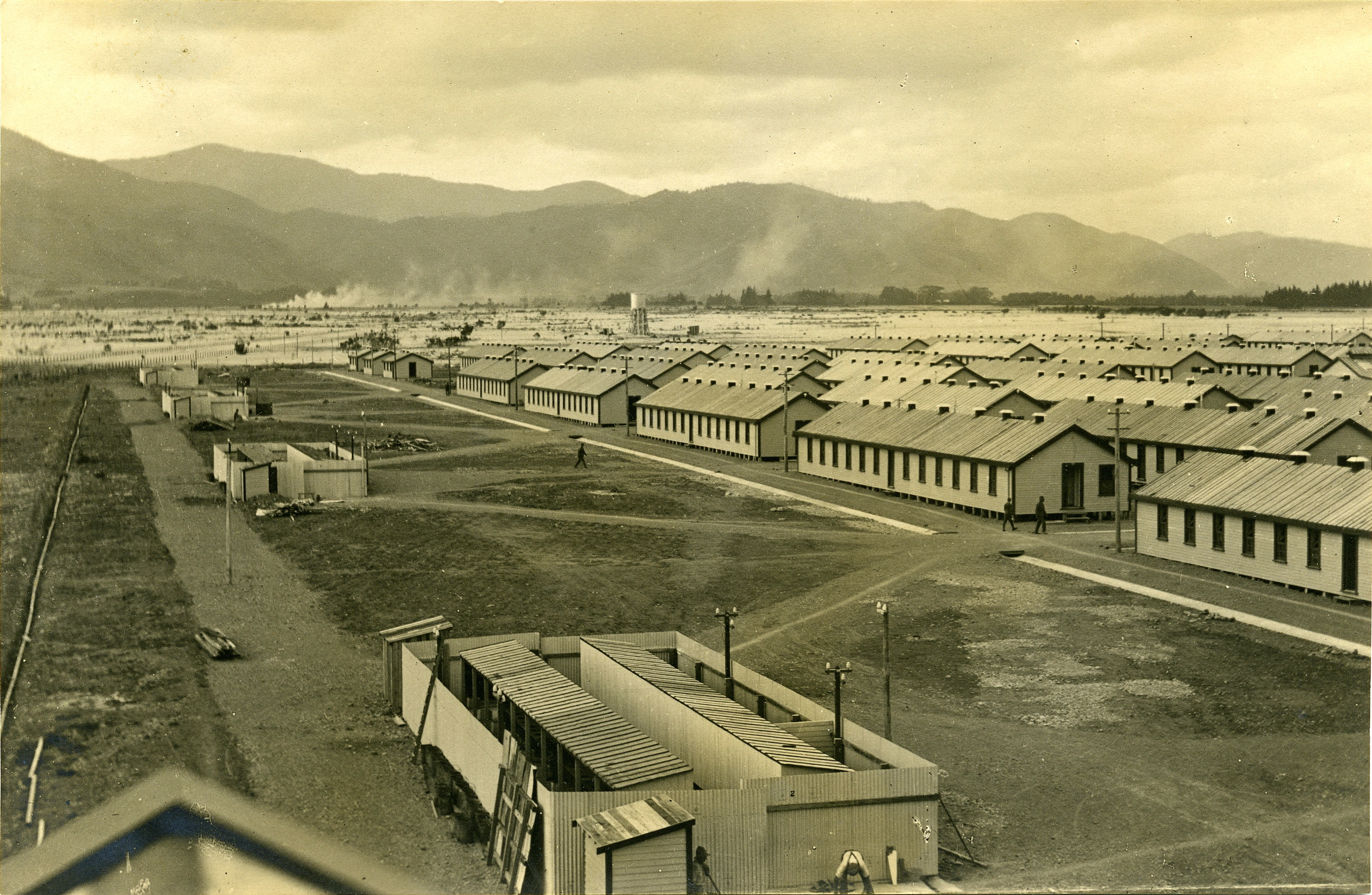
Featherston Camp (1916) Around the time Kirwan was based there

Kirwan managed to play some rugby while serving. He played for the South Island New Zealand Forces Army team against the North Island on 4 May 1919 in a match his side won 10–6. Kirwan was stationed in Western Europe, predominantly France serving in the New Zealand Field Artillery. In December 1918 he was promoted to Bombardier.

Tragedy struck Kirwan and his family in early January 1919 when his sister Anastasia died after contracting influenza during the tail end of the 1918 pandemic. She had been caring for the sick during this time and was aged just 24.

Kirwan was promoted again to corporal on 15 January after fighting in the war had ceased. While the New Zealand troops remained in Europe, Kirwan played rugby games for some of the NZ army teams which travelled around playing matches. One such match was played for the New Zealand Army team stationed at Sutton against the New Zealanders from Brocton in early April and he scored a try in a 22–0 win.

On 16 November 1919 he boarded the Arawa to return to New Zealand, arriving home on 16 December 1919. He was then discharged having served for 3 years and 174 days in total including 2 years and 321 days overseas.

Kirwan received the British War Medal and the Victory Medal.

== Playing career ==
=== Move to Dannevirke and Hawke's Bay rugby side ===
After being discharged Kirwan went immediately to Dannevirke where he resumed his career working in the Post Office as a telegraphist. He played for the Dannevirke Old Boys rugby club throughout the 3 years he was to spend there. He was selected to play for Southern Hawke's Bay against Northern Hawke's Bay on 10 July. In a description of the match Kirwan was said to be a “prominent member of the backs” in a match his side lost 6–0 before being selected to make his Hawke's Bay debut against Taranaki. The match was played on 22 July 1920 in New Plymouth with Hawke's Bay winning 8–6.

In 1921, Kirwan played further matches for Hawke's Bay against Wairarapa on 2 July and Manawatu on 6 July. He was then selected in the combined Hawke's Bay-Poverty Bay team to play against the touring South African international side. The match was a hard-fought one on 3 September at McLean Park in Napier before a crowd of 7,500. Kirwan played in the centres in a 14–8 loss.

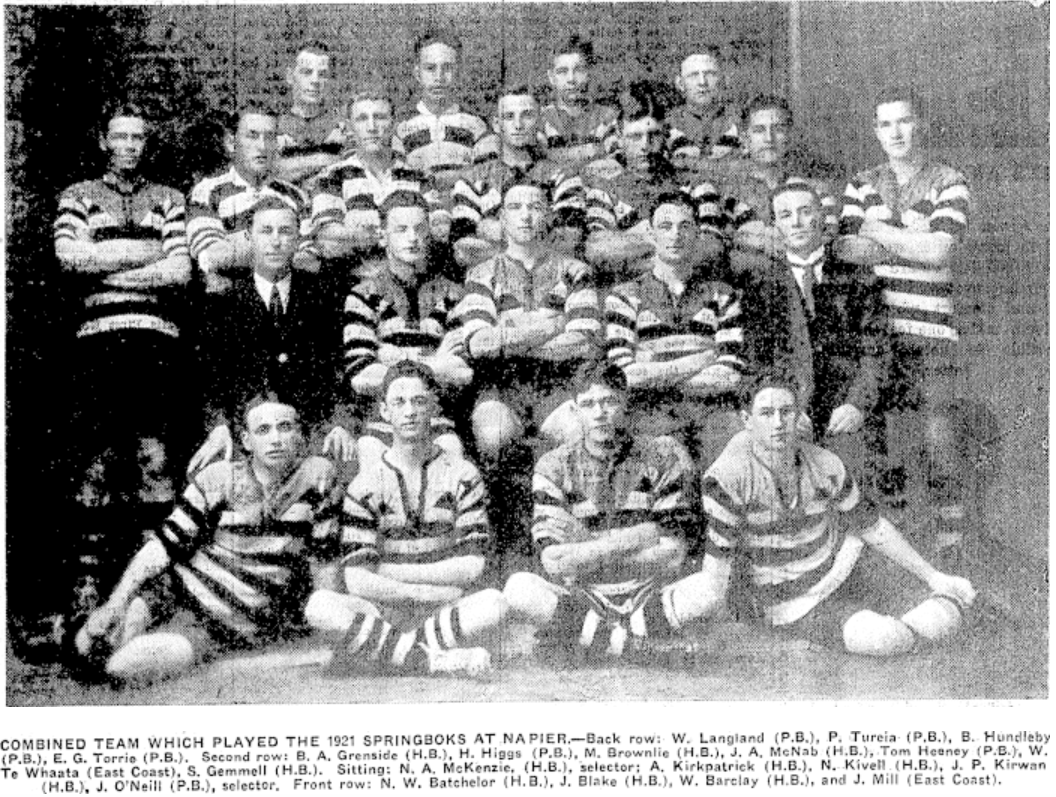
The Poverty Bay/Hawkes Bay combined team that played South Africa in 1921. Kirwan is seated 2nd from the right.

Playing alongside Kirwan was Bill Te Whata who would also like Kirwan switch to rugby league and represent New Zealand.

In 1922, Kirwan played 7 matches for the Hawke's Bay side. The first was against Wairarapa which was won 17–3. Kirwan then appeared in their famous 19–9 Ranfurly Shield win over Wellington on 10 August. Kirwan scored 2 tries in the win. He was selected for the Hawke's Bay southern tour which involved matches against Otago, Southland, and Canterbury. They lost to Otago 11–8 at Carisbrook before a crowd of 11,000 though the Ranfurly Shield was not on the line for any of these matches. Hawke's Bay lost again 11–3 to Southland with 4,000 spectators looking on in Invercargill. Before finishing the tour with a 29–3 win over Canterbury. He finished the representative season off with a defence of the Ranfurly Shield against Bay of Plenty at Nelson Park in Hastings which they won narrowly 17–16. This was followed by another defence against King Country at McLean Park, Napier. In front of a crowd of 4,000 they won easily 42–8 with Kirwan scoring a try.

In 1924 Kirwan played in a 6–0 loss to Wairarapa on 21 July, and then a 10–6 win over Wellington in their second shield defence of the season at McLean Park in Napier before a crowd of 6,000. Kirwan was playing in the three-quarters outside George Nēpia who was five eighth along with Lui Paewai. Kirwan then missed a Southern Hawke's Bay match with Manawatu and a Hawke's Bay match with Poverty Bay as he was battling the flu before being selected to play against the touring New South Wales side. The team Kirwan was in was a combined East Coast-Poverty Bay-Hawke's Bay side and they won comfortably by 32 points to 15.

Kirwan then finished his season by playing in the Ranfurly Shield defences over Horowhenua on 8 September which they won 38–11, and over Auckland which was won 20–5. The match with Auckland was played in front of a huge crowd of 10,000 and Kirwan was heavily involved in several attacking raids. It was Hawke's Bay's last shield defence of the year. Two weeks later Kirwan travelled with the Hawke's Bay team to Auckland to play a return match at the Auckland Domain. The crowd numbered 22,000. Auckland reversed the earlier result winning by 17 to 9 in a match which raised £1000 for the construction of the nearby Auckland War Memorial Museum which had construction on it begin in 1929.

Following the conclusion of the season Kirwan was transferred from the Dannevirke Post Office to the Auckland Chief Post Office located at the present day Britomart in the Auckland CBD.

=== Move to Auckland, Marist Old Boys rugby and Auckland debuts ===
Kirwan joined the Marist Brothers Old Boys rugby club who played in the Auckland Rugby Union competition. He debuted for them on 26 April in a match with College Rifles which his side won 6–3. He was then selected in the Auckland Provincial team to play his former Hawke's Bay side. The match acting as a trial for the All Blacks side. The match was played at Eden Park before a crowd of 12,000. Kirwan set up the Auckland Province side's first try with a reverse pass to Bert Cooke who scored under the posts. He did the same later in the match, reversing a pass back to Bill Wright who scored to make the score 15–6 with his team going on to win 18–9. Kirwan then gained a place in the North Islands Probables v Possibles match which was played in Wellington on 21 May.

The rest of the first half of Kirwan's season was spent playing for his Marist side in the local club competition. In total he played 7 matches for them and scored 2 tries and games against Grafton and College Rifles. On 23 July he went back to his family in Reefton due to “family affairs” and after he returned he played in 7 matches for the Auckland representative side through August and September. They were against Waikato (9–5), North Auckland (11–8), Hawke's Bay (6–23), Wairarapa (18–15), Wellington (9–8), Wanganui (8–10), and Taranaki (17–12). The match against Hawke's Bay was a Ranfurly Shield challenge with Kirwan kicking a drop goal on his old ‘home field’ of McLean Park, Napier.

Kirwan was reportedly unhappy with the lack of compensation provided for players in the representative team who often had to take time off work to play thus resulting in a loss in wages. This is cited at one of the main reasons Kirwan then transferred to the rugby league code which was much more proactive in compensating its players for any loss in wages through playing the game.

=== Switch to Rugby League ===
In mid to late September Kirwan switched codes and joined the Marist Old Boys rugby league team. He made his debut for Marist in the championship final against Devonport United. The move caused some controversy with a The New Zealand Herald article stating that "his inclusion was the source of a good deal of comment, and it is thought by many that, in the circumstances, the fact that he took part in a game with a direct bearing on the championship, was not according to the ethics of true sportsmanship."

Kirwan scored a try in a 20–17 win on Carlaw Park in front of an enormous crowd of 17,000 which was a club record for Auckland Rugby League at that time. It was said that Kirwan's "presence was probably the deciding factor in giving Marist their narrow win." His try helped give Marist a 10–7 lead after he received a pass from Lyall Stewart and scored in the corner.

The Auckland Star further discussed the controversy saying "the sole topic of conversation in … both League and Rugby since Saturday last has been the playing of Kirwan in the Marist Bros. team, and while the majority of followers hold the opinion that it was hardly the fair thing that Kirwan should be played…, others again hold that the Tykes were not only entitled to do so, but did what any other team would have done had they been similarly placed…" The club freely admitting "that for some time they had been endeavouring to get Kirwan to come over to League." Devonport were also trying to secure rugby players to join their side including Tonkin, Matson (Ponsonby) and Neil Ifwerson (Grammar).

Kirwan played two more matches for Marist before the season end. A loss to Devonport in the Roope Rooster competition and a 10–10 drawn match with City Rovers as part of the Labour Day celebrations.

In 1925, Kirwan appeared in nine matches for Marist Old Boys scoring 5 tries. The Marist season was over shadowed by the death of Bill Stormont who died after battling rheumatic heart disease. At the end of the season Marist played for the newly created Stormont Shield to memorialise Stormont which is still played for today. Kirwan scored a try but it could not prevent a Marist lost 23–22 to Ponsonby United.

In June Kirwan was selected to play for the North Island team against the South Island. North Island won 27–9 and following the match, which was part of a series of trials at Carlaw Park on the same day, Kirwan was selected in the New Zealand side to tour Australia. He was chosen in the three quarters along with Lou Brown, Hec Brisbane, Frank Delgrosso, and Jim Parkes.

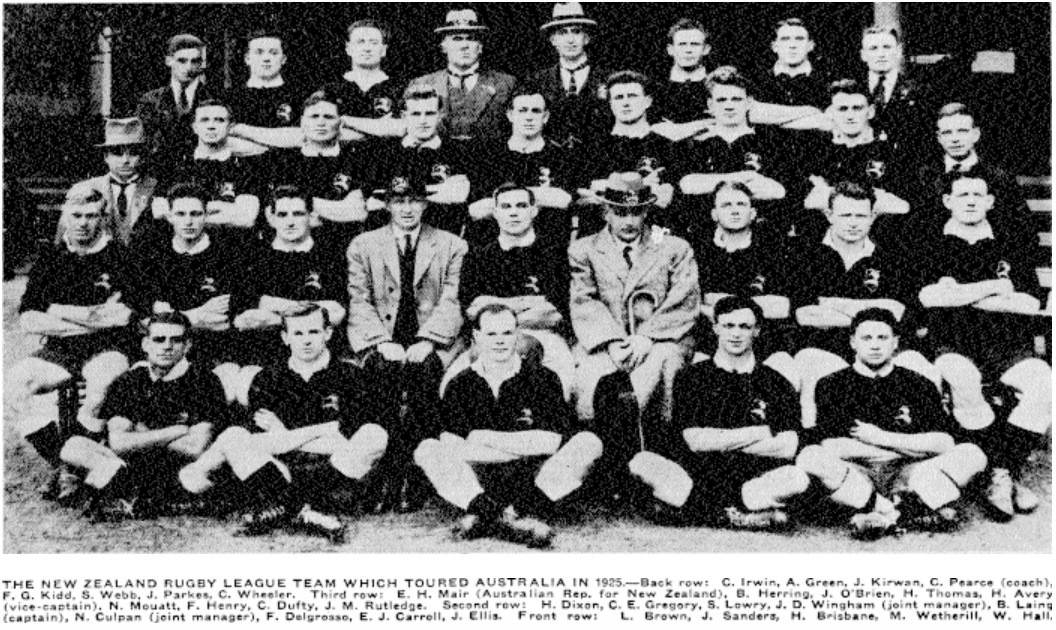
New Zealand team to tour Australia in 1925. Jack Kirwan is 3rd from the left in the back row.

New Zealand played 12 matches on the tour with Kirwan playing in 7 of them. He was part of the side which lost to New South Wales 4–7 at the Sydney Cricket Ground in front of 24,000 spectators. He was on the losing side again when New Zealand went down to an Australian Universities XIII 13–15. Kirwan scored a try in a 31–20 win over the Far North Coast side in Lismore before playing in the 20–29 loss to Queensland in Brisbane before a crowd of 10,000. His other three matches were in a 14–16 loss to Toowoomba, an historic 19–18 win over New South Wales, and a 25–26 loss to a Southern Division side in Cootamundra where he scored two tries. The match with New South Wales was before a crowd of 15,000 at the Sydney Cricket Ground who saw Kirwan make a break and sent Jim Parkes in for a try which gave New Zealand the lead. Kirwan arrived back in New Zealand on 25 August on board the Moeraki and 4 days later played for New Zealand against Auckland. New Zealand won before 15,000 by 41 to 17 at Carlaw Park.

The Queensland side that New Zealand had met on tour had arrived in New Zealand to play 11 matches of their own. Kirwan played against them for New Zealand at Carlaw Park on 5 September with New Zealand winning 25–24. On 9 September he wore an Auckland jersey against the tourists. This was his first ever appearance for the Auckland league representative side and the match was drawn 18–18. He again played Queensland for New Zealand but this time they were well beaten 35–14. Kirwan crossed for a try after making a break, kicking ahead, and winning the race to the ball. He was later awarded an “obstruction try” after Craig tackled a player without the ball after a break had been made a certain try would have been scored.

In 1926 Kirwan played 8 matches for Marist scoring 5 tries though the key focus for the representative players this year was in gaining selection for the New Zealand tour to England. Kirwan played in a match for Auckland against South Auckland on 26 June which Auckland won easily 49–15. He was then chosen for the North Island team to play the South Island a week later on 3 July. Kirwan scored a try after bursting straight through to score under the posts and give the North a 16–9 lead. He threw the final pass for Ben Davidson to score and he did the same for Bert Avery. He then played for the New Zealand Probables against the New Zealand Possibles with his side losing 15–32 though the Herald noted that he “was the soundest of the inside backs”.

=== 1926–27 New Zealand tour of England ===
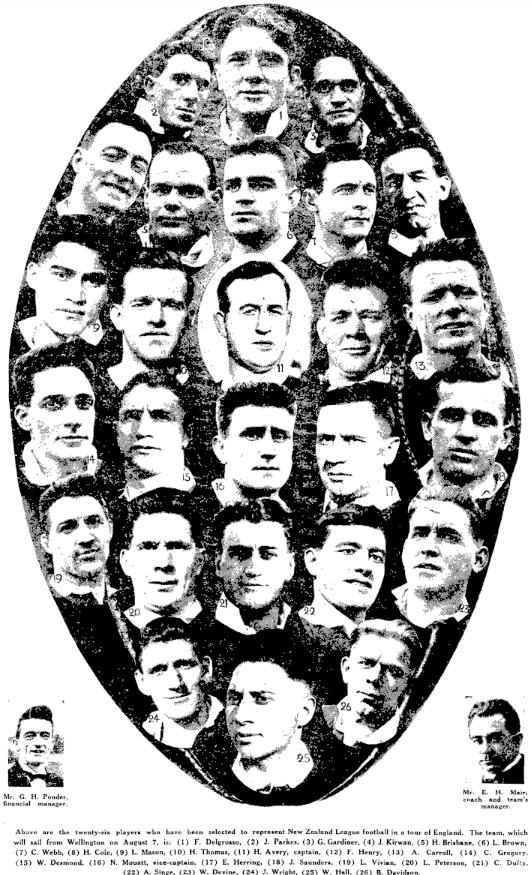
The NZ team to tour England and Wales with Jack Kirwan, second row from the top on the left.

Kirwan was named in the New Zealand team to tour England though there was an issue with him securing leave for the tour. This was eventually resolved however and he departed with the team on 3 August on board the Aorangi. The tour stopped off in Fiji where during a training session Kirwan lost a large amount of skin from his wrist and elbow on the dirt fields there which was requiring daily treatment to heal. Unfortunately for Kirwan and the New Zealand team the tour was plagued by issues between management and players throughout. A group of 7 forwards went on strike during the tour over issues regarding their treatment off the field, selection issues, and a poor relationship with coach Ernest Mair.

New Zealand played 34 matches in total with Kirwan playing in 18 of them. He played in the tour opener against Dewsbury which was a 13–9 win on 11 September in front of 16,000, before appearing again against Halifax 7 days later with New Zealand losing 13–19. He was not selected for the next four matches before playing against York on 9 October. Kirwan scored a try in a 19–11 win but he injured a muscle and was out for 4 weeks and 7 matches while he recovered. The selectors decided to rest captain Bert Avery and chose Kirwan to lead the side in their match with Salford on 3 November. New Zealand won the match by 18 to 10.

Kirwan scored a try in an 8–10 loss against Huddersfield on 6 November before being selected to play in the centres against England in the second test at Hull. Kirwan was said to have played well though New Zealand went down 21 to 11 meaning they had lost the series after losing the first test earlier. He played in games with Wigan Highfield and Batley won 14–2 and lost 17–19 respectively. His next appearance was off the bench in the test with Wales on 4 December at Pontypridd. New Zealand was soundly beaten by 34 points to 8. Kirwan was part of the side which went down 12–22 to St Helens before a big 36–15 win over Wigan though Kirwan had to leave the field injured. He had earlier switched to the fullback position after Charles Gregory was injured and Kirwan's own injury occurred when he was tackling Sullivan as he scored. He was badly cut over the right eye and was “bleeding profusely” having to leave the field to receive 3 stitches.

He missed the next two matches but with a large number of New Zealand's players on strike or injured by this point of the tour he was again selected to play against Pontypridd on Christmas Day. The tour was 27 matches and 14 weeks old prior to the Pontypridd match and he was to play in the final 6 matches of the tour including the 3rd and final test against England on 15 January in Leeds. New Zealand lost 17–32 in wet conditions in front of 8,000 spectators. The tour was now at an end and the team returned to New Zealand, arriving in Auckland on 1 March 1927.

=== Return to Marist and Auckland ===
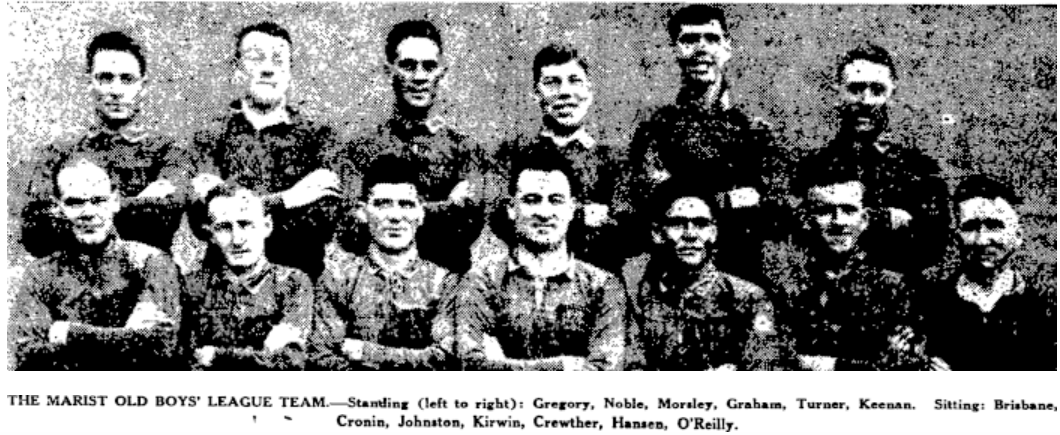
Marist in 1927.

Less than a month after arriving home from a rugby league season which had effectively lasted 9 months Kirwan was picked to play in a New Zealand team composed of the Auckland members of the touring side minus Kirwan's Marist teammate Arthur Singe who had been banned for life for his role in the strike on tour. Kirwan's side was to play against the local Auckland team at Carlaw Park and before a large crowd of 14,000 the ‘New Zealand’ side lost 21–24. By now Kirwan was aged 32 and the match against Auckland was to be the last representative match of his career.

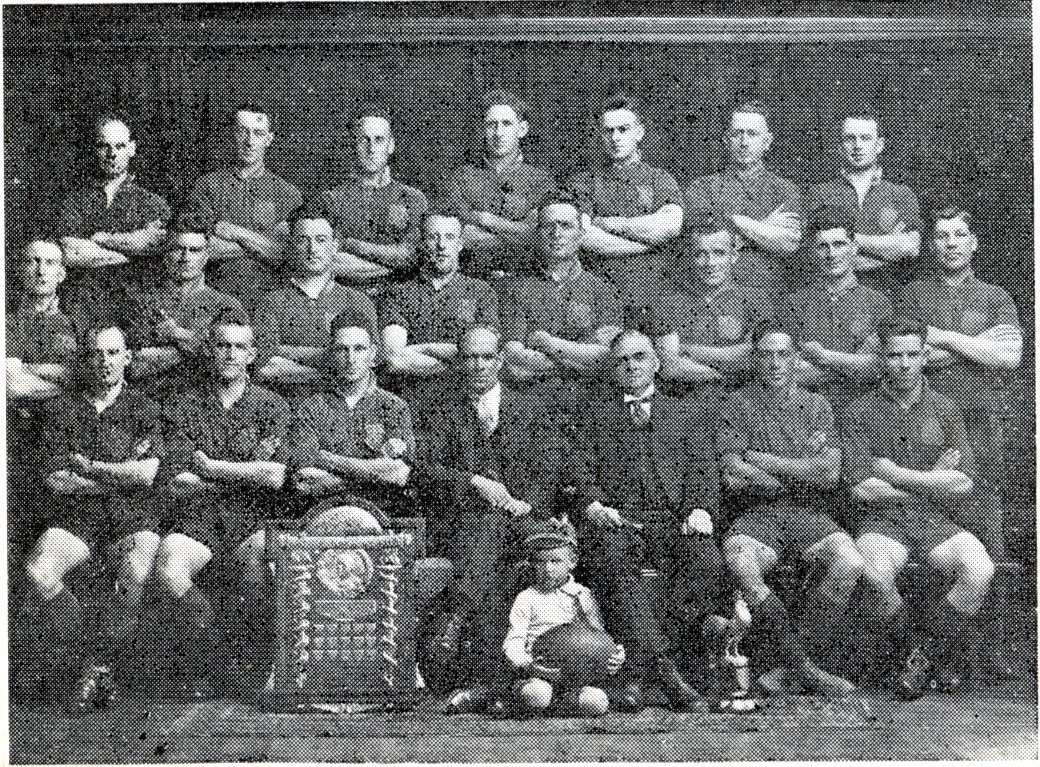
The Marist team of 1928 who won the Roope Rooster, Stormont Shield and Labour Day Cup. Jack Kirwan is third from the left in the middle row

He played 12 games for Marist in the 1927 season. In March 1928 at the Marist annual general meeting he was elected auditor and assistant secretary for the club. He had retired from the playing field and said “I think we have done our bit… and the aim of the club now is to give the most promising of the juniors a chance.” At a dinner for the touring England team on 4 August Kirwan was presented with a medallion for being a “loyalist” on the 1927–27 tour of England. Weeks later Kirwan decided to pull on the green and gold Marist jersey once again and he played in a match against City Rovers which Marist won 14–10. He then played in Marist's successful Roope Rooster campaign where they beat Richmond Rovers 14–9, Devonport United 10–5, and Ponsonby United to claim the title. He then played 4 further matches in the Labour Day competition which stretched over two weekends. Marist won all 4 matches over Huntly, Ellerslie, City Rovers, and Richmond Rovers to win the tournament. He now permanently retired from playing.

== Rugby league retirement ==
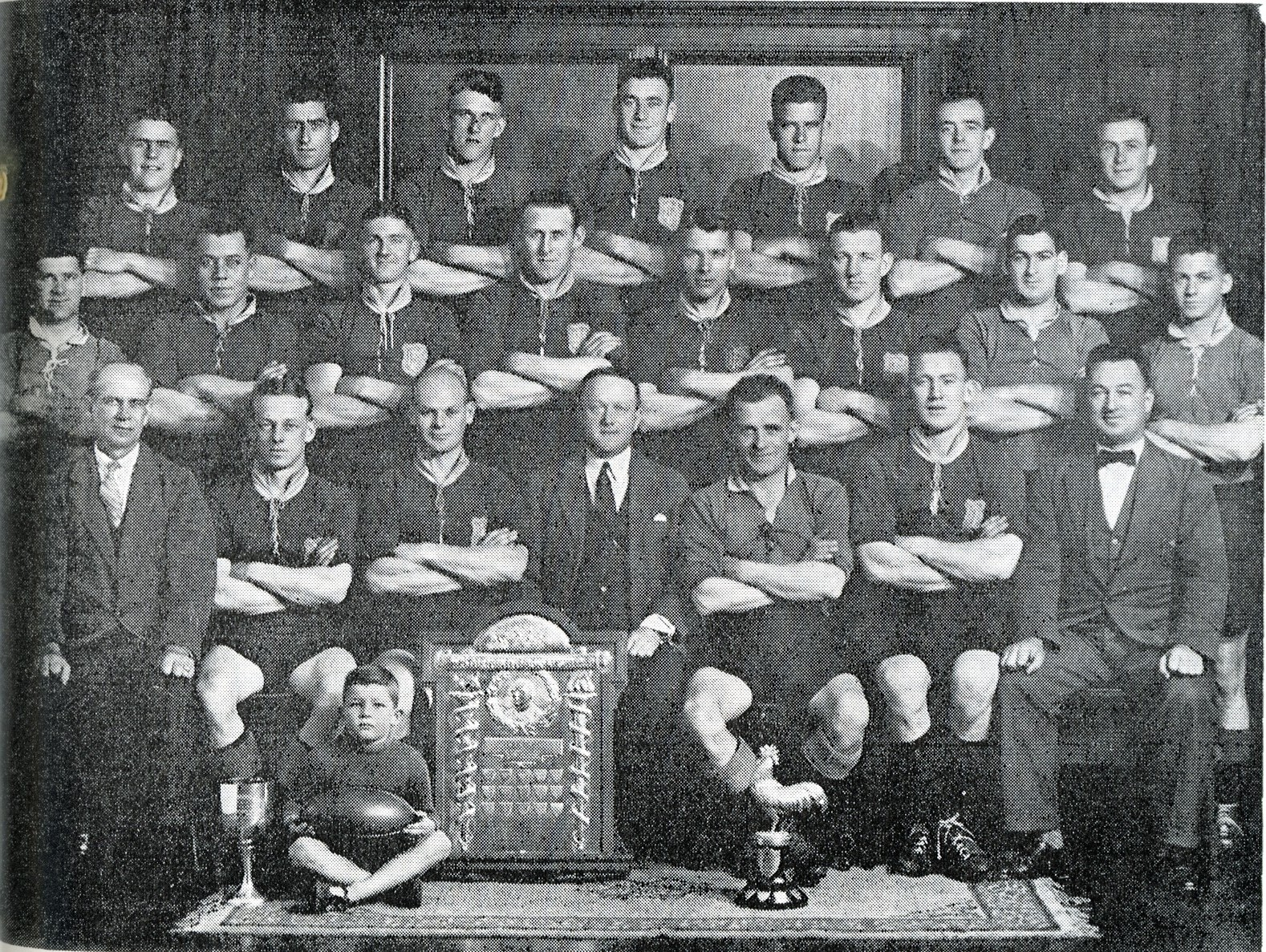
The 1932 Marist team who won the Roope Rooster and Stormont Shield with coach Jack Kirwan seated front right and his son Patrick who was the team mascot on the floor

At the end of the 1928 season Kirwan permanently hung up his boots. He was elected to the Marist board throughout the 1930s and 40s in the secretary and honorary secretary position. In 1932 he coached the side to the Stormont Shield and Roope Rooster. In 1945 he was chosen to be an Auckland representative selector along with Jim Clark and Dougie McGregor.

== Personal life ==
Kirwan was a Roman Catholic. He married Morven McDonald Fergus on 10 October 1925. Jack Kirwan died aged 72 on 20 October 1968. His next of kin was his son, Patrick Kirwan, of Māngere.

Jack Kirwan's grandson, John Kirwan, played 142 times for the Auckland rugby team and 63 times for the All Blacks before switching to rugby league in the mid-1990s. He then played for the New Zealand Warriors 35 times and later returned to the rugby code coaching Italy, Japan, and the Blues team in the Super Rugby competition.
