= William Devine =

William Devine may refer to:

- Bill Devine (1893–1956), New Zealand rugby union and rugby league footballer
- Jack Devine (ice hockey) (William John Devine; 1919–1989), Canadian ice hockey administrator and radio personality
- Mickey Devine (baseball player) (William Patrick Devine; 1892–1937), American professional baseball player

== See also ==
- William Devin (disambiguation)
- William Devane
