= Charles Gregory (rugby) =

New Zealand international rugby league player (1901–1988)

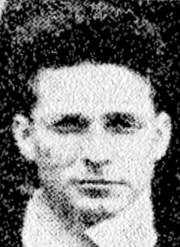

Personal information
- Full name: Charles Edward Gregory
- Born: 2 July 1901 Wellington, New Zealand
- Died: 12 October 1988 (aged 87) Auckland, New Zealand

Playing information
- Height: 170 cm (5 ft 7 in)
- Weight: 72 kg (11 st 5 lb)

Rugby league
- Position: Fullback, Centre, Stand-off
Club
Years	Team	Pld	T	G	FG	P
1921	Newton Rangers	1	0	0	0	0
1924–31	Marist Old Boys	88	13	129	0	297
	Total	89	13	129	0	297
Representative
Years	Team	Pld	T	G	FG	P
1924–29	Auckland	10	3	2	0	11
1925–30	New Zealand	40 (3)	2	18 (1)	0	42 (2)
1927	New Zealand XIII	1	0	0	0	0
1927–29	North Island	2	0	1	0	2

Rugby union
- Position: Fullback
Club
Years	Team	Pld	T	G	FG	P
1922–24	Ponsonby	24	4	21	0	58
Representative
Years	Team	Pld	T	G	FG	P
1922–23	Auckland	12	0	2	0	4
1923	Auckland Province	1	0	0	0	0

Coaching information
Representative
Years	Team	Gms	W	D	L	W%
1934–35	Marist Old Boys	33	9	3	21	27
1936	Ellerslie (3rd grade)	14	11	1	2	79
- As of 25 February 2024

Charles Gregory (2 July 1901 – 12 October 1988) was a rugby league player who represented New Zealand in 40 matches including 3 tests from 1925 to 1930. When he debuted for New Zealand in 1925 he became Kiwi number 171. He predominantly played fullback during his career though he played standoff and centre at various points. He also represented Auckland in both rugby league and rugby union and played for the Ponsonby rugby club and the Marist rugby league club.

== Early life ==
Charles Edward Gregory was born on 2 July 1901. He was the son of mother Johanna Drysdale Gregory, and father William John Gregory. He had four older brothers, Thomas (1891-1975), William James (1895-1977), Frederick Arthur (1898-1979), and George Robert (1896-1963), and a younger brother Albert John (1904-1983). He also had three older sisters, Annie (1887-1924), Mary Elizabeth (1889-1979), and Rose (1893-1942).

== Playing career ==
=== School rugby ===
Gregory attended Mount Albert Grammar School and played rugby for the school.

=== Newton Rangers rugby league ===
In 1921 Gregory was playing for the Newton Rangers club which was representative of the inner city suburb of the same name. He spent most of the season in the second grade team which won the championship and is in the back row of their end of season photograph. It appears that his brother Frederick was playing for the senior side on occasion and had debuted for them in 1919, continuing to play for them until around 1923.

=== Rugby union, Ponsonby and Auckland ===
He began playing rugby for the Ponsonby club in Auckland. Gregory played for the 2nd grade team from 1919 to 1921. During the 1921 season he was selected in the Auckland junior representative team to play Thames juniors in the five-eighths position. The match was played at Eden Park with Gregory kicking a conversion in a 26–0 win. He then played for them in a 10–6 win against the Manukau sub-union senior representative side as curtain-raiser to the Auckland-Wellington match. His last game for them was against Whangarei B in Whangārei with Auckland winning 25–3.

In 1922 he began the season in the Ponsonby juniors for the first round but was then promoted to the first grade side for their 6 May match with Grafton. They won 11–3 on the number 1 field at Eden Park. His first points for them were in a 31–3 win in front of 4,000 spectators. He kicked 5 conversions and a penalty. He then scored 2 tries and kicked 2 goals in a 17–8 win over North Shore. In July Gregory was selected to play for Auckland B against Thames Valley in Paeroa. Auckland B won 18–3 with Gregory playing in the halves. Then on 28 July he made his full Auckland debut in an 8–6 win over North Auckland at Kensington Park, Whangārei. Gregory kicked a conversion which were the points which ultimately won the match. He was later selected to go on the Auckland 'southern tour' but was expected to join the team with reinforcements when they arrived at Wellington but he did not make the trip. Gregory finished the season having played 11 times for Ponsonby. His final rugby match was in their 7 a-side team which beat Eden in the tournament final 20–0 with Gregory kicking 4 conversions. The match was played at Avondale Racecourse as part of a full day of 7 a-side games across several grades.

In 1923 he again pulled on the Ponsonby jersey playing 12 games for their first grade side and kicking 13 goals for them. After 2 rounds there was discussion of who would replace Stuart Findlay at fullback for Auckland as he was not going to play in 1923. It was said of Gregory that he was "easily the best custodian that has been seen on the main ground Eden Park so far". "He has gained a deal in weight and confidence since last season, and if he keeps up the form shown on Saturday he should be in the running".

Gregory did indeed gain selection for Auckland and he was their regular fullback throughout the representative season. His first match was against Southland and he was forced from the field with an injury early in the first half in an easy 37–3 win at Eden Park on 4 August. He dived in to stop an attack and received a head injury. He recovered in time to play fullback again against Taranaki in a 30–9 win in front of 12,000 spectators at Eden Park. On 18 August at the same venue he had little to do defensively in a 58–0 win over Wanganui. A win over Northland 33-6 followed. He was again safe at fullback for Auckland's 16–5 win over Otago in front of the largest crowd of the season at Eden Park of 13,000. A feature of his play had been his positional play, solid defense, and good return kicking which became a hallmark of his career.

Gregory's next representative match was for the Auckland Provincial team made up of players from the larger Auckland region with the opponents the touring New South Wales team. The match was played in front of 15,000 spectators at Eden Park on 8 September. Auckland won 27 to 11 with Gregory heavily involved. He then played for his Auckland side in a 21–15 win over Wellington, once again at Eden Park. Auckland's most significant match of the season was next for Gregory. They travelled to McLean Park in Napier to take on Hawke's Bay for the Ranfurly Shield. With 10,000 in attendance the Hawke's Bay side retained the shield with a 20–5 win. After Sheen was injured Gregory moved into the five-eighth position, James Molloy replacing him at fullback. Gregory and Karl Ifwersen were said to be defending George Nēpia and Lui Paewai "especially well" before he was later moved back to fullback. It was later said that he was a disappointment at fullback. His final game in an Auckland rugby jersey came in a match against King Country at Taumarunui which Auckland won 18–9. He was named in the reserves to play against Hawke's Bay in their 'return match' at Eden Park but he did not take the field with Malloy being preferred in the fullback position, and so his playing season came to an end.

=== Switch to rugby league, Marist Old Boys (Saints) and Auckland debuts ===
Gregory began the 1924 season playing for Ponsonby once again, however his only appearance was in their first round match against University. They won 6–0 with Gregory kicking 2 penalty goals. He then applied for permission to play rugby league and at the Auckland Rugby League management committee meeting on 8 May he was granted reinstatement to the Marist Old Boys club. His debut was against the Ponsonby rugby league side in a 10–3 win at Carlaw Park in front of 3,000 spectators with Gregory converting both Marist tries. The New Zealand Herald reported that "a smoother display of fullback play than that given by Gregory has not often been seen on Carlaw Park". The following week their match was postponed and then Gregory was selected in the Auckland training squad to prepare for a match against the touring Australian Universities side. He ultimately did not make the playing XIII. Gregory then played in 2 more Marist wins over Richmond Rovers and Athletic respectively before being chosen in the 'Auckland' Possible trial side which played the probables as a curtain-raiser to the Auckland v Australian Universities 3rd match on 14 June. Gregory played in his regular fullback position and kicked a conversion in a 14–9 win to the Possibles.

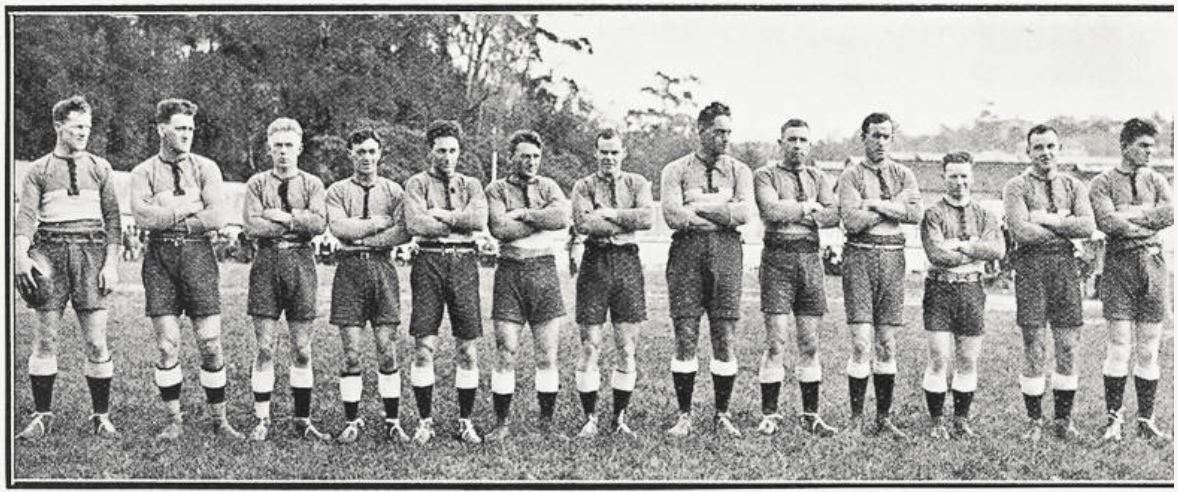
Gregory 5th from the left in the Auckland team to play England on 26 July 1924

He played 4 more matches for Marist who were thrashing most opponents and on their way to their first ever first grade title. These games were punctuated by an appearance for Auckland B against Hamilton on 16 July. He kicked 2 conversions in a 28–18 win at Carlaw Park. Then following another win for Marist over City Rovers Gregory was selected for Auckland to play against the touring England. Auckland went down 11–24 in front of an enormous crowd of 20,000 at Carlaw Park. It was said of Gregory that he "did fairly well, but was bustled at times by the opposing forwards". That was Gregory's final representative match of the season though he played 8 further matches for Marist including the championship final with Devonport United which Marist won 20–17 in front of a club record crowd of 17,000. Gregory kicked 3 conversions and a penalty in the victory.

=== New Zealand selection and debut ===
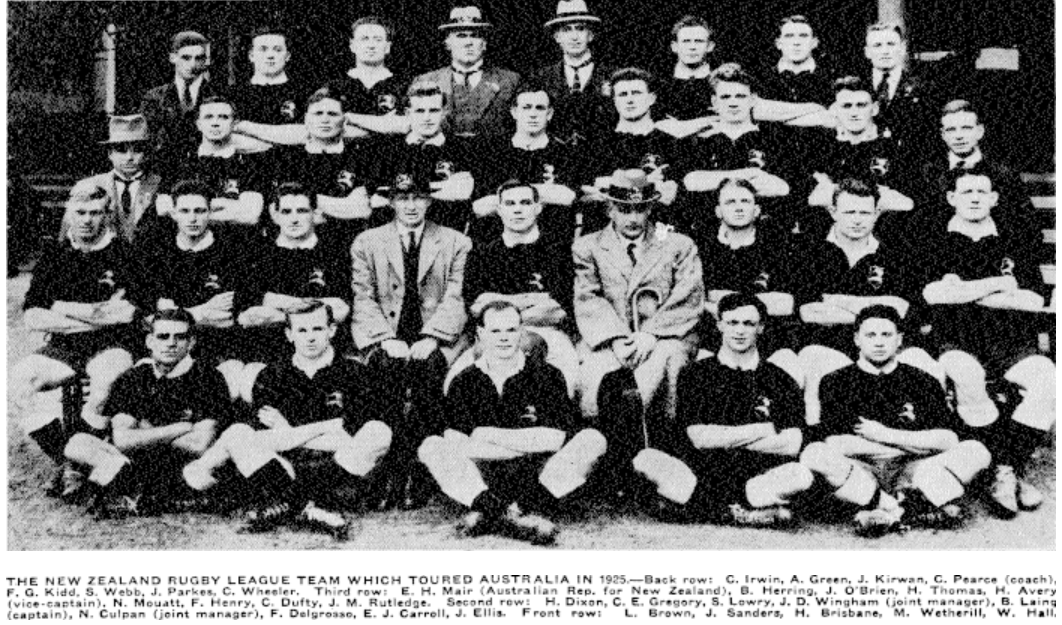

The 1925 season saw Gregory make his New Zealand debut when he was selected to go on the New Zealand tour of Australia. He had played 7 matches for Marist kicking 15 goals prior to selection. Tragedy marred the Marist campaign however with Gregory's teammate Bill Stormont succumbing to Rheumatic heart disease on 4 June with Marist's match 2 days later being cancelled. Gregory was selected to play in an Auckland trial match on 27 June which his "A Team" lost 0–5. He was described multiple times in a match report as being as usual 'safe' in the fullback position. He was then picked for the tour and made his debut prior to their departure in a match against Auckland. He played fullback in a 16–9 win in a sea of mud at Carlaw Park but still managed to give a "fine display". His selection was as part of a 22-man squad which departed aboard the Moeraki to Sydney on 3 July. He was chosen as one of two fullbacks alongside New Zealand incumbent Craddock Dufty. He was joined in the squad by Marist teammates Hec Brisbane, Jack Kirwan, and Jim O'Brien.

Gregory was omitted from the first two matches of the tour and made his first appearance against Newcastle on 18 July. New Zealand won 29–11 before 8,000 spectators at Newcastle Sports Ground with Gregory at fullback, with Dufty playing in the centres. He then played in the 5th match of the tour against New South Wales on 25 July at the Newcastle Sports Ground again. A crowd of 13,000 saw New Zealand with an upset 17–10 win. Gregory was mentioned for his defence during the match saving New Zealand on several occasions with his tackling and kicking. He was in the reserves for the match with Queensland but came on through injury early in the match with Jim Parkes leaving the field. New Zealand went down heavily 43–19 at the Exhibition Oval in Queensland though Gregory along with Wilson Hall and Maurice Wetherill were named as the "outstanding New Zealand players" with Gregory playing a "brilliant game" before a crowd of 28,000. He was fullback again in a 21–22 loss to Ipswich at the North Ipswich Reserve on 5 August. The tour was not going well from a results point of view with Gregory again involved in the 5th loss of the tour in match 9 against the Queensland team. New Zealand going down 20–29. He was then in the side which was defeated by Toowoomba 14–16 at the Athletic Oval there on 12 August before a crowd of 4,500. This time however he was playing in the centres with Dufty at fullback. In what was overall a disappointing tour New Zealand recorded their most impressive win over New South Wales 19–18 at the Sydney Cricket Ground before 16,000 spectators on 15 August. The final match of the tour which Gregory was again at fullback saw New Zealand on the losing side 25–26 to a Southern Division side at Cootamundra. The game was marked by the local team receiving 28 free kicks to New Zealand's 3 with the New Zealand side expressing "strong dissatisfaction with the referee's rulings".

After their return the New Zealand side played Auckland at Carlaw Park and thrashed them 41–17. Gregory was heavily involved both defensively and on attack. A week later they met the Queensland side which was touring New Zealand. A crowd of 18,000 people were on hand to see New Zealand win 25–24 with a large second half comeback after trailing 19–5 at halftime. Four days later he was again at fullback for Auckland's 18–18 draw against the same opponents. He gave a "sound display" stopping several Queensland attacks. Gregory was then part of the New Zealand team who played Queensland once again but this time they were badly defeated 14–35. Gregory was busy at fullback though and was said to be "sound" though "overshadowed by Jim Craig, the Queensland fullback".

To this point in the season Gregory had played 21 matches which was an abnormally large amount for a New Zealand rugby league player in this era, however he was not finished yet. On 19 September he represented Auckland in a match with South Auckland (Waikato) which Auckland won 36–19 and thus retained the Northern Union Cup. He then played in the Stormont Shield semi-final which was a trophy played for in honour of his teammate who had died earlier in the year, Bill Stormont. Marist lost 22–23 to Ponsonby though Gregory scored a rare try and kicked 5 goals for a 13-point haul. Then in the final match of the Auckland season he kicked 2 conversions in a 16–26 loss to Ponsonby as part of the Labour Day carnival.

=== New Zealand tour of England ===
1926 was again to be an incredibly busy year for Charles Gregory where he played in 28 matches. He played 6 games for Marist before being selected in the reserves for the Auckland team to play South Auckland (Waikato) on 26 June. However the match which was being played as a trial match for the New Zealand team was so lopsided that at halftime when Auckland led 33–3, six of the Auckland players, including Gregory took the field for the South Auckland side. They ultimately won 49–15. Gregory then played in a trial for the A Team which his side lost 16–25, before a match for Auckland against ‘the rest’ which Auckland lost 21–28. His final trial match was for New Zealand Possibles versus New Zealand Probables, though with 26 players being taken on the tour of England his place was reasonably assured. His possibles side ran out 32-15 winners. The New Zealand Herald reporter wrote that Gregory "played a particularly sound game … and has seldom given a better exhibition". Gregory was then named in the New Zealand side for the historic tour of England. He played 2 further club matches for Marist before departing New Zealand shores on 3 August aboard the R.M.M.S Aorangi. It was said that several members of the New Zealand team suffered "severely from sea-sickness on the trip across the Pacific [and] that C. Gregory was one of the worst cases". It was so bad in fact that when the team stopped off in Suva, Fiji and played a practice game he along with Ernie Herring were absent due the effects of their sea sickness.

Gregory's first match of the tour was in the 4th game against Rochdale Hornets on 23 September at Athletic Grounds, Rochdale. New Zealand recorded a narrow 11–9 win after a late comeback with Gregory at fullback. He then played in the next match against Widnes which saw New Zealand win 15–5 in front of 6,000 spectators. His third match was in the first test against England at Wigan before 14,550 spectators. New Zealand was defeated 20–28 although Gregory was said to have "played a grand game at fullback". He was again a standout in New Zealand's 19–11 win over York in their next match, said to be among the "best of the visitors" along with Stan Webb, Bert Avery, and Henry. He was again at fullback 3 days later for the 5–17 loss to Warrington in rain and a heavy gale. He was said to be New Zealand's best player in the match though the team was criticised as being "third rate" by the Daily News in England. Gregory scored his first points of the tour when he converted a try in a 35–15 win over Bramley on 13 October. He was the hero in the match with Hull which New Zealand won 15–13 before a crowd of 12,000. Hull had not been beaten for 35 consecutive matches on their home ground. During the second half Gregory kicked a penalty goal and then converted Hec Brisbane's try before converting Wilson Hall's last minute try to win the match for New Zealand. New Zealand had their fortunes reversed against Oldham on 23 October when they went down 10-15 although Gregory was said to have "often cleared well when hard pressed" before a crowd of 15,000.

Gregory was once again at fullback for the match against Leeds which New Zealand won 13–11 with him said to be "the safest fullback". St Helens Recreation proved too strong with a 28–14 win despite having four regular players absent. Gregory converted a try late in the match with the result a foregone conclusion. Gregory was then selected for the second test against England at Hull. New Zealand went down 11-21 before a relatively small crowd of 8,000 as poor results and internal strife in the New Zealand team had done little to inspire interest from the local supporters. Gregory kicked a second half penalty and said to have been "safe at fullback". During the match Gregory injured his hand which meant that he was unable to play for a period after the test. Gregory returned to fullback for a 14–16 loss to Swinton 2 weeks later on 27 November. A week later New Zealand played their third test of the tour with Gregory at fullback for their test match with Wales at Pontypridd. New Zealand were thrashed 34–8 in front of 10,000 spectators. On 4 December he was on the end of a 12–22 defeat by St Helens. Then he was unfortunate in the next match with Wigan 3 days later on 11 December. He twisted his knee in the second half and had to leave the field. New Zealand had only trailed 12–14 at the interval but with him and Kirwan having to leave the field New Zealand had to continue with 11 players and fell away to lose 15–36.

His knee injury was likely to have been serious because he took no part in the final 9 matches of the tour. Therefore, he finished having played in 15 matches in total. After returning to New Zealand the Auckland-based members of the side then played in a New Zealand XIII against the local Auckland side and they went down 21–24 with Gregory in his usual position at fullback for the returnees.

=== Continuation of club career and local representative league ===
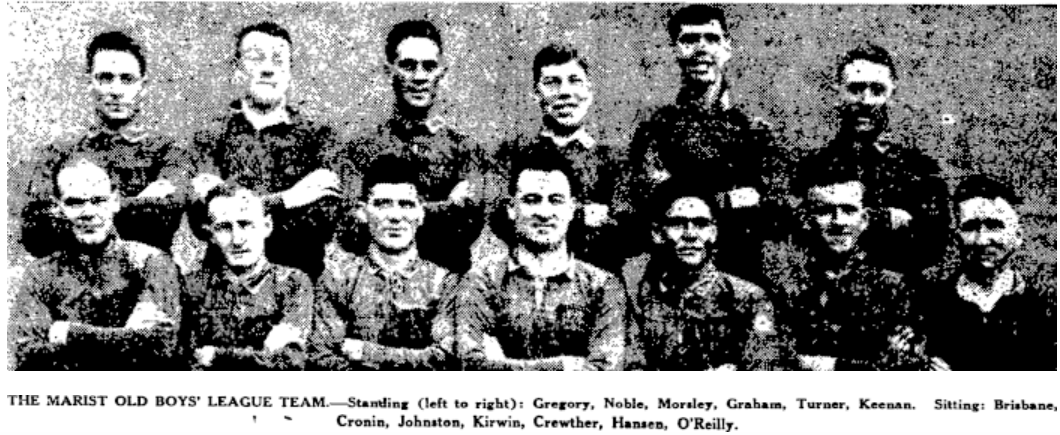

Gregory returned to the club fields of Auckland in 1927 and played 12 games for Marist before being selected in the Auckland team to play Canterbury on 10 September. Auckland had embarked on a rare tour and the match was played at Monica Park, in Christchurch. Auckland won 24–13 before 3,000 spectators. The local media were particularly impressed by his play saying that "Wetherill and Gregory had a trick up their sleeves in all sorts of positions, and worked the scissors and reverse passes very cleverly… Dufty was always ready to join in, and at a signal from Gregory… was up in a flash to take a scissors pass…", and that he is a "great footballer, who can take all sorts of passes at speed". He then was part of the Auckland side which defeated Otago at the Caledonian Ground in Dunedin 20-13 before a crowd of 2,000. He started in the centres but switched positions with Dufty at halftime. He played in the final tour match against Wellington at Newtown Park in Wellington with Auckland winning 41-23. A week later Gregory was selected to play in the North Island v South Island inter-island match for the first time. He played in the five eighths position and set up Auckland's second try in a 13–8 win. Gregory then finished the season playing in the same position in a match against Buller at Carlaw Park. Auckland romped to a 60–33 win with Gregory for the first time in his senior career scoring 3 tries in a match, and he also kicked a conversion.

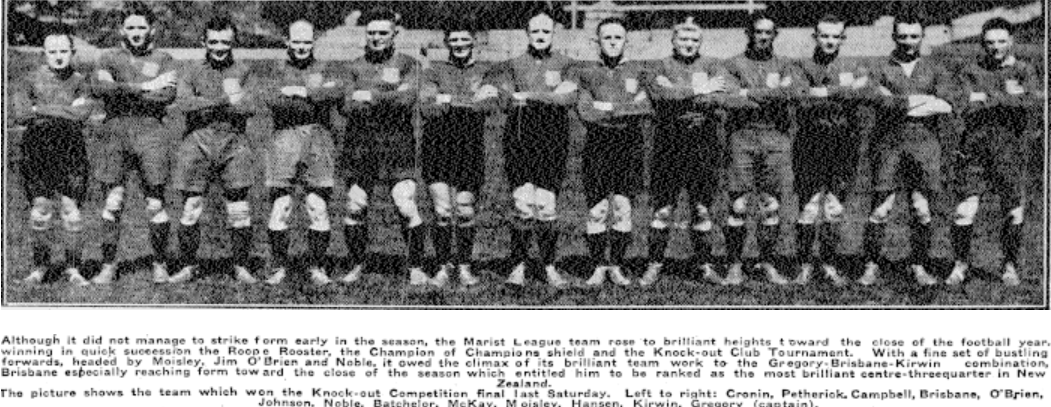

The 1928 season saw Gregory elected on to the management committee of the Marist Old Boys club as part of the executive committee. He only played one representative match during the season which was for the Auckland Possibles side against the Probables in July. It was part of a series of trial matches in preparation to pick the New Zealand team to play the touring England side. He kicked a conversion though his side lost 14–24 and ultimately he was not selected for the New Zealand side. He did however have a busy year for Marist, playing 16 games for them and kicking 21 goals, and was part of their Roope Rooster, Stormont Shield, and Labour Day tournament winning sides.

At the start of the 1929 season Gregory had announced his retirement though one week into the season he was back on the playing field. His club form was very good, and he was the second highest point scorer in the competition with 62 points behind Frank Delgrosso (108), while he scored 71 points for Marist across all 13 games he played for them.

On 17 August he played for Auckland against Northland with Auckland winning 22–19, then a week later he was in the side for their easy 47–18 win over Canterbury before 10,000 at Carlaw Park. He then gained selection for the North Island v South Island match. He kicked a conversion though was on the losing side with the South Island securing a 22–13 victory.

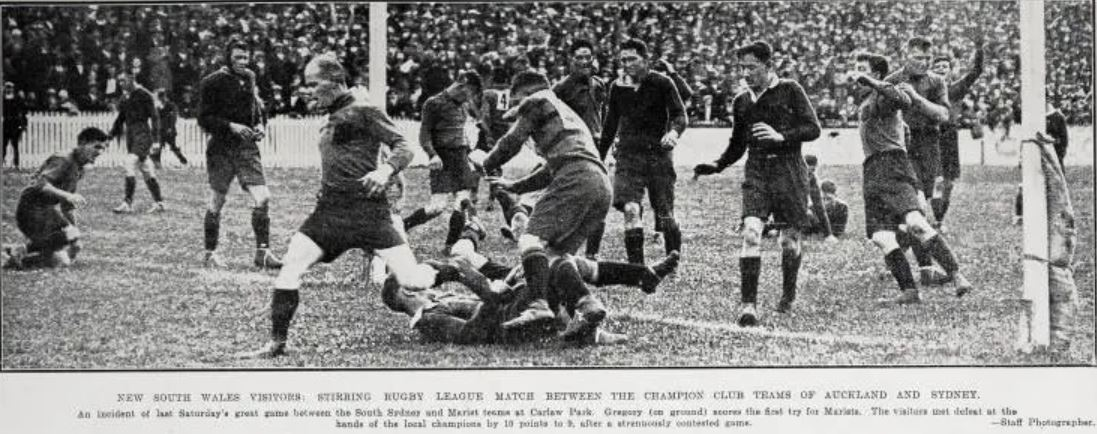
Gregory scoring one of his two tries for Marist against South Sydney.

At the end of the season in October Marist played against the South Sydney side who were the first ever Australian side to tour New Zealand. Marist defeated them 10–9 in front of an enormous crowd of 15,000 with Gregory scoring all of Marists points through 2 tries, a conversion and a penalty. A week later they met again in front of a similar sized crowd though this time they fell 5–21 with Gregory kicking a penalty.

=== New Zealand 1930 tour of Australia ===
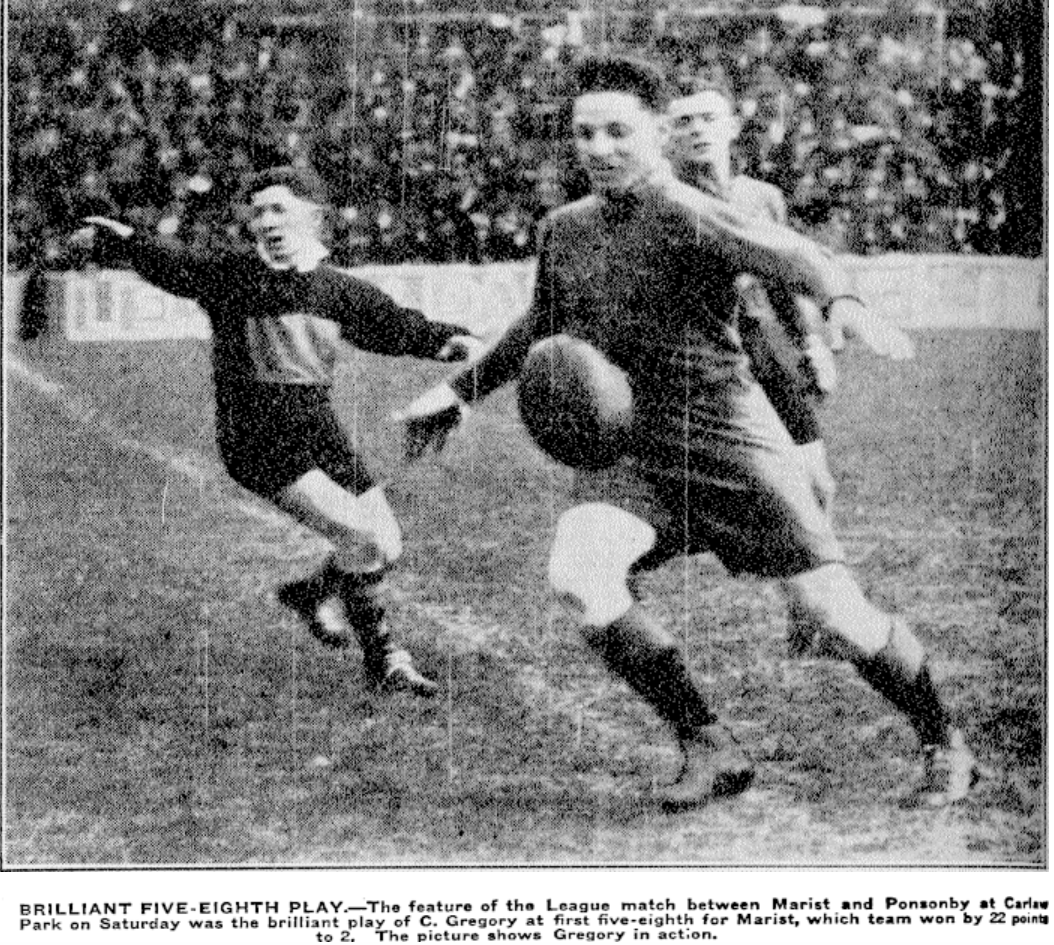

Such was Gregory's consistent form through 1929 and into 1930 that he gained selection for the New Zealand team to tour Australia and was named captain. He had played 5 matches for Marist, scoring 29 points. Then in the New Zealand Probables side in their trial match he scored a try and kicked 3 conversions in their 28–3 win over the Possibles.

Gregory played in 12 of the 13 matches. His first match was against New South Wales in Sydney with New Zealand going down 16–5. He played in the five eighths in 7 of the matches, with the other 5 at fullback. He kicked 3 conversions and a penalty in a 20–14 win against Western Division in the second match of the tour at Bathurst Bathurst Sports Ground. He was at fullback for New Zealand's heavy 29–2 loss to New South Wales before a crowd of 19,060 in Sydney. New Zealand lost three players to injury and eventually only had 10 players on the field. Gregory had a better time of it against New England at Armidale when they won 34–19 and he scored a try. Two losses followed for Gregory and New Zealand against Queensland in Brisbane by 14–11, and 32–6 respectively. They managed a win over Brisbane 19-17 again under the leadership of Gregory though he was at fullback for the match.

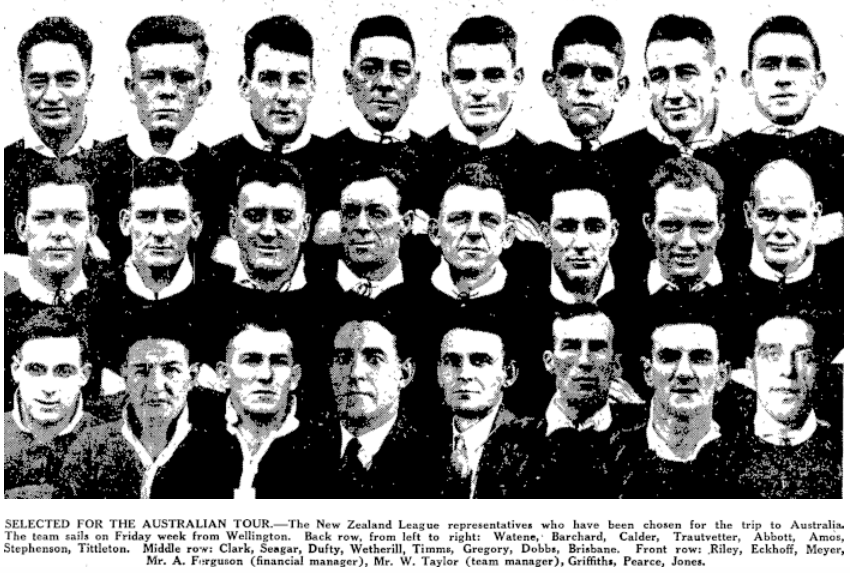

The side then travelled back down to Sydney where they played the Sydney Metropolis side and went down 39–22 before losing by a similar score of 34–22 to the same opponent 2 days later. Gregory was again leading from fullback against a Southern Division side at Young Showground in the town of Young, New South Wales with New Zealand winning 24–20. The final two matches of the tour continued this winning theme. Gregory had moved back to the five eighth position after spending a few matches at full back and New Zealand defeated Newcastle at the Newcastle Showgrounds 25–22. They then beat a Universities XIII side 18–12 with Gregory crossing the line for a try in what would prove to be his last ever performance for New Zealand against foreign opponents. Upon their return mention was made by the management of the side that injuries had played a huge part in their tour results with 16 of the 22 players injured with some of them serious. Gregory said "although we are disappointed with the result of the tour, it was casualties that beat us to a large extent. The hard grounds caused a terrible lot of accidents, ankle injuries alone being suffered by seven of the team". He was also critical of the selection of only one halfback meaning Abbott had to play in every single match.

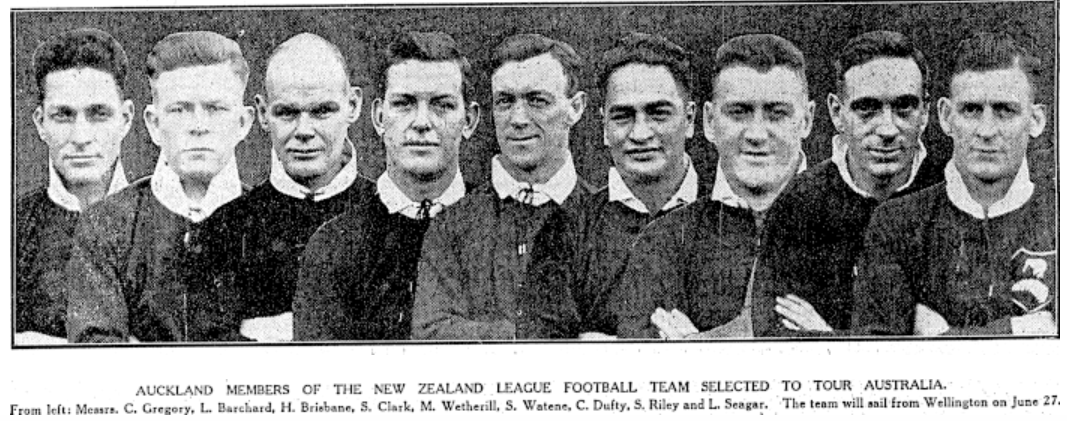

Like on previous tours the New Zealand side returned and played against Auckland at Carlaw Park. Gregory was at fullback for New Zealand's 34–27 win, ending his career on a positive note with 4 consecutive wins.

=== Retirement and coaching ===
The 1931 season was to be his last. He had semi retired and only returned to play a handful of matches for Marist to help them as required. He did however play well, and scored 21 points in 5 appearances. His final two matches were in the two end of season wins which secured Marist the Fox Memorial title which was being competed for, for the first time in its history. He ultimately finished with 86 appearances for Marist over his 8 seasons with them. In 1934 he became the coach of the Marist senior side when they finished last in the competition. He continued to coach them in 1935 when they improved and finished mid table. He was unable to continue coaching Marist in 1936 as he had moved to an "outer district" of Auckland and "found it inconvenient to retain a position he has held with credit". He did however appear to take on the Marist reserve grade side and then mid season he took over the responsibilities of the Ellerslie third grade side in a coaching role indicating he had moved to that area. They went on to win the championship for the grade. One of the players in this third grade side under his tutelage was Arthur McInnarney who became Kiwi number 276 at just 18 years of age in 1939. In 1938 he had transferred to Mt Albert and debuted in the first five position creating an immediate impression.

== Personal life and death ==
Charles Edward Gregory married Alma Mabel Bridgford (1905-1982) on 24 November 1930. Alma had been born in Auckland in 1905. He worked as a lineman in Auckland. On 12 January 1935 he was seriously injured in a fall from an Auckland Transport Board tower lorry. At the time he was repairing some overhead lines which had been damaged by a tram pole near the junction of Khyber Pass Road and Broadway in Newmarket when the line fell loose and knocked him off the platform. He fell 20 feet to the ground landing on the small of his back and suffered spinal injuries though he did not lose consciousness. He was said to be living at 7 Dorset Street in Westmere at the time.

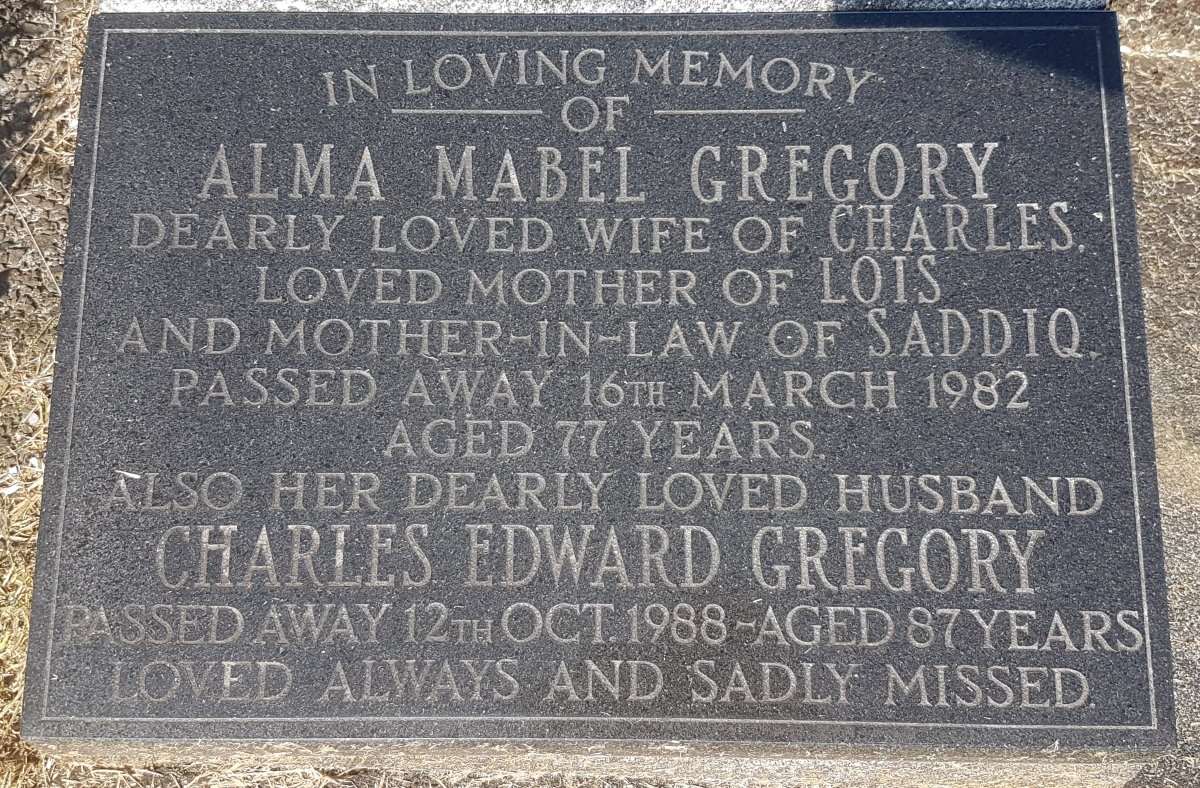
Charles and Alma's gravestone at Waikumete Cemetery in Glen Eden, Auckland.

Fortunately he recovered well considering the seriousness of the fall and this was mentioned at the annual meeting of the Marist club 2 and a half months later. He was able to continue with his coaching duties that season with Marist finishing mid table.

Alma died on 16 March 1982 aged 77, and Charles died on 12 October 1988, aged 87 in Auckland. They had a daughter named Lois which is noted on their grave stone at Waikumete Cemetery
