= William Devin =

William Devin may refer to:

- William A. Devin (1871–1959), American jurist
- William F. Devin (1898–1982), American politician, mayor of Seattle
- Bill Devin (1915–2000), American businessman, automotive entrepreneur and racing driver

== See also ==
- William Devine (disambiguation)
