= Ernest Mair =

Australian rugby league coach and administrator

Personal information
- Full name: Ernest Hartley Mair
- Born: 15 January 1891; Ipswich, Queensland, Australia
- Died: 12 January 1957 (aged 65); Brisbane, Australia

Coaching information
Representative
Years	Team	Gms	W	D	L	W%
1926–27	New Zealand	34 (4)	17	0	17 (4)

Ernest Hartley Mair (15 January 1891 – 12 January 1957) was an Australian rugby league administrator and hotelier, who coached the New Zealand side on their 1926-27 tour of Great Britain.

== Early years ==
Ernest Mair was born on 15 January 1891 to a Scottish father and English mother in Ipswich. He played rugby league as a youth, but was much more prominent as a swimmer, becoming President of the Toowoomba Swimming Association and also the Queensland Amateur Swimming Association.

In 1920, he married Mildred Readshaw and with her ran several hotels in Toowoomba.

After becoming President of the Valley club in Toowoomba and Toowoomba Junior Rugby League, Mair was appointed New Zealand Rugby League representative on the Australian Rugby League board of control.

== 1925-26 New Zealand Tour ==
New Zealand lost the series 0–3 against the Great Britain Lions and also lost a test match against Wales. The tour of Britain involved several skirmishes within the Kiwi party. Problems began on the boat journey over, with disputes developing about aspects of the trip and a rift developed between Mair and seven forwards. The disputes continued once the party arrived in Britain, with one of the rebels being involved in a street fight with another member of the tour party after the opening match. At a meeting with English Rugby League authorities in on 8 November, following further disturbances which almost led to the tour party being evicted from their Harrogate hotel, it was decided that Mair would withdraw from team selection and match tactics for a period of a month.

The tour, and the costly disputes, continued with the rebels eventually setting sail for home a week earlier than their colleagues. Three months later all seven players (Arthur Singe, Neil Mouat, John Herbert James Wright, Alphonsus Carroll, Bill Devine, Lou Petersen and Frank Henry) were banned for life by the New Zealand Rugby League.

== Later life ==
Mair returned to Toowoomba in March 1927, becoming one of the district team selectors and was made a life member of the Toowoomba Rugby League in November 1927.

In September 1929, Mair was charged with attempting to convince two men to set fire to a hotel he owned, the Commercial Hotel in Cunnamulla. Mair was discharged after the case against him collapsed. In 1938, Ernest Mair was in Cairns, Queensland and the team manager of Past Brothers Minor Juniors who won the 1938 Premiership in the local C.R.L (Cairns Rugby League). He died in Brisbane, on 12 January 1957, aged 65, after injuries sustained after being struck by a car in Brisbane.
