= Lui Paewai =

NZ Maori international rugby union player

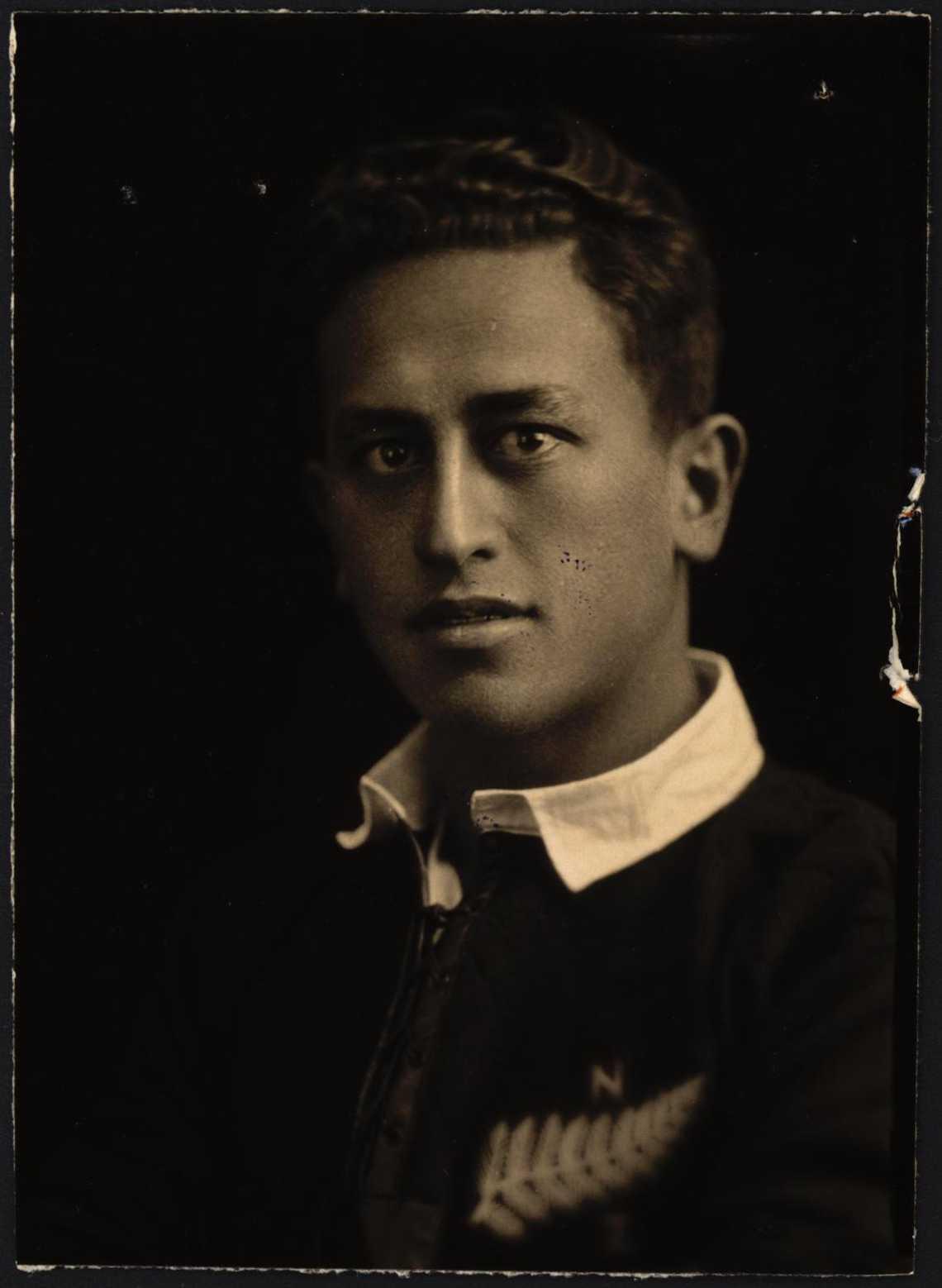
- Born: Lui Paewai; 10 August 1906 Dannevirke, New Zealand
- Died: 2 January 1970 (aged 63) Dannevirke, New Zealand
- Height: 1.74 m (5 ft 9 in)
- Weight: 73 kg (161 lb)
- School: Māori Agricultural College

Rugby union career
- Position(s): First five-eighth Second five-eighth Full-back
Provincial / State sides
Years	Team	Apps	(Points)
1922–26	Hawke's Bay	24	
1927–28	Auckland	13	
International career
Years	Team	Apps	(Points)
1923–24	New Zealand	0	(0)
1923–28	New Zealand Māori		

Lui Paewai (10 August 1906 – 2 January 1970) was a New Zealand rugby union player. A five-eighth and full-back, Paewai represented Hawke's Bay and Auckland at a provincial level, and was a member of the New Zealand national side, the All Blacks, in 1923 and 1924. He played eight matches for the All Blacks but did not play any internationals. He is generally regarded as being the youngest ever All Black, making his debut at the age of 17 years 36 days.

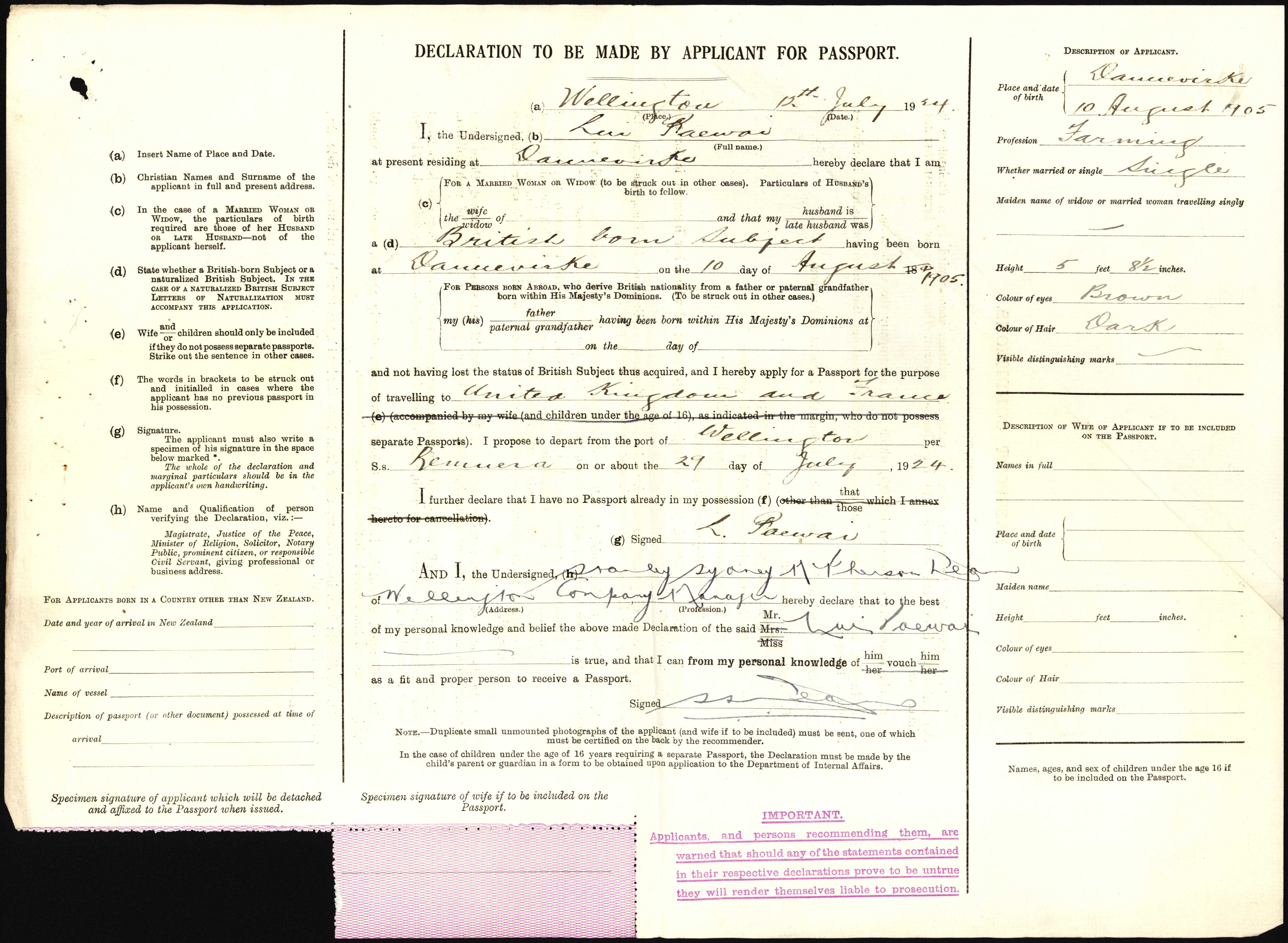
Lui Paewai passport application (1924)
