= Bill Devine =

New Zealand rugby player (1893-1956)

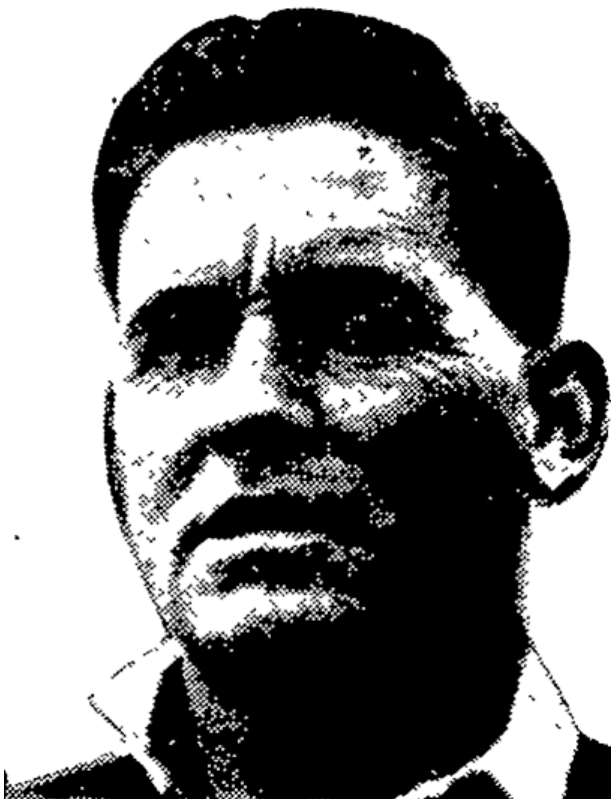

Personal information
- Full name: William Walter Devine
- Born: c. 1893 New Zealand
- Died: 28 December 1956 (aged 63)

Playing information

Rugby union
Club
Years	Team	Pld	T	G	FG	P
	Marist Old Boys

Rugby league
- Position: Second-row
Club
Years	Team	Pld	T	G	FG	P
1924–26	Marist Old Boys
Representative
Years	Team	Pld	T	G	FG	P
1924	Canterbury
1924–27	New Zealand	3	0	0	0	0
1925–26	South Canterbury

William Walter Devine (c. 1893 – 28 December 1956) was a New Zealand rugby union and professional rugby league footballer who played representative rugby league (RL) for New Zealand.

== Playing career ==
Devine originally played rugby union for the Marist Old Boys club in Canterbury. However, Marist Old Boys were expelled from the Canterbury Rugby Union in April 1924 after they forfeited a Payne Cup fixture in 1923 due to a row over the eligibility of three players. They instead joined the Canterbury Rugby League and Devine followed, converting to rugby league.

In his first season, he was one of six Marist players who were selected for New Zealand.

He left the club in 1925, playing for South Canterbury against Canterbury B. He was then selected on the controversial 1926–1927 New Zealand tour of Great Britain. The tour involved several skirmishes within the Kiwi party. Problems began on the boat journey over, with disputes developing about aspects of the trip and a rift developed between tour manager and coach, Australian Ernest Mair, and seven forwards, including Devine. The disputes continued once the party arrived in Britain. In mid-November, following further disturbances which almost led to the tour party being evicted from their Harrogate hotel, it was decided that coach Mair would withdraw from team selection and match tactics for a period of four weeks. The tour, and the costly disputes, continued with the rebels eventually setting sail for home a week earlier than their colleagues.

Three months later all seven players were banned for life by the New Zealand Rugby League, ending Devine's rugby career.

== Death ==
William Devine died on 28 December 1956. He was a constable at the time and in charge of the Islington Police Station since 1951. His obituary described how he had joined the police force in 1923 and had been posted to the Christchurch Central Police Station. He was stationed at Timaru, Christchurch and St Albans in later years and spent some time in charge of the police station at Green Island near Dunedin. He had been a "first-grade distance swimmer" and represented Manawatu at rugby before he had been transferred to Wellington where he played for Marist Old Boys. When he was transferred to Christchurch in 1823 he joined the Marist league club. He was survived by his wife and four sons, William, Leo, Colin, and Brian.
