= College Rifles RFC =

New Zealand rugby union club

Coordinates: 36.883078524°S 174.81378393°E

(New Zealand) College Rifles Rugby Union Football & Sports Club
- Union: Auckland Rugby Football Union
- Founded: 1897
- Location: Remuera
- Region: Auckland
- Ground: College Rifles Park
- President: Peter Kempson
- League: Auckland Premier
Team kit

Official website
- www.collegerifles.co.nz

College Rifles Rugby Union Football & Sports Club are a rugby union club based in Auckland, New Zealand. The club was established in 1897 by members of the Volunteer Corps, and today accepts male and female players at senior and junior levels. The club is affiliated with the Auckland Rugby Football Union.

In addition to the club's primary sport of rugby union, College Rifles is active in badminton, football 7's, netball, lacrosse, tennis and touch rugby.

== All Blacks ==
College Rifles has produced five All Blacks, the most recent being Jon McLachlan, who played a single test match in 1974.

- Lyn Weston
- Viv Wilson
- Charlie Fletcher
- Reg Sheen
- Jon McLachlan

== Honours ==
College Rifles have won the Auckland men's premier competition on two occasions, in 1919 and 1964.
